= Rough ride =

Rough ride may refer to:

- Rough Ride (book), a 1990 bicycling autobiography
- Rough ride (police brutality), in which a prisoner is restrained, put into a police vehicle, and then thrown about as the vehicle is driven erratically
- The Rough Ride, a Hong Kong television series which premiered in 1985
- "Rough Ride" (Ballers), a 2018 television episode
- Rough Ride, a song on the 1989 Paul McCartney album Flowers in the Dirt

== See also ==
- Rough Rider (film)
- Rough Riders (disambiguation)
