= 2008 1000 km of Spa =

The Circuit de Spa-Francorchamps

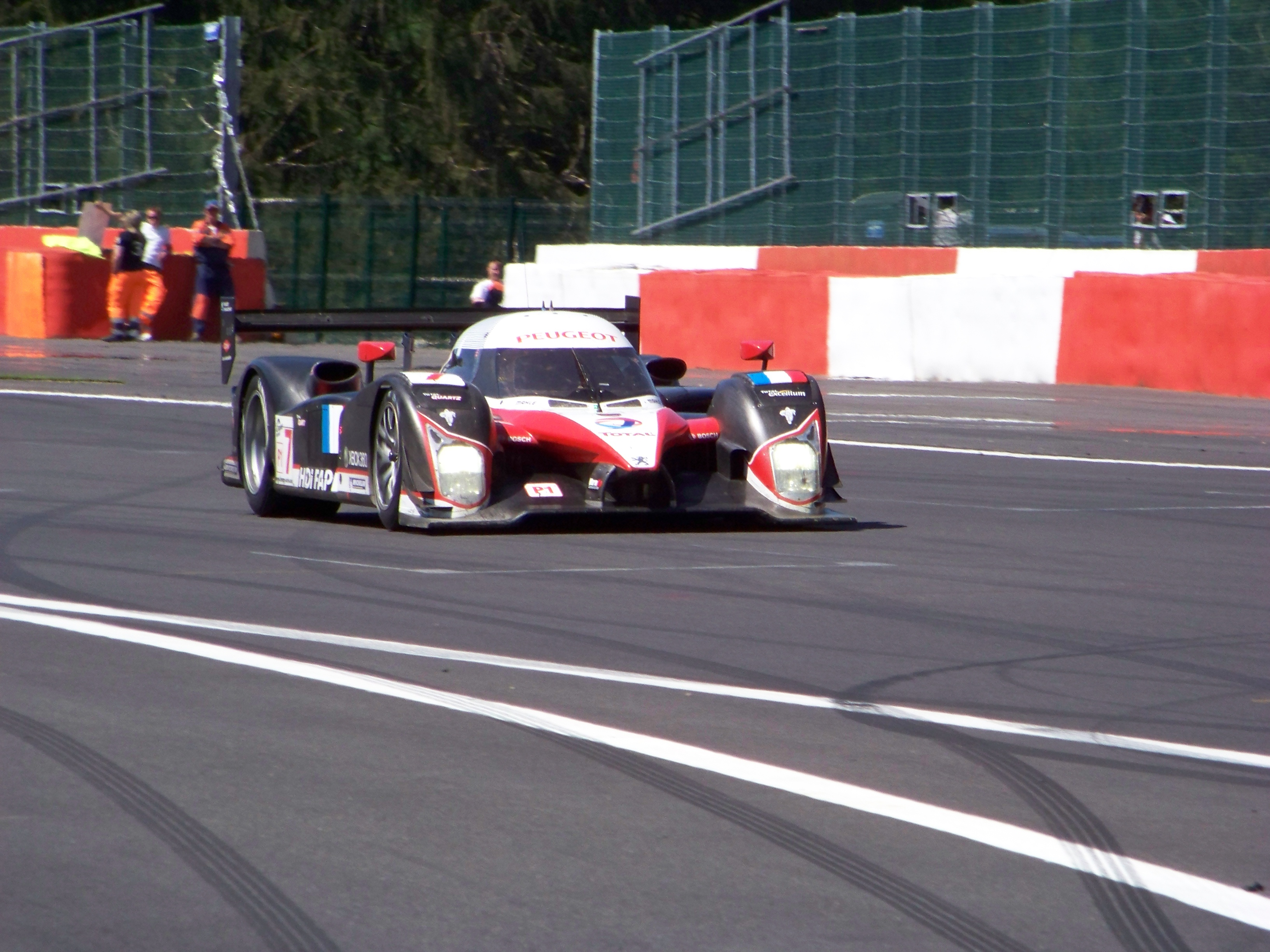
The winning Peugeot 908 HDi FAP of Nicolas Minassian, Marc Gené, and Jacques Villeneuve.

The 2008 1000 km of Spa was the third round of the 2008 Le Mans Series season. It took place at the Circuit de Spa-Francorchamps, Belgium, on 11 May 2008.

This race marked the first international victory for Canadian Jacques Villeneuve since the Formula One Luxembourg Grand Prix in 1997.

== Race results ==
Class winners in bold. Cars failing to complete 70% of their Class winner's distance marked as Not Classified (NC).

Pos	Class	No	Team	Drivers	Chassis	Tyre	Laps
Pos	Class	No	Team	Drivers	Engine	Tyre	Laps
1	**LMP1**	**7**	**(France) Team Peugeot Total**	**(France) Nicolas Minassian (Spain) Marc Gené (Canada) Jacques Villeneuve**	**Peugeot 908 HDi FAP**	MI	**143**
1	**LMP1**	**7**	**(France) Team Peugeot Total**	**(France) Nicolas Minassian (Spain) Marc Gené (Canada) Jacques Villeneuve**	**Peugeot HDi 5.5 L Turbo V12 (Diesel)**	MI	**143**
2	LMP1	2	(Germany) Audi Sport Team Joest	(France) Alexandre Prémat (Germany) Mike Rockenfeller	Audi R10	MI	143
2	LMP1	2	(Germany) Audi Sport Team Joest	(France) Alexandre Prémat (Germany) Mike Rockenfeller	Audi TDI 5.5 L Turbo V12 (Diesel)	MI	143
3	LMP1	6	(France) Team Oreca-Matmut	(France) Olivier Panis (France) Nicolas Lapierre	Courage-Oreca LC70	MI	140
3	LMP1	6	(France) Team Oreca-Matmut	(France) Olivier Panis (France) Nicolas Lapierre	Judd GV5.5 S2 5.5 L V10	MI	140
4	LMP1	1	(Germany) Audi Sport Team Joest	(United Kingdom) Allan McNish (Italy) Rinaldo Capello	Audi R10	MI	139
4	LMP1	1	(Germany) Audi Sport Team Joest	(United Kingdom) Allan McNish (Italy) Rinaldo Capello	Audi TDI 5.5 L Turbo V12 (Diesel)	MI	139
5	LMP1	16	(France) Pescarolo Sport	(France) Emmanuel Collard (France) Jean-Christophe Boullion	Pescarolo 01	MI	139
5	LMP1	16	(France) Pescarolo Sport	(France) Emmanuel Collard (France) Jean-Christophe Boullion	Judd GV5.5 S2 5.5 L V10	MI	139
6	**LMP2**	**34**	**(Netherlands) Van Merksteijn Motorsport**	**(Netherlands) Peter Van Merksteijn (Netherlands) Jos Verstappen**	**Porsche RS Spyder Evo**	MI	**138**
6	**LMP2**	**34**	**(Netherlands) Van Merksteijn Motorsport**	**(Netherlands) Peter Van Merksteijn (Netherlands) Jos Verstappen**	**Porsche MR6 3.4 L V8**	MI	**138**
7	LMP2	27	(Switzerland) Horag Racing	(Switzerland) Fredy Lienhard (Belgium) Didier Theys (Netherlands) Jan Lammers	Porsche RS Spyder Evo	MI	138
7	LMP2	27	(Switzerland) Horag Racing	(Switzerland) Fredy Lienhard (Belgium) Didier Theys (Netherlands) Jan Lammers	Porsche MR6 3.4 L V8	MI	138
8	LMP2	31	(Denmark) Team Essex	(Denmark) Casper Elgaard (Denmark) John Nielsen	Porsche RS Spyder Evo	D	135
8	LMP2	31	(Denmark) Team Essex	(Denmark) Casper Elgaard (Denmark) John Nielsen	Porsche MR6 3.4 L V8	D	135
9	LMP1	15	(United Kingdom) Creation AIM	(United Kingdom) Stuart Hall (United Kingdom) Robbie Kerr	Creation CA07	D	134
9	LMP1	15	(United Kingdom) Creation AIM	(United Kingdom) Stuart Hall (United Kingdom) Robbie Kerr	AIM (Judd) YS5.5 5.5 L V10	D	134
10	LMP2	35	(France) Saulnier Racing	(France) Pierre Ragues (France) Matthieu Lahaye	Pescarolo 01	MI	134
10	LMP2	35	(France) Saulnier Racing	(France) Pierre Ragues (France) Matthieu Lahaye	Judd DB 3.4 L V8	MI	134
11	LMP1	20	(Spain) Epsilon Euskadi	(Spain) Ángel Burgueño (Spain) Miguel Ángel de Castro	Epsilon Euskadi ee1	MI	133
11	LMP1	20	(Spain) Epsilon Euskadi	(Spain) Ángel Burgueño (Spain) Miguel Ángel de Castro	Judd GV5.5 S2 5.5 L V10	MI	133
12	LMP2	41	(Switzerland) Trading Performance	(Saudi Arabia) Karim Ojjeh (France) Claude-Yves Gosselin (Belgium) Julian Schroyen	Zytek 07S/2	MI	133
12	LMP2	41	(Switzerland) Trading Performance	(Saudi Arabia) Karim Ojjeh (France) Claude-Yves Gosselin (Belgium) Julian Schroyen	Zytek ZG348 3.4 L V8	MI	133
13	**GT1**	**72**	**(France) Luc Alphand Aventures**	**(France) Luc Alphand (France) Guillaume Moreau (France) Patrice Goueslard**	**Chevrolet Corvette C6.R**	MI	**130**
13	**GT1**	**72**	**(France) Luc Alphand Aventures**	**(France) Luc Alphand (France) Guillaume Moreau (France) Patrice Goueslard**	**Chevrolet LS7-R 7.0 L V8**	MI	**130**
14	LMP1	4	(France) Saulnier Racing	(France) Jacques Nicolet (Monaco) Marc Faggionato (Monaco) Richard Hein	Pescarolo 01	MI	130
14	LMP1	4	(France) Saulnier Racing	(France) Jacques Nicolet (Monaco) Marc Faggionato (Monaco) Richard Hein	Judd GV5.5 S2 5.5 L V10	MI	130
15	GT1	55	(Russia) IPB Spartak Racing (Germany) Reiter Engineering	(Netherlands) Peter Kox (Russia) Roman Rusinov	Lamborghini Murciélago R-GT	MI	129
15	GT1	55	(Russia) IPB Spartak Racing (Germany) Reiter Engineering	(Netherlands) Peter Kox (Russia) Roman Rusinov	Lamborghini L535 6.0 L V12	MI	129
16	GT1	59	(United Kingdom) Team Modena	(Czech Republic) Tomáš Enge (Spain) Antonio García	Aston Martin DBR9	MI	127
16	GT1	59	(United Kingdom) Team Modena	(Czech Republic) Tomáš Enge (Spain) Antonio García	Aston Martin 6.0 L V12	MI	127
17	**GT2**	**96**	**(United Kingdom) Virgo Motorsport**	**(United Kingdom) Rob Bell (Italy) Gianmaria Bruni**	**Ferrari F430GT**	D	**126**
17	**GT2**	**96**	**(United Kingdom) Virgo Motorsport**	**(United Kingdom) Rob Bell (Italy) Gianmaria Bruni**	**Ferrari 4.0 L V8**	D	**126**
18	GT2	77	(Germany) Team Felbermayr-Proton	(Germany) Marc Lieb (Australia) Alex Davison	Porsche 997 GT3-RSR	MI	126
18	GT2	77	(Germany) Team Felbermayr-Proton	(Germany) Marc Lieb (Australia) Alex Davison	Porsche 3.8 L Flat-6	MI	126
19	GT2	88	(Germany) Team Felbermayr-Proton	(Austria) Horst Felbermayr, Sr. (Austria) Horst Felbermayr, Jr. (Germany) Christian Ried	Porsche 997 GT3-RSR	MI	123
19	GT2	88	(Germany) Team Felbermayr-Proton	(Austria) Horst Felbermayr, Sr. (Austria) Horst Felbermayr, Jr. (Germany) Christian Ried	Porsche 3.8 L Flat-6	MI	123
20	GT2	94	(Switzerland) Speedy Racing Team	(Switzerland) Andrea Chiesa (Switzerland) Benjamin Leuenberger (Switzerland) Iradj Alexander	Spyker C8 Laviolette GT2-R	MI	123
20	GT2	94	(Switzerland) Speedy Racing Team	(Switzerland) Andrea Chiesa (Switzerland) Benjamin Leuenberger (Switzerland) Iradj Alexander	Audi 4.0 L V8	MI	123
21	GT2	99	(Monaco) JMB Racing (United Kingdom) Aucott Racing	(France) Alain Ferté (United Kingdom) Ben Aucott	Ferrari F430GT	MI	123
21	GT2	99	(Monaco) JMB Racing (United Kingdom) Aucott Racing	(France) Alain Ferté (United Kingdom) Ben Aucott	Ferrari 4.0 L V8	MI	123
22	GT2	76	(France) IMSA Performance Matmut	(France) Raymond Narac (Austria) Richard Lietz	Porsche 997 GT3-RSR	MI	122
22	GT2	76	(France) IMSA Performance Matmut	(France) Raymond Narac (Austria) Richard Lietz	Porsche 3.8 L Flat-6	MI	122
23	GT2	98	(Monaco) JMB Racing	(Switzerland) Maurice Basso (Netherlands) Peter Kutemann (France) Stéphane Daoudi	Ferrari F430GT	MI	122
23	GT2	98	(Monaco) JMB Racing	(Switzerland) Maurice Basso (Netherlands) Peter Kutemann (France) Stéphane Daoudi	Ferrari 4.0 L V8	MI	122
24	GT1	61	(United Kingdom) Strakka Racing	(United Kingdom) Peter Hardman (United Kingdom) Nick Leventis	Aston Martin DBR9	D	121
24	GT1	61	(United Kingdom) Strakka Racing	(United Kingdom) Peter Hardman (United Kingdom) Nick Leventis	Aston Martin 6.0 L V12	D	121
25	GT2	95	(United Kingdom) James Watt Automotive	(Finland) Markus Palttala (United Kingdom) Paul Daniels (United Kingdom) Tim Sugden	Porsche 997 GT3-RSR	D	121
25	GT2	95	(United Kingdom) James Watt Automotive	(Finland) Markus Palttala (United Kingdom) Paul Daniels (United Kingdom) Tim Sugden	Porsche 3.8 L Flat-6	D	121
26	GT2	85	(Netherlands) Snoras Spyker Squadron	(United Kingdom) Peter Dumbreck (Germany) Ralf Kelleners (Russia) Alexey Vasilyev	Spyker C8 Laviolette GT2-R	MI	118
26	GT2	85	(Netherlands) Snoras Spyker Squadron	(United Kingdom) Peter Dumbreck (Germany) Ralf Kelleners (Russia) Alexey Vasilyev	Audi 4.0 L V8	MI	118
27	LMP1	18	(United Kingdom) Rollcentre Racing	(Finland) Mikael Forsten (Portugal) João Barbosa (Belgium) Vanina Ickx	Pescarolo 01	D	112
27	LMP1	18	(United Kingdom) Rollcentre Racing	(Finland) Mikael Forsten (Portugal) João Barbosa (Belgium) Vanina Ickx	Judd GV5.5 S2 5.5 L V10	D	112
28	LMP2	25	(United Kingdom) Ray Mallock Ltd.	(United Kingdom) Mike Newton (Brazil) Thomas Erdos	MG-Lola EX265	MI	111
28	LMP2	25	(United Kingdom) Ray Mallock Ltd.	(United Kingdom) Mike Newton (Brazil) Thomas Erdos	MG (AER) XP21 2.0 L Turbo I4	MI	111
29	LMP1	10	(Czech Republic) Charouz Racing System	(Czech Republic) Jan Charouz (Germany) Stefan Mücke	Lola B08/60	MI	107
29	LMP1	10	(Czech Republic) Charouz Racing System	(Czech Republic) Jan Charouz (Germany) Stefan Mücke	Aston Martin 6.0 L V12	MI	107
30	LMP2	26	(United Kingdom) Team Bruichladdich Radical	(Germany) Jens Petersen (Germany) Jan-Dirk Lueders (France) Marc Rostan	Radical SR9	D	106
30	LMP2	26	(United Kingdom) Team Bruichladdich Radical	(Germany) Jens Petersen (Germany) Jan-Dirk Lueders (France) Marc Rostan	AER P07 2.0 L Turbo I4	D	106
31 NC^{†}	LMP1	17	(France) Pescarolo Sport	(Switzerland) Harold Primat (France) Christophe Tinseau	Pescarolo 01	MI	137
31 NC^{†}	LMP1	17	(France) Pescarolo Sport	(Switzerland) Harold Primat (France) Christophe Tinseau	Judd GV5.5 S2 5.5 L V10	MI	137
32 NC^{†}	LMP2	33	(Switzerland) Speedy Racing Team (United Kingdom) Sebah Automotive	(Italy) Andrea Belicchi (France) Xavier Pompidou (Switzerland) Steve Zacchia	Lola B08/80	MI	128
32 NC^{†}	LMP2	33	(Switzerland) Speedy Racing Team (United Kingdom) Sebah Automotive	(Italy) Andrea Belicchi (France) Xavier Pompidou (Switzerland) Steve Zacchia	Judd DB 3.4 L V8	MI	128
33 DNF	GT2	91	(Germany) Farnbacher Racing	(Denmark) Lars-Erik Nielsen (Denmark) Allan Simonsen (United Kingdom) Richard Westbrook	Porsche 997 GT3-RSR	MI	95
33 DNF	GT2	91	(Germany) Farnbacher Racing	(Denmark) Lars-Erik Nielsen (Denmark) Allan Simonsen (United Kingdom) Richard Westbrook	Porsche 3.8 L Flat-6	MI	95
34 DNF	GT2	90	(Germany) Farnbacher Racing	(Germany) Pierre Ehret (Germany) Pierre Kaffer	Ferrari F430GT	MI	93
34 DNF	GT2	90	(Germany) Farnbacher Racing	(Germany) Pierre Ehret (Germany) Pierre Kaffer	Ferrari 4.0 L V8	MI	93
35 DNF	LMP2	45	(United Kingdom) Embassy Racing	(United Kingdom) Jonny Kane (United Kingdom) Warren Hughes	Embassy WF01	MI	77
35 DNF	LMP2	45	(United Kingdom) Embassy Racing	(United Kingdom) Jonny Kane (United Kingdom) Warren Hughes	Zytek ZG348 3.4 L V8	MI	77
36 DNF	LMP1	3	(Monaco) Scuderia Lavaggi	(Monaco) Giovanni Lavaggi (Germany) Wolfgang Kaufmann	Lavaggi LS1	D	66
36 DNF	LMP1	3	(Monaco) Scuderia Lavaggi	(Monaco) Giovanni Lavaggi (Germany) Wolfgang Kaufmann	AER P32C 4.0 L Turbo V8	D	66
37 DNF	LMP2	32	(France) Barazi-Epsilon	(Denmark) Juan Barazi (Netherlands) Michael Vergers (Brazil) Fernando Rees	Zytek 07S/2	MI	62
37 DNF	LMP2	32	(France) Barazi-Epsilon	(Denmark) Juan Barazi (Netherlands) Michael Vergers (Brazil) Fernando Rees	Zytek ZG348 3.4 L V8	MI	62
38 DNF	LMP1	8	(France) Team Peugeot Total	(France) Stéphane Sarrazin (Portugal) Pedro Lamy (Austria) Alexander Wurz	Peugeot 908 HDi FAP	MI	56
38 DNF	LMP1	8	(France) Team Peugeot Total	(France) Stéphane Sarrazin (Portugal) Pedro Lamy (Austria) Alexander Wurz	Peugeot HDi 5.5 L Turbo V12 (Diesel)	MI	56
39 DNF	GT2	75	(France) IMSA Performance Matmut	(France) Richard Balandras (France) Michel Lecourt	Porsche 997 GT3-RSR	MI	49
39 DNF	GT2	75	(France) IMSA Performance Matmut	(France) Richard Balandras (France) Michel Lecourt	Porsche 3.8 L Flat-6	MI	49
40 DNF	LMP2	40	(Portugal) Quifel ASM Team	(Portugal) Miguel Amaral (France) Olivier Pla	Lola B05/40	D	35
40 DNF	LMP2	40	(Portugal) Quifel ASM Team	(Portugal) Miguel Amaral (France) Olivier Pla	AER P07 2.0 L Turbo I4	D	35
41 DNF	GT1	73	(France) Luc Alphand Aventures	(France) Sébastien Dumez (France) Jean-Luc Blanchemain (France) Stéphane Lémeret	Chevrolet Corvette C6.R	MI	26
41 DNF	GT1	73	(France) Luc Alphand Aventures	(France) Sébastien Dumez (France) Jean-Luc Blanchemain (France) Stéphane Lémeret	Chevrolet LS7-R 7.0 L V8	MI	26
42 DNF	LMP2	46	(United Kingdom) Embassy Racing	(United Kingdom) Tom Kimber-Smith (United Kingdom) Joey Foster	Embassy WF01	MI	0
42 DNF	LMP2	46	(United Kingdom) Embassy Racing	(United Kingdom) Tom Kimber-Smith (United Kingdom) Joey Foster	Zytek ZG348 3.4 L V8	MI	0
DNS	LMP2	44	(Germany) Kruse Schiller Motorsport	(France) Jean de Pourtalès (Japan) Hideki Noda	Lola B05/40	D	-
DNS	LMP2	44	(Germany) Kruse Schiller Motorsport	(France) Jean de Pourtalès (Japan) Hideki Noda	Mazda MZR-R 2.0 L Turbo I4	D	-
DNQ	LMP2	37	(France) WR Salini	(France) Stéphane Salini (France) Philippe Salini (France) Patrice Roussel	WR LMP2008	D	-
DNQ	LMP2	37	(France) WR Salini	(France) Stéphane Salini (France) Philippe Salini (France) Patrice Roussel	Zytek ZG348 3.4 L V8	D	-

Both the #17 Pescarolo and #33 Speedy Sebah entries failed to complete the final lap of the race. Both cars were therefore not classified in the final results even though they had covered sufficient distance.

== Statistics ==
- Pole Position – #8 Team Peugeot Total – 1:58.069
- Fastest Lap – #7 Team Peugeot Total – 1:59.883
- Average Speed – 189.062 km/h

Le Mans Series
Previous race: 2008 1000km of Monza	2008 season	Next race: 2008 1000km of Nürburgring
