= Rough Riders (disambiguation) =

The Rough Riders were the 1st US Volunteer Cavalry Regiment during the Spanish–American War.

Rough riders, roughriders, rough rider or roughrider may also refer to:

== Military and police ==
- City of London Yeomanry (Rough Riders), a defunct British Army regiment
- 4th New Zealand Contingent during the Second Boer War
- Rough rider (rank), a now defunct rank and appointment in the British Army, still used in the Royal Canadian Mounted Police
- The Rough Riders, a corps of expert horsemen established by the Canadian North-West Mounted Police in 1873

== Sports ==
- A participant in a rodeo, especially:
  - any Australian rodeo
  - the Angola Prison Rodeo in Louisiana
  - a bullrider
- Saskatchewan Roughriders, a Canadian Football League team
- Ottawa Rough Riders, a former Canadian Football League team
- Frisco RoughRiders, a minor league baseball team in Texas
- Cedar Rapids RoughRiders, a junior ice hockey team in the United States Hockey League
- Long Island Rough Riders, an American soccer team in the USL Premier Development League
- Peoria Pirates, known as the Peoria Rough Riders while in the United Indoor Football league
- Catasauqua High School Rough Riders, Catasauqua, Pennsylvania
- Roosevelt High School (Seattle, Washington) Roughriders
- Port Angeles High School (Port Angeles, Washington) Roughriders
- Center High School (Texas), Center, Texas, Roughriders
- West Virginia Roughriders, an American indoor football team in the American Arena League

== Arts and entertainment ==
- Rough Riders (rollercoaster), a themed rollercoaster that operated in New York's Coney Island from 1907 to 1914
- The Rough Riders (film), a 1927 fictional film set during the Spanish–American War
- Rough Riders a 1940s Western film series starring Buck Jones
- "Rough Riders", a 1943 march by Karl King
- The Rough Riders (TV series), a 1950s U.S. series set in the American West
- Rough Riders (miniseries), a 1997 miniseries about the Spanish–American War
- Rough Rider (film), a 2014 documentary
- "Rough Rider", a song by Prince Buster
- Rough Riders comic book, published by Aftershock, written by Adam Glass
- Rough Riders (album), an album by Lakeside
- Rough Rider (album), an album by David Allan Coe

== Other uses ==
- Rough Rider Award, presented to prominent North Dakotans by the governor of the state
- A series of toy cars made by Matchbox
- Tamiya Rough Rider, a 1979 1:10 radio-controlled off-road buggy by Tamiya

== See also ==
- Ruff Rider, an album by Tanya Stephens
- "Ruff Ryders' Anthem", a song by DMX
- Ruff Ryders Entertainment, a hip hop record label
- Rough ride (disambiguation)
