= Embassy WF01 =

British sports car prototype

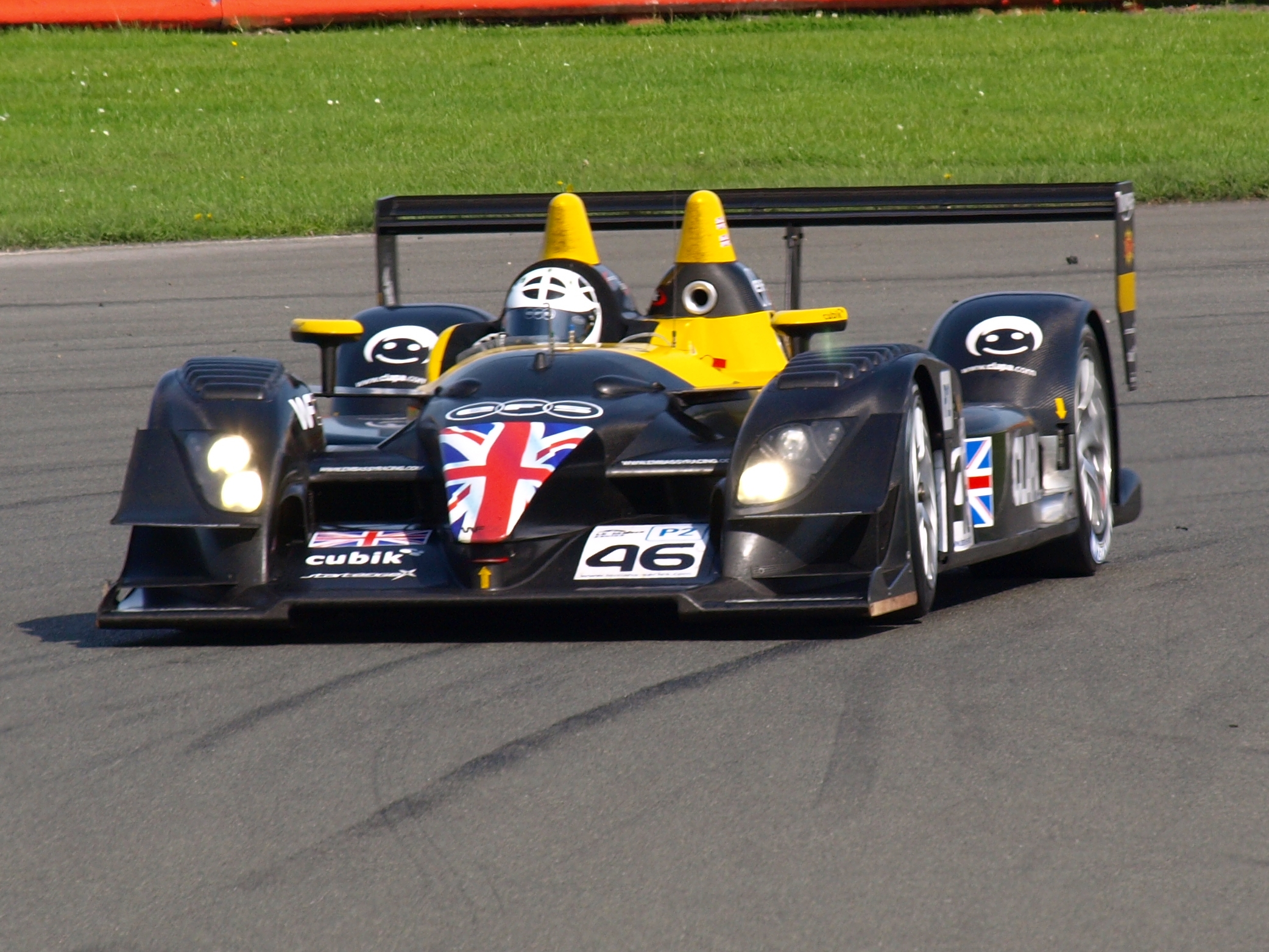
- Category: Le Mans Prototype
- Constructor: Embassy Racing
- Designer(s): Peter Elleray

Technical specifications
- Chassis: Carbon fiber monocoque
- Suspension (front): Double wishbones, pushrods coil springs and dampers with power steering.
- Suspension (rear): Same as front
- Engine: Zytek ZG348 3,396 cc (3.4 L; 207.2 cu in) 90° V8 NA, 32-valve, DOHC mid-engine, longitudinally-mounted
- Transmission: Ricardo 6-speed sequential
- Power: 540 hp (547 PS; 403 kW)
- Weight: 825 kg (1,819 lb)
- Brakes: Carbon ceramic ventilated discs, all-round

Competition history
- Notable entrants: (United Kingdom) Embassy Racing
- Notable drivers: (United Kingdom) Warren Hughes (United Kingdom) Jonny Kane (United Kingdom) Joey Foster (United Kingdom) Darren Manning (Brazil) Mário Haberfeld (United Kingdom) Tom Kimber-Smith (United Kingdom) Jody Firth
- Debut: 2008 1000 km of Catalunya
- Last event: 2009 1000 km of Silverstone
| Races | Wins | Podiums | Poles | F/Laps |
|---|---|---|---|---|
| 7 | 0 | 0 | 0 | 0 |
- Teams' Championships: 0
- Constructors' Championships: 0
- Drivers' Championships: 0

The Embassy WF01 is an Le Mans Prototype LMP2 race car designed, developed and built by British team, Embassy Racing, for the Le Mans Endurance Series and the 24 Hours of Le Mans. The car was powered by the Zytek ZG348 with a total of two cars produced. The car was named after the team owner Jonathan France's son, William.

== Racing history ==
=== 2008 ===
Delivery of parts were delayed which meant that there was next to no testing done on the new car before the first round of the Le Mans Series. Two cars were brought to the opening round at Catalunya with drivers Mário Haberfeld and Warren Hughes in the #45 and Jonny Kane and Joey Foster in the #46. The #45 qualified 19th and the #46 qualified in 22nd. In the race, a steering component failed on one car with the other retiring as a safety precaution.

At the following race at Monza, Embassy Racing finished eighth in class to score its first points with the WF01. The other car was running in the podium positions before stopping with 30 minutes left in the race.

The 1000 km of Spa was a tumultuous race for the car. Joey Foster crashed the #46 car on the warm-up lap and the #45 retired with a similar problem from the last race.

The lineup for the 2008 24 Hours of Le Mans was announced on May 13. One car was entered with drivers Warren Hughes, Jonny Kane and Joey Foster. The car qualified 24th overall with a time of 3:39.926. During the race, the car would run into a multitude of issues beginning with an ECU problem that was fixed once it was recycled. Later on, the starter motor had to be replaced which cost the team 21 minutes in the pits rejoining the race in 35th. Joey Foster had an accident at the second chicane on the Mulsanne which resulted in damage to the front and rear of the car. The car was brought back to the pits but was subsequently retired after 17 hours.

The following race at the Nürburgring, the car would achieve its highest career finish with Darren Manning and Joey Foster finishing 11th overall and fourth in class.

In the final race of the Le Mans Series season at Silverstone, the #45 car was running in podium positions but after a pit stop, Jonny Kane missed the red light at the end of the pit lane and received a five minute post-race time penalty, dropping them to fifth in class. Despite the promising results in its debut season, the team folded two weeks later.

=== 2009 ===
The car made one last appearance at the season finale of the Le Mans Series at Silverstone. Team WFR received support from multiple sponsors to run the race with drivers, Warren Hughes, Darren Manning and Jody Firth. They would finish 14th overall and fourth in class.
