= 2004 British GT Championship =

Sports car racing season

2004 British GT

Seasons
- ← 2003 2005 →

The 2004 British GT season consisted of an eight-round series of sports car racing in the British GT Championship, with each round consisting of two races. The series was open to N-GT and GT Cup class cars. Jonathan Cocker won the N-GT Class Driver's Championship, whilst Adam Wilcox and Ni Amorim shared the GT Cup Driver's Championship.

== Entry list ==
=== N-GT ===
Entrant	Car	Engine	No.	Drivers	Rounds
(Australia) Emotional Engineering	Holden Monaro	Vauxhall 5.7L V8	31	(New Zealand) Aaron Slight	2
(Australia) Emotional Engineering	Holden Monaro	Vauxhall 5.7L V8	31	(Republic of Ireland) Matt Griffin	2–6, 8
(Australia) Emotional Engineering	Holden Monaro	Vauxhall 5.7L V8	31	(United Kingdom) Matt Manderson	3–5, 8
(Australia) Emotional Engineering	Holden Monaro	Vauxhall 5.7L V8	31	(United Kingdom) Phil Bennett	6
(United Kingdom) JWR - John Guest/Paragon	Porsche 996 GT3-RS	Porsche 3.6L Flat-6	33	(United Kingdom) Mark Sumpter	All
(United Kingdom) JWR - John Guest/Paragon	Porsche 996 GT3-RS	Porsche 3.6L Flat-6	33	(United Kingdom) Mike Jordan	1-7
(United Kingdom) Scuderia Ecosse	Ferrari 360 Modena	Ferrari 3.6L V8	34	(United Kingdom) Tim Mullen	All
(United Kingdom) Scuderia Ecosse	Ferrari 360 Modena	Ferrari 3.6L V8	34	(Canada) Chris Niarchos	1–2, 4-8
(United Kingdom) Scuderia Ecosse	Ferrari 360 Modena	Ferrari 3.6L V8	34	(United Kingdom) Rob Barff	3
(United Kingdom) Scuderia Ecosse	Ferrari 360 Modena GTC	Ferrari 3.6L V8	35	(United Kingdom) Nathan Kinch	All
(United Kingdom) Scuderia Ecosse	Ferrari 360 Modena GTC	Ferrari 3.6L V8	35	(United Kingdom) Andrew Kirkaldy	All
(United Kingdom) Peninsula TVR/JCB	TVR Tuscan T400R	TVR 4.0L V6	36	(United Kingdom) Graeme Mundy	1, 3-6
(United Kingdom) Peninsula TVR/JCB	TVR Tuscan T400R	TVR 4.0L V6	36	(United Kingdom) John Hartshorne	1, 3–6, 8
(United Kingdom) Peninsula TVR/JCB	TVR Tuscan T400R	TVR 4.0L V6	36	(United Kingdom) Dan Eagling	7-8
(United Kingdom) Rollcentre Racing	Mosler MT900R	Chevrolet 5.7L LS1 V8	37	(United Kingdom) Richard Stanton	1, 3-7
(United Kingdom) Rollcentre Racing	Mosler MT900R	Chevrolet 5.7L LS1 V8	37	(United Kingdom) Bobby Verdon-Roe	1
(United Kingdom) Rollcentre Racing	Mosler MT900R	Chevrolet 5.7L LS1 V8	37	(United Kingdom) Patrick Pearce	3-7
(United Kingdom) GruppeM/Tech 9 Motorsport	Porsche 996 GT3-RSR	Porsche 3.6L Flat-6	38	(United Kingdom) Jonathan Cocker	All
(United Kingdom) GruppeM/Tech 9 Motorsport	Porsche 996 GT3-RSR	Porsche 3.6L Flat-6	38	(United Kingdom) Tim Sugden	1–4, 6-8
(United Kingdom) GruppeM/Tech 9 Motorsport	Porsche 996 GT3-RSR	Porsche 3.6L Flat-6	38	(United Kingdom) Warren Hughes	5
(United Kingdom) Tech 9 Motorsport	Porsche 996 GT3-RS	Porsche 3.6L Flat-6	46	(United Kingdom) Mark Cole	8
(United Kingdom) Tech 9 Motorsport	Porsche 996 GT3-RS	Porsche 3.6L Flat-6	46	(United Kingdom) Adam Jones	8
(United Kingdom) Damax	Ferrari 360 Modena	Ferrari 3.6L V8	39	(United Kingdom) Marco Attard	1
(United Kingdom) Damax	Ferrari 360 Modena	Ferrari 3.6L V8	39	(United Kingdom) Nick Adams	1
(United Kingdom) RSR Motorsport	TVR Tuscan T400R	TVR 4.0L V6	40	(United Kingdom) Nigel Greensall	1–4, 6, 8
(United Kingdom) RSR Motorsport	TVR Tuscan T400R	TVR 4.0L V6	40	(United Kingdom) Lawrence Tomlinson	1–3, 6, 8
(United Kingdom) RSR Motorsport	TVR Tuscan T400R	TVR 4.0L V6	40	(United Kingdom) Jonathan Coleman	4
(United Kingdom) RSR Motorsport	TVR Tuscan T400R	TVR 4.0L V6	41	(United Kingdom) Jonathan Coleman	5–6, 8
(United Kingdom) RSR Motorsport	TVR Tuscan T400R	TVR 4.0L V6	41	(United Kingdom) Rob Croydon	5-6
(United Kingdom) RSR Motorsport	TVR Tuscan T400R	TVR 4.0L V6	41	(United Kingdom) Michael Caine	8
(United Kingdom) Balfe Motorsport	Mosler MT900R	Chevrolet 5.7L LS1 V8	42	(United Kingdom) Shaun Balfe	1, 7
(United Kingdom) Balfe Motorsport	Mosler MT900R	Chevrolet 5.7L LS1 V8	42	(United Kingdom) Nigel Taylor	1, 7
(United Kingdom) Vic Lee Racing	Porsche 996 GT3-R	Porsche 3.6L Flat-6	43	(United Kingdom) Ian Khan	1
(United Kingdom) Vic Lee Racing	Porsche 996 GT3-R	Porsche 3.6L Flat-6	43	(Netherlands) Peter Kox	1
(United Kingdom) Preci Spark	Porsche 996 GT3-R	Porsche 3.6L Flat-6	44	(United Kingdom) David Jones	1-7
(United Kingdom) Preci Spark	Porsche 996 GT3-R	Porsche 3.6L Flat-6	44	(United Kingdom) Godfrey Jones	1-7
(United Kingdom) Master Motorsport	Ultima GTR	Chevrolet V8	47	(United Kingdom) Steven Brady	3–6, 8
(United Kingdom) Master Motorsport	Ultima GTR	Chevrolet V8	47	(United Kingdom) Alan Bonner	3–6, 8
(United Kingdom) Bryan Colwell	Porsche 911 GT2	Porsche 3.6L Flat-6	50	(United Kingdom) Bryan Colwell	8
(United Kingdom) Bryan Colwell	Porsche 911 GT2	Porsche 3.6L Flat-6	50	(Sweden) Jan Persson	8
(United Kingdom) Xero Competition	Chevrolet Corvette C5 LMGT	Chevrolet 5.7L LS1 V8	51	(United Kingdom) Ricky Cole	1-7
(United Kingdom) Xero Competition	Chevrolet Corvette C5 LMGT	Chevrolet 5.7L LS1 V8	51	(Republic of Ireland) Peter Le Bas	1-7
(France) Paul Belmondo Racing	Lamborghini Diablo	Lamborghini 5.0L V12	52	(France) Jean-Michel Pappolla	6
(France) Paul Belmondo Racing	Lamborghini Diablo	Lamborghini 5.0L V12	52	(France) Didier Sommereau	6
(United Kingdom) Embassy Racing	Chevrolet Corvette C5 LMGT	Chevrolet 5.7L LS V8	55	(New Zealand) Neil Cunningham	All
(United Kingdom) Embassy Racing	Chevrolet Corvette C5 LMGT	Chevrolet 5.7L LS V8	55	(United Kingdom) Paula Cook	1-6
(United Kingdom) Embassy Racing	Chevrolet Corvette C5 LMGT	Chevrolet 5.7L LS V8	55	(United Kingdom) Ben Collins	7
(United Kingdom) Embassy Racing	Chevrolet Corvette C5 LMGT	Chevrolet 5.7L LS V8	55	(United Kingdom) Richard Hay	8
(United Kingdom) Eclipse Motorsport	TVR Tuscan T400R	TVR 4.0L V6	60	(United Kingdom) Steve Hyde	1–3, 5–6, 8
(United Kingdom) Eclipse Motorsport	TVR Tuscan T400R	TVR 4.0L V6	60	(United Kingdom) Piers Johnson	1–3, 5–6, 8

=== GT Cup ===
Entrant	Car	Engine	No.	Drivers	Rounds
(United Kingdom) Team Jedi Racing	Lotus Elise Sport	Rover 1.8L I4	61	(United Kingdom) Rob Horsfield	All
(United Kingdom) Team Jedi Racing	Lotus Elise Sport	Rover 1.8L I4	61	(United Kingdom) Frazer Corbyn	1–3, 6-8
(United Kingdom) Team Jedi Racing	Lotus Elise Sport	Rover 1.8L I4	61	(United Kingdom) Ian Stinton	4-5
(United Kingdom) DRM Racing	Ferrari 360 Modena	Ferrari 3.6L V8	62	(United Kingdom) Adam Wilcox	All
(United Kingdom) DRM Racing	Ferrari 360 Modena	Ferrari 3.6L V8	62	(Portugal) Ni Amorim	All
(United Kingdom) DRM Racing	Ferrari 360 Modena	Ferrari 3.6L V8	67	(Portugal) Lourenço da Veiga	1–2, 7
(United Kingdom) DRM Racing	Ferrari 360 Modena	Ferrari 3.6L V8	67	(United Kingdom) Stephen Moore	1-2
(United Kingdom) DRM Racing	Ferrari 360 Modena	Ferrari 3.6L V8	67	(United Kingdom) Jamie Smyth	7-8
(United Kingdom) DRM Racing	Ferrari 360 Modena	Ferrari 3.6L V8	67	(United Kingdom) Rob Croydon	8
(United Kingdom) Jensen Motorsport	Chevrolet Corvette C5 LMGT	Chevrolet 5.7L LS V8	63	(United Kingdom) Ryan Hooker	1-7
(United Kingdom) Jensen Motorsport	Chevrolet Corvette C5 LMGT	Chevrolet 5.7L LS V8	63	(United Kingdom) Dominic Lesniewski	1-3
(United Kingdom) Jensen Motorsport	Chevrolet Corvette C5 LMGT	Chevrolet 5.7L LS V8	63	(United Kingdom) Andrew Ward	4-5
(United Kingdom) Jensen Motorsport	Chevrolet Corvette C5 LMGT	Chevrolet 5.7L LS V8	63	(United Kingdom) Paul Horton	6-7
(United Kingdom) Atlanta Motorsport	Renault Clio	Renault 3.0L V6	64	(United Kingdom) Darren Malkin	1, 3
(United Kingdom) Atlanta Motorsport	Renault Clio	Renault 3.0L V6	64	(United Kingdom) Alan Bonner	1
(United Kingdom) Atlanta Motorsport	Renault Clio	Renault 3.0L V6	64	(United Kingdom) Enzo Mucci	3
(United Kingdom) Team Jedi Racing	Lotus Elise Sport	Rover 1.8L I4	65	(United Kingdom) Dean Lanzante	1-2
(United Kingdom) Team Jedi Racing	Lotus Elise Sport	Rover 1.8L I4	65	(United Kingdom) Chris Yandell	1-2
(United Kingdom) JWR - Chambers Runfold PLC	Porsche 996 GT3 Cup	Porsche 3.6L Flat-6	66	(United Kingdom) Peter Chambers	1-7
(United Kingdom) JWR - Chambers Runfold PLC	Porsche 996 GT3 Cup	Porsche 3.6L Flat-6	66	(United Kingdom) Graeme Langford	1-4
(United Kingdom) JWR - Chambers Runfold PLC	Porsche 996 GT3 Cup	Porsche 3.6L Flat-6	66	(United Kingdom) Michael Caine	5-7
(United Kingdom) Bintec	ProSport 3000	Ford Cosworth 3.0L V6	69	(United Kingdom) Barry Murphy	1-2
(United Kingdom) Bintec	ProSport 3000	Ford Cosworth 3.0L V6	69	(United Kingdom) Jon Lee	1-2
(United Kingdom) ABG Motorsport	Porsche 996 GT3 Cup	Porsche 3.6L Flat-6	70	(United Kingdom) Colin Broster	2, 4-6
(United Kingdom) ABG Motorsport	Porsche 996 GT3 Cup	Porsche 3.6L Flat-6	70	(United Kingdom) Paul Mace	2
(United Kingdom) ABG Motorsport	Porsche 996 GT3 Cup	Porsche 3.6L Flat-6	70	(United Kingdom) Tony Brown	4-6
(United Kingdom) Lester/Glenvarigill Racing	Ferrari 360 Modena	Ferrari 3.6L V8	71	(United Kingdom) Hector Lester	1–2, 5, 8
(United Kingdom) Lester/Glenvarigill Racing	Ferrari 360 Modena	Ferrari 3.6L V8	71	(United Kingdom) Keith Robinson	1-2
(United Kingdom) Lester/Glenvarigill Racing	Ferrari 360 Modena	Ferrari 3.6L V8	71	(Denmark) Allan Simonsen	5, 8
(United Kingdom) Rollcentre Racing	Noble M12 GTO3R	Ford 3.0L V6	73	(Belgium) Fanny Duchateau	1-5
(United Kingdom) Rollcentre Racing	Noble M12 GTO3R	Ford 3.0L V6	73	(United Kingdom) Simon Pullan	1-4
(United Kingdom) Rollcentre Racing	Noble M12 GTO3R	Ford 3.0L V6	73	(United Kingdom) Martin Short	5-7
(United Kingdom) Rollcentre Racing	Noble M12 GTO3R	Ford 3.0L V6	73	(United Kingdom) Harvey Death	6
(United Kingdom) Rollcentre Racing	Noble M12 GTO3R	Ford 3.0L V6	73	(United Kingdom) David Mason	7
(United Kingdom) Tech 9 Motorsport	Porsche 996 GT3 Cup	Porsche 3.6L Flat-6	74	(United Kingdom) David Wandless	7-8
(United Kingdom) Tech 9 Motorsport	Porsche 996 GT3 Cup	Porsche 3.6L Flat-6	74	(United Kingdom) Mark Cole	7
(United Kingdom) Tech 9 Motorsport	Porsche 996 GT3 Cup	Porsche 3.6L Flat-6	74	(India) Phiroze Bilmoria	8
(United Kingdom) GruppeM/Tech 9 Motorsport	Porsche 996 GT3 Cup	Porsche 3.6L Flat-6	76	(United Kingdom) Jonathan Rowland	1-4
(United Kingdom) GruppeM/Tech 9 Motorsport	Porsche 996 GT3 Cup	Porsche 3.6L Flat-6	76	(United Kingdom) Phil Hindley	1
(United Kingdom) GruppeM/Tech 9 Motorsport	Porsche 996 GT3 Cup	Porsche 3.6L Flat-6	76	(United Kingdom) Adam Sharpe	2-8
(United Kingdom) GruppeM/Tech 9 Motorsport	Porsche 996 GT3 Cup	Porsche 3.6L Flat-6	76	(United Kingdom) Dominic Lesniewski	5-8
(United Kingdom) Colin Blower Motorsport	Vauxhall VX220	Vauxhall 2.0L I4	75	(United Kingdom) Dan Eagling	1-5
(United Kingdom) Colin Blower Motorsport	Vauxhall VX220	Vauxhall 2.0L I4	75	(United Kingdom) Rob Croydon	1-2
(United Kingdom) Colin Blower Motorsport	Vauxhall VX220	Vauxhall 2.0L I4	75	(United Kingdom) Colin Blower	3-5
(United Kingdom) JWR-Cambridge Business Travel	Porsche 996 GT3 Cup	Porsche 3.6L Flat-6	77	(United Kingdom) Steve Wood	All
(United Kingdom) JWR-Cambridge Business Travel	Porsche 996 GT3 Cup	Porsche 3.6L Flat-6	77	(United Kingdom) Stuart Scott	All
(United Kingdom) Damax	Ferrari 360 Modena	Ferrari 3.6L V8	78	(United Kingdom) Marco Attard	3, 6, 8
(United Kingdom) Damax	Ferrari 360 Modena	Ferrari 3.6L V8	78	(United Kingdom) Nick Adams	3, 6, 8
(United Kingdom) Damax	Ferrari 360 Modena	Ferrari 3.6L V8	79	(United Kingdom) David Back	1
(United Kingdom) Damax	Ferrari 360 Modena	Ferrari 3.6L V8	79	(United Kingdom) Chris Catt	1
(United Kingdom) Team Tiger	Marcos Mantis	Ford 4.6L V8	81	(United Kingdom) Chris Beighton	All
(United Kingdom) Team Tiger	Marcos Mantis	Ford 4.6L V8	81	(United Kingdom) Jon Finnemore	All
(United Kingdom) VRS Motor Finance	Ferrari 360 Modena Challenge	Ferrari 3.6L V8	84	(United Kingdom) Phil Burton	8
(United Kingdom) VRS Motor Finance	Ferrari 360 Modena Challenge	Ferrari 3.6L V8	84	(United Kingdom) Ian Flux	8
(United Kingdom) Gavan Kershaw Racing	Lotus Elise Sport	Rover 1.8L I4	88	(United Kingdom) Gavan Kershaw	All
(United Kingdom) Gavan Kershaw Racing	Lotus Elise Sport	Rover 1.8L I4	88	(United Kingdom) Barrie Whight	All
(United Kingdom) Team Aero Lewis Racing	Morgan Aero 8 GT	BMW N62 4.8L V8	99	(United Kingdom) Keith Ahlers	All
(United Kingdom) Team Aero Lewis Racing	Morgan Aero 8 GT	BMW N62 4.8L V8	99	(United Kingdom) Aaron Scott	All

== Calendar and results ==
Round	Circuit	Date	NGT Winners	GTC Winners
1	(United Kingdom) Donington Park	3 April	(United Kingdom) No. 33 JWR-John Guest/Paragon (United Kingdom) Mark Sumpter (United Kingdom) Mike Jordan	(United Kingdom) No. 76 GruppeM/Tech 9 Motorsport (United Kingdom) Jonathan Rowland (United Kingdom) Phil Hindley
2	(United Kingdom) Donington Park	4 April	(United Kingdom) No. 35 Scuderia Ecosse (United Kingdom) Nathan Kinch (United Kingdom) Andrew Kirkaldy	(United Kingdom) No. 76 GruppeM/Tech 9 Motorsport (United Kingdom) Jonathan Rowland (United Kingdom) Phil Hindley
3	(Republic of Ireland) Mondello Park	8 May	(United Kingdom) No. 38 GruppeM/Tech 9 Motorsport (United Kingdom) Jonathan Cocker (United Kingdom) Tim Sugden	(United Kingdom) No. 76 GruppeM/Tech 9 Motorsport (United Kingdom) Jonathan Rowland (United Kingdom) Adam Sharpe
4	(Republic of Ireland) Mondello Park	9 May	(United Kingdom) No. 38 GruppeM/Tech 9 Motorsport (United Kingdom) Jonathan Cocker (United Kingdom) Tim Sugden	(United Kingdom) No. 88 Gavan Kershaw Racing (United Kingdom) Barrie Whight (United Kingdom) Gavan Kershaw
5	(United Kingdom) Snetterton	5 June	(United Kingdom) No. 35 Scuderia Ecosse (United Kingdom) Nathan Kinch (United Kingdom) Andrew Kirkaldy	(United Kingdom) No. 81 Team Tiger (United Kingdom) Chris Beighton (United Kingdom) Jon Finnemore
6	(United Kingdom) Snetterton	5 June	(United Kingdom) No. 35 Scuderia Ecosse (United Kingdom) Nathan Kinch (United Kingdom) Andrew Kirkaldy	(United Kingdom) No. 76 GruppeM/Tech 9 Motorsport (United Kingdom) Adam Sharpe (United Kingdom) Jonathan Rowland
7	(United Kingdom) Castle Combe	19 June	(United Kingdom) No. 38 GruppeM/Tech 9 Motorsport (United Kingdom) Jonathan Cocker (United Kingdom) Tim Sugden	(United Kingdom) No. 88 Gavan Kershaw Racing (United Kingdom) Barrie Whight (United Kingdom) Gavan Kershaw
8	(United Kingdom) Castle Combe	20 June	(United Kingdom) No. 33 JWR-John Guest/Paragon (United Kingdom) Mark Sumpter (United Kingdom) Mike Jordan	(United Kingdom) No. 88 Gavan Kershaw Racing (United Kingdom) Barrie Whight (United Kingdom) Gavan Kershaw
9	(United Kingdom) Oulton Park	17 July	(United Kingdom) No. 60 Eclipse Motorsport (United Kingdom) Piers Johnson (United Kingdom) Steve Hyde	(United Kingdom) No. 88 Gavan Kershaw Racing (United Kingdom) Barrie Whight (United Kingdom) Gavan Kershaw
10	(United Kingdom) Oulton Park	18 July	(United Kingdom) No. 38 GruppeM/Tech 9 Motorsport (United Kingdom) Jonathan Cocker (United Kingdom) Warren Hughes	(United Kingdom) No. 76 GruppeM/Tech 9 Motorsport (United Kingdom) Adam Sharpe (United Kingdom) Dominic Lesniewski
11	(United Kingdom) Silverstone	14 August	(United Kingdom) No. 35 Scuderia Ecosse (United Kingdom) Nathan Kinch (United Kingdom) Andrew Kirkaldy	(United Kingdom) No. 62 DRM Racing (United Kingdom) Adam Wilcox (Portugal) Ni Amorim
12	(United Kingdom) Silverstone	15 August	(United Kingdom) No. 38 GruppeM/Tech 9 Motorsport (United Kingdom) Jonathan Cocker (United Kingdom) Tim Sugden	(United Kingdom) No. 78 Damax (United Kingdom) Marco Attard (United Kingdom) Nick Adams
13	(United Kingdom) Thruxton	29 August	(United Kingdom) No. 34 Scuderia Ecosse (United Kingdom) Tim Mullen (Canada) Chris Niarchos	(United Kingdom) No. 81 Team Tiger (United Kingdom) Chris Beighton (United Kingdom) Jon Finnemore
14	(United Kingdom) Thruxton	30 August	(United Kingdom) No. 35 Scuderia Ecosse (United Kingdom) Nathan Kinch (United Kingdom) Andrew Kirkaldy	(United Kingdom) No. 81 Team Tiger (United Kingdom) Chris Beighton (United Kingdom) Jon Finnemore
15	(United Kingdom) Brands Hatch	1 October	(United Kingdom) No. 38 GruppeM/Tech 9 Motorsport (United Kingdom) Jonathan Cocker (United Kingdom) Tim Sugden	(United Kingdom) No. 78 Damax (United Kingdom) Marco Attard (United Kingdom) Nick Adams
16	(United Kingdom) Brands Hatch	3 October	(United Kingdom) No. 35 Scuderia Ecosse (United Kingdom) Nathan Kinch (United Kingdom) Andrew Kirkaldy	(United Kingdom) No. 76 GruppeM/Tech 9 Motorsport (United Kingdom) Adam Sharpe (United Kingdom) Dominic Lesniewski

== Championship standings ==
=== Drivers' Championships ===
==== N-GT ====
Pos	Driver	DON (United Kingdom)		MON (Republic of Ireland)		SNE (United Kingdom)		CAS (United Kingdom)		OUL (United Kingdom)		SIL (United Kingdom)		THR (United Kingdom)		BRH (United Kingdom)		Pts
1	(United Kingdom) Jonathan Cocker	3	5	1	1	2	2	1	2	6	1	2	1	2	**3**	**1**	3	125
2	(United Kingdom) Tim Sugden	3	5	1	1	2	2	1	2			2	1	2	**3**	**1**	3	112
3	(United Kingdom) Nathan Kinch	7	1	4	**3**	**1**	**1**	Ret	Ret	2	**2**	**1**	**3**	6	1	Ret	**1**	98
3	(United Kingdom) Andrew Kirkaldy	7	1	4	**3**	**1**	**1**	Ret	Ret	2	**2**	**1**	**3**	6	1	Ret	**1**	98
4	(United Kingdom) Mark Sumpter	**1**	7	**10**	2	Ret	4	**3**	1	**3**	4	10	Ret	10	4	4	5	66
5	(United Kingdom) Mike Jordan	**1**	7	**10**	2	Ret	4	**3**	1	**3**	4	10	Ret	10	4	WD	WD	57
6	(United Kingdom) Tim Mullen	14	9	3	5	4	6	5	6	DNS	5	3	4	1	8	5	Ret	55
7	(Canada) Chris Niarchos	14	9	3	5			5	6	DNS	5	3	4	1	8	5	Ret	47
8	(United Kingdom) Piers Johnson	9	Ret	9	Ret	5	5			1	3	7	7			3	4	39
8	(United Kingdom) Steve Hyde	9	Ret	9	Ret	5	5			1	3	7	7			3	4	39
9	(United Kingdom) Richard Stanton	6	6			6	7	4	**3**	5	6	6	Ret	3	9			38
10	(New Zealand) Neil Cunningham	10	4	6	6	9	DNS	Ret	DNS	Ret	7	5	5	5	2	6	Ret	36
10	(United Kingdom) Godfrey Jones	5	Ret	2	NC	3	3	7	Ret	Ret	10	Ret	2	9	7			36
10	(United Kingdom) David Jones	5	Ret	2	NC	3	3	7	Ret	Ret	10	Ret	2	9	7			36
11	(United Kingdom) Nigel Greensall	8	2	5	4	Ret	Ret	Ret	5			4	Ret			2	Ret	35
12	(United Kingdom) Patrick Pearce					6	7	4	**3**	5	6	6	Ret	3	9			32
13	(United Kingdom) Lawrence Tomlinson	8	2	5	4	Ret	Ret					4	Ret			2	Ret	31
14	(United Kingdom) Ricky Cole	12	8	7	7	8	Ret	2	Ret	Ret	Ret	8	6	8	5			23
14	(Republic of Ireland) Peter Le Bas	12	8	7	7	8	Ret	2	Ret	Ret	Ret	8	6	8	5			23
15	(United Kingdom) Paula Cook	10	4	6	6	9	DNS	Ret	DNS	Ret	7	5	5					21
16	(United Kingdom) Steven Brady	WD	WD	WD	WD	Ret	Ret	6	4	DNS	9	DNS	DNS			Ret	2	16
16	(United Kingdom) Alan Bonner					Ret	Ret	6	4	DNS	9	DNS	DNS			Ret	2	16
16	(United Kingdom) John Hartshorne	13	Ret			7	8	DNS	7	4	8	WD	WD			7	6	16
17	(United Kingdom) Ian Khan	2	**3**															14
17	(Netherlands) Peter Kox	2	**3**															14
18	(United Kingdom) Warren Hughes									6	1							13
19	(United Kingdom) Ben Collins													5	2			12
20	(United Kingdom) Graeme Mundy	13	Ret			7	8	DNS	7	4	8	WD	WD					11
21	(United Kingdom) Nigel Taylor	4	Ret											**4**	DNS			10
21	(United Kingdom) Shaun Balfe	4	Ret											**4**	DNS			10
21	(United Kingdom) Dan Eagling													7	6	7	6	10
22	(United Kingdom) Rob Barff					4	6											8
23	(United Kingdom) Bobby Verdon-Roe	6	6															6
23	(Republic of Ireland) Matt Griffin			8	8	Ret	9	Ret	8	7	12	Ret	DNS			8	Ret	6
24	(United Kingdom) Jonathan Coleman							Ret	5	8	DNS	9	Ret			DNS	Ret	5
25	(United Kingdom) Matt Manderson					Ret	9	Ret	8	7	12					8	Ret	4
26	(United Kingdom) Richard Hay															6	Ret	3
27	(New Zealand) Aaron Slight			8	8													2
27	(Sweden) Jan Persson															DNS	7	2
27	(United Kingdom) Brian Colwell					WD	WD									DNS	7	2
28	(United Kingdom) Rob Croydon									8	DNS	9	Ret					1
	(France) Jean-Michel Pappolla											11	Ret					0
	(France) Didier Sommereau											11	Ret					0
	(United Kingdom) Mark Cole															Ret	Ret	0
	(United Kingdom) Adam Jones															Ret	Ret	0
	(United Kingdom) Phil Bennett											Ret	DNS					0
	(United Kingdom) Michael Caine															DNS	Ret	0
Pos	Driver	DON (United Kingdom)		MON (Republic of Ireland)		SNE (United Kingdom)		CAS (United Kingdom)		OUL (United Kingdom)		SIL (United Kingdom)		THR (United Kingdom)		BRH (United Kingdom)		Pts

Colour	Result
Gold	Winner
Silver	Second place
Bronze	Third place
Green	Points classification
Blue	Non-points classification
Blue	Non-classified finish (NC)
Purple	Retired, not classified (Ret)
Red	Did not qualify (DNQ)
Red	Did not pre-qualify (DNPQ)
Black	Disqualified (DSQ)
White	Did not start (DNS)
White	Withdrew (WD)
White	Race cancelled (C)
Blank	Did not practice (DNP)
Blank	Did not arrive (DNA)
Blank	Excluded (EX)

Note: bold signifies pole position, italics signifies fastest lap.

Points were awarded as follows: 10-8-6-5-4-3-2-1 from first to eighth.

==== GT Cup ====
Pos	Driver	DON (United Kingdom)		MON (Republic of Ireland)		SNE (United Kingdom)		CAS (United Kingdom)		OUL (United Kingdom)		SIL (United Kingdom)		THR (United Kingdom)		BRH (United Kingdom)		Pts
1	(United Kingdom) Adam Wilcox	**2**	2	3	4	3	Ret	6	4	Ret	6	1	**3**	4	2	4	2	86
1	(Portugal) Ni Amorim	**2**	2	3	4	3	Ret	6	4	Ret	6	1	**3**	4	2	4	2	86
2	(United Kingdom) Adam Sharpe			1	5	DNS	**1**	7	3	7	1	2	9	6	3	Ret	**1**	71
3	(United Kingdom) Barrie Whight	3	Ret	**5**	1	**4**	Ret	**1**	**1**	**1**	2	**Ret**	4	**Ret**	7	**Ret**	11	70
3	(United Kingdom) Gavan Kershaw	3	Ret	**5**	1	**4**	Ret	**1**	**1**	**1**	2	**Ret**	4	**Ret**	7	**Ret**	11	70
4	(United Kingdom) Chris Beighton	Ret	Ret	DNS	6	1	Ret	2	2	2	10	8	5	1	1	DNS	7	64
4	(United Kingdom) Jon Finnemore	Ret	Ret	DNS	6	1	Ret	2	2	2	10	8	5	1	1	DNS	7	64
5	(United Kingdom) Jonathan Rowland	1	**1**	1	5	DNS	**1**	7	3									54
6	(United Kingdom) Pete Chambers	5	10	8	7	2	2	Ret	8	Ret	4	Ret	2	5	4	WD	WD	46
7	(United Kingdom) Aaron Scott	6	3	4	12	Ret	4	4	9	6	8	5	8	DNS	DNS	3	3	45
7	(United Kingdom) Keith Ahlers	6	3	4	12	Ret	4	4	9	6	8	5	8	DNS	DNS	3	3	45
7	(United Kingdom) Dominic Lesniewski	Ret	Ret	Ret	DNS	Ret	3			7	1	2	9	6	3	Ret	**1**	45
8	(United Kingdom) Marco Attard					6	5					3	1			1	9	33
8	(United Kingdom) Nick Adams					6	5					3	1			1	9	33
9	(United Kingdom) Colin Broster			6	3			5	7	3	3	4	Ret					32
9	(United Kingdom) Rob Croydon	9	Ret	DNS	DNS			3	4							7	6	32
10	(United Kingdom) Stuart Scott	8	6	7	9	5	7	Ret	10	5	7	6	10	8	5	6	8	30
10	(United Kingdom) Steven Wood	8	6	7	9	5	7	Ret	10	5	7	6	10	8	5	6	8	30
11	(Belgium) Fanny Duchateau	4	8	2	**2**	DNS	Ret	9	6	Ret	Ret							25
11	(United Kingdom) Simon Pullan	4	8	2	**2**	DNS	Ret	9	6									25
12	(United Kingdom) Graeme Langford	5	10	8	7	2	2	Ret	8									24
12	(United Kingdom) Tony Brown							5	7	3	3	4	Ret					23
13	(United Kingdom) Michael Caine									Ret	4	Ret	2	5	4	WD	WD	22
13	(United Kingdom) Hector Lester	DNS	DNS	9	11					4	**5**					2	4	22
13	(Denmark) Allan Simonsen									4	**5**					2	4	22
14	(United Kingdom) Phil Hindley	1	**1**															20
15	(United Kingdom) Ryan Hooker	Ret	Ret	Ret	DNS	Ret	3	8	11	8	9	7	6	Ret	6			16
16	(United Kingdom) David Wandless													2	Ret	6	5	15
17	(United Kingdom) Dan Eagling	9	Ret	DNS	DNS	Ret	6	3	5	DNS	Ret	WD	WD					13
17	(United Kingdom) Colin Blower					Ret	6	3	5	DNS	Ret	WD	WD					13
18	(United Kingdom) Paul Mace			6	3													9
18	(Portugal) Lourenço da Veiga	7	4	Ret	DNS	WD	WD	WD	WD	WD	WD	WD	WD	7	Ret			9
19	(United Kingdom) Martin Short									Ret	Ret	Ret	7	3	**Ret**			8
19	(United Kingdom) Mark Cole													2	Ret			8
19	(United Kingdom) Paul Horton											7	6	Ret	6			8
20	(United Kingdom) Stephen Moore	7	4	Ret	DNS													7
20	(India) Phiroze Bilmoria															6	5	7
20	(United Kingdom) Jamie Smyth													7	Ret	7	6	7
21	(United Kingdom) David Mason													3	**Ret**			6
22	(United Kingdom) Dean Lanzante	Ret	5	Ret	8	WD	WD											5
22	(United Kingdom) Chris Yandell	Ret	5	Ret	8	WD	WD											5
23	(United Kingdom) Ian Flux															5	10	4
23	(United Kingdom) Phil Burton															5	10	4
24	(United Kingdom) David Back	Ret	7									WD	WD					2
24	(United Kingdom) Christopher Catt	Ret	7															2
24	(United Kingdom) Harvey Death											Ret	7					2
24	(United Kingdom) Andrew Ward							8	11	8	9							2
25	(United Kingdom) Rob Horsfield	10	9	10	10	DNS	DNS	Ret	NC	Ret	Ret	Ret	DNS	Ret	8	Ret	DNS	1
25	(United Kingdom) Frazer Corbyn	10	9	10	10	DNS	DNS	WD	WD			Ret	DNS	Ret	8	Ret	DNS	1
	(United Kingdom) Keith Robinson	DNS	DNS	9	11													0
	(United Kingdom) Darren Malkin	11	Ret	WD	WD	DNS	DNS											0
	(United Kingdom) Alan Bonner	11	Ret															0
	(United Kingdom) Ian Stinton							Ret	NC	Ret	Ret							0
	(United Kingdom) Barry Murphy	Ret	DNS	Ret	DNS													0
	(United Kingdom) Jon Lee	Ret	DNS	Ret	DNS													0
	(United Kingdom) Enzo Mucci					DNS	DNS											0
Pos	Driver	DON (United Kingdom)		MON (Republic of Ireland)		SNE (United Kingdom)		CAS (United Kingdom)		OUL (United Kingdom)		SIL (United Kingdom)		THR (United Kingdom)		BRH (United Kingdom)		Pts

Colour	Result
Gold	Winner
Silver	Second place
Bronze	Third place
Green	Points classification
Blue	Non-points classification
Blue	Non-classified finish (NC)
Purple	Retired, not classified (Ret)
Red	Did not qualify (DNQ)
Red	Did not pre-qualify (DNPQ)
Black	Disqualified (DSQ)
White	Did not start (DNS)
White	Withdrew (WD)
White	Race cancelled (C)
Blank	Did not practice (DNP)
Blank	Did not arrive (DNA)
Blank	Excluded (EX)

Note: bold signifies pole position, italics signifies fastest lap.

Points were awarded as follows: 10-8-6-5-4-3-2-1 from first to eighth.
