= 2008 1000 km of Monza =

Layout of the Autodromo Nazionale Monza

The 2008 1000 km of Monza was the second round of the 2008 Le Mans Series season. It took place at the Autodromo Nazionale Monza, Italy, on 27 April 2008. This event was the last.

Monégasque driver Stéphane Ortelli was injured in an incident during the race in which his Oreca-Courage Le Mans prototype became airborne in the first chicane. The car flipped several times, and Ortelli suffered a broken ankle. Ortelli's car narrowly missed hitting the #1 Audi R10 driven by Allan McNish. McNish had to weave his way through the debris of the crash.

== Race results ==
Class winners in bold. Cars failing to complete 70% of winner's distance marked as Not Classified (NC).

Pos	Class	No	Team	Drivers	Chassis	Tyre	Laps
Pos	Class	No	Team	Drivers	Engine	Tyre	Laps
1	**LMP1**	**8**	**(France) Team Peugeot Total**	**(France) Stéphane Sarrazin (Portugal) Pedro Lamy**	**Peugeot 908 HDi FAP**	MI	**173**
1	**LMP1**	**8**	**(France) Team Peugeot Total**	**(France) Stéphane Sarrazin (Portugal) Pedro Lamy**	**Peugeot HDi 5.5 L Turbo V12 (Diesel)**	MI	**173**
2	LMP1	2	(Germany) Audi Sport Team Joest	(France) Alexandre Prémat (Germany) Mike Rockenfeller	Audi R10	MI	173
2	LMP1	2	(Germany) Audi Sport Team Joest	(France) Alexandre Prémat (Germany) Mike Rockenfeller	Audi TDI 5.5 L Turbo V12 (Diesel)	MI	173
3	LMP1	17	(France) Pescarolo Sport	(Switzerland) Harold Primat (France) Christophe Tinseau	Pescarolo 01	MI	169
3	LMP1	17	(France) Pescarolo Sport	(Switzerland) Harold Primat (France) Christophe Tinseau	Judd GV5.5 S2 5.5 L V10	MI	169
4	LMP1	15	(United Kingdom) Creation Autosportif	(United Kingdom) Robbie Kerr (United Kingdom) Stuart Hall (France) Bruce Jouanny	Creation CA07	D	169
4	LMP1	15	(United Kingdom) Creation Autosportif	(United Kingdom) Robbie Kerr (United Kingdom) Stuart Hall (France) Bruce Jouanny	AIM (Judd) YS5.5 5.5 L V10	D	169
5	LMP1	7	(France) Team Peugeot Total	(France) Nicolas Minassian (Spain) Marc Gené	Peugeot 908 HDi FAP	MI	167
5	LMP1	7	(France) Team Peugeot Total	(France) Nicolas Minassian (Spain) Marc Gené	Peugeot HDi 5.5 L Turbo V12 (Diesel)	MI	167
6	LMP1	1	(Germany) Audi Sport Team Joest	(United Kingdom) Allan McNish (Italy) Rinaldo Capello	Audi R10	MI	166
6	LMP1	1	(Germany) Audi Sport Team Joest	(United Kingdom) Allan McNish (Italy) Rinaldo Capello	Audi TDI 5.5 L Turbo V12 (Diesel)	MI	166
7	LMP1	18	(United Kingdom) Rollcentre Racing	(United Kingdom) Martin Short (United Kingdom) Duncan Tappy (Belgium) Vanina Ickx	Pescarolo 01	D	166
7	LMP1	18	(United Kingdom) Rollcentre Racing	(United Kingdom) Martin Short (United Kingdom) Duncan Tappy (Belgium) Vanina Ickx	Judd GV5.5 S2 5.5 L V10	D	166
8	**LMP2**	**31**	**(Denmark) Team Essex**	**(Denmark) Casper Elgaard (Denmark) John Nielsen**	**Porsche RS Spyder Evo**	D	**165**
8	**LMP2**	**31**	**(Denmark) Team Essex**	**(Denmark) Casper Elgaard (Denmark) John Nielsen**	**Porsche MR6 3.4 L V8**	D	**165**
9	LMP2	34	(Netherlands) Van Merksteijn Motorsport (Netherlands) Equipe Verschuur	(Netherlands) Peter van Merksteijn (Netherlands) Jos Verstappen	Porsche RS Spyder Evo	MI	165
9	LMP2	34	(Netherlands) Van Merksteijn Motorsport (Netherlands) Equipe Verschuur	(Netherlands) Peter van Merksteijn (Netherlands) Jos Verstappen	Porsche MR6 3.4 L V8	MI	165
10	LMP2	27	(Switzerland) Horag Racing	(Switzerland) Fredy Lienhard (Belgium) Didier Theys (Netherlands) Jan Lammers	Porsche RS Spyder Evo	MI	164
10	LMP2	27	(Switzerland) Horag Racing	(Switzerland) Fredy Lienhard (Belgium) Didier Theys (Netherlands) Jan Lammers	Porsche MR6 3.4 L V8	MI	164
11	LMP2	25	(United Kingdom) Ray Mallock Ltd.	(United Kingdom) Mike Newton (Brazil) Thomas Erdos	MG-Lola EX265	MI	164
11	LMP2	25	(United Kingdom) Ray Mallock Ltd.	(United Kingdom) Mike Newton (Brazil) Thomas Erdos	MG (AER) XP21 2.0 L Turbo I4	MI	164
12	LMP2	35	(France) Saulnier Racing	(France) Pierre Ragues (France) Matthieu Lahaye	Pescarolo 01	MI	163
12	LMP2	35	(France) Saulnier Racing	(France) Pierre Ragues (France) Matthieu Lahaye	Judd DB 3.4 L V8	MI	163
13	LMP2	44	(Germany) Kruse Schiller Motorsport	(France) Jean de Pourtalès (Japan) Hideki Noda	Lola B05/40	D	162
13	LMP2	44	(Germany) Kruse Schiller Motorsport	(France) Jean de Pourtalès (Japan) Hideki Noda	Mazda MZR-R 2.0 L Turbo I4	D	162
14	LMP2	40	(Portugal) Quifel ASM Team	(Portugal) Miguel Amaral (France) Olivier Pla	Lola B05/40	D	161
14	LMP2	40	(Portugal) Quifel ASM Team	(Portugal) Miguel Amaral (France) Olivier Pla	AER P07 2.0 L Turbo I4	D	161
15	**GT1**	**59**	**(United Kingdom) Team Modena**	**(Czech Republic) Tomáš Enge (Spain) Antonio García**	**Aston Martin DBR9**	MI	**159**
15	**GT1**	**59**	**(United Kingdom) Team Modena**	**(Czech Republic) Tomáš Enge (Spain) Antonio García**	**Aston Martin 6.0 L V12**	MI	**159**
16	GT1	72	(France) Luc Alphand Aventures	(Monaco) Olivier Beretta (France) Guillaume Moreau (France) Patrice Goueslard	Chevrolet Corvette C6.R	MI	159
16	GT1	72	(France) Luc Alphand Aventures	(Monaco) Olivier Beretta (France) Guillaume Moreau (France) Patrice Goueslard	Chevrolet LS7-R 7.0 L V8	MI	159
17	LMP1	10	(Czech Republic) Charouz Racing System	(Czech Republic) Jan Charouz (Germany) Stefan Mücke	Lola B08/60	MI	158
17	LMP1	10	(Czech Republic) Charouz Racing System	(Czech Republic) Jan Charouz (Germany) Stefan Mücke	Aston Martin 6.0 L V12	MI	158
18	LMP2	45	(United Kingdom) Embassy Racing	(Brazil) Mario Haberfeld (United Kingdom) Warren Hughes	Embassy WF01	MI	155
18	LMP2	45	(United Kingdom) Embassy Racing	(Brazil) Mario Haberfeld (United Kingdom) Warren Hughes	Zytek ZG348 3.4 L V8	MI	155
19	GT1	73	(France) Luc Alphand Aventures	(France) Sébastien Dumez (France) Jean-Luc Blanchemain (France) Roland Bervillé	Chevrolet Corvette C6.R	MI	155
19	GT1	73	(France) Luc Alphand Aventures	(France) Sébastien Dumez (France) Jean-Luc Blanchemain (France) Roland Bervillé	Chevrolet LS7-R 7.0 L V8	MI	155
20	GT1	55	(Russia) IPB Spartak Racing (Germany) Reiter Engineering	(Netherlands) Peter Kox (Russia) Roman Rusinov	Lamborghini Murciélago R-GT	MI	153
20	GT1	55	(Russia) IPB Spartak Racing (Germany) Reiter Engineering	(Netherlands) Peter Kox (Russia) Roman Rusinov	Lamborghini L535 6.0 L V12	MI	153
21	**GT2**	**91**	**(Germany) Farnbacher Racing**	**(Denmark) Lars-Erik Nielsen (Denmark) Allan Simonsen (United Kingdom) Richard Westbrook**	**Porsche 997 GT3-RSR**	MI	**151**
21	**GT2**	**91**	**(Germany) Farnbacher Racing**	**(Denmark) Lars-Erik Nielsen (Denmark) Allan Simonsen (United Kingdom) Richard Westbrook**	**Porsche 3.8 L Flat-6**	MI	**151**
22	LMP2	33	(Switzerland) Speedy Racing Team (United Kingdom) Sebah Automotive	(Italy) Andrea Belicchi (France) Xavier Pompidou (Switzerland) Steve Zacchia	Lola B08/80	MI	151
22	LMP2	33	(Switzerland) Speedy Racing Team (United Kingdom) Sebah Automotive	(Italy) Andrea Belicchi (France) Xavier Pompidou (Switzerland) Steve Zacchia	Judd DB 3.4 L V8	MI	151
23	GT2	90	(Germany) Farnbacher Racing	(Germany) Pierre Ehret (Germany) Pierre Kaffer	Ferrari F430GT	MI	151
23	GT2	90	(Germany) Farnbacher Racing	(Germany) Pierre Ehret (Germany) Pierre Kaffer	Ferrari 4.0 L V8	MI	151
24	GT2	99	(Monaco) JMB Racing (United Kingdom) Aucott Racing	(France) Stéphane Daoudi (United Kingdom) Ben Aucott	Ferrari F430GT	MI	150
24	GT2	99	(Monaco) JMB Racing (United Kingdom) Aucott Racing	(France) Stéphane Daoudi (United Kingdom) Ben Aucott	Ferrari 4.0 L V8	MI	150
25	GT2	94	(Switzerland) Speedy Racing Team	(Switzerland) Andrea Chiesa (Switzerland) Benjamin Leuenberger	Spyker C8 Laviolette GT2-R	MI	147
25	GT2	94	(Switzerland) Speedy Racing Team	(Switzerland) Andrea Chiesa (Switzerland) Benjamin Leuenberger	Audi 4.0 L V8	MI	147
26	GT2	98	(Monaco) JMB Racing	(Switzerland) Maurice Basso (Italy) Mauro Casadei (Netherlands) Peter Kutemann	Ferrari F430GT	MI	146
26	GT2	98	(Monaco) JMB Racing	(Switzerland) Maurice Basso (Italy) Mauro Casadei (Netherlands) Peter Kutemann	Ferrari 4.0 L V8	MI	146
27	GT2	77	(Germany) Team Felbermayr-Proton	(Germany) Marc Lieb (Australia) Alex Davison	Porsche 997 GT3-RSR	MI	141
27	GT2	77	(Germany) Team Felbermayr-Proton	(Germany) Marc Lieb (Australia) Alex Davison	Porsche 3.8 L Flat-6	MI	141
28	GT2	95	(United Kingdom) James Watt Automotive	(Finland) Markus Palttala (United Kingdom) Tim Sugden (United Kingdom) Paul Daniels	Porsche 997 GT3-RSR	D	135
28	GT2	95	(United Kingdom) James Watt Automotive	(Finland) Markus Palttala (United Kingdom) Tim Sugden (United Kingdom) Paul Daniels	Porsche 3.8 L Flat-6	D	135
29 NC	GT2	85	(Netherlands) Snoras Spyker Squadron	(United Kingdom) Peter Dumbreck (Germany) Ralf Kelleners (Russia) Alexey Vasilyev	Spyker C8 Laviolette GT2-R	MI	149
29 NC	GT2	85	(Netherlands) Snoras Spyker Squadron	(United Kingdom) Peter Dumbreck (Germany) Ralf Kelleners (Russia) Alexey Vasilyev	Audi 4.0 L V8	MI	149
30 DNF	LMP2	46	(United Kingdom) Embassy Racing	(United Kingdom) Jonny Kane (United Kingdom) Joey Foster	Embassy WF01	MI	146
30 DNF	LMP2	46	(United Kingdom) Embassy Racing	(United Kingdom) Jonny Kane (United Kingdom) Joey Foster	Zytek ZG348 3.4 L V8	MI	146
31 DNF	LMP1	4	(France) Saulnier Racing	(France) Jacques Nicolet (Monaco) Marc Faggionato (Monaco) Richard Hein	Pescarolo 01	MI	134
31 DNF	LMP1	4	(France) Saulnier Racing	(France) Jacques Nicolet (Monaco) Marc Faggionato (Monaco) Richard Hein	Judd GV5.5 S2 5.5 L V10	MI	134
32 DNF	LMP1	5	(France) Team Oreca-Matmut	(France) Soheil Ayari (Monaco) Stéphane Ortelli	Courage-Oreca LC70	MI	130
32 DNF	LMP1	5	(France) Team Oreca-Matmut	(France) Soheil Ayari (Monaco) Stéphane Ortelli	Judd GV5.5 S2 5.5 L V10	MI	130
33 DNF	LMP1	16	(France) Pescarolo Sport	(France) Emmanuel Collard (France) Jean-Christophe Boullion	Pescarolo 01	MI	121
33 DNF	LMP1	16	(France) Pescarolo Sport	(France) Emmanuel Collard (France) Jean-Christophe Boullion	Judd GV5.5 S2 5.5 L V10	MI	121
34 DNF	GT2	96	(United Kingdom) Virgo Motorsport	(United Kingdom) Rob Bell (Italy) Gianmaria Bruni	Ferrari F430GT	D	119
34 DNF	GT2	96	(United Kingdom) Virgo Motorsport	(United Kingdom) Rob Bell (Italy) Gianmaria Bruni	Ferrari 4.0 L V8	D	119
35 DNF	LMP2	32	(France) Barazi-Epsilon	(Denmark) Juan Barazi (Netherlands) Michael Vergers (Brazil) Fernando Rees	Zytek 07S/2	MI	116
35 DNF	LMP2	32	(France) Barazi-Epsilon	(Denmark) Juan Barazi (Netherlands) Michael Vergers (Brazil) Fernando Rees	Zytek ZG348 3.4 L V8	MI	116
36 DNF	LMP2	30	(Italy) Racing Box	(Italy) Filippo Francioni (Italy) Marco Didaio	Lucchini LMP2/04	D	115
36 DNF	LMP2	30	(Italy) Racing Box	(Italy) Filippo Francioni (Italy) Marco Didaio	Judd XV675 3.4 L V8	D	115
37 DNF	LMP2	41	(Switzerland) Trading Performance	(Saudi Arabia) Karim Ojjeh (France) Claude-Yves Gosselin (Belgium) Julian Schroyen	Zytek 07S/2	MI	94
37 DNF	LMP2	41	(Switzerland) Trading Performance	(Saudi Arabia) Karim Ojjeh (France) Claude-Yves Gosselin (Belgium) Julian Schroyen	Zytek ZG348 3.4 L V8	MI	94
38 DNF	GT2	75	(France) IMSA Performance Matmut	(France) Richard Balandras (France) Michel Lecourt (France) Jean-Philippe Belloc	Porsche 997 GT3-RSR	MI	86
38 DNF	GT2	75	(France) IMSA Performance Matmut	(France) Richard Balandras (France) Michel Lecourt (France) Jean-Philippe Belloc	Porsche 3.8 L Flat-6	MI	86
39 DNF	LMP1	20	(Spain) Epsilon Euskadi	(Spain) Ángel Burgueño (Spain) Miguel Ángel de Castro	Epsilon Euskadi ee1	MI	73
39 DNF	LMP1	20	(Spain) Epsilon Euskadi	(Spain) Ángel Burgueño (Spain) Miguel Ángel de Castro	Judd GV5.5 S2 5.5 L V10	MI	73
40 DNF	LMP2	37	(France) WR Salini	(France) Stéphane Salini (France) Philippe Salini (France) Patrice Roussel	WR LMP2008	D	71
40 DNF	LMP2	37	(France) WR Salini	(France) Stéphane Salini (France) Philippe Salini (France) Patrice Roussel	Zytek ZG348 3.4 L V8	D	71
41 DNF	LMP1	6	(France) Team Oreca-Matmut	(France) Olivier Panis (France) Nicolas Lapierre	Courage-Oreca LC70	MI	27
41 DNF	LMP1	6	(France) Team Oreca-Matmut	(France) Olivier Panis (France) Nicolas Lapierre	Judd GV5.5 S2 5.5 L V10	MI	27
42 DNF	GT2	88	(Germany) Team Felbermayr-Proton	(Austria) Horst Felbermayr, Sr. (Austria) Horst Felbermayr, Jr. (Germany) Christian Ried	Porsche 997 GT3-RSR	MI	22
42 DNF	GT2	88	(Germany) Team Felbermayr-Proton	(Austria) Horst Felbermayr, Sr. (Austria) Horst Felbermayr, Jr. (Germany) Christian Ried	Porsche 3.8 L Flat-6	MI	22
43 DNF	LMP2	26	(United Kingdom) Team Bruichladdich Radical	(Germany) Jens Petersen (Germany) Jan-Dirk Lueders (France) Marc Rostan	Radical SR9	D	6
43 DNF	LMP2	26	(United Kingdom) Team Bruichladdich Radical	(Germany) Jens Petersen (Germany) Jan-Dirk Lueders (France) Marc Rostan	AER P07 2.0 L Turbo I4	D	6
DSQ^{†}	GT2	76	(France) IMSA Performance Matmut	(France) Raymond Narac (Austria) Richard Lietz	Porsche 997 GT3-RSR	MI	152
DSQ^{†}	GT2	76	(France) IMSA Performance Matmut	(France) Raymond Narac (Austria) Richard Lietz	Porsche 3.8 L Flat-6	MI	152
DNS	LMP1	14	(United Kingdom) Creation Autosportif	(United Kingdom) Jamie Campbell-Walter (United Kingdom) Stuart Hall	Creation CA07	D	-
DNS	LMP1	14	(United Kingdom) Creation Autosportif	(United Kingdom) Jamie Campbell-Walter (United Kingdom) Stuart Hall	AIM (Judd) 5.0 L V10	D	-

† - #76 IMSA Performance Matmut was disqualified after failing post-race technical inspection. The car's airbox was found to be outside the regulations.

== Statistics ==
- Pole Position - #7 Team Peugeot Total - 1:31.470
  - Pole Position (LMP2) - #34 Van Merksteijn Motorsport - 1:36.842
- Fastest Lap - #7 Team Peugeot Total - 1:32.449
- Average Speed - 201.019 km/h

Le Mans Series
Previous race: 2008 1000km of Catalunya	2008 season	Next race: 2008 1000km of Spa
