= William Hill Irish Sports Book of the Year =

- Sponsored by: William Hill plc
- Country: Ireland
- Hosted by: Williamhill.com
- First award: 2006
- Final award: 2011
- Website: Website

The William Hill Irish Sports Book of the Year was an annual Irish literary award sponsored by bookmakers William Hill. Established in 2006, it was related to the International William Hill Sports Book of the Year (est. 1989). The award sought to honour sports books produced in Ireland. The award lost its sponsorship after 2011 and has been discontinued.

== History ==
The inaugural winner of the William Hill Irish Sports Book of the Year in 2006 was Irish footballer Paul McGrath whose autobiography Back from the Brink described his football career and his battle with alcoholism. The following year, Irish rugby union player Trevor Brennan won the award with Heart and Soul, in which Brennan is described as an "anti-hero". The 2008 award was presented to Formula One driver Tommy Byrne for Crashed and Byrned, a biography including his brief five-race career with the now-defunct Hong Kong Theodore team.

Hurler Donal Óg Cusack, the first openly gay elite Irish sportsman, was the 2009 recipient of the William Hill Irish Sports Book of the Year with his autobiography Come What May. Writing about the 2009 season of hurling club side St. Joseph's Doora-Barefield, Christy O'Connor won the 2010 award for The Club.

Winning the 2011 Irish Sports Book of the Year award with his biography of tetraplegic former rugby union player Matt Hampson, Paul Kimmage was the first author to win both the Irish and International awards (1990).

== List of winners ==
- 2006 Back from the Brink, Paul McGrath with Vincent Hogan
- 2007 Heart and Soul, Trevor Brennan with Gerry Thornley
- 2008 Crashed And Byrned: The Greatest Racing Driver You Never Saw, Tommy Byrne with Mark Hughes
- 2009 Come What May: The Autobiography, Donal Óg Cusack
- 2010 The Club by Christy O'Connor
- 2011 Engage: The Fall and Rise of Matt Hampson, Paul Kimmage
