= Warren Hughes =

British racing driver (born 1969)

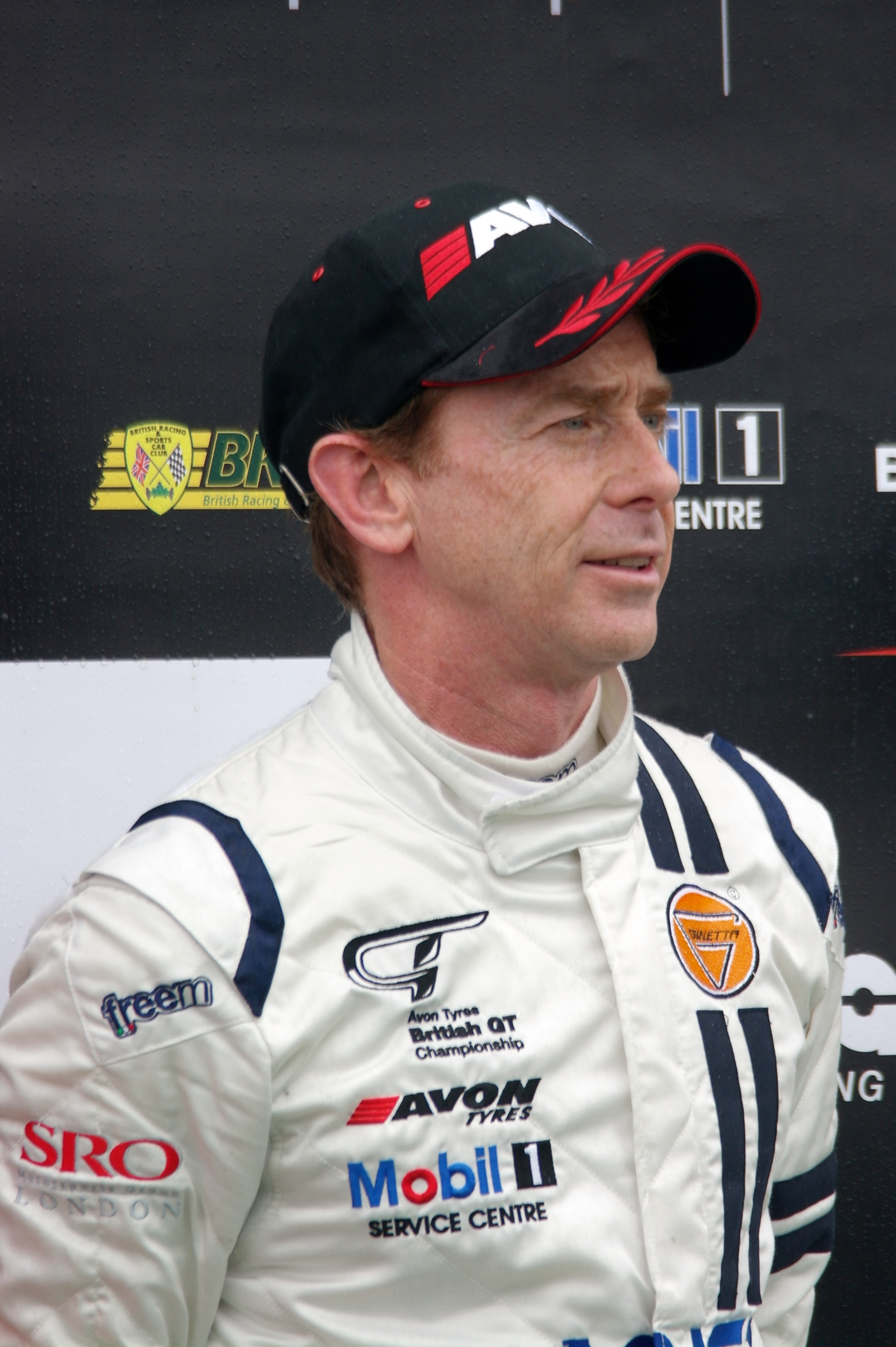
- Hughes as a British GT driver in 2012.
- Nationality: (United Kingdom) British
- Born: 19 January 1969 (age 57) Benwell, Newcastle-upon-Tyne, England
- Relatives: Mark Hughes (brother)

British GT career
- Debut season: 2000
- Current team: Balfe Motorsport, W series
- Categorisation: FIA Platinum (until 2012); FIA Gold (2013–2016); FIA Silver (2017–2022); FIA Bronze (2023–)
- Car number: TBA
- Former teams: M-Sport Racing; Team WFR; LNT; Ian Khan; GruppeM Racing
- Starts: 21
- Wins: 8
- Best finish: 1st in 2012 (GT4 class)

Previous series
- 2012 2011 2011 2010 2010–2011 2005, 2012 2004–2012 2004–2005 2004 2001–2012 2001–2003 2000 1999 1996 1994 1993–1995 1992–1995 1992–1999 1991 1989–1991 1989–1990: FIA WEC; SPEED EuroSeries; ILMC; FLM; FIA GT1; ALMS; ELMS; FIA GT; Carrera Cup GB; 24 Hours of Le Mans; BTCC; Italian Formula 3000; MGF Cup; STW; Formula Three Japan; Macau GP; Masters of Formula 3 British F3; Formula Vauxhall Lotus; Formula Ford Festival; British FF

Championship titles
- 2012 2011 2005 1999 1990: British GT4; SPEED EuroSeries; 24 Hours of Le Mans – LMP2; MGF Cup; British Formula Ford Junior 1600

24 Hours of Le Mans career
- Years: 2001–2002, 2005–2008, 2010–2012
- Teams: MG Sport & Racing Ltd. RML; Chamberlain Synergy Motorsport, Quifel ASM Team; Embassy Racing
- Best finish: 20th (2005, 2010)
- Class wins: 1 (2005)

Warren Hughes (born 19 January 1969) is an English racing driver.

Hughes has raced in a variety of different series, most notably the British Touring Car Championship (BTCC), the FIA GT1 World Championship, the Le Mans Series, the FIA World Endurance Championship and the 24 Hours of Le Mans. He won the LMP2 category of the 24 Hours of Le Mans in 2005, driving for RML Group alongside Tommy Erdos and Mike Newton.

Hughes also tested in F1 for the Lotus and Williams teams during his single seater career.

Having started his career in 1989 in the British Formula Ford Junior 1600 series, and winning the same series the following year, Hughes progressed through various junior single-seater formulae, such as the British Formula 3 Championship and the Formula Three Japan.

Although he briefly switched to touring car racing in 1996, competing in the Super Tourenwagen Cup, and entered the MGF Cup in 1999, winning the series, he did not switch away from single-seater racing fully until 2001, when, having been signed by MG, he entered both the 24 Hours of Le Mans, and the BTCC. He competed in both competitions the following year, and remained in the BTCC in 2003 before leaving MG at the end of that year, after they ended their motorsport programme.

In 2004, he entered part of the British GT Championship, the Porsche Carrera Cup Great Britain, the FIA GT Championship and the Le Mans Series, and entered various events of the latter series up until 2012. During that time, he also competed in events that were part of various other series, notably the American Le Mans Series (in 2005 and 2012) and the FIA GT1 World Championship (in 2010 and 2011).

Having won the SPEED EuroSeries in 2011, he became a regular driver in the British GT Championship in 2012 (in addition to entering in events that were part of the FIA World Endurance Championship), and he won the GT4 category that season, driving with Jody Fannin in a Team WFR-entered Ginetta G50.

Hughes now focuses on race driver coaching but still occasionally races, having finished third in a GT4 McLaren at the 2021 Gulf 12 Hours in Bahrain.

Coaching duties include W Series, working with triple champion Jamie Chadwick, Argenti Motorsport, Double R Racing and Balfe Motosport.

Hughes is also on the roster of McLaren coaches for their worldwide Pure McLaren track programme as well as coaching on the brand's GT Driver Development Programme.

== Racing career ==
=== Early career ===
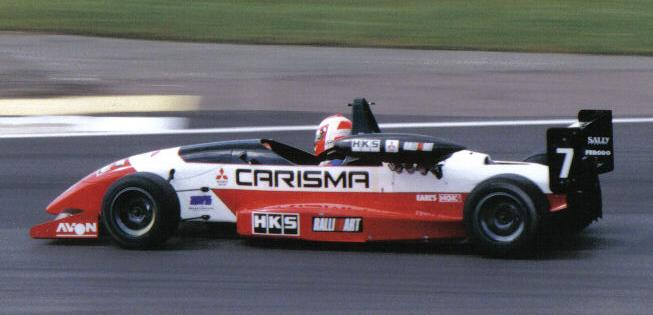
Hughes driving for Alan Docking Racing at Silverstone during the 1995 British Formula 3 Championship season.

Hughes made his car racing debut in 1989, driving in the British Formula Ford Junior 1600, and the Formula Ford Festival, finishing tenth in the latter. His debut in the FF1600, however, was notable for being a third-place finish, ahead of David Coulthard. In addition to entering the Junior FF1600 in 1990, which he won, he would enter the Formula Ford Festival for the next two years, finishing second in 1991. In 1991, he also finished second overall in the Formula Vauxhall Lotus series, driving for Team JLR, having won three races.

For the 1992 British Formula 3 season, Hughes stepped up to the British Formula 3 Championship, finishing seventh whilst driving for Edenbridge Racing, with an eighth place at the Masters of Formula 3. For the following season, he finished fourth in the British F3, driving for Richard Arnold Developments, whilst he also unsuccessfully entered the German Formula Three Championship with RAD, and the Macau Grand Prix with March Engineering. In 1994, he competed in two rounds of the British F3 series (driving one race for March, and one for P1 Engineering), and five of the All-Japan Formula Three Championship (for HKS, in addition to completing a Formula One test for Lotus. He returned to the British F3 full-time in 1995, this time for Alan Docking Racing, and once again finished fourth, with an eleventh place at the Macau Grand Prix (for HKS), and a retirement at the Masters of Formula 3 (for ADR).

The 1996 season saw a brief change of course for Hughes, with five races in the German STW series with Ford, scoring four points, whilst he also tested the Ford Mondeo in the British Touring Car Championship. He returned to the British F3 in 1997 for eight rounds, driving for Piers Portman Racing and remained there in 1998, once again finishing fourth. In 1999, he moved to the MGF Cup, winning seven of the 14 races, and setting 11 fastest laps, to become champion, whilst also competing in two races of the British F3 for Ralt. In 2000, he switched to the Italian Formula 3000 for Arden Team Russia. He was championship runner-up, only missing the podium in 3 races. Hughes also tested for the Williams Formula One team during that year, but was unable to become full-time test driver, with the team opting for Marc Gené instead. He also made his debut in the British GT Championship in 2000, driving for Cirtek Motorsport in a Porsche 911 GT3-R. His first race, the Thruxton Circuit event, where he drove alongside John Cleland, resulted in a fifth-place finish, whilst his second entry, at the Oulton Park round (this time partnering Adam Simmons) saw him fail to finish.

=== 2001–03 ===
In 2001, Hughes became a factory MG driver, with the MG teams being run by West Surrey Racing. His first event for the team came at the 24 Hours of Le Mans of that year, driving alongside Anthony Reid and Jonny Kane in the new MG-Lola EX257. It was not a successful debut for car and driver, however; the car lasted just 30 laps due to an oil pressure issue. Following that event, he drove the MG ZS in the British Touring Car Championship, alongside Reid. The team debuted their new car in the eleventh round of the season, held at Silverstone Circuit, where Hughes retired in race one, but finished fifth in the second race. The team were ineligible for points, due to their late entry, and that fifth-place finish proved to be Hughes' best result of the season, although Reid was able to take a victory at the penultimate race of the season, held at the Brands Hatch Indy circuit, with Hughes taking the team's first pole position for the feature race.

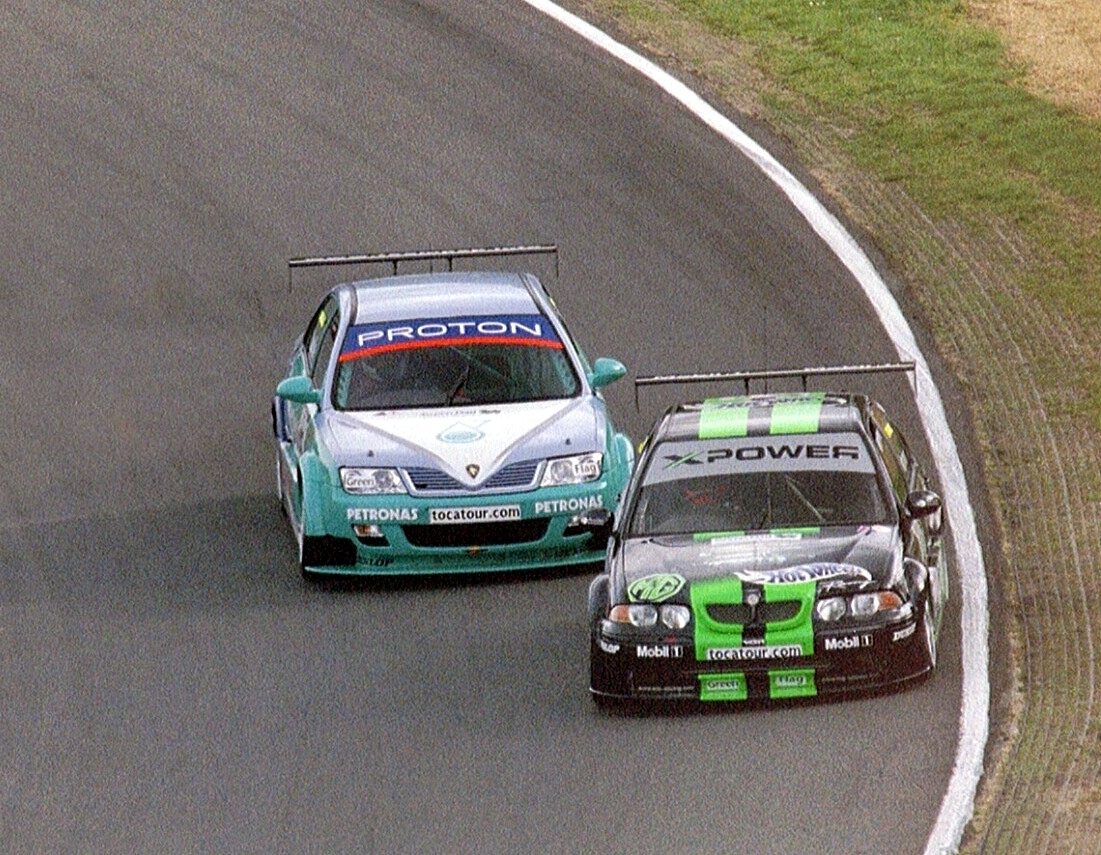
Hughes battling with the Proton entry of David Leslie at Brands Hatch in 2003.

For 2002, MG entered the BTCC from the beginning of the season, with Gareth Howell and Colin Turkington hired for a two-team effort. Although Hughes won two races that year, one more than Reid, he was only able to finish sixth overall, two places behind Reid. None of the MGs were able to consistently match the works Vauxhall Astra Coupes, despite the Astra frequently suffering engine failures. Reid, Hughes and Kane also entered that year's 24 Hours of Le Mans, but once more retired, this time due to gearbox failure after 129 laps.

2003 saw MG slim down to a three-car operation in the BTCC, with no 24 Hours of Le Mans entry, and Howell departed the team. Hughes slipped to seventh, with one win, behind Reid and ahead of Turkington, as the MG drivers finished sixth, seventh, and eighth, all with a win apiece. Following MG's withdrawal at the end of the year, Hughes was forced to leave the team for financial reasons.

=== 2004–2006 ===
Following his departure from the WSR team, 2004 saw Hughes without a regular drive. He entered the British GT Championship for the Oulton Park round, partnering Jonathan Cocker at Gruppe M Racing in an NGT-class Porsche 911 GT3 RSR, finishing sixth in race one, and taking the victory in the second race. He entered the Spa 24 Hours (part of the FIA GT Championship) with the team, partnering Cocker, Tim Sugden and Tim Mullen, but the team failed to finish, with the car's gearbox failing after 301 laps. Following this event, he entered two rounds of the Le Mans Series. The first event was the 1000 km of Silverstone, where Hughes partnered Jonny Kane in a Chamberlain-Synergy Motorsport-entered TVR Tuscan T400R GT, finishing sixth in class; whilst the second race saw Hughes and Kane partner Lawrence Tomlinson in a RSR Racing-entered T400R at the 1000 km of Spa. This would prove to be a less successful race, with Hughes crashing out after just 19 laps.

In 2005, Hughes started his season at the 12 Hours of Sebring, driving the TVR with Kane and Tomlinson, but now under the Team LNT banner, and competing under the new GT2 regulations. It would not prove a successful event; engine failure forced the team to retire both Hughes' car, and their other TVR, driven by Richard Dean, Patrick Pearce and Marc Hynes. He would remain with Team LNT for the remainder of the season. Following the Sebring race, Hughes, now partnered by Pearce, entered the Donington Park round of the 2005 British GT season, finishing second, a race which was followed by a class victory in the 1000 km of Spa, where Hughes was partnered by Kane. Hughes and Pearce then competed in the FIA GT Magny-Cours Supercar 500, finishing 18th overall, and seventh in class – fifth of the drivers who scored points for the British GT Championship. The duo remained together for the Knockhill and Thruxton rounds, with a second place in the first race held at Thruxton being the strongest result out of the four races. Hughes then returned to the 24 Hours of Le Mans for the first time in three years, this time driving for the RML Group team, driving their MG-Lola EX264 alongside Tommy Erdos and Mike Newton. The race proved far more successful than his two previous events, and the trio won the LMP2 category. He returned to Team LNT for the rest of the season, and although the team had entered two cars in the Castle Combe round of the British GT Championship, neither actually competed in a race, following car No.42's exclusion for failing noise limits, and indeed the team withdrew from the remainder of the series for this reason. Following this withdrawal, the team returned to the Le Mans Series, (the 1000 km of Spa, which they had previously entered, was part of this series) resulting in the team having competed in all five events. However, the class victory in Spa would remain their only success, as Hughes, partnered by Kane (and, for the final race, Tomlinson) failed to finish in any of the remaining events, following engine failure at the 1000 km of Monza, throttle issues at both the 1000km of Silverstone and the 1000 km of Istanbul, and suspension failure at the 1000 km of Nürburgring. The solitary victory meant that Hughes and Kane finished 11th in class at the end of the season.

For the first – and to date only – time, Hughes entered the 24 Hours of Daytona in 2006; driving a Cheever Racing-entered Crawford DP03-Lexus alongside Stefan Johansson and Thomas Erdos, and finishing 22nd overall. Hughes remained with Team LNT for that year's Le Mans Series, now driving a GT2-class Panoz Esperante GTLM. The season started poorly, with Hughes, partnered with Robert Bell, retiring from the 1000 km of Istanbul. The 1000 km of Spa proved to be equally unsuccessful, with Hughes retiring once more. Following these two races, Hughes competed in the 24 Hours of Le Mans for Quifel-ASM Team, alongside Miguel Amaral and Miguel Ángel de Castro, driving a Lola B05/40-AER, but once more without success; retiring due to gearbox failure after 196 laps. His first finish of the season, a tenth class placing, came at the 1000 km of Nürburgring, before finishing the season by winning the two remaining events of the season (the 1000 km of Donington and the 1000 km of Jarama). These two victories were enough to allow Hughes and Bell's No.81 Panoz to finish third in the championship, one point and one place behind the No.82 Panoz of fellow Team LNT members Tomlinson and Dean, with Team LNT finishing second, one point behind Autorlando Sport.

=== 2007–2009 ===
For 2007, Hughes moved to Embassy Racing, who were entering a LMP2-class Radical SR9-Judd in the Le Mans Series (the team having initially entered with a Pilbeam MP93.) Despite the move, however, his season started in the same way as the previous one had; with two retirements in the first two rounds for Hughes and his teammate Neil Cunningham. Hughes returned to Team ASM for the 24 Hours of Le Mans, partnering the same drivers as he had in 2006, but once more failed to finish, due to an accident after 137 laps. Returning to the LMS after the 24 Hours of Le Mans, Hughes took fifth place in class at the 1000km of Nürburgring, before finishing sixth in class at the 1000km of Spa, partnered by Darren Manning for the first time. An eighth place at the 1000km of Silverstone was followed by a second place at the final round of the season, the Mil Milhas Brasil, where Manning and Hughes were joined by Mario Haberfield. Hughes finished seventh in class at the end of the season, with Embassy Racing finishing seventh as well.

Hughes remained with Embassy Racing for the 2008 Le Mans Series season, with the team now campaigning their new Embassy WF01-Zytek. The new car had an unsuccessful debut, with Hughes and Haberfield withdrawal from the 1000km of Catalunya, following the sister car's steering failure. Race two would prove to be more successful, with Hughes and Haberfield bringing home their WF01 in eighth position at the 1000km of Monza, although they were 41 laps behind the sister WF01. Kane partnered Hughes for the 1000km of Spa, which once more ended in retirement. Following the Spa event, Embassy Racing entered their first 24 Hours of Le Mans event, with Hughes being partnered with Kane and Joey Foster. Once more, however, luck evaded the Embassy Racing team: various mechanical and electrical maladies blighted the race, before the team were finally forced to retire after Foster was involved in an accident. Hughes and Kane closed the season out with a seventh-place finish at the 1000km of Nürburgring, and a sixth-place finish at the 1000km of Silverstone. The year, however, would end with Embassy Racing closing their doors, due to the economic recession, the first team in the series to be heavily affected by the recession.

As a result of Embassy Racing's closure, and their cars' subsequent sale at an auction, Hughes was left without a drive for 2009. He made one solitary appearance that year, driving in the 1000 km of Silverstone for Team WFR, alongside Jody Firth and Manning in their Zytek 07S/2, which resulted in a fourth-place finish.

=== 2011–2012 ===
In contrast to the quiet 2009 season, 2010 saw Hughes entering several different series. His season started with a retirement at the 8 Hours of Castellet, part of the LMS, driving for Quifel-ASM in a Ginetta-Zytek GZ09S/2 alongside Amaral and Olivier Pla. The next three races Hughes contested were all part of the FIA GT1 World Championship, driving Sumo Power GT's Nissan GT-R with Jamie Campbell-Walter, with the best result of those races being a victory at the RAC Tourist Trophy, held at Silverstone. Following these three events, he returned to the Quifel-ASM team for the 24 Hours of Le Mans, alongside Amaral and Pla. For the first time since his victory in 2005, Hughes was able to finish the race, taking seventh in class and 20th overall, although the race was by no means trouble free, due to an accident and a driveshaft failure. Following this event, Hughes returned to the GT1 championship with Sumo Power GT, at the Paul Ricard round, finishing eighth. He then returned to the LMS for the 1000 km of Algarve, this time driving a DAMS-entered Oreca FLM 09 alongside Firth, and finishing sixth overall, taking the Formula Le Mans class win. His next four events were split across the LMS and the GT1 series, with both GT1 entries being for Sumo Power GT, whilst he entered one event for RLR msport (in their MG EX265) and one for DAMS, with his best overall finish out of the four races coming at the Nürburgring round, where he and Campbell-Walter finished eighth, whilst his final LMS race of the season, the 1000 km of Silverstone, saw a 14th place overall, with a class win for Hughes and Firth. Following that race, he competed in the five remaining GT1 rounds for Sumo Power GT, with third at the Navarra round proving to be his best result out of those races. At the end of the season, Hughes and Campbell-Walter were classified 12th in the GT1 championship, whilst Hughes was also classified 12th in the FLM category of the LMS.

2011 saw Hughes rejoin Team WFR, but this time driving alongside Firth in the new SPEED Euroseries, with the team entering their own WFR WF03-Mugen. It proved a successful venture from the start, with Hughes and Firth winning the first race, and finishing in second in the second race, of the season opener at Paul Ricard. The season finished with Hughes and Firth being crowned champions, beating nearest rival Dean Stirling by three points, having won three races, and taken eight podiums. During the SPEED Euroseries season, he stood in for Ricardo Zonta at Sumo Power GT for two rounds of the FIA GT1 World Championship, partnering Enrique Bernoldi, and finishing fourth and seventh in his two events. Following those two races, Hughes drove for Quifel-ASM at the 2011 24 Hours of Le Mans, driving the now-LMP1 class Zytek 09SC (an evolution of the Ginetta-Zytek used the previous year). Once more, however, he was forced to retire, with the team only able to last for 48 laps before engine failure struck. He also competed in the 6 Hours of Silverstone and 6 Hours of Estoril for RLR Msport, driving their MG EX265 alongside Rob Garofall and Barry Gates, taking fifth in class at both races, resulting in Hughes being classified 16th in the LMP2 category for 2011.

For 2012, Hughes signed for Murphy Prototypes, driving their Oreca 03-Nissan alongside Firth and Brendon Hartley in the 24 Hours of Le Mans, and Firth in the European Le Mans Series. His ELMS debut came at the 6 Hours of Castellet, but it would not be a successful one, with the car catching fire during the event. Once more in the Le Mans event, however, mechanical maladies struck, with suspension failure after 196 laps forcing the team to retire from a strong position. A podium at the 6 Hours of Donington, however, would prove to be the team's only point-scoring finish of the season, as the team once more failed to finish at the Petit Le Mans, following an electronics failure after 330 laps. In addition to his ELMS and 24 Hours of Le Mans entries, Hughes returned to the British GT Championship with Team WFR in the Ginetta G50 GT4, being partnered by Jody Fannin. The pairing dominated the GT4 category, winning eight of their ten races on the way to the title, and finishing 84.25 points ahead of nearest rival Zoë Wenham.

=== 2013–present ===
Hughes was included on the official Le Mans Prototype (LMP) reserve list for the 2013 24 Hours of Le Mans, driving a Lola B12/80-Judd entered by HVM Status GP. However, the team withdrew from the event, leaving Hughes without a drive. He remained in the British GT Championship, but moved up to the GT3 category, driving M-Sport Racing's Audi R8 LMS alongside Rembert Berg. The team's GT racing debut, at Rockingham, proved successful, with Hughes and Berg taking a second-place finish. Silverstone proved to be less successful, as the duo finished eleventh. Snetterton was a mixed weekend, as they came second in race one, and tenth in race two. In August, Berg and Hughes announced that they would be competing for Team WRT for the rest of the season, in a GT3-class Audi R8 LMS ultra.

== Driver coaching ==
Hughes also has been employed as a driver coach for British Formula 3 team Hitech Racing and former BTCC driver Harry Vaulkhard.

== Racing record ==
=== Super Tourenwagen Cup results ===
(key) (Races in bold indicate pole position) (Races in italics indicate fastest lap)

Year	Team	Car	1	2	3	4	5	6	7	8	9	10	11	12	13	14	15	16	17	18	DC	Pts
1996	Ford Mondeo Team Schübel	Ford Mondeo Ghia	ZOL; 1	ZOL; 2	ASS; 1	ASS; 2	HOC; 1; 19	HOC; 2 Ret	SAC; 1	SAC; 2	WUN; 1	WUN; 2	ZWE; 1 Ret	ZWE; 2 Ret	SAL; 1	SAL; 2	AVU; 1	AVU; 2	NÜR; 1; 26	NÜR; 2; 22	**35th**	**4**

=== Italian Formula 3000 results ===
(key) Races in bold indicate pole position) Races in italics indicate fastest lap)

Year	Team	1	2	3	4	5	6	7	8	Pos	Pts
2000	Arden Team Russia	VAL; 3	MUG; 8	**IMO**; 1	MON; 1	VAL; Ret	DON; 2	PER; 6	MIS; 2	**2nd**	**37**

=== British Touring Car Championship results ===
(key) Races in bold indicate pole position (1 point awarded – 2001–2002 all races, 2003 just for first race) Races in italics indicate fastest lap (1 point awarded all races) * signifies that driver lead race for at least one lap (1 point given – 2001–2002 just for feature race, 2003 all races)

Year	Team	Car	Class	1	2	3	4	5	6	7	8	9	10	11	12	13	14	15	16	17	18	19	20	21	22	23	24	25	26	Pen.	Pos	Pts
2001	MG Sport & Racing	MG ZS	T	BRH; 1	BRH; 2	THR; 1	THR; 2	OUL; 1	OUL; 2	SIL; 1	SIL; 2	MON; 1	MON; 2	DON; 1	DON; 2	KNO; 1	KNO; 2	SNE; 1	SNE; 2	CRO; 1	CRO; 2	OUL; 1	OUL; 2	SIL; 1 Ret	SIL; 2 ovr:5 cls:5	DON; 1 ovr:11 cls:5	DON; 2 ovr:8 cls:6	BRH; 1 Ret	**BRH**; **2** Ret		NC†	0†
2002	MG Sport & Racing	MG ZS	T	BRH; 1 Ret	BRH; 2 ovr:8* cls:8	OUL; 1 ovr:2 cls:2	OUL; 2 ovr:2 cls:2	THR; 1 ovr:11 cls:11	THR; 2 ovr:10 cls:10	SIL; 1 ovr:1 cls:1	SIL; 2 ovr:11 cls:11	MON; 1 ovr:10 cls:10	MON; 2 ovr:7 cls:7	CRO; 1 ovr:5 cls:5	CRO; 2 ovr:11 cls:11	SNE; 1 ovr:7 cls:7	SNE; 2 ovr:3 cls:3	KNO; 1 Ret	KNO; 2 Ret	BRH; 1 ovr:2 cls:2	**BRH**; **2** ovr:1* cls:1	DON; 1 ovr:7 cls:7	DON; 2 ovr:2* cls:2							-5	6th	110
2003	MG Sport & Racing	MG ZS	T	MON; 1 ovr:4 cls:4	MON; 2 Ret	BRH; 1 Ret*	BRH; 2 ovr:5* cls:5	THR; 1 Ret	THR; 2 ovr:6 cls:6	SIL; 1 Ret	SIL; 2 ovr:3 cls:3	ROC; 1 ovr:8* cls:8	ROC; 2 ovr:3 cls:3	CRO; 1 Ret	CRO; 2 ovr:10 cls:10	SNE; 1 Ret	SNE; 2 ovr:8 cls:8	BRH; 1 ovr:1* cls:1	**BRH**; **2** ovr:6* cls:6	DON; 1 ovr:4 cls:4	DON; 2 ovr:7 cls:7	OUL; 1 ovr:4 cls:4	OUL; 2 ovr:8 cls:8								7th	98

† Not eligible for points.

=== FIA GT1 World Championship results ===
(key) Races in bold indicate pole position) Races in italics indicate fastest lap)

Year	Team	Car	1	2	3	4	5	6	7	8	9	10	11	12	13	14	15	16	17	18	19	20	Pos	Pts
2010	Sumo Power GT	Nissan GT-R GT1	ABU; 1; 13	ABU; 2; 12	SIL; 1; 5	SIL; 2; 1	BRN; 1; 21	BRN; 2; 17	PRI; 1; 3	PRI; 2; 8	SPA; 1; 19	SPA; 2; 11	NÜR; 1; 16	NÜR; 2; 8	ALG; 1; 9	ALG; 2 Ret	NAV; 1; 5	NAV; 2; 3	INT; 1; 14	INT; 2 Ret	SAN; 1; 13	SAN; 2; 16	**16th**	**52**
2011	Sumo Power GT	Nissan GT-R GT1	ABU; 1	ABU; 2	ZOL; 1	ZOL; 2	ALG; 1	ALG; 2	SAC; 1; 4	SAC; 2; 4	SIL; 1; 4	SIL; 2; 7	NAV; 1	NAV; 2	PRI; 1	PRI; 2	ORD; 1	ORD; 2	BEI; 1	BEI; 2	SAN; 1	SAN; 2	**18th**	**24**

=== British GT Championship results ===
(key) (Races in bold indicate pole position in class) (Races in italics indicate fastest lap in class)

Year	Team	Car	Class	1	2	3	4	5	6	7	8	9	10	11	12	13	14	15	16	17	18	DC	Pts
2000	Cirtek Motorsport	Porsche 996 GT3-R	GTO	THR; 1; 5	CRO; 1	OUL; 1 Ret	DON; 1	SIL; 1	BRH; 1	DON; 1	CRO; 1	SIL; 1	SNE; 1	SPA; 1	SIL; 1							25th	12
2004	Gruppe M Racing	Porsche 911 GT3 RSR	NGT	DON; 1	DON; 2	MON; 1	MON; 2	SNE; 1	SNE; 2	CAS; 1	CAS; 2	OUL; 1; 6	OUL; 2; **1**	SIL; 1	SIL; 2	THR; 1	THR; 2	BRH; 1	BRH; 2			**17th**	**13**
2005	Team LNT	TVR Tuscan T400R	GT2	DON; 1; 2	DON; 2	MAG; 1; 5	MAG; 2	CRO; 1	CRO; 2	KNO; 1; 6	KNO; 2	THR; 1; 2	THR; 2	CAS; 1	CAS; 2	SIL; 1	SIL; 2	MON; 1	MON; 2	SIL; 3	SIL; 4	**8th**	**23**
2012	Team WFR	Ginetta G50	GT4	OUL; 1; 17	OUL; 2; 19	NÜR; 1; 17	**NÜR**; **2** Ret	**ROC**; 16	BRH; 12	**SNE**; **1**; 19	SNE; 2; 11	**SIL**; 18	DON; 14									**1st**	**243.25**
2013	M-Sport Racing	Audi R8 LMS	GT3	OUL; 1	OUL; 2	ROC; 2	SIL; 11	SNE; 1; 3	SNE; 2; 10	BRH	ZAN; 1	ZAN; 2	DON									**8th***	**46***

^{*} Season still in progress.

=== 24 Hours of Le Mans results ===
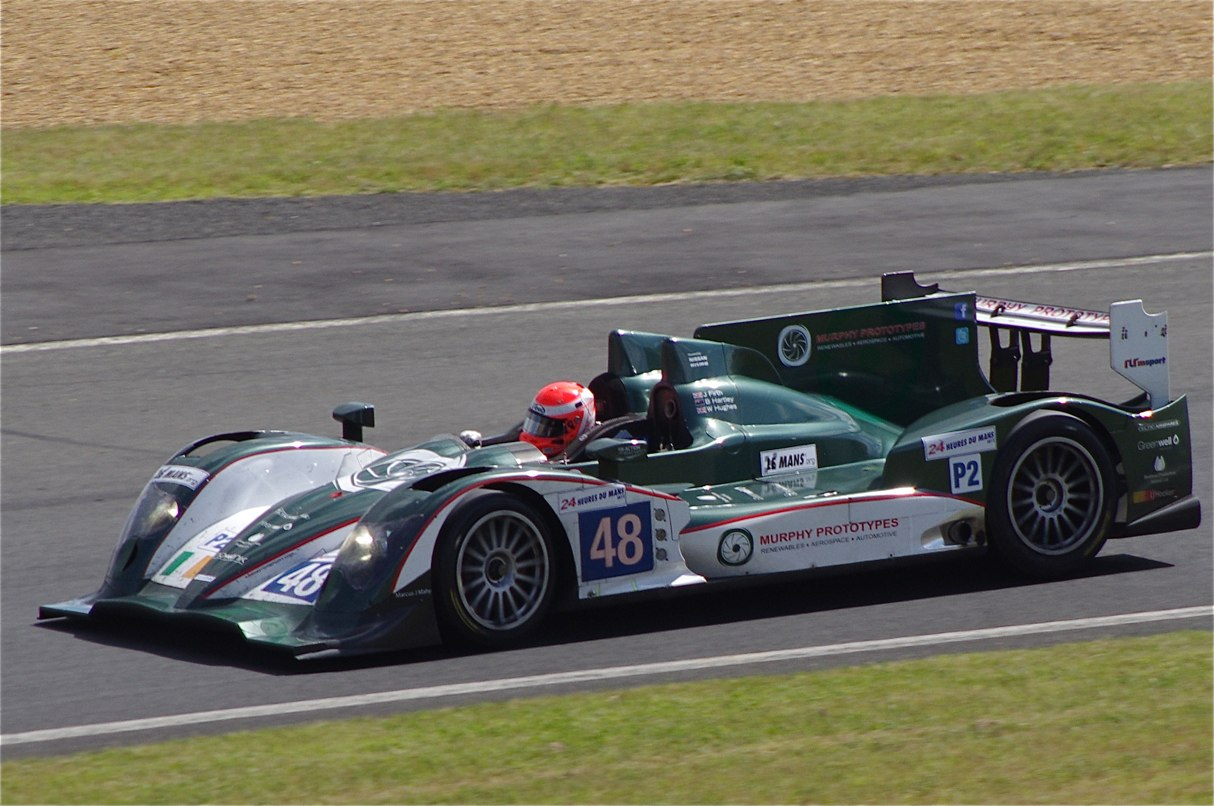
Warren Hughes, Le Mans 24 Hours, 2012

Year	Team	Co-Drivers	Car	Class	Laps	Pos.	Class Pos.
2001	(United Kingdom) MG Sport & Racing Ltd.	(United Kingdom) Anthony Reid (United Kingdom) Jonny Kane	MG-Lola EX257	LMP675	30	DNF	DNF
2002	(United Kingdom) MG Sport & Racing Ltd.	(United Kingdom) Anthony Reid (United Kingdom) Jonny Kane	MG-Lola EX257	LMP675	129	DNF	DNF
2005	(United Kingdom) RML	(Brazil) Thomas Erdos (United Kingdom) Mike Newton	MG-Lola EX264-Judd	LMP2	305	20th	**1st**
2006	(United Kingdom) Chamberlain-Synergy Motorsport; ASM Team Racing for Portugal	(Portugal) Miguel Amaral (Spain) Miguel Ángel de Castro	Lola B05/40-AER	LMP2	196	DNF	DNF
2007	Quifel ASM Team Racing for Portugal	(Portugal) Miguel Amaral (Spain) Miguel Ángel de Castro	Lola B05/40-AER	LMP2	137	DNF	DNF
2008	(United Kingdom) Embassy Racing	(United Kingdom) Jonny Kane (United Kingdom) Joey Foster	Embassy WF01-Zytek	LMP2	213	DNF	DNF
2010	(Portugal) Quifel ASM Team	(Portugal) Miguel Amaral (France) Olivier Pla	Ginetta-Zytek GZ09S/2	LMP2	318	20th	7th
2011	(Portugal) Quifel ASM Team	(Portugal) Miguel Amaral (France) Olivier Pla	Zytek 09SC	LMP1	48	DNF	DNF
2012	(Republic of Ireland) Murphy Prototypes	(United Kingdom) Jody Firth (New Zealand) Brendon Hartley	Oreca 03-Nissan	LMP2	196	DNF	DNF

=== GT Cup Championship results ===
(key) (Races in bold indicate pole position in class – 1 point awarded just in first race; races in italics indicate fastest lap in class – 1 point awarded all races;-

Year	Team	Car	Class	1	2	3	4	5	6	7	8	9	10	11	12	13	14	15	16	17	18	19	20	DC	CP	Points
2020	Balfe Motorsport	McLaren 570S GT4	GTH	SNE; 1	SNE; 2	SNE; 3	SNE; 4	SIL; 1; 13	SIL; 2; 5	SIL; 3; 5	SIL; 4; 4	DON1; 1	DON1; 2	DON1; 3	DON1; 4	BRH; 1	BRH; 2	BRH; 3	BRH; 4	DON2; 1	DON2; 2	DON2; 3	DON2; 4	NC†	NC†	0†

† Hughes was ineligible for points as he was an invitation entry.
