= Mark Hughes (journalist) =

British journalist

- Born: Mark Peter Hughes
- Occupations: Motorsport journalist, Author
- Known for: Grand Prix editor: Motor Sport magazine

Mark Peter Hughes is a British journalist who has been the Grand Prix editor for Motor Sport magazine since 2014. He is also a Formula One correspondent for The Sunday Times and technical editor for the renowned motor racing annual Autocourse. Hughes also provides analysis for British television coverage of Formula One, working in the role of technical analyst for Sky Sports, following his previous role as commentary box producer for the BBC's coverage, in case commentators David Coulthard and Martin Brundle miss anything on track. He worked in a similar role for ITV when they had the rights to Formula One, assisting Brundle and James Allen. He has also written articles that have been published in The Daily Telegraph.

When Hughes worked for Autosport, his Formula One race reports were widely acclaimed for their combination of cockpit insight, technical understanding, and vivid prose; veteran motorsport author Eoin Young has described Hughes as "a talent with an amazing ... ability", and has compared him to Ernest Hemingway. Hughes has had several Formula One-related books published. Speed Addicts (published by HarperCollins) was awarded Best Illustrated Book at the 2006 British Sports Book Awards. Hughes is also the author of the 2008 book Lewis Hamilton, The Full Story. His co-authored book with racing driver Tommy Byrne, Crashed And Byrned, won the 2008 William Hill Irish Sports Book of the Year. His brother is the racing driver Warren Hughes, and he is married. Hughes scaled back his workload following the 2025 Formula One season and would only work part time from 2026 onwards.
