= Matt Hampson =

English rugby union player

Matt Hampson OBE
- Born: Matthew Hampson; 29 November 1984 (age 41); England
- Occupation: Rugby union prop
- Known for: being the victim of a scrummaging incident
- Website: Matt Hampson Foundation

Matthew "Hambo" Hampson OBE (born 29 November 1984) is an English former rugby union prop who became paralysed from the neck down (C4/5 tetraplegic), after a scrummaging accident when practising with England under-21 squad in March 2005. His condition requires permanent use of a ventilator to breathe.

Hampson took up rugby as a 5-year old for Oakham, joining Syston RFC when he was 12. He joined Leicester Tigers academy at the under 16 age group and was made an apprentice for the 2001/2 season. He was regarded as a promising prop and although he had not made his Leicester debut he had been an unused bench replacement. He had played both for Bedford Blues and Nuneaton R.F.C. while on loan. He had also played for England U18 and England U21.

== Training accident ==
Hampson's accident happened on 15 March 2005 at Franklin's Gardens, when the England U21 team were preparing for an under 21 Six Nations match against Scotland. In what he described as a freak accident, a scrum collapsed and dislocated his neck, severing his spinal cord. Referee and former paramedic Tony Spreadbury was praised for his quick reaction to stabilise Hampson's neck, saving him even further damage that could have resulted in his death.

Hampson was taken first to Northampton General Hospital and then to the specialist spine unit at Stoke Mandeville Hospital, where he had an operation to relocate his spine. He spent 18 months in Stoke Mandeville, where he contracted a life-threatening Clostridioides difficile infection.

== Charitable work ==
Hampson divides his time between raising money for spinal care both for himself and others, and UK charity Spinal Research, coaching youngsters at Oakham School, physiotherapy sessions and has written columns for Rugby World magazine, The Leicester Mercury and International Rugby News. He has been supported by former England U21 captain Matt Cornwell.

In 2011 the Matt Hampson trust gained full charity status and became the Matt Hampson Foundation. Matt works with the foundation to provide advice, support and relief for anyone suffering serious injury or disability which has arisen from any cause, but in particular from participation in or training for any sport, sporting activity or other form of physical education or recreation. Matt regularly visits beneficiaries, schools and societies where he gives advice and motivational talks taken from his own experiences.

Hampson was appointed Officer of the Order of the British Empire (OBE) in the 2021 New Year Honours for voluntary and charitable service, and received his award from the Princess Anne in a ceremony at Windsor Castle in February 2022.

== Get Busy Living Centre ==
Hampson's ambition was to create a dedicated physical rehabilitation centre for sufferers of serious injuries through sports-accidents, resulting in life-changing conditions with long-term effects including permanent disability, to help them to recover to the best of their abilities. An upstairs gym area has therapy space and equipment, with ground-level refreshments and a community space for participants to spend time with their families and to share experiences. A garden area provides a social space outdoors.

Work started in November 2016 on the site of an old aircraft hangar in countryside at Burrough on the Hill, near Melton Mowbray, Leicestershire, England, and the new facility was opened officially on 2 October 2018. Long-term plans are for more Get Busy Living Centres elsewhere in England, and possibly another abroad.

Two wheelchair-accessible lodges at the centre were completed in 2022, providing self-contained accommodation for newly injured competitors and their families or carers.

== Publication ==
A biography, written by Paul Kimmage with much of it in autobiographical form, was published in 2011, entitled Engage: The Fall and Rise of Matt Hampson. It was shortlisted for the 2011 William Hill Sports Book of the Year, despite not being longlisted. It was however awarded the 2011 William Hill Irish Sports Book of the Year. It was subsequently awarded the "Autobiography/Biography" category of the 2012 British Sports Book Awards and went on to win the "Best Overall" award. The book is highly critical of the standards of care he initially received from the National Health Service, and the attitude of the RFU, which contrasts with that of the Leicester Tigers board.
