= Paul Kimmage =

Irish sports journalist and former cyclist (born 1962)

Personal information
- Full name: Paul Kimmage
- Born: 7 May 1962 (age 64) Dublin, Ireland

Cycling career
- Sport: Cycling
- Discipline: Road
- Role: Retired

Amateur teams
- 1980–1983: Tara Road CC
- 1984: ACBB (France)
- 1985: CC Wasquehal (Belgium)

Professional teams
- 1986–1987: RMO
- 1988–1989: Fagor–MBK

Major wins
- National Road Race Champion (1981)

Paul Kimmage (born 7 May 1962) is an Irish sports journalist and former amateur and professional road bicycle racer, who was road race champion of Ireland in 1981, and competed in the 1984 Olympic Games. He wrote for The Sunday Times newspaper and others, and published a number of books.

Kimmage was born into a cycling family. His father, Christy, cycled with the Dublin Wheelers, and his brothers Raphael and Kevin were also active. At schoolboy level (under 16) he and his brothers rode with the Orwell Wheelers, at the same time as Stephen Roche.

== Cycling career ==
=== Amateur career ===
Kimmage had a prominent career as an amateur, notably his 6th place at the amateur world road race championship. His brothers also enjoyed the spotlight: Raphael finished second in the 1984 Rás Tailteann, while Kevin won the race in 1991.

Kimmage replicated his reputation as a successful amateur in Ireland, for the French ACBB team and the Belgian CC Wasquehal amateur team. He also represented his country at the 1984 Summer Olympics in Los Angeles, in the team time trials, where the team placed 16th of 26.

Notable performances as an amateur included 5 July 1981 where he became the national road race champion ahead of the old but still competitive Paddy Flanagan. He was sixth in the 1985 amateur world road championship. He also finished ninth in a professional race, the Bordeaux–Paris, behind Belgian René Martens, in 1985.

=== Professional career, 1986–1989 ===
In 1986 Kimmage joined the RMO team under Bernard Thévenet. During his time in the peloton he wrote pieces in Irish newspapers interested in the sport because of the success of countrymen Stephen Roche and Sean Kelly.

His career includes ninth on stage 7 of the 1986 Tour de France before completing the Tour in 131st place (his only finish in three participations of the Tour). He was in the Irish team with Stephen Roche, Sean Kelly and Martin Earley that prepared together and competed at the UCI Road World Championships in 1987 that ended with a win by Stephen Roche. Several weeks later during the 1987 Nissan Classic in which Kimmage finished eighth, Kelly thanked Roche, Earley and Kimmage for closing the gap to a break and ensuring his yellow jersey.

Kimmage left RMO at the end of 1988 and rode for half a season for the Fagor–MBK team of Stephen Roche and Eddy Schepers with directeur sportif Patrick Valcke. He supported Roche in the 1989 Giro d'Italia which was won by Laurent Fignon with Roche finishing ninth. Kimmage was planning on ending his professional cycling career at the end of the 1989 Nissan Classic which ended each year on O'Connell Street in Dublin but after Roche had to withdraw from the 1989 Tour de France, Kimmage withdrew and subsequently gave up as a professional.

==== Controversy ====
Kimmage always struggled with injury and he retired with no wins, blaming systemic doping in the peloton. In his book Rough Ride he talks of taking amphetamines in a post-season exhibition race, something that was common practice at that time in cycling; criterium results were often staged, with a win being guaranteed for the biggest name or local hero.

== Journalism and publishing ==
=== Books ===
In May 1990, Kimmage published Rough Ride, detailing his experiences as a domestique which included references to drug use, including his own. Kimmage admitted to using amphetamines to ride non-controlled criteriums on a few occasions, and caffeine suppositories, but says he stayed away from more powerful and dangerous drugs that other cyclists were using.

Kimmage wrote a biography of Matt Hampson entitled Engage: The Fall and Rise of Matt Hampson. It was published in August 2011. It won the 2012 British Sports Book Award in the Autobiography/Biography category, and went on to win the overall best book award in all categories. It was shortlisted for the 2011 William Hill Sports Book of the Year, despite not being longlisted. It was however awarded the 2011 William Hill Irish Sports Book of the Year.

=== Press ===
Kimmage had been a sports journalist with the Sunday Independent in Ireland. He left for The Sunday Times soon after an incident in 2002, when the newspaper misrepresented an article he had written about Roy Keane in the wake of the Saipan saga involving Keane. The editors had taken a quote from Keane out of context to run a headline that implied Keane was planning to leave his wife.

Kimmage has been a long-time friend of David Walsh, author of the controversial doping-in-cycling book L.A. Confidentiel.

In 2012 Kimmage was laid off from The Sunday Times. He has claimed that the loss of his job is related to his reporting on doping in cycling. Because many of his doping and cycling stories were rejected by the paper's lawyers, he was unable to get as many published articles as he otherwise would have, and this led to his losing his job.

Kimmage has also described his difficulty with being dispassionate on the issue. He told Today FM "sometimes I let myself down" while covering the topic, relating his passion to his own experience in the sport and the knowledge that other riders have died from doping.

In 2012 Kimmage was named among the top 10 most influential sportswriters in Britain by the trade publication, UK Press Gazette.

=== Documentary ===
In July 2014, a documentary film called Rough Rider was shown. The documentary was filmed over two years and was set against the fall of Lance Armstrong for doping offences and followed Kimmage as a journalist during the 2013 Tour de France where he questions what is being done to remove the doping culture in professional cycling.

=== Radio ===
Kimmage is a panelist on the Newstalk 106 Sunday Sports radio show and a regular contributor to The Last Word on Today FM.

== Doping-related controversies ==
=== Lance Armstrong ===
Kimmage has a history of confrontations with former professional cyclist Lance Armstrong. Kimmage has invoked the ire of Armstrong over claims that most of Armstrong's early US Postal cycling team were doped, claiming that riders like George Hincapie had taken performance-enhancing drugs.

This conflict received widespread coverage before the 2009 Tour of California, when Kimmage asked Armstrong a question regarding dopers. Upon learning the identity of Kimmage, who had earlier referred to Armstrong as the "cancer" of cycling, Armstrong responded aggressively to the question, with the heated exchange being uploaded to popular video sharing sites. In June 2012, the US Anti-Doping Agency (USADA) charged Armstrong with having used illicit performance-enhancing drugs, and in August they announced a lifetime ban from competition as well as the stripping of all titles since August 1998. On 22 October 2012, the Union Cycliste Internationale (UCI), the sport's governing body, endorsed USADA's verdict and confirmed both the lifetime ban and the stripping of titles. These included the Tour de France titles for the years 1999 to 2005.

=== Floyd Landis interview ===
In January 2011, nyvelocity.com published the full transcript of a 7-hour interview Paul Kimmage conducted with former professional cyclist Floyd Landis a few days before Thanksgiving of 2010. In the interview, Landis admitted to being involved in doping activities during his time with the US Postal team, where he was often referred to as Lance Armstrong's "second in command".

=== UCI defamation suit and counter-suit ===
In 2012 Union Cycliste Internationale president Pat McQuaid and former president Hein Verbruggen, as well as UCI itself, sued Kimmage in Switzerland for defamation. Press attributed this to articles Kimmage had written for The Sunday Times and L'Équipe which discussed doping and UCI. Greg LeMond, Tyler Hamilton, David Walsh, and others voiced their support for Kimmage and a legal defence fund was set up to assist him. The lawsuit was later dropped, but Kimmage had received money from the public to prepare a defence, so he decided to sue the UCI himself in a criminal court. He stated that he was doing it for the whistleblowers who were defamed by the UCI. UCI withdrew its suit fully, and McQuaid allowed his to rest, but Verbruggen pursued his, and secured a win, with Kimmage required to publish apologies, not repeat certain allegations, and pay 12000 euro compensation. The complaint he filed was dismissed by Swiss authorities.

== Major results ==
1981
1st Road race, National Amateur Road Championships
1983
2nd Manx International
1984
1st Road race, National Amateur Road Championships
1985
6th Road race, UCI Road World Amateur Championships
9th Bordeaux–Paris
1986
2nd Tom Sheehan Memorial
1987
8th Overall Nissan Classic

Awards
Preceded by Dan Topolski & Patrick Robinson	William Hill Sports Book of the Year winner 1990	Succeeded by Thomas Hauser
