= Rough Rider (film) =

2014 Irish documentary television film

- Genre: Documentary
- Country of origin: Ireland
- Original language: English

Production
- Producers: Martha O’Neill and Tony Whelan
- Cinematography: Ronan Fox and Richard Kendrick
- Running time: 90 minutes
- Production company: Wildfire Films/Ergo Films

Original release
- Network: RTÉ 1
- Release: 28 July 2014

Rough Rider is a documentary film, first shown on RTÉ television on 28 July 2014. Filmed over two years, it is set against the fall of Lance Armstrong for doping offences in 2012 and follows the Irish journalist and former professional cyclist Paul Kimmage during the 2013 Tour de France, where he questions what is being done to free professional cycling from doping since the release in 1990 of his book Rough Ride. The film is directed by Adrian McCarthy.
