= Rough Ride (book) =

1990 book by Paul Kimmage

- Author: Paul Kimmage
- Language: English
- Subject: Cycling
- Genre: Autobiography
- Publisher: Yellow Jersey Press
- Publication date: 1998
- Pages: 312
- ISBN: 978-0-224-08017-0 (Paperback)

Rough Ride is a William Hill Sports Book of the Year, written by Irish journalist Paul Kimmage in 1990.

It is an autobiography that charts the author's upbringing in Dublin and his obsession with road cycling, which started with his father being a top-level Irish amateur. Paul Kimmage was Irish junior champion before riding for an amateur squad in Paris and becoming a professional with a French team, RMO, in 1986. He rode the Tour de France in 1986, 1987, and 1989. His book tells of his disappointing experiences as a professional and he claims widespread use of performance-enhancing drugs. His claims led to ostracism by his peers.
