= Embassy Racing =

(United Kingdom) Embassy Racing
- Founded: 2003
- Folded: 2009
- Team principal(s): Jonathan France
- Former series: British GT Championship; Le Mans Series; British Supersport Championship; British Superstock 600 Championship
- Noted drivers: (United Kingdom) Warren Hughes (United Kingdom) Jody Firth (United Kingdom) Darren Manning

Embassy Racing was a British auto racing team founded by Jonathan France in 2003. Initially created as a conjunction with Xero Competition in the British GT Championship, the team expanded to become an independent team and began to win races in British GT before the team took a sabbatical year in 2006. Upon their return to motorsport, Embassy moved to the international Le Mans Series, running in a Le Mans Prototype class, as well as entering the British Superbike Championship's junior leagues, the Supersport and Superstock Championships, running with the support of Triumph Motorcycles under the MAP Embassy Triumph banner.

In 2008, Embassy became a race car constructor for the first time, when they developed and built a new Le Mans Prototype known as the WF01. Embassy Racing ran two WF01s in the Le Mans Series, two Triumph Daytona 675s in the British Supersport Championship, and another Daytona in Superstock.

At the end of the 2008 season Jonathan France declared that he planned to ‘mothball’ the team due to the economic climate. Then in March 2009 it was announced that the entire assets of the team were to be sold via an on-line auction.

== Team history ==
=== British GT ===
When Embassy Racing was first founded by France in 2003, the team initially served as a marketing brand, racing under their own banner but serving as the public face for a second team under the management of Xero Competition. Entered in the British GT Championship, Xero and Embassy ran Chevrolet Corvette C5s in the series' top category with drivers Paula Cook and New Zealander Neil Cunningham.

Embassy's Corvette started the season with good results, outperforming the other Xero Corvette, but by mid-season the team had difficulty finishing races due to accidents and mechanical problems. The team rebounded and were able to score their first podium finish at race two at the Thruxton Circuit, aided by Ben Collins replacing Paula Cook. By season's end Embassy's Cunningham was well ahead of the two drivers in the Xero Corvette in the Drivers' Championship for their class and eventually earned 12th place in the standings.

For 2005, feeling that their partnership with Xero was not to their benefit, Embassy Racing built their own team under the direct control of France. Neil Cunningham was retained as a driver and Ben Collins was signed to a full season contract, both of which shared a new Porsche 911 GT3-RSR. At the Knockhill Racing Circuit, the third race of the year, the duo earned Embassy's first victory, immediately followed by a fourth-place finish in the second race at the circuit. A string of podium finishes continued as the season progressed, including another win at the Silverstone Circuit. At the end of the year, Cunningham and Collins shared second place in the Drivers' Championship. The team also participated in the Spa 24 Hours with Porsche factory driver Sascha Maassen and finished the event fourth in their class, twentieth overall.

=== Le Mans Series ===
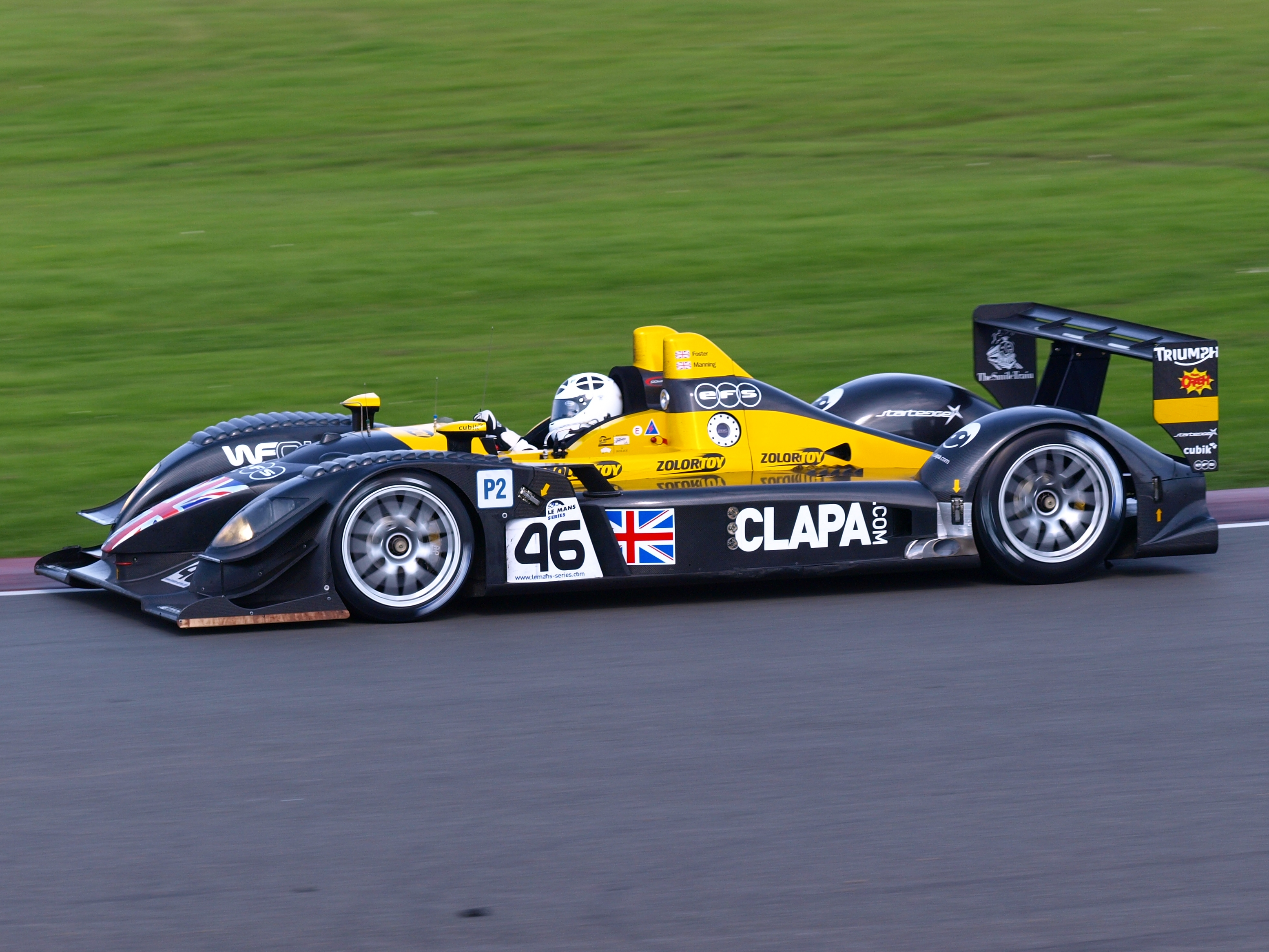
Embassy Racing's first car as a constructor, the WF01 powered by a Zytek V8

Jonathan France chose to put his team on sabbatical in 2006 following the birth of his son, but planned a return in 2007 that expanded the team to an international level. France chose to take his team to the Le Mans Series, a European championship for sports prototypes and grand tourers, and entered the LMP2 class, the lower category amongst the prototypes. Initially, a Pilbeam chassis was purchased and tested, but feeling that the car was not adequate, the Pilbeam was replaced by a newer Radical chassis. Neil Cunningham remained with the team while Warren Hughes joined as his teammate.

In the short Le Mans Series season, Embassy did not start off well as their Radical did not finish the first two events. The team managed to finish their first race in round three, the 1000 km of Nürburgring, with thirteenth place and fifth in their class, earning them points towards the championships. Joined by Darren Manning, the team earned points finishes in the next two races. The season finale, the Mil Milhas Brasil, featured only three cars competing in Embassy's category, but the team's Radical was once again able to finish and earn second in their category. Boosted by the points received at the Mil Milhas Brasil, Embassy Racing finished seventh in the Teams' Championship, and Warren Hughes 18th in the Drivers' Championship.

During the 2007 season, Embassy announced that they were moving to larger facilities in order to allow for the construction and support of a two-car entry in the following season of the Le Mans Series. The new WF01 prototypes, named after France's son William, shares several elements with the team's Radical SR9. This includes the same designer, Peter Elleray, but the new WF01s will instead run Zytek engines instead of the Radical's Judd. The two chassis were completed in time for the 2008 season, and Warren Hughes was partnered with Mario Haberfeld in one entry, while Jonny Kane and Joey Foster share the other car. By the second round of the 2008 season, one of Embassy's WF01's had already earned its first championship points with an eighteenth-place finish at the 1000 km of Monza. Embassy Racing also plans to make their first appearance at the 24 Hours of Le Mans, with Hughes, Kane, and Foster all driving.

At the 2008 24 Hours of Le Mans Embassy qualified 5th in class and 24th overall. The car retired after 15 hours and was classified 39th in the final standings.

The car was entered for one more race only, the 2009 Silverstone 1000km round of the 2009 Le Mans Series, with a finish of 14th.

In 2013, the relaunched Tiga Race Cars bought the IP rights and all existing tooling and data of the WF01, with the intention of modifying the car to comply with the revised cost-cap regulations of the then-current LMP2 class. The car's engine was changed over from its original Zytek V8 to the Judd Power HK V8.

The car did not compete in the 2014 season as originally planned but further development was carried out, with the aim of competing in 2015. The car never competed.

=== British Supersport and Superstock ===
As Embassy Racing was preparing for their entry into the Le Mans Series, team owner Jonathan France also chose to enter the world of motorcycle racing by entering the lower levels of the British national championship. A Yamaha R1 was purchased for use by Glen Richards in the Supersport series. In 2008, Embassy expanded their motorcycle program, signing Australian Paul Young to ride alongside Richards in Supersport, while South African A.J. Venter was signed to ride in the Superstock 600 Championship. The team was also able to sign a deal with Triumph Motorcycles for using their Daytona 675 bikes, as well as support direct from the Triumph factory.
