= 2007 1000 km of Nürburgring =

Sports car endurance race in Germany

Nürburgring

The 2007 1000km of Nürburgring was the third round of the 2007 Le Mans Series season. It took place on 1 July 2007, at the Nürburgring, Germany.

== Official results ==
Class winners in bold. Cars failing to complete 70% of winner's distance marked as Not Classified (NC).

Pos	Class	No	Team	Drivers	Chassis	Tyre	Laps
Pos	Class	No	Team	Drivers	Engine	Tyre	Laps
1	**LMP1**	**8**	**(France) Team Peugeot Total**	**(France) Stéphane Sarrazin (Portugal) Pedro Lamy**	**Peugeot 908 HDi FAP**	MI	**194**
1	**LMP1**	**8**	**(France) Team Peugeot Total**	**(France) Stéphane Sarrazin (Portugal) Pedro Lamy**	**Peugeot HDi 5.5L Turbo V12 (Diesel)**	MI	**194**
2	LMP1	7	(France) Team Peugeot Total	(France) Nicolas Minassian (Spain) Marc Gené	Peugeot 908 HDi FAP	MI	193
2	LMP1	7	(France) Team Peugeot Total	(France) Nicolas Minassian (Spain) Marc Gené	Peugeot HDi 5.5L Turbo V12 (Diesel)	MI	193
3	LMP1	16	(France) Pescarolo Sport	(France) Emmanuel Collard (France) Jean-Christophe Boullion	Pescarolo 01	MI	191
3	LMP1	16	(France) Pescarolo Sport	(France) Emmanuel Collard (France) Jean-Christophe Boullion	Judd GV5.5 S2 5.5L V10	MI	191
4	LMP1	15	(Czech Republic) Charouz Racing System	(Czech Republic) Jan Charouz (Germany) Stefan Mücke (Malaysia) Alex Yoong	Lola B07/17	MI	188
4	LMP1	15	(Czech Republic) Charouz Racing System	(Czech Republic) Jan Charouz (Germany) Stefan Mücke (Malaysia) Alex Yoong	Judd GV5.5 S2 5.5L V10	MI	188
5	LMP1	9	(United Kingdom) Creation Autosportif	(United Kingdom) Jamie Campbell-Walter (Japan) Shinji Nakano (Switzerland) Felipe Ortiz	Creation CA07	D	188
5	LMP1	9	(United Kingdom) Creation Autosportif	(United Kingdom) Jamie Campbell-Walter (Japan) Shinji Nakano (Switzerland) Felipe Ortiz	Judd GV5.5 S2 5.5L V10	D	188
6	**LMP2**	**25**	**(United Kingdom) Ray Mallock Ltd. (RML)**	**(United Kingdom) Mike Newton (Brazil) Thomas Erdos**	**MG-Lola EX264**	MI	**188**
6	**LMP2**	**25**	**(United Kingdom) Ray Mallock Ltd. (RML)**	**(United Kingdom) Mike Newton (Brazil) Thomas Erdos**	**AER P07 2.0L Turbo I4**	MI	**188**
7	LMP2	32	(France) Barazi-Epsilon	(Denmark) Juan Barazi (Netherlands) Michael Vergers (Saudi Arabia) Karim Ojjeh	Zytek 07S/2	MI	187
7	LMP2	32	(France) Barazi-Epsilon	(Denmark) Juan Barazi (Netherlands) Michael Vergers (Saudi Arabia) Karim Ojjeh	Zytek ZG348 3.4L V8	MI	187
8	LMP1	10	(United Kingdom) Arena Motorsports International	(United Kingdom) Tom Chilton (Japan) Hayanari Shimoda	Zytek 07S	MI	187
8	LMP1	10	(United Kingdom) Arena Motorsports International	(United Kingdom) Tom Chilton (Japan) Hayanari Shimoda	Zytek 2ZG408 4.0L V8	MI	187
9	LMP1	14	(Netherlands) Racing for Holland	(Netherlands) David Hart (Netherlands) Jan Lammers (Netherlands) Jeroen Bleekemolen	Dome S101.5	MI	187
9	LMP1	14	(Netherlands) Racing for Holland	(Netherlands) David Hart (Netherlands) Jan Lammers (Netherlands) Jeroen Bleekemolen	Judd GV5.5 S2 5.5L V10	MI	187
10	LMP2	40	(Portugal) Quifel ASM Team	(Portugal) Miguel Amaral (Spain) Miguel Angel de Castro (Spain) Angel Burgueño	Lola B05/40	D	187
10	LMP2	40	(Portugal) Quifel ASM Team	(Portugal) Miguel Amaral (Spain) Miguel Angel de Castro (Spain) Angel Burgueño	AER P07 2.0L Turbo I4	D	187
11	LMP2	27	(Switzerland) Horag Racing	(Switzerland) Fredy Lienhard (Belgium) Didier Theys (Belgium) Eric van de Poele	Lola B05/40	MI	186
11	LMP2	27	(Switzerland) Horag Racing	(Switzerland) Fredy Lienhard (Belgium) Didier Theys (Belgium) Eric van de Poele	Judd XV675 3.4L V8	MI	186
12	LMP1	13	(France) Courage Compétition	(France) Jean-Marc Gounon (France) Guillaume Moreau	Courage LC70	MI	185
12	LMP1	13	(France) Courage Compétition	(France) Jean-Marc Gounon (France) Guillaume Moreau	AER P32T 3.6L Turbo V8	MI	185
13	LMP2	45	(United Kingdom) Embassy Racing	(United Kingdom) Warren Hughes (New Zealand) Neil Cunningham	Radical SR9	D	185
13	LMP2	45	(United Kingdom) Embassy Racing	(United Kingdom) Warren Hughes (New Zealand) Neil Cunningham	Judd XV675 3.4L V8	D	185
14	LMP2	31	(United States) Binnie Motorsports	(United States) William Binnie (United Kingdom) Allen Timpany (United Kingdom) Chris Buncombe	Lola B05/42	MI	183
14	LMP2	31	(United States) Binnie Motorsports	(United States) William Binnie (United Kingdom) Allen Timpany (United Kingdom) Chris Buncombe	Zytek ZG348 3.4L V8	MI	183
15	LMP2	35	(Spain) Saulnier Racing	(France) Jacques Nicolet (France) Alain Filhol (France) Bruce Jouanny	Courage LC75	MI	182
15	LMP2	35	(Spain) Saulnier Racing	(France) Jacques Nicolet (France) Alain Filhol (France) Bruce Jouanny	AER P07 2.0L Turbo I4	MI	182
16	**GT1**	**55**	**(France) Team Oreca**	**(Monaco) Stéphane Ortelli (France) Soheil Ayari**	**Saleen S7-R**	MI	**181**
16	**GT1**	**55**	**(France) Team Oreca**	**(Monaco) Stéphane Ortelli (France) Soheil Ayari**	**Ford 7.0L V8**	MI	**181**
17	LMP1	18	(United Kingdom) Rollcentre Racing	(United Kingdom) Stuart Hall (Portugal) João Barbosa (United Kingdom) Martin Short	Pescarolo 01	D	180
17	LMP1	18	(United Kingdom) Rollcentre Racing	(United Kingdom) Stuart Hall (Portugal) João Barbosa (United Kingdom) Martin Short	Judd GV5.5 S2 5.5L V10	D	180
18	GT1	72	(France) Luc Alphand Aventures	(France) Luc Alphand (France) Jérôme Policand (France) Patrice Goueslard	Chevrolet Corvette C6.R	MI	180
18	GT1	72	(France) Luc Alphand Aventures	(France) Luc Alphand (France) Jérôme Policand (France) Patrice Goueslard	Chevrolet LS7.R 7.0L V8	MI	180
19	GT1	50	(France) Aston Martin Racing Larbre	(France) Christophe Bouchut (Italy) Fabrizio Gollin (Switzerland) Gabriele Gardel	Aston Martin DBR9	MI	180
19	GT1	50	(France) Aston Martin Racing Larbre	(France) Christophe Bouchut (Italy) Fabrizio Gollin (Switzerland) Gabriele Gardel	Aston Martin 6.0L V12	MI	180
20	LMP1	19	(United Kingdom) Chamberlain-Synergy Motorsports	(United Kingdom) Gareth Evans (United Kingdom) Bob Berridge (United Kingdom) Peter Owen	Lola B06/10	MI	179
20	LMP1	19	(United Kingdom) Chamberlain-Synergy Motorsports	(United Kingdom) Gareth Evans (United Kingdom) Bob Berridge (United Kingdom) Peter Owen	AER P32T 4.0L Turbo V8	MI	179
21	GT1	61	(Italy) Racing Box	(Italy) Piergiuseppe Perazzini (Italy) Marco Cioci (Italy) Salvatore Tavano	Saleen S7-R	MI	178
21	GT1	61	(Italy) Racing Box	(Italy) Piergiuseppe Perazzini (Italy) Marco Cioci (Italy) Salvatore Tavano	Ford 7.0L V8	MI	178
22	GT1	73	(France) Luc Alphand Aventures	(France) Jean-Luc Blanchemain (France) Sébastien Dumez (Belgium) Vincent Vosse	Chevrolet Corvette C5-R	MI	177
22	GT1	73	(France) Luc Alphand Aventures	(France) Jean-Luc Blanchemain (France) Sébastien Dumez (Belgium) Vincent Vosse	Chevrolet LS7.R 7.0L V8	MI	177
23	GT1	51	(France) Aston Martin Racing Larbre	(Belgium) Gregory Franchi (Switzerland) Steve Zacchia (United Kingdom) Gregor Fisken	Aston Martin DBR9	MI	176
23	GT1	51	(France) Aston Martin Racing Larbre	(Belgium) Gregory Franchi (Switzerland) Steve Zacchia (United Kingdom) Gregor Fisken	Aston Martin 6.0L V12	MI	176
24	LMP1	12	(France) Courage Compétition	(Switzerland) Alexander Frei (France) Jonathan Cochet	Courage LC70	MI	175
24	LMP1	12	(France) Courage Compétition	(Switzerland) Alexander Frei (France) Jonathan Cochet	AER P32T 3.6L Turbo V8	MI	175
25	**GT2**	**96**	**(United Kingdom) Virgo Motorsport**	**(United Kingdom) Robert Bell (Denmark) Allan Simonsen**	**Ferrari F430GT**	D	**173**
25	**GT2**	**96**	**(United Kingdom) Virgo Motorsport**	**(United Kingdom) Robert Bell (Denmark) Allan Simonsen**	**Ferrari 4.0L V8**	D	**173**
26	GT2	77	(Germany) Team Felbermayr-Proton	(Germany) Marc Lieb (France) Xavier Pompidou	Porsche 997 GT3-RSR	P	173
26	GT2	77	(Germany) Team Felbermayr-Proton	(Germany) Marc Lieb (France) Xavier Pompidou	Porsche 3.8L Flat-6	P	173
27	GT2	90	(Germany) Farnbacher Racing	(Germany) Pierre Ehret (Germany) Dirk Werner (Denmark) Lars-Erik Nielsen	Porsche 997 GT3-RSR	P	172
27	GT2	90	(Germany) Farnbacher Racing	(Germany) Pierre Ehret (Germany) Dirk Werner (Denmark) Lars-Erik Nielsen	Porsche 3.8L Flat-6	P	172
28	GT2	97	(Italy) G.P.C. Sport	(Italy) Matteo Bobbi (Italy) Alessandro Bonetti (Italy) Fabrizio de Simone	Ferrari F430GT	P	171
28	GT2	97	(Italy) G.P.C. Sport	(Italy) Matteo Bobbi (Italy) Alessandro Bonetti (Italy) Fabrizio de Simone	Ferrari 4.0L V8	P	171
29	LMP2	20	(France) Pierre Bruneau	(France) Pierre Bruneau (France) Marc Rostan (United Kingdom) Simon Pullan	Pilbeam MP93	MI	170
29	LMP2	20	(France) Pierre Bruneau	(France) Pierre Bruneau (France) Marc Rostan (United Kingdom) Simon Pullan	Judd XV675 3.4L V8	MI	170
30	GT2	94	(Switzerland) Speedy Racing Team	(Switzerland) Andrea Chiesa (United Kingdom) Jonny Kane (Italy) Andrea Belicchi	Spyker C8 Spyder GT2-R	D	170
30	GT2	94	(Switzerland) Speedy Racing Team	(Switzerland) Andrea Chiesa (United Kingdom) Jonny Kane (Italy) Andrea Belicchi	Audi 3.8L V8	D	170
31	GT2	82	(United Kingdom) Team LNT	(United Kingdom) Richard Dean (United Kingdom) Lawrence Tomlinson	Panoz Esperante GT-LM	P	170
31	GT2	82	(United Kingdom) Team LNT	(United Kingdom) Richard Dean (United Kingdom) Lawrence Tomlinson	Ford (Élan) 5.0L V8	P	170
32	GT2	98	(Belgium) Ice Pol Racing Team	(Belgium) Yves Lambert (Belgium) Christian Lefort (Belgium) Stéphane Lemeret	Ferrari F430GT	P	169
32	GT2	98	(Belgium) Ice Pol Racing Team	(Belgium) Yves Lambert (Belgium) Christian Lefort (Belgium) Stéphane Lemeret	Ferrari 4.0L V8	P	169
33	GT2	92	(France) Thierry Perrier (France) Perspective Racing	(France) Philippe Hesnault (France) Anthony Beltoise (United Kingdom) Nigel Smith	Porsche 997 GT3-RSR	D	169
33	GT2	92	(France) Thierry Perrier (France) Perspective Racing	(France) Philippe Hesnault (France) Anthony Beltoise (United Kingdom) Nigel Smith	Porsche 3.8L Flat-6	D	169
34	LMP2	21	(United Kingdom) Team Bruichladdich Radical	(United Kingdom) Tim Greaves (United Kingdom) Stuart Moseley	Radical SR9	D	165
34	LMP2	21	(United Kingdom) Team Bruichladdich Radical	(United Kingdom) Tim Greaves (United Kingdom) Stuart Moseley	AER P07 2.0L Turbo I4	D	165
35	GT2	76	(France) IMSA Performance Matmut	(France) Raymond Narac (Austria) Richard Lietz	Porsche 997 GT3-RSR	MI	165
35	GT2	76	(France) IMSA Performance Matmut	(France) Raymond Narac (Austria) Richard Lietz	Porsche 3.8L Flat-6	MI	165
36	GT2	78	(Italy) Scuderia Villorba Corse	(Italy) Alex Caffi (Italy) Denny Zardo	Ferrari F430GT	P	165
36	GT2	78	(Italy) Scuderia Villorba Corse	(Italy) Alex Caffi (Italy) Denny Zardo	Ferrari 4.0L V8	P	165
37	GT2	95	(United Kingdom) James Watt Automotive	(United Kingdom) Paul Daniels (United Kingdom) Dave Cox (Switzerland) Joël Camathias	Porsche 997 GT3-RSR	D	165
37	GT2	95	(United Kingdom) James Watt Automotive	(United Kingdom) Paul Daniels (United Kingdom) Dave Cox (Switzerland) Joël Camathias	Porsche 3.8L Flat-6	D	165
38	GT2	99	(Monaco) JMB Racing	(Switzerland) Paolo Maurizio Basso (United Kingdom) Bo McCormick	Ferrari F430GT	D	163
38	GT2	99	(Monaco) JMB Racing	(Switzerland) Paolo Maurizio Basso (United Kingdom) Bo McCormick	Ferrari 4.0L V8	D	163
39	GT2	88	(Germany) Team Felbermayr-Proton	(Germany) Christian Ried (Austria) Horst Felbermayr Jr. (Austria) Thomas Grüber	Porsche 997 GT3-RSR	P	162
39	GT2	88	(Germany) Team Felbermayr-Proton	(Germany) Christian Ried (Austria) Horst Felbermayr Jr. (Austria) Thomas Grüber	Porsche 3.8L Flat-6	P	162
40	GT2	79	(Germany) Team Felbermayr-Proton	(Austria) Horst Felbermayr Sr. (Germany) Gerold Ried (United States) Philip Collin	Porsche 911 GT3-RSR	P	161
40	GT2	79	(Germany) Team Felbermayr-Proton	(Austria) Horst Felbermayr Sr. (Germany) Gerold Ried (United States) Philip Collin	Porsche 3.6L Flat-6	P	161
41	LMP2	29	(Japan) T2M Motorsport	(France) Robin Langechal (Japan) Yutaka Yamagishi	Dome S101.5	MI	159
41	LMP2	29	(Japan) T2M Motorsport	(France) Robin Langechal (Japan) Yutaka Yamagishi	Mader 3.4L V8	MI	159
42 NC	GT2	84	(United Kingdom) Chad Peninsula Panoz	(United Kingdom) John Harsthorne (United Kingdom) Sean McInerney (United Kingdom) Michael McInerney	Panoz Esperante GT-LM	P	97
42 NC	GT2	84	(United Kingdom) Chad Peninsula Panoz	(United Kingdom) John Harsthorne (United Kingdom) Sean McInerney (United Kingdom) Michael McInerney	Ford (Élan) 5.0L V8	P	97
43 DNF	LMP2	44	(Germany) Kruse Motorsport	(Canada) Tony Burgess (France) Jean de Pourtales (Austria) Norbert Siedler	Pescarolo 01	KU	151
43 DNF	LMP2	44	(Germany) Kruse Motorsport	(Canada) Tony Burgess (France) Jean de Pourtales (Austria) Norbert Siedler	Judd XV675 3.4L V8	KU	151
44 DNF	GT2	85	(Netherlands) Spyker Squadron	(Czech Republic) Jaroslav Janiš (Netherlands) Peter Kox	Spyker C8 Spyder GT2-R	D	79
44 DNF	GT2	85	(Netherlands) Spyker Squadron	(Czech Republic) Jaroslav Janiš (Netherlands) Peter Kox	Audi 3.8L V8	D	79
45 DNF	GT2	81	(United Kingdom) Team LNT	(United Kingdom) Tom Kimber-Smith (United Kingdom) Danny Watts	Panoz Esperante GT-LM	P	76
45 DNF	GT2	81	(United Kingdom) Team LNT	(United Kingdom) Tom Kimber-Smith (United Kingdom) Danny Watts	Ford (Élan) 5.0L V8	P	76
46 DNF	LMP1	17	(France) Pescarolo Sport	(Switzerland) Harold Primat (France) Christophe Tinseau	Pescarolo 01	MI	54
46 DNF	LMP1	17	(France) Pescarolo Sport	(Switzerland) Harold Primat (France) Christophe Tinseau	Judd GV5.5 S2 5.5L V10	MI	54
47 DNF	GT2	89	(Denmark) Team Markland Racing	(Denmark) Henrik Møller Sørensen (Denmark) Kurt Thiim (Denmark) Thorkild Thyrring	Chevrolet Corvette Z06	D	54
47 DNF	GT2	89	(Denmark) Team Markland Racing	(Denmark) Henrik Møller Sørensen (Denmark) Kurt Thiim (Denmark) Thorkild Thyrring	Chevrolet LS7 7.0L V8	D	54
48 DNF	LMP1	3	(Monaco) Scuderia Lavaggi	(Italy) Giovanni Lavaggi (Italy) Cristian Corsini	Lavaggi LS1	D	29
48 DNF	LMP1	3	(Monaco) Scuderia Lavaggi	(Italy) Giovanni Lavaggi (Italy) Cristian Corsini	Ford (PME) 6.0L V8	D	29
49 DNF	GT2	83	(Italy) G.P.C. Sport	(Italy) Luca Drudi (Italy) Gabrio Rosa (United Kingdom) Johnny Mowlem	Ferrari F430GT	P	21
49 DNF	GT2	83	(Italy) G.P.C. Sport	(Italy) Luca Drudi (Italy) Gabrio Rosa (United Kingdom) Johnny Mowlem	Ferrari 4.0L V8	P	21
DSQ^{†}	GT1	59	(United Kingdom) Team Modena	(Spain) Antonio García (Brazil) Christian Fittipaldi	Aston Martin DBR9	MI	180
DSQ^{†}	GT1	59	(United Kingdom) Team Modena	(Spain) Antonio García (Brazil) Christian Fittipaldi	Aston Martin 6.0L V12	MI	180

† - #59 Team Modena was disqualified for failing post-race inspection. The car had a fuel tank larger than regulations allowed.

== Statistics ==
- Pole Position - #7 Team Peugeot Total - 1:41.867
- Fastest Lap - #7 Team Peugeot Total - 1:44.046
- Average Speed - 166.384 km/h

Le Mans Series
Previous race: 2007 1000km of Valencia	2007 season	Next race: 2007 1000km of Spa
