= 2007 Le Mans Series =

4th season of sports car racing series

Seasons
- ← 2006 2008 →

The 2007 Le Mans Series was the fourth season of ACO's Le Mans Series. It was a series for Le Mans prototype and Grand Touring style cars broken into four classes: LMP1, LMP2, GT1, and GT2. It began on 15 April and ended on 10 November after six races.

== Schedule ==
Rnd	Race	Circuit	Date
-	(France) LMS Official Test	Paul Ricard HTTT	25 March; 26 March
1	(Italy) 1000 km Monza	Autodromo Nazionale di Monza	15 April
2	(Spain) 1000 km Valencia	Circuit de Valencia	6 May
3	(Germany) 1000 km Nürburgring	Nürburgring	1 July
4	(Belgium) 1000 km Spa	Circuit de Spa-Francorchamps	19 August
5	(United Kingdom) 1000 km Silverstone	Silverstone Circuit	16 September
6	(Brazil) Mil Milhas Brasil (1000 miles)	Autódromo José Carlos Pace	10 November

== Season results ==
Overall winners in bold.

Rnd	Circuit	LMP1 Winning Team	LMP2 Winning Team	GT1 Winning Team	GT2 Winning Team	Results
Rnd	Circuit	LMP1 Winning Drivers	LMP2 Winning Drivers	GT1 Winning Drivers	GT2 Winning Drivers	Results
1	Monza	(France) **#7 Team Peugeot Total**	(Switzerland) #27 Horag Racing	(France) #72 Luc Alphand Aventures	(Italy) #97 GPC Sport	Results
1	Monza	(France) **Nicolas Minassian** (Spain) **Marc Gené**	(Switzerland) Fredy Lienhard (Belgium) Eric van de Poele (Belgium) Didier Theys	(France) Luc Alphand (France) Jérôme Policand (France) Patrice Goueslard	(Spain) Sergio Hernández (Italy) Alessandro Bonetti (Italy) Fabrizio de Simone	Results
2	Valencia	(France) **#8 Team Peugeot Total**	(Portugal) #40 Quifel ASM Team	(France) #55 Team Oreca	(Germany) #77 Felbermayr-Proton	Results
2	Valencia	(France) **Stéphane Sarrazin** (Portugal) **Pedro Lamy**	(Portugal) Miguel Amaral (Spain) Miguel Angel de Castro (Spain) Angel Burgueño	(Monaco) Stéphane Ortelli (France) Soheil Ayari	(Germany) Marc Lieb (France) Xavier Pompidou	Results
3	Nürburgring	(France) **#8 Team Peugeot Total**	(United Kingdom) #25 RML	(France) #55 Team Oreca	(United Kingdom) #96 Virgo Motorsport	Results
3	Nürburgring	(France) **Stéphane Sarrazin** (Portugal) **Pedro Lamy**	(United Kingdom) Mike Newton (Brazil) Thomas Erdos	(Monaco) Stéphane Ortelli (France) Soheil Ayari	(United Kingdom) Robert Bell (Denmark) Allan Simonsen	Results
4	Spa	(France) **#8 Team Peugeot Total**	(United Kingdom) #25 RML	(France) #55 Team Oreca	(Germany) #77 Felbermayr-Proton	Results
4	Spa	(France) **Stéphane Sarrazin** (Portugal) **Pedro Lamy**	(United Kingdom) Mike Newton (Brazil) Thomas Erdos	(Monaco) Stéphane Ortelli (France) Soheil Ayari	(Germany) Marc Lieb (France) Xavier Pompidou	Results
5	Silverstone	(France) **#7 Team Peugeot Total**	(France) #32 Barazi-Epsilon	(France) #55 Team Oreca	(United Kingdom) #96 Virgo Motorsport	Results
5	Silverstone	(France) **Nicolas Minassian** (Spain) **Marc Gené**	(Denmark) Juan Barazi (Netherlands) Michael Vergers (Saudi Arabia) Karim Ojjeh	(France) Soheil Ayari (Monaco) Stéphane Ortelli	(United Kingdom) Robert Bell (Italy) Gianmaria Bruni	Results
6	Interlagos	(France) **#7 Team Peugeot Total**	(France) #32 Barazi-Epsilon	(France) #51 Aston Martin Racing Larbre	(Germany) #77 Felbermayr-Proton	Results
6	Interlagos	(France) **Nicolas Minassian** (Spain) **Marc Gené**	(Denmark) Juan Barazi (Netherlands) Michael Vergers (Saudi Arabia) Karim Ojjeh	(United Kingdom) Gregor Fisken (France) Roland Bervillé (Switzerland) Steve Zacchia (Brazil) Fernando Rees	(Germany) Marc Lieb (Germany) Marc Basseng (France) Xavier Pompidou	Results

== Teams Championships ==
Points were awarded to the top 8 finishers in the order of 10-8-6-5-4-3-2-1. Teams with multiple entries did not have their cars combined and each entry number was scored separately in the championship. Cars which failed to complete 70% of the winner's distance were not awarded points.

The top two finishers in each teams championship earned automatic entry to the 2008 24 Hours of Le Mans.

=== LMP1 Standings ===
Pos	No	Team	Chassis	Engine	MNZ (Italy)	VAL (Spain)	NÜR (Germany)	SPA (Belgium)	SIL (United Kingdom)	MIL^{†} (Brazil)	Total
1	#8	(France) Team Peugeot Total	Peugeot 908 HDi FAP	Peugeot HDI 5.5 L Turbo V12 (Diesel)	3	1	1	1	NC	2	40
2	#16	(France) Pescarolo Sport	Pescarolo 01	Judd GV5.5 S2 5.5 L V10	2	5	3	2	2	4	36.5
3	#7	(France) Team Peugeot Total	Peugeot 908 HDi FAP	Peugeot HDI 5.5 L Turbo V12 (Diesel)	1	Ret	2	Ret	1	1	33
4	#18	(United Kingdom) Rollcentre Racing	Pescarolo 01	Judd GV5.5 S2 5.5 L V10	6	4	9	4	3		19
5=	#15	(Czech Republic) Charouz Racing System	Lola B07/17	Judd GV5.5 S2 5.5 L V10	9	2	4	7	NC		15
5=	#9	(United Kingdom) Creation Autosportif	Creation CA07	Judd GV5.5 S2 5.5 L V10			5	6	4	3	15
7	#17	(France) Pescarolo Sport	Pescarolo 01	Judd GV5.5 S2 5.5 L V10	4	6	Ret	3	Ret		14
8	#10	(United Kingdom) Arena Motorsports International	Zytek 07S	Zytek 2ZG408 4.0 L V8		Ret	6	Ret	5		7
9=	#5	(Switzerland) Swiss Spirit	Lola B07/18	Audi FSI 3.6 L Turbo V8		3					6
9=	#19	(United Kingdom) Chamberlain-Synergy Motorsport	Lola B06/10	AER P32T 3.6 L Turbo V8	Ret	7	10	5	Ret		6
11=	#13	(France) Courage Compétition	Courage LC70	AER P32T 3.6 L Turbo V8	5		8	Ret			5
11=	#12	(France) Courage Compétition	Courage LC70	AER P32T 3.6 L Turbo V8	7	Ret	11	Ret	6		5
13	#14	(Netherlands) Racing for Holland	Dome S101.5	Judd GV5.5 S2 5.5 L V10	8	Ret	7				3
NC	#3	(Monaco) Scuderia Lavaggi	Lavaggi LS1	Ford (PME) 6.0 L V8	Ret		Ret	Ret			0

† - Half-points were awarded at this race due to less than five cars competing in this class.

=== LMP2 Standings ===
Pos	No	Team	Chassis	Engine	MNZ (Italy)	VAL (Spain)	NÜR (Germany)	SPA (Belgium)	SIL (United Kingdom)	MIL^{†} (Brazil)	Total
1	#25	(United Kingdom) RML	MG-Lola EX264	AER P07 2.0 L Turbo I4	2	6	1	1	4		36
2	#40	(Portugal) Quifel ASM Team	Lola B05/40	AER P07 2.0 L Turbo I4	Ret	1	3	2	3		30
3	#32	(France) Barazi-Epsilon	Zytek 07S/2	Zytek ZG348 3.4 L V8	DNS	7	2	Ret	1	1	25
4	#35	(France) Saulnier Racing	Courage LC75	AER P07 2.0 L Turbo I4	4	2	7	4	6		23
5	#27	(Switzerland) Horag Racing	Lola B05/40	Judd XV675 3.4 L V8	1	Ret	4	3	NC		21
6	#31	(United States) Binnie Motorsports	Lola B05/42	Zytek ZG348 3.4 L V8	3	Ret	6	5	5		17
7	#45	(United Kingdom) Embassy Racing	Radical SR9	Judd XV675 3.4 L V8	Ret	Ret	5	6	8	2	12
8=	#46	(United Kingdom) Team LNT	Zytek 07S/2	Zytek ZG348 3.4 L V8					2		8
8=	#21	(United Kingdom) Team Bruichladdich Radical	Radical SR9	AER P07 2.0 L Turbo I4	Ret	3	9	Ret	7		8
8=	#44	(Germany) Kruse Motorsport	Pescarolo 01	Judd XV675 3.4 L V8	5	5	Ret	Ret			8
11	#24	(France) Noël del Bello Racing	Courage LC75	AER P07 2.0 L Turbo I4		4					5
12	#20	(France) Pir Competition	Pilbeam MP93	Judd XV675 3.4 L V8	6	Ret	8	Ret	Ret	Ret	4
NC	#29	(Japan) T2M Motorsport	Dome S101.5	Mader 3.4 L V8		Ret	10				0
NC	#26	(Italy) Ranieri Randaccio	Lucchini LMP2/04	Nicholson McLaren XB 3.5 L V8				NC	Ret		0

† - Half-points were awarded at this race due to less than five cars competing in this class.

=== GT1 Standings ===
Pos	No	Team	Chassis	Engine	MNZ (Italy)	VAL (Spain)	NÜR (Germany)	SPA (Belgium)	SIL (United Kingdom)	MIL^{†} (Brazil)	Total
1	#55	(France) Team Oreca	Saleen S7-R	Ford Windsor 7.0 L V8	Ret	1	1	1	1		40
2	#72	(France) Luc Alphand Aventures	Chevrolet Corvette C6.R	Chevrolet LS7.R 7.0 L V8	1	4	2	3	5	2	37
3	#50	(France) Aston Martin Racing Larbre	Aston Martin DBR9	Aston Martin AM04 6.0 L V12	2	3	3	2	7		30
4	#59	(United Kingdom) Team Modena	Aston Martin DBR9	Aston Martin AM04 6.0 L V12	4	5	DSQ	4	2		22
5	#61	(Italy) Racing Box	Saleen S7-R	Ford Windsor 7.0 L V8	5	2	4	Ret	6		20
6	#51	(France) Aston Martin Racing Larbre	Aston Martin DBR9	Aston Martin AM04 6.0 L V12	Ret	6	6	6	4	1	19
7	#73	(France) Luc Alphand Aventures	Chevrolet Corvette C5-R	Chevrolet LS1 7.0 L V8	3	7	5	Ret	3		18
8	#65	(Austria) Jetalliance Racing	Aston Martin DBR9	Aston Martin AM04 6.0 L V12				5			4

† - Half-points were awarded at this race due to less than five cars competing in this class.

=== GT2 Standings ===
Pos	No	Team	Chassis	Engine	MNZ (Italy)	VAL (Spain)	NÜR (Germany)	SPA (Belgium)	SIL (United Kingdom)	MIL (Brazil)	Total
1	#96	(United Kingdom) Virgo Motorsport	Ferrari F430GT	Ferrari F136 GT 4.0 L V8	3	2	1	2	1		42
2	#77	(Germany) Team Felbermayr-Proton	Porsche 997 GT3-RSR	Porsche M97/77 3.8 L Flat-6	8	1	2	1	Ret	1	39
3	#97	(Italy) GPC Sport	Ferrari F430GT	Ferrari F136 GT 4.0 L V8	1	7	4	3	5		27
4	#78	(Italy) Scuderia Villorba Corse	Ferrari F430GT	Ferrari F136 GT 4.0 L V8	2	3	10	5	6		21
5	#90	(Germany) Farnbacher Racing	Porsche 997 GT3-RSR	Porsche M97/77 3.8 L Flat-6	10	4	3	4	Ret	Ret	16
6	#94	(Switzerland) Speedy Racing Team	Spyker C8 Spyder GT2-R	Audi 4.2 L V8	7	Ret	5	8	4	7	14
7=	#76	(France) IMSA Performance Matmut	Porsche 997 GT3-RSR	Porsche M97/77 3.8 L Flat-6	6	Ret	9	Ret	2		11
7=	#85	(Netherlands) Spyker Squadron	Spyker C8 Spyder GT2-R	Audi 4.2 L V8	Ret	Ret	Ret	Ret	3	4	11
9=	#75	(Monaco) JMB Racing	Ferrari F430GT	Ferrari F136 GT 4.0 L V8						2	8
9=	#98	(Belgium) Ice Pol Racing Team	Ferrari F430GT	Ferrari F136 GT 4.0 L V8	Ret	6	7	6	10		8
11=	#99	(Monaco) JMB Racing	Ferrari F430GT	Ferrari F136 GT 4.0 L V8	13	8	12	10	9	3	7
11=	#88	(Germany) Team Felbermayr-Proton	Porsche 997 GT3-RSR	Porsche M97/77 3.8 L Flat-6	Ret	5	13	7	Ret	8	7
13	#83	(Italy) GPC Sport	Ferrari F430GT	Ferrari F136 GT 4.0 L V8	5	Ret	Ret	Ret	7	Ret	6
14	#81	(United Kingdom) Team LNT	Panoz Esperante GT-LM	Ford (Élan) Cammer 5.0 L V8	4	Ret	Ret	Ret			5
15	#91	(Brazil) Dener Motorsport	Porsche 997 GT3-RSR	Porsche M97/77 3.8 L Flat-6						5	4
16=	#82	(United Kingdom) Team LNT	Panoz Esperante GT-LM	Ford (Élan) Cammer 5.0 L V8	Ret	Ret	6	Ret	Ret		3
16=	#74	(Monaco) JMB Racing	Ferrari F430GT	Ferrari F136 GT 4.0 L V8						6	3
18	#92	(France) Thierry Perrier/Perspective	Porsche 997 GT3-RSR	Porsche M97/77 3.8 L Flat-6	9	10	8		8	NC	2
NC	#84	(United Kingdom) Chad Peninsula Panoz	Panoz Esperante GT-LM	Ford (Élan) Cammer 5.0 L V8	12	9	NC	Ret	13		0
NC	#80	(Belgium) Prospeed Competition	Porsche 997 GT3-RSR	Porsche M97/77 3.8 L Flat-6				9			0
NC	#95	(United Kingdom) James Watt Automotive	Porsche 997 GT3-RSR	Porsche M97/77 3.8 L Flat-6	Ret		11	11	11	Ret	0
NC	#79	(Germany) Team Felbermayr-Proton	Porsche 997 GT3-RSR	Porsche M97/77 3.8 L Flat-6	11		14	12	Ret	NC	0
NC	#89	(Denmark) Markland Racing	Chevrolet Corvette Z06	Chevrolet LS7 7.0 L V8	Ret		Ret	Ret	12	NC	0

== Drivers Championships ==
Points were awarded to the top 8 finishers in the order of 10-8-6-5-4-3-2-1. Drivers who did not drive for at least 45 minutes did not receive points.

=== LMP1 Standings ===
Pos	Driver	Team	MNZ (Italy)	VAL (Spain)	NÜR (Germany)	SPA (Belgium)	SIL (United Kingdom)	MIL^{†} (Brazil)	Total
1	(France) Stéphane Sarrazin	(France) Team Peugeot Total	3	1	1	1	NC	2	40
1	(Portugal) Pedro Lamy	(France) Team Peugeot Total	3	1	1	1	NC	2	40
2	(France) Jean-Christophe Boullion	(France) Pescarolo Sport	2	5	3	2	2	4	36.5
3	(France) Nicolas Minassian	(France) Team Peugeot Total	1	Ret	2	Ret	1	1	33
3	(Spain) Marc Gené	(France) Team Peugeot Total	1	Ret	2	Ret	1	1	33
4	(France) Emmanuel Collard	(France) Pescarolo Sport	2		3	2	2	4	32.5
5	(United Kingdom) Stuart Hall	(United Kingdom) Rollcentre Racing	6	4	9	4	3		22
5	(United Kingdom) Stuart Hall	(United Kingdom) Creation Autosportif						3	22
6	(Portugal) João Barbosa	(United Kingdom) Rollcentre Racing	6	4	9	4	3		19
7	(Switzerland) Harold Primat	(France) Pescarolo Sport	4	6	Ret	3	Ret	4	16.5
8	(Czech Republic) Jan Charouz	(Czech Republic) Charouz Racing System	9	2	4	7	NC		15
8	(Germany) Stefan Mücke	(Czech Republic) Charouz Racing System	9	2	4	7	NC		15
9	(United Kingdom) Jamie Campbell-Walter	(United Kingdom) Creation Autosportif			5	6	4	3	15
9	(Switzerland) Felipe Ortiz	(United Kingdom) Creation Autosportif			5	6	4	3	15
10	(France) Christophe Tinseau	(France) Pescarolo Sport	4	6	Ret	3	Ret		14
11	(Malaysia) Alex Yoong	(Czech Republic) Charouz Racing System		2	4				13
12	(United Kingdom) Tom Chilton	(United Kingdom) Arena Motorsports International			6		5		7
13	(Switzerland) Marcel Fässler	(Switzerland) Swiss Spirit		3					6
13	(Switzerland) Jean-Denis Délétraz	(Switzerland) Swiss Spirit		3					6
13	(Switzerland) Iradj Alexander	(Switzerland) Swiss Spirit		3					6
14	Gareth Evans	(United Kingdom) Chamberlain-Synergy Motorsport	Ret	7	10	5	Ret		6
14	(United Kingdom) Bob Berridge	(United Kingdom) Chamberlain-Synergy Motorsport	Ret	7	10	5	Ret		6
14	(United Kingdom) Peter Owen	(United Kingdom) Chamberlain-Synergy Motorsport	Ret	7	10	5	Ret		6
15	(Japan) Haruki Kurosawa	(United Kingdom) Creation Autosportif					4		5
16	(France) Jean-Marc Gounon	(France) Courage Compétition	5		8	Ret			5
16	(France) Guillaume Moreau	(France) Courage Compétition	5		8	Ret			5
17	(Switzerland) Alexander Frei	(France) Courage Compétition	7	Ret	11	Ret	6		5
17	(France) Jonathan Cochet	(France) Courage Compétition	7	Ret	11	Ret	6		5
18	(France) Romain Dumas	(France) Pescarolo Sport		5					4
=	(Japan) Shinji Nakano	(United Kingdom) Creation Autosportif			5				4
=	(United Kingdom) Max Chilton	(United Kingdom) Arena Motorsports International					5		4
21	(Japan) Hayanari Shimoda	(United Kingdom) Arena Motorsports International			6				3
22	(Netherlands) Jan Lammers	(Netherlands) Racing for Holland	8	Ret	7				3
22	(Netherlands) Jeroen Bleekemolen	(Netherlands) Racing for Holland	8	Ret	7				3
22	(Netherlands) David Hart	(Netherlands) Racing for Holland	8	Ret	7				3
NC	(United Kingdom) Martin Short	(United Kingdom) Rollcentre Racing			9				0
NC	(Italy) Giovanni Lavaggi	(Monaco) Scuderia Lavaggi	Ret		Ret	Ret			0
NC	(Italy) Marcello Puglisi	(Monaco) Scuderia Lavaggi	Ret		Ret				0
NC	(Sweden) Stefan Johansson	(United Kingdom) Arena Motorsports International		Ret		Ret			0
NC	(Japan) Hayanari Shimoda	(United Kingdom) Arena Motorsports International		Ret		Ret			0
NC	(France) Bruno Besson	(France) Courage Compétition		Ret					0
NC	(Germany) Wolfgang Kaufmann	(Monaco) Scuderia Lavaggi				Ret			0
NC	(Russia) Vitaly Petrov	(France) Courage Compétition				Ret			0

† - Half-points were awarded at this race due to less than five cars competing in this class.

=== LMP2 Standings ===
Pos	Driver	Team	MNZ (Italy)	VAL (Spain)	NÜR (Germany)	SPA (Belgium)	SIL (United Kingdom)	MIL^{†} (Brazil)	Total
1	(United Kingdom) Mike Newton	(United Kingdom) RML	2	6	1	1	4		36
1	(Brazil) Thomas Erdos	(United Kingdom) RML	2	6	1	1	4		36
2	(Portugal) Miguel Amaral	(Portugal) Quifel ASM Team	Ret	1	3	2	3		30
2	(Spain) Miguel Ángel de Castro	(Portugal) Quifel ASM Team	Ret	1	3	2	3		30
2	(Spain) Ángel Burgueño	(Portugal) Quifel ASM Team	Ret	1	3	2	3		30
3	(Denmark) Juan Barazi	(France) Barazi-Epsilon	DNS	7	2	Ret	1	1	25
3	(Netherlands) Michael Vergers	(France) Barazi-Epsilon	DNS	7	2	Ret	1	1	25
3	(Saudi Arabia) Karim Ojjeh	(France) Barazi-Epsilon	DNS	7	2	Ret	1	1	25
4	(France) Jacques Nicolet	(Spain) Saulnier Racing	4	2	7	4	6		23
4	(France) Alain Filhol	(Spain) Saulnier Racing	4	2	7	4	6		23
4	(France) Bruce Jouanny	(Spain) Saulnier Racing	4	2	7	4	6		23
5	(Switzerland) Fredy Lienhard	(Switzerland) Horag Racing	1	Ret	4	3	NC		21
5	(Belgium) Eric van de Poele	(Switzerland) Horag Racing	1	Ret	4	3	NC		21
5	(Belgium) Didier Theys	(Switzerland) Horag Racing	1	Ret	4	3	NC		21
6	(United States) William Binnie	(United States) Binnie Motorsports	3	Ret	6	5	5		17
6	(United Kingdom) Allen Timpany	(United States) Binnie Motorsports	3	Ret	6	5	5		17
6	(United Kingdom) Chris Buncombe	(United States) Binnie Motorsports	3	Ret	6	5	5		17
7	(United Kingdom) Warren Hughes	(United Kingdom) Embassy Racing	Ret	Ret	5	6	8	2	12
8	(United Kingdom) Danny Watts	(United Kingdom) Team LNT					2		8
8	(United Kingdom) Tom Kimber-Smith	(United Kingdom) Team LNT					2		8
9	(United Kingdom) Darren Manning	(United Kingdom) Embassy Racing				6	8	2	8
10	(United Kingdom) Tim Greaves	(United Kingdom) Team Bruichladdich Radical	Ret	3	9	Ret	7		8
10	(United Kingdom) Stuart Moseley	(United Kingdom) Team Bruichladdich Radical	Ret	3	9	Ret	7		8
11	(Canada) Tony Burgess	(Germany) Kruse Motorsport	5	5	Ret				8
11	(France) Jean de Pourtales	(Germany) Kruse Motorsport	5	5	Ret	Ret			8
11	(Austria) Norbert Siedler	(Germany) Kruse Motorsport	5	5	Ret	Ret			8
12	(United Kingdom) Robin Liddell	(United Kingdom) Team Bruichladdich Radical		3					6
13	(France) Jean-Marc Gounon	(France) Noël del Bello Racing		4					5
13	(Russia) Vitaly Petrov	(France) Noël del Bello Racing		4					5
14	(Brazil) Mario Haberfeld	(United Kingdom) Embassy Racing						2	4
15	(New Zealand) Neil Cunningham	(United Kingdom) Embassy Racing	Ret	Ret	5				4
16	(France) Pierre Bruneau	(France) Pierre Bruneau	6	Ret	8	Ret	Ret	Ret	4
16	(France) Marc Rostan	(France) Pierre Bruneau	6	Ret	8	Ret	Ret	Ret	4
16	(United Kingdom) Simon Pullan	(France) Pierre Bruneau	6	Ret	8	Ret	Ret		4
17	(United Kingdom) Jacob Greaves	(United Kingdom) Team Bruichladdich Radical					7		2

† - Half-points were awarded at this race due to less than five cars competing in this class.

=== GT1 Standings ===
Pos	Driver	Team	MNZ (Italy)	VAL (Spain)	NÜR (Germany)	SPA (Belgium)	SIL (United Kingdom)	MIL^{†} (Brazil)	Total
1	(Monaco) Stéphane Ortelli	(France) Team Oreca	Ret	1	1	1	1		40
1	(France) Soheil Ayari	(France) Team Oreca	Ret	1	1	1	1		40
2	(France) Patrice Goueslard	(France) Luc Alphand Aventures	1	4	2	3	5	2	37
3	(France) Jérôme Policand	(France) Luc Alphand Aventures	1	4	2	3	5		33
4	(France) Christophe Bouchut	(France) Aston Martin Racing Larbre	2	3	3	2	7		30
4	(Italy) Fabrizio Gollin	(France) Aston Martin Racing Larbre	2	3	3	2	7		30
4	(Switzerland) Gabriele Gardel	(France) Aston Martin Racing Larbre	2	3	3	2	7		30
5	(France) Luc Alphand	(France) Luc Alphand Aventures	1	4	2	3			29
6	(Spain) Antonio García	(United Kingdom) Team Modena	4	5		4	2		22
7	(Italy) Piergiuseppe Perazzini	(Italy) Racing Box	5	2	4	Ret	6		20
7	(Italy) Marco Cioci	(Italy) Racing Box	5	2	4	Ret	6		20
7	(Italy) Salvatore Tavano	(Italy) Racing Box	5	2	4		6		20
8	(Switzerland) Steve Zacchia	(France) Aston Martin Racing Larbre	Ret	6	6	6	4	1	19
8	(United Kingdom) Gregor Fisken	(France) Aston Martin Racing Larbre	Ret	6	6	6	4	1	19
9	(France) Jean-Luc Blanchemain	(France) Luc Alphand Aventures	3	7	5	Ret	3		18
9	(France) Sébastien Dumez	(France) Luc Alphand Aventures	3	7	5	Ret	3		18
10	(Belgium) Vincent Vosse	(France) Luc Alphand Aventures	3		5	Ret	3		16
11	(Belgium) Grégory Franchi	(France) Aston Martin Racing Larbre	Ret	6	6	6	4		14
12	(Brazil) Christian Fittipaldi	(United Kingdom) Team Modena		5		4			9
13	(United Kingdom) Oliver Gavin	(France) Luc Alphand Aventures					5	2	8
14	(United Kingdom) Darren Turner	(United Kingdom) Team Modena					2		8
15	(France) Roland Bervillé	(France) Aston Martin Racing Larbre						1	5
15	(Brazil) Fernando Rees	(France) Aston Martin Racing Larbre						1	5
16	(United States) Liz Halliday	(United Kingdom) Team Modena	4						5
17	(Monaco) Olivier Beretta	(France) Luc Alphand Aventures						2	4
18	(Austria) Thomas Grüber	(Austria) Jetalliance Racing				5			4
18	(Austria) Karl Wendlinger	(Austria) Jetalliance Racing				5			4
18	(Austria) Lukas Lichtner-Hoyer	(Austria) Jetalliance Racing				5			4
19	(France) Didier André	(France) Luc Alphand Aventures		7					2

† - Half-points were awarded at this race due to less than five cars competing in this class.

=== GT2 Standings ===
Pos	Driver	Team	MNZ (Italy)	VAL (Spain)	NÜR (Germany)	SPA (Belgium)	SIL (United Kingdom)	MIL (Brazil)	Total
1	(United Kingdom) Robert Bell	(United Kingdom) Virgo Motorsport	3	2	1	2	1		48
1	(United Kingdom) Robert Bell	(Monaco) JMB Racing						3	48
2	(France) Xavier Pompidou	(Germany) Team Felbermayr-Proton	8	1	2	1	Ret	1	39
2	(Germany) Marc Lieb	(Germany) Team Felbermayr-Proton	8	1	2	1	Ret	1	39
3	(Denmark) Allan Simonsen	(United Kingdom) Virgo Motorsport	3	2	1	2			32
4	(Italy) Alessandro Bonetti	(Italy) GPC Sport	1	7	4	3	5		27
4	(Italy) Fabrizio de Simone	(Italy) GPC Sport	1	7	4	3	5	Ret	27
5	(Italy) Alex Caffi	(Italy) Scuderia Villorba Corse	2	3	10	5	6		21
5	(Italy) Denny Zardo	(Italy) Scuderia Villorba Corse	2	3	10	5	6		21
6	(Spain) Sergio Hernández	(Italy) GPC Sport	1	7		3			18
7	(Germany) Pierre Ehret	(Germany) Farnbacher Racing	10	4	3	4	Ret	Ret	16
7	(Germany) Dirk Werner	(Germany) Farnbacher Racing	10	4	3	4		Ret	16
7	(Denmark) Lars-Erik Nielsen	(Germany) Farnbacher Racing	10	4	3	4	Ret	Ret	16
8	(United Kingdom) Jonny Kane	(Switzerland) Speedy Racing Team	7		5	8	4	7	14
8	(Switzerland) Andrea Chiesa	(Switzerland) Speedy Racing Team	7		5	8	4	7	14
8	(Italy) Andrea Belicchi	(Switzerland) Speedy Racing Team	7		5	8	4	7	14
9	(Germany) Marc Basseng	(Germany) Team Felbermayr-Proton				7		1	12
10	(France) Raymond Narac	(France) IMSA Performance Matmut	6	Ret	9	Ret	2		11
10	(Austria) Richard Lietz	(France) IMSA Performance Matmut	6	Ret	9	Ret	2		11
11	(Netherlands) Mike Hezemans	(Netherlands) Spyker Squadron					3	4	11
12	(Italy) Gianmaria Bruni	(United Kingdom) Virgo Motorsport					1		10
13	(Italy) Matteo Bobbi	(Italy) GPC Sport			4		5	Ret	9
14	(Brazil) Alexandre Negrão, Sr.	(Monaco) JMB Racing						2	8
14	(Brazil) Alexandre Negrão, Jr.	(Monaco) JMB Racing						2	8
14	(Brazil) Andreas Mattheis	(Monaco) JMB Racing						2	8
15	(Belgium) Yves Lambert	(Belgium) Ice Pol Racing Team	Ret	6	7	6		Ret	8
15	(Belgium) Christian Lefort	(Belgium) Ice Pol Racing Team	Ret	6	7	6			8
16	(Germany) Christian Ried	(Germany) Team Felbermayr-Proton	Ret	5	13	7	Ret	8	7
16	(Austria) Horst Felbermayr Jr.	(Germany) Team Felbermayr-Proton	Ret	5	13	7	Ret	8	7
17	(United Kingdom) Peter Dumbreck	(Netherlands) Spyker Squadron					3		6
=	(United Kingdom) Ben Aucott	(Monaco) JMB Racing						3	6
=	(Austria) Philipp Peter	(Monaco) JMB Racing						3	6
19	(Italy) Luca Drudi	(Italy) GPC Sport	5	Ret	Ret	Ret	7	Ret	6
19	(Italy) Gabrio Rosa	(Italy) GPC Sport	5	Ret	Ret	Ret	7		6
19	(United Kingdom) Johnny Mowlem	(Italy) GPC Sport	5	Ret	Ret	Ret	7		6
20	(United Kingdom) Tom Kimber-Smith	(United Kingdom) Team LNT	4	Ret	Ret	Ret			5
20	(United Kingdom) Danny Watts	(United Kingdom) Team LNT	4	Ret	Ret	Ret			5
=	(Netherlands) Peter Kox	(Netherlands) Spyker Squadron	Ret		Ret	Ret		4	5
=	(Netherlands) Paul van Splunteren	(Netherlands) Spyker Squadron						4	5
22	(Belgium) Stéphane Lémeret	(Belgium) Ice Pol Racing Team			7	6			5
23	(Austria) Thomas Grüber	(Germany) Team Felbermayr-Proton	Ret	5	13				4
24	(Brazil) Raul Boesel	(Brazil) Dener Motorsport						5	4
24	(Brazil) Marcel Visconde	(Brazil) Dener Motorsport						5	4
24	(Brazil) Flavio Figueiredo	(Brazil) Dener Motorsport						5	4
25	(Finland) Markus Palttala	(Belgium) Ice Pol Racing Team		6					3
=	(United Kingdom) Richard Dean	(United Kingdom) Team LNT	Ret	Ret	6	Ret	Ret		3
=	(United Kingdom) Lawrence Tomlinson	(United Kingdom) Team LNT			6	Ret	Ret		3
=	(Brazil) Francisco Longo	(Monaco) JMB Racing						6	3
=	(Brazil) Chico Serra	(Monaco) JMB Racing						6	3
=	(Brazil) Daniel Serra	(Monaco) JMB Racing						6	3
28	(France) Philippe Hesnault	(France) Thierry Perrier/Perspective	9	10	8		8		2
29	(Switzerland) Paolo Maurizio Basso	(Monaco) JMB Racing	13	8	12	10	9		1
29	(United Kingdom) Bo McCormick	(Monaco) JMB Racing	13	8	12	10	9		1
30	(France) Anthony Beltoise	(France) Thierry Perrier/Perspective	9	10	8				1
30	(United Kingdom) Nigel Smith	(France) Thierry Perrier/Perspective	9	10	8				1
31	(United Kingdom) Rob Barff	(France) Thierry Perrier/Perspective					8		1
31	(Portugal) Pedro Névoa	(France) Thierry Perrier/Perspective					8		1
