= 2007 1000 km of Monza =

Layout of the Autodromo Nazionale Monza

The 2007 1000 km of Monza was the opening round of the 2007 Le Mans Series season. It took place on 15 April 2007, at Autodromo Nazionale Monza, Italy.

== Official results ==
Class winners in bold. Cars failing to complete 70% of winner's distance marked as Not Classified (NC).

Pos	Class	No	Team	Drivers	Chassis	Tyre	Laps
Pos	Class	No	Team	Drivers	Engine	Tyre	Laps
1	**LMP1**	**7**	**(France) Team Peugeot Total**	**(France) Nicolas Minassian (Spain) Marc Gené**	**Peugeot 908 HDi FAP**	MI	**173**
1	**LMP1**	**7**	**(France) Team Peugeot Total**	**(France) Nicolas Minassian (Spain) Marc Gené**	**Peugeot HDi 5.5 L Turbo V12 (Diesel)**	MI	**173**
2	LMP1	16	(France) Pescarolo Sport	(France) Emmanuel Collard (France) Jean-Christophe Boullion	Pescarolo 01	MI	172
2	LMP1	16	(France) Pescarolo Sport	(France) Emmanuel Collard (France) Jean-Christophe Boullion	Judd GV5.5 S2 5.5 L V10	MI	172
3	LMP1	8	(France) Team Peugeot Total	(France) Stéphane Sarrazin (Portugal) Pedro Lamy	Peugeot 908 HDi FAP	MI	171
3	LMP1	8	(France) Team Peugeot Total	(France) Stéphane Sarrazin (Portugal) Pedro Lamy	Peugeot HDi 5.5 L Turbo V12 (Diesel)	MI	171
4	LMP1	17	(France) Pescarolo Sport	(Switzerland) Harold Primat (France) Christophe Tinseau	Pescarolo 01	MI	170
4	LMP1	17	(France) Pescarolo Sport	(Switzerland) Harold Primat (France) Christophe Tinseau	Judd GV5.5 S2 5.5 L V10	MI	170
5	LMP1	13	(France) Courage Compétition	(France) Jean-Marc Gounon (France) Guillaume Moreau	Courage LC70	MI	168
5	LMP1	13	(France) Courage Compétition	(France) Jean-Marc Gounon (France) Guillaume Moreau	AER P32T 3.6 L Turbo V8	MI	168
6	**LMP2**	**27**	**(Switzerland) Horag Racing**	**(Switzerland) Fredy Lienhard (Belgium) Didier Theys (Belgium) Eric van de Poele**	**Lola B05/40**	MI	**165**
6	**LMP2**	**27**	**(Switzerland) Horag Racing**	**(Switzerland) Fredy Lienhard (Belgium) Didier Theys (Belgium) Eric van de Poele**	**Judd XV675 3.4 L V8**	MI	**165**
7	LMP1	18	(United Kingdom) Rollcentre Racing	(United Kingdom) Stuart Hall (Portugal) João Barbosa (United Kingdom) Phil Keen	Pescarolo 01	D	163
7	LMP1	18	(United Kingdom) Rollcentre Racing	(United Kingdom) Stuart Hall (Portugal) João Barbosa (United Kingdom) Phil Keen	Judd GV5.5 S2 5.5 L V10	D	163
8	LMP2	25	(United Kingdom) Ray Mallock, Ltd. (RML)	(United Kingdom) Mike Newton (Brazil) Thomas Erdos	MG-Lola EX264	MI	161
8	LMP2	25	(United Kingdom) Ray Mallock, Ltd. (RML)	(United Kingdom) Mike Newton (Brazil) Thomas Erdos	AER P07 2.0 L Turbo I4	MI	161
9	**GT1**	**72**	**(France) Luc Alphand Aventures**	**(France) Luc Alphand (France) Jérôme Policand (France) Patrice Goueslard**	**Chevrolet Corvette C6.R**	MI	**160**
9	**GT1**	**72**	**(France) Luc Alphand Aventures**	**(France) Luc Alphand (France) Jérôme Policand (France) Patrice Goueslard**	**Chevrolet LS7.R 7.0 L V8**	MI	**160**
10	GT1	50	(France) Aston Martin Racing Larbre	(France) Christophe Bouchut (Italy) Fabrizio Gollin (Switzerland) Gabriele Gardel	Aston Martin DBR9	MI	159
10	GT1	50	(France) Aston Martin Racing Larbre	(France) Christophe Bouchut (Italy) Fabrizio Gollin (Switzerland) Gabriele Gardel	Aston Martin 6.0 L V12	MI	159
11	GT1	73	(France) Luc Alphand Aventures	(France) Jean-Luc Blanchemain (France) Sébastien Dumez (Belgium) Vincent Vosse	Chevrolet Corvette C5-R	MI	159
11	GT1	73	(France) Luc Alphand Aventures	(France) Jean-Luc Blanchemain (France) Sébastien Dumez (Belgium) Vincent Vosse	Chevrolet 7.0 L V8	MI	159
12	GT1	59	(United Kingdom) Team Modena	(Spain) Antonio García (United States) Liz Halliday	Aston Martin DBR9	MI	158
12	GT1	59	(United Kingdom) Team Modena	(Spain) Antonio García (United States) Liz Halliday	Aston Martin 6.0 L V12	MI	158
13	GT1	61	(Italy) Racing Box	(Italy) Piergiuseppe Perazzini (Italy) Marco Cioci (Italy) Salvatore Tavano	Saleen S7-R	MI	155
13	GT1	61	(Italy) Racing Box	(Italy) Piergiuseppe Perazzini (Italy) Marco Cioci (Italy) Salvatore Tavano	Ford 7.0 L V8	MI	155
14	**GT2**	**97**	**(Italy) G.P.C. Sport**	**(Spain) Sergio Hernández (Italy) Alessandro Bonetti (Italy) Fabrizio de Simone**	**Ferrari F430GT**	P	**154**
14	**GT2**	**97**	**(Italy) G.P.C. Sport**	**(Spain) Sergio Hernández (Italy) Alessandro Bonetti (Italy) Fabrizio de Simone**	**Ferrari 4.0 L V8**	P	**154**
15	GT2	78	(Italy) Scuderia Villorba Corse	(Monaco) Alex Caffi (Italy) Denny Zardo	Ferrari F430GT	P	154
15	GT2	78	(Italy) Scuderia Villorba Corse	(Monaco) Alex Caffi (Italy) Denny Zardo	Ferrari 4.0 L V8	P	154
16	GT2	96	(United Kingdom) Virgo Motorsport	(United Kingdom) Robert Bell (Denmark) Allan Simonsen	Ferrari F430GT	D	154
16	GT2	96	(United Kingdom) Virgo Motorsport	(United Kingdom) Robert Bell (Denmark) Allan Simonsen	Ferrari 4.0 L V8	D	154
17	GT2	81	(United Kingdom) Team LNT	(United Kingdom) Tom Kimber-Smith (United Kingdom) Danny Watts	Panoz Esperante GT-LM	P	153
17	GT2	81	(United Kingdom) Team LNT	(United Kingdom) Tom Kimber-Smith (United Kingdom) Danny Watts	Ford (Élan) 5.0L V8	P	153
18	GT2	83	(Italy) G.P.C. Sport	(Italy) Luca Drudi (Italy) Gabrio Rosa (United Kingdom) Johnny Mowlem	Ferrari F430GT	P	152
18	GT2	83	(Italy) G.P.C. Sport	(Italy) Luca Drudi (Italy) Gabrio Rosa (United Kingdom) Johnny Mowlem	Ferrari 4.0 L V8	P	152
19	GT2	76	(France) IMSA Performance Matmut	(France) Raymond Narac (Austria) Richard Lietz	Porsche 997 GT3-RSR	MI	152
19	GT2	76	(France) IMSA Performance Matmut	(France) Raymond Narac (Austria) Richard Lietz	Porsche 3.8 L Flat-6	MI	152
20	GT2	94	(Switzerland) Speedy Racing Team	(Switzerland) Andrea Chiesa (United Kingdom) Jonny Kane (Italy) Andrea Belicchi	Spyker C8 Spyder GT2-R	D	151
20	GT2	94	(Switzerland) Speedy Racing Team	(Switzerland) Andrea Chiesa (United Kingdom) Jonny Kane (Italy) Andrea Belicchi	Audi 3.8 L V8	D	151
21	GT2	77	(Germany) Team Felbermayr-Proton	(Germany) Marc Lieb (France) Xavier Pompidou	Porsche 997 GT3-RSR	MI	151
21	GT2	77	(Germany) Team Felbermayr-Proton	(Germany) Marc Lieb (France) Xavier Pompidou	Porsche 3.8L Flat-6	MI	151
22	LMP1	12	(France) Courage Compétition	(Switzerland) Alexander Frei (France) Jonathan Cochet	Courage LC70	MI	150
22	LMP1	12	(France) Courage Compétition	(Switzerland) Alexander Frei (France) Jonathan Cochet	AER P32T 3.6 L Turbo V8	MI	150
23	LMP2	31	(United States) Binnie Motorsports	(United States) William Binnie (United Kingdom) Allen Timpany (United Kingdom) Chris Buncombe	Lola B05/42	KU	150
23	LMP2	31	(United States) Binnie Motorsports	(United States) William Binnie (United Kingdom) Allen Timpany (United Kingdom) Chris Buncombe	Zytek ZG348 3.4 L V8	KU	150
24	GT2	92	(France) Thierry Perrier (France) Perspective Racing	(France) Philippe Hesnault (France) Anthony Beltoise (United Kingdom) Nigel Smith	Porsche 997 GT3-RSR	D	149
24	GT2	92	(France) Thierry Perrier (France) Perspective Racing	(France) Philippe Hesnault (France) Anthony Beltoise (United Kingdom) Nigel Smith	Porsche 3.8L Flat-6	D	149
25	LMP1	14	(Netherlands) Racing for Holland	(Netherlands) David Hart (Netherlands) Jan Lammers (Netherlands) Jeroen Bleekemolen	Dome S101.5	MI	146
25	LMP1	14	(Netherlands) Racing for Holland	(Netherlands) David Hart (Netherlands) Jan Lammers (Netherlands) Jeroen Bleekemolen	Judd GV5.5 S2 5.5 L V10	MI	146
26	GT2	90	(Germany) Farnbacher Racing	(Germany) Pierre Ehret (Germany) Dirk Werner (Denmark) Lars-Erik Nielsen	Porsche 997 GT3-RSR	P	144
26	GT2	90	(Germany) Farnbacher Racing	(Germany) Pierre Ehret (Germany) Dirk Werner (Denmark) Lars-Erik Nielsen	Porsche 3.8 L Flat-6	P	144
27	LMP2	35	(Spain) Saulnier Racing	(France) Jacques Nicolet (France) Alain Filhol (France) Bruce Jouanny	Courage LC75	MI	143
27	LMP2	35	(Spain) Saulnier Racing	(France) Jacques Nicolet (France) Alain Filhol (France) Bruce Jouanny	AER P07 2.0 L Turbo I4	MI	143
28	GT2	79	(Germany) Team Felbermayr-Proton	(Germany) Gerold Ried (Austria) Horst Felbermayr Sr. (United States) Philip Collin	Porsche 911 GT3-RSR	MI	143
28	GT2	79	(Germany) Team Felbermayr-Proton	(Germany) Gerold Ried (Austria) Horst Felbermayr Sr. (United States) Philip Collin	Porsche 3.6L Flat-6	MI	143
29	LMP2	44	(Germany) Kruse Motorsport	(Canada) Tony Burgess (France) Jean de Pourtales (Austria) Norbert Siedler	Pescarolo 01	KU	139
29	LMP2	44	(Germany) Kruse Motorsport	(Canada) Tony Burgess (France) Jean de Pourtales (Austria) Norbert Siedler	Judd XV675 3.4 L V8	KU	139
30	LMP1	15	(Czech Republic) Charouz Racing System	(Czech Republic) Jan Charouz (Germany) Stefan Mücke	Lola B07/17	MI	138
30	LMP1	15	(Czech Republic) Charouz Racing System	(Czech Republic) Jan Charouz (Germany) Stefan Mücke	Judd GV5.5 S2 5.5 L V10	MI	138
31	GT2	84	(United Kingdom) Chad Peninsula Panoz	(United Kingdom) John Harsthorne (United Kingdom) Sean McInerney (United Kingdom) Michael McInerney	Panoz Esperante GT-LM	P	134
31	GT2	84	(United Kingdom) Chad Peninsula Panoz	(United Kingdom) John Harsthorne (United Kingdom) Sean McInerney (United Kingdom) Michael McInerney	Ford (Élan) 5.0 L V8	P	134
32	GT2	99	(Monaco) JMB Racing	(Switzerland) Paolo Maurizio Basso (United Kingdom) Bo McCormick (France) Stéphane Daoudi	Ferrari F430GT	D	133
32	GT2	99	(Monaco) JMB Racing	(Switzerland) Paolo Maurizio Basso (United Kingdom) Bo McCormick (France) Stéphane Daoudi	Ferrari 4.0 L V8	D	133
33	LMP2	20	(France) Pierre Bruneau	(France) Pierre Bruneau (France) Marc Rostan (United Kingdom) Simon Pullan	Pilbeam MP93	MI	125
33	LMP2	20	(France) Pierre Bruneau	(France) Pierre Bruneau (France) Marc Rostan (United Kingdom) Simon Pullan	Judd XV675 3.4 L V8	MI	125
34 DNF	GT2	85	(Netherlands) Spyker Squadron	(Netherlands) Peter Kox (Czech Republic) Jaroslav Janiš	Spyker C8 Spyder GT2-R	D	125
34 DNF	GT2	85	(Netherlands) Spyker Squadron	(Netherlands) Peter Kox (Czech Republic) Jaroslav Janiš	Audi 3.8 L V8	D	125
35 DNF	LMP1	19	(United Kingdom) Chamberlain-Synergy Motorsport	(United Kingdom) Gareth Evans (United Kingdom) Bob Berridge (United Kingdom) Peter Owen	Lola B06/10	MI	123
35 DNF	LMP1	19	(United Kingdom) Chamberlain-Synergy Motorsport	(United Kingdom) Gareth Evans (United Kingdom) Bob Berridge (United Kingdom) Peter Owen	AER P32T 3.6 L Turbo V8	MI	123
36 DNF	GT2	88	(Germany) Team Felbermayr-Proton	(Austria) Horst Felbermayr Jr. (Germany) Christian Ried (Germany) Thomas Grüber	Porsche 997 GT3-RSR	D	94
36 DNF	GT2	88	(Germany) Team Felbermayr-Proton	(Austria) Horst Felbermayr Jr. (Germany) Christian Ried (Germany) Thomas Grüber	Porsche 3.8 L Flat-6	D	94
37 DNF	LMP2	40	(Portugal) Quifel ASM Team	(Portugal) Miguel Amaral (Spain) Miguel Ángel de Castro (Spain) Angel Burgueño	Lola B05/40	D	90
37 DNF	LMP2	40	(Portugal) Quifel ASM Team	(Portugal) Miguel Amaral (Spain) Miguel Ángel de Castro (Spain) Angel Burgueño	AER P07 2.0 L Turbo I4	D	90
38 DNF	LMP1	3	(Monaco) Scuderia Lavaggi	(Italy) Giovanni Lavaggi (Italy) Marcello Puglisi	Lavaggi LS1	D	57
38 DNF	LMP1	3	(Monaco) Scuderia Lavaggi	(Italy) Giovanni Lavaggi (Italy) Marcello Puglisi	Ford (PME) 6.0 L V8	D	57
39 DNF	GT1	55	(France) Team Oreca	(Monaco) Stéphane Ortelli (France) Soheil Ayari	Saleen S7-R	MI	52
39 DNF	GT1	55	(France) Team Oreca	(Monaco) Stéphane Ortelli (France) Soheil Ayari	Ford 7.0 L V8	MI	52
40 DNF	LMP2	45	(United Kingdom) Embassy Racing	(United Kingdom) Warren Hughes (New Zealand) Neil Cunningham	Radical SR9	D	49
40 DNF	LMP2	45	(United Kingdom) Embassy Racing	(United Kingdom) Warren Hughes (New Zealand) Neil Cunningham	Judd XV675 3.4 L V8	D	49
41 DNF	GT2	95	(United Kingdom) James Watt Automotive	(United Kingdom) Paul Daniels (United Kingdom) Dave Cox (Switzerland) Joël Camathias	Porsche 997 GT3-RSR	D	45
41 DNF	GT2	95	(United Kingdom) James Watt Automotive	(United Kingdom) Paul Daniels (United Kingdom) Dave Cox (Switzerland) Joël Camathias	Porsche 3.8 L Flat-6	D	45
42 DNF	GT2	82	(United Kingdom) Team LNT	(United Kingdom) Richard Dean (France) Lucas Lasserre	Panoz Esperante GT-LM	P	38
42 DNF	GT2	82	(United Kingdom) Team LNT	(United Kingdom) Richard Dean (France) Lucas Lasserre	Ford (Élan) 5.0 L V8	P	38
43 DNF	GT2	89	(Denmark) Markland Racing	(Denmark) Henrik Møller Sørensen (Denmark) Kurt Thiim (Denmark) Thorkild Thyrring	Chevrolet Corvette Z06	D	29
43 DNF	GT2	89	(Denmark) Markland Racing	(Denmark) Henrik Møller Sørensen (Denmark) Kurt Thiim (Denmark) Thorkild Thyrring	Chevrolet LS7 7.0 L V8	D	29
44 DNF	GT2	98	(Belgium) Ice Pol Racing Team	(Belgium) Yves Lambert (Belgium) Christian Lefort (Belgium) Frédéric Bouvy	Ferrari F430GT	P	25
44 DNF	GT2	98	(Belgium) Ice Pol Racing Team	(Belgium) Yves Lambert (Belgium) Christian Lefort (Belgium) Frédéric Bouvy	Ferrari 4.0 L V8	P	25
45 DNF	GT1	51	(France) Aston Martin Racing Larbre	(Belgium) Gregory Franchi (Switzerland) Steve Zacchia (United Kingdom) Gregor Fisken	Aston Martin DBR9	MI	17
45 DNF	GT1	51	(France) Aston Martin Racing Larbre	(Belgium) Gregory Franchi (Switzerland) Steve Zacchia (United Kingdom) Gregor Fisken	Aston Martin 6.0L V12	MI	17
46 DNF	LMP2	21	(United Kingdom) Team Bruichladdich Radical	(United Kingdom) Tim Greaves (United Kingdom) Stuart Moseley	Radical SR9	D	3
46 DNF	LMP2	21	(United Kingdom) Team Bruichladdich Radical	(United Kingdom) Tim Greaves (United Kingdom) Stuart Moseley	AER P07 2.0 L Turbo I4	D	3
DNS	LMP2	32	(France) Barazi-Epsilon	(Denmark) Juan Barazi (Netherlands) Michael Vergers (Saudi Arabia) Karim Ojjeh	Zytek 07S/2	MI	-
DNS	LMP2	32	(France) Barazi-Epsilon	(Denmark) Juan Barazi (Netherlands) Michael Vergers (Saudi Arabia) Karim Ojjeh	Zytek ZG348 3.4 L V8	MI	-

== Statistics ==
- Pole Position - #7 Team Peugeot Total - 1:34.503
- Fastest Lap - #8 Team Peugeot Total - 1:36.500
- Average Speed - 200.876 km/h

Le Mans Series
Previous race: None	2007 season	Next race: 2007 1000km of Valencia
