= 2007 1000 km of Silverstone =

Sports car endurance race held at Silverstone Circuit, Northamptonshire, England

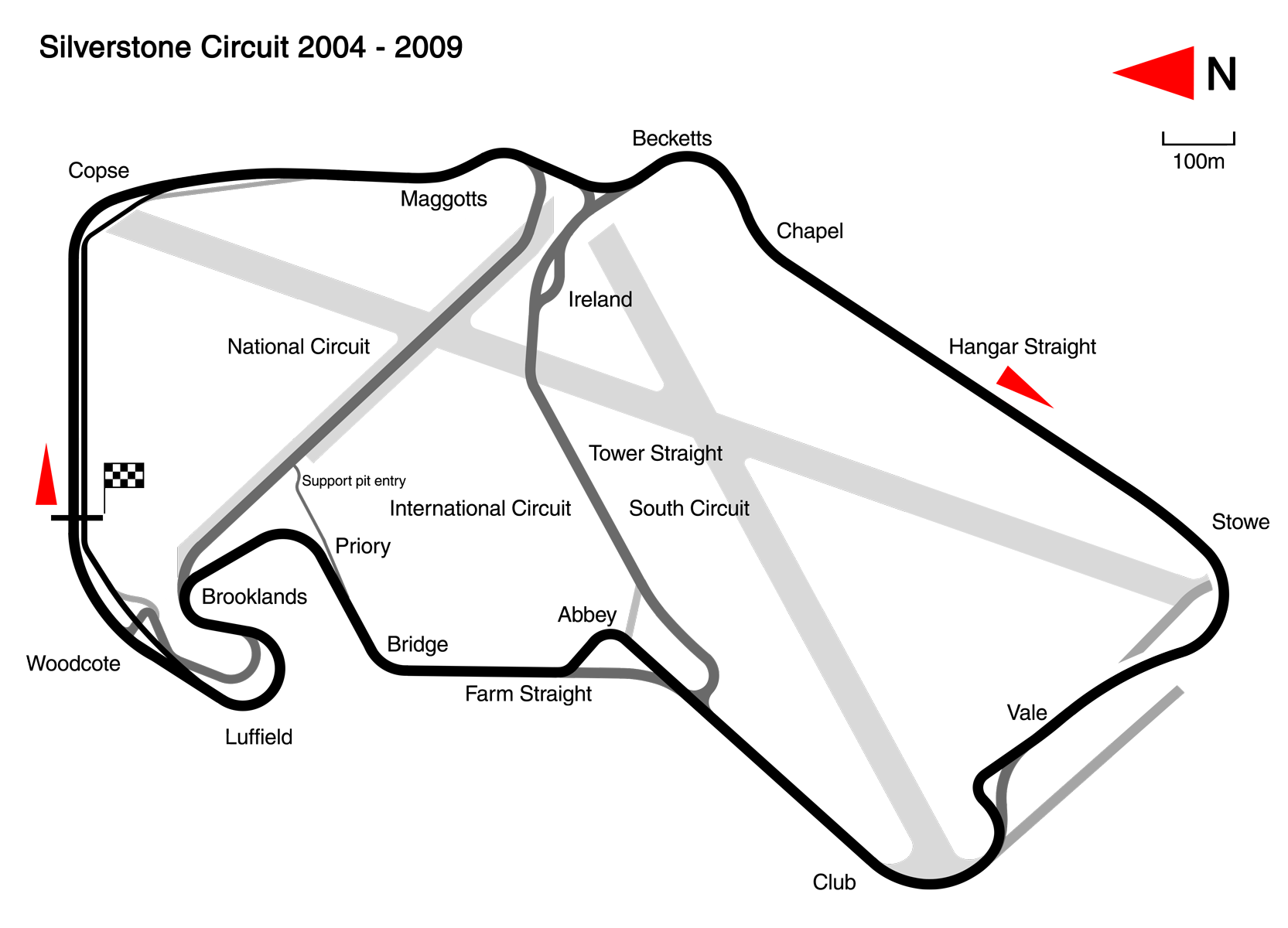
Map of the Silverstone Circuit (2004–2009)

The 2007 1000 km of Silverstone was the fifth round of the 2007 Le Mans Series season. It took place at the Silverstone Circuit, United Kingdom, on 16 September 2007.

== Official results ==
Class winners in bold. Cars failing to complete 70% of winner's distance are marked as Not Classified (NC).

Pos	Class	No	Team	Drivers	Chassis	Tyre	Laps
Pos	Class	No	Team	Drivers	Engine	Tyre	Laps
1	**LMP1**	**7**	**(France) Team Peugeot Total**	**(France) Nicolas Minassian (Spain) Marc Gené**	**Peugeot 908 HDi FAP**	MI	**195**
1	**LMP1**	**7**	**(France) Team Peugeot Total**	**(France) Nicolas Minassian (Spain) Marc Gené**	**Peugeot HDi 5.5L Turbo V12 (Diesel)**	MI	**195**
2	LMP1	16	(France) Pescarolo Sport	(France) Emmanuel Collard (France) Jean-Christophe Boullion	Pescarolo 01	MI	193
2	LMP1	16	(France) Pescarolo Sport	(France) Emmanuel Collard (France) Jean-Christophe Boullion	Judd GV5.5 S2 5.5L V10	MI	193
3	LMP1	18	(United Kingdom) Rollcentre Racing	(United Kingdom) Stuart Hall (Portugal) João Barbosa (United Kingdom) Martin Short	Pescarolo 01	D	191
3	LMP1	18	(United Kingdom) Rollcentre Racing	(United Kingdom) Stuart Hall (Portugal) João Barbosa (United Kingdom) Martin Short	Judd GV5.5 S2 5.5L V10	D	191
4	LMP1	9	(United Kingdom) Creation Autosportif	(United Kingdom) Jamie Campbell-Walter (Japan) Haruki Kurosawa (Switzerland) Felipe Ortiz	Creation CA07	D	188
4	LMP1	9	(United Kingdom) Creation Autosportif	(United Kingdom) Jamie Campbell-Walter (Japan) Haruki Kurosawa (Switzerland) Felipe Ortiz	Judd GV5.5 S2 5.5L V10	D	188
5	**LMP2**	**32**	**(France) Barazi-Epsilon**	**(Denmark) Juan Barazi (Netherlands) Michael Vergers (Saudi Arabia) Karim Ojjeh**	**Zytek 07S/2**	MI	**187**
5	**LMP2**	**32**	**(France) Barazi-Epsilon**	**(Denmark) Juan Barazi (Netherlands) Michael Vergers (Saudi Arabia) Karim Ojjeh**	**Zytek ZG348 3.4L V8**	MI	**187**
6	LMP1	10	(United Kingdom) Arena Motorsports International	(United Kingdom) Max Chilton (United Kingdom) Tom Chilton	Zytek 07S	MI	187
6	LMP1	10	(United Kingdom) Arena Motorsports International	(United Kingdom) Max Chilton (United Kingdom) Tom Chilton	Zytek 2ZG408 4.0L V8	MI	187
7	LMP2	46	(United Kingdom) Team LNT	(United Kingdom) Tom Kimber-Smith (United Kingdom) Danny Watts	Zytek 07S/2	MI	186
7	LMP2	46	(United Kingdom) Team LNT	(United Kingdom) Tom Kimber-Smith (United Kingdom) Danny Watts	Zytek ZG348 3.4L V8	MI	186
8	LMP2	40	(Portugal) Quifel ASM Team	(Portugal) Miguel Amaral (Spain) Miguel Angel de Castro (Spain) Angel Burgueño	Lola B05/40	D	185
8	LMP2	40	(Portugal) Quifel ASM Team	(Portugal) Miguel Amaral (Spain) Miguel Angel de Castro (Spain) Angel Burgueño	AER P07 2.0L Turbo I4	D	185
9	LMP2	25	(United Kingdom) Ray Mallock Ltd. (RML)	(United Kingdom) Mike Newton (Brazil) Thomas Erdos	MG-Lola EX264	MI	184
9	LMP2	25	(United Kingdom) Ray Mallock Ltd. (RML)	(United Kingdom) Mike Newton (Brazil) Thomas Erdos	AER P07 2.0L Turbo I4	MI	184
10	LMP2	31	(United States) Binnie Motorsports	(United States) William Binnie (United Kingdom) Allen Timpany (United Kingdom) Chris Buncombe	Lola B05/42	MI	182
10	LMP2	31	(United States) Binnie Motorsports	(United States) William Binnie (United Kingdom) Allen Timpany (United Kingdom) Chris Buncombe	Zytek ZG348 3.4L V8	MI	182
11	LMP2	35	(Spain) Saulnier Racing	(France) Jacques Nicolet (France) Alain Filhol (France) Bruce Jouanny	Courage LC75	MI	181
11	LMP2	35	(Spain) Saulnier Racing	(France) Jacques Nicolet (France) Alain Filhol (France) Bruce Jouanny	AER P07 2.0L Turbo I4	MI	181
12	**GT1**	**55**	**(France) Team Oreca**	**(Monaco) Stéphane Ortelli (France) Soheil Ayari**	**Saleen S7-R**	MI	**181**
12	**GT1**	**55**	**(France) Team Oreca**	**(Monaco) Stéphane Ortelli (France) Soheil Ayari**	**Ford 7.0L V8**	MI	**181**
13	GT1	59	(United Kingdom) Team Modena	(Spain) Antonio García (United Kingdom) Darren Turner	Aston Martin DBR9	MI	180
13	GT1	59	(United Kingdom) Team Modena	(Spain) Antonio García (United Kingdom) Darren Turner	Aston Martin 6.0L V12	MI	180
14	LMP2	21	(United Kingdom) Team Bruichladdich Radical	(United Kingdom) Tim Greaves (United Kingdom) Stuart Moseley (United Kingdom) Jacob Greaves	Radical SR9	D	180
14	LMP2	21	(United Kingdom) Team Bruichladdich Radical	(United Kingdom) Tim Greaves (United Kingdom) Stuart Moseley (United Kingdom) Jacob Greaves	AER P07 2.0L Turbo I4	D	180
15	GT1	73	(France) Luc Alphand Aventures	(France) Jean-Luc Blanchemain (France) Sébastien Dumez (Belgium) Vincent Vosse	Chevrolet Corvette C5-R	MI	177
15	GT1	73	(France) Luc Alphand Aventures	(France) Jean-Luc Blanchemain (France) Sébastien Dumez (Belgium) Vincent Vosse	Chevrolet LS7.R 7.0L V8	MI	177
16	LMP2	45	(United Kingdom) Embassy Racing	(United Kingdom) Warren Hughes (United Kingdom) Darren Manning (New Zealand) Neil Cunningham	Radical SR9	D	177
16	LMP2	45	(United Kingdom) Embassy Racing	(United Kingdom) Warren Hughes (United Kingdom) Darren Manning (New Zealand) Neil Cunningham	Judd XV675 3.4L V8	D	177
17	GT1	51	(France) Aston Martin Racing Larbre	(Belgium) Gregory Franchi (Switzerland) Steve Zacchia (United Kingdom) Gregor Fisken	Aston Martin DBR9	MI	175
17	GT1	51	(France) Aston Martin Racing Larbre	(Belgium) Gregory Franchi (Switzerland) Steve Zacchia (United Kingdom) Gregor Fisken	Aston Martin 6.0L V12	MI	175
18	GT1	72	(France) Luc Alphand Aventures	(United Kingdom) Oliver Gavin (France) Jérôme Policand (France) Patrice Goueslard	Chevrolet Corvette C6.R	MI	174
18	GT1	72	(France) Luc Alphand Aventures	(United Kingdom) Oliver Gavin (France) Jérôme Policand (France) Patrice Goueslard	Chevrolet LS7.R 7.0L V8	MI	174
19	GT1	61	(Italy) Racing Box	(Italy) Piergiuseppe Perazzini (Italy) Marco Cioci (Italy) Salvatore Tavano	Saleen S7-R	MI	174
19	GT1	61	(Italy) Racing Box	(Italy) Piergiuseppe Perazzini (Italy) Marco Cioci (Italy) Salvatore Tavano	Ford 7.0L V8	MI	174
20	**GT2**	**96**	**(United Kingdom) Virgo Motorsport**	**(United Kingdom) Robert Bell (Italy) Gianmaria Bruni**	**Ferrari F430GT**	D	**173**
20	**GT2**	**96**	**(United Kingdom) Virgo Motorsport**	**(United Kingdom) Robert Bell (Italy) Gianmaria Bruni**	**Ferrari 4.0L V8**	D	**173**
21	LMP1	12	(France) Courage Compétition	(Switzerland) Alexander Frei (France) Jonathan Cochet	Courage LC70	MI	173
21	LMP1	12	(France) Courage Compétition	(Switzerland) Alexander Frei (France) Jonathan Cochet	AER P32T 3.6L Turbo V8	MI	173
22	GT2	76	(France) IMSA Performance Matmut	(France) Raymond Narac (Austria) Richard Lietz	Porsche 997 GT3-RSR	MI	172
22	GT2	76	(France) IMSA Performance Matmut	(France) Raymond Narac (Austria) Richard Lietz	Porsche 3.8L Flat-6	MI	172
23	GT2	85	(Netherlands) Spyker Squadron	(Netherlands) Mike Hezemans (United Kingdom) Peter Dumbreck	Spyker C8 Spyder GT2-R	D	171
23	GT2	85	(Netherlands) Spyker Squadron	(Netherlands) Mike Hezemans (United Kingdom) Peter Dumbreck	Audi 3.8L V8	D	171
24	GT2	94	(Switzerland) Speedy Racing Team	(Switzerland) Andrea Chiesa (United Kingdom) Jonny Kane (Italy) Andrea Belicchi	Spyker C8 Spyder GT2-R	D	170
24	GT2	94	(Switzerland) Speedy Racing Team	(Switzerland) Andrea Chiesa (United Kingdom) Jonny Kane (Italy) Andrea Belicchi	Audi 3.8L V8	D	170
25	GT2	97	(Italy) G.P.C. Sport	(Italy) Matteo Bobbi (Italy) Alessandro Bonetti (Italy) Fabrizio de Simone	Ferrari F430GT	P	169
25	GT2	97	(Italy) G.P.C. Sport	(Italy) Matteo Bobbi (Italy) Alessandro Bonetti (Italy) Fabrizio de Simone	Ferrari 4.0L V8	P	169
26	GT2	78	(Italy) Scuderia Villorba Corse	(Italy) Alex Caffi (Italy) Denny Zardo	Ferrari F430GT	P	168
26	GT2	78	(Italy) Scuderia Villorba Corse	(Italy) Alex Caffi (Italy) Denny Zardo	Ferrari 4.0L V8	P	168
27	GT2	83	(Italy) G.P.C. Sport	(Italy) Luca Drudi (Italy) Gabrio Rosa (United Kingdom) Johnny Mowlem	Ferrari F430GT	P	167
27	GT2	83	(Italy) G.P.C. Sport	(Italy) Luca Drudi (Italy) Gabrio Rosa (United Kingdom) Johnny Mowlem	Ferrari 4.0L V8	P	167
28	GT2	92	(France) Thierry Perrier (France) Perspective Racing	(France) Philippe Hesnault (United Kingdom) Rob Barff (Portugal) Pedro Névoa	Porsche 997 GT3-RSR	MI	164
28	GT2	92	(France) Thierry Perrier (France) Perspective Racing	(France) Philippe Hesnault (United Kingdom) Rob Barff (Portugal) Pedro Névoa	Porsche 3.8L Flat-6	MI	164
29	GT2	99	(Monaco) JMB Racing	(Switzerland) Paolo Maurizio Basso (United Kingdom) Bo McCormick (Portugal) Francisco da Cruz Martins	Ferrari F430GT	D	163
29	GT2	99	(Monaco) JMB Racing	(Switzerland) Paolo Maurizio Basso (United Kingdom) Bo McCormick (Portugal) Francisco da Cruz Martins	Ferrari 4.0L V8	D	163
30	GT2	98	(Belgium) Ice Pol Racing Team	(Belgium) Yves Lambert (Belgium) Christian Lefort (Belgium) Christian Kelders	Ferrari F430GT	P	163
30	GT2	98	(Belgium) Ice Pol Racing Team	(Belgium) Yves Lambert (Belgium) Christian Lefort (Belgium) Christian Kelders	Ferrari 4.0L V8	P	163
31	GT1	50	(France) Aston Martin Racing Larbre	(France) Christophe Bouchut (Italy) Fabrizio Gollin (Switzerland) Gabriele Gardel	Aston Martin DBR9	MI	160
31	GT1	50	(France) Aston Martin Racing Larbre	(France) Christophe Bouchut (Italy) Fabrizio Gollin (Switzerland) Gabriele Gardel	Aston Martin 6.0L V12	MI	160
32	GT2	95	(United Kingdom) James Watt Automotive	(United Kingdom) Paul Daniels (United Kingdom) Dave Cox (Switzerland) Joël Camathias	Porsche 997 GT3-RSR	D	159
32	GT2	95	(United Kingdom) James Watt Automotive	(United Kingdom) Paul Daniels (United Kingdom) Dave Cox (Switzerland) Joël Camathias	Porsche 3.8L Flat-6	D	159
33	GT2	89	(Denmark) Team Markland Racing	(Denmark) Kurt Thiim (Denmark) Henrik Møller Sorenson	Chevrolet Corvette Z06	D	157
33	GT2	89	(Denmark) Team Markland Racing	(Denmark) Kurt Thiim (Denmark) Henrik Møller Sorenson	Chevrolet LS7 7.0L V8	D	157
34	GT2	84	(United Kingdom) Chad Peninsula Panoz	(United Kingdom) John Harsthorne (United Kingdom) Sean McInerney (United Kingdom) Michael McInerney	Panoz Esperante GT-LM	P	156
34	GT2	84	(United Kingdom) Chad Peninsula Panoz	(United Kingdom) John Harsthorne (United Kingdom) Sean McInerney (United Kingdom) Michael McInerney	Ford (Élan) 5.0L V8	P	156
35 NC	LMP1	8	(France) Team Peugeot Total	(France) Stéphane Sarrazin (Portugal) Pedro Lamy	Peugeot 908 HDi FAP	MI	187
35 NC	LMP1	8	(France) Team Peugeot Total	(France) Stéphane Sarrazin (Portugal) Pedro Lamy	Peugeot HDi 5.5L Turbo V12 (Diesel)	MI	187
36 NC	LMP2	27	(Switzerland) Horag Racing	(Switzerland) Fredy Lienhard (Belgium) Didier Theys (Belgium) Eric van de Poele	Lola B05/40	MI	183
36 NC	LMP2	27	(Switzerland) Horag Racing	(Switzerland) Fredy Lienhard (Belgium) Didier Theys (Belgium) Eric van de Poele	Judd XV675 3.4L V8	MI	183
37 NC	LMP1	15	(Czech Republic) Charouz Racing System	(Czech Republic) Jan Charouz (Germany) Stefan Mücke	Lola B07/17	MI	183
37 NC	LMP1	15	(Czech Republic) Charouz Racing System	(Czech Republic) Jan Charouz (Germany) Stefan Mücke	Judd GV5.5 S2 5.5L V10	MI	183
38 DNF	LMP1	19	(United Kingdom) Chamberlain-Synergy Motorsport	(United Kingdom) Gareth Evans (United Kingdom) Bob Berridge (United Kingdom) Peter Owen	Lola B06/10	MI	173
38 DNF	LMP1	19	(United Kingdom) Chamberlain-Synergy Motorsport	(United Kingdom) Gareth Evans (United Kingdom) Bob Berridge (United Kingdom) Peter Owen	AER P32T 4.0L Turbo V8	MI	173
39 DNF	GT2	77	(Germany) Team Felbermayr-Proton	(Germany) Marc Lieb (France) Xavier Pompidou	Porsche 997 GT3-RSR	P	156
39 DNF	GT2	77	(Germany) Team Felbermayr-Proton	(Germany) Marc Lieb (France) Xavier Pompidou	Porsche 3.8L Flat-6	P	156
40 DNF	GT2	88	(Germany) Team Felbermayr-Proton	(Germany) Christian Ried (Austria) Horst Felbermayr Jr. (Austria) Johannes Stuck	Porsche 997 GT3-RSR	P	150
40 DNF	GT2	88	(Germany) Team Felbermayr-Proton	(Germany) Christian Ried (Austria) Horst Felbermayr Jr. (Austria) Johannes Stuck	Porsche 3.8L Flat-6	P	150
41 DNF	GT2	82	(United Kingdom) Team LNT	(United Kingdom) Richard Dean (United Kingdom) Lawrence Tomlinson	Panoz Esperante GT-LM	P	140
41 DNF	GT2	82	(United Kingdom) Team LNT	(United Kingdom) Richard Dean (United Kingdom) Lawrence Tomlinson	Ford (Élan) 5.0L V8	P	140
42 DNF	GT2	90	(Germany) Farnbacher Racing	(Germany) Pierre Ehret (United Kingdom) Piers Masarati (Denmark) Lars-Erik Nielsen	Porsche 997 GT3-RSR	P	72
42 DNF	GT2	90	(Germany) Farnbacher Racing	(Germany) Pierre Ehret (United Kingdom) Piers Masarati (Denmark) Lars-Erik Nielsen	Porsche 3.8L Flat-6	P	72
43 DNF	LMP1	17	(France) Pescarolo Sport	(Switzerland) Harold Primat (France) Christophe Tinseau	Pescarolo 01	MI	67
43 DNF	LMP1	17	(France) Pescarolo Sport	(Switzerland) Harold Primat (France) Christophe Tinseau	Judd GV5.5 S2 5.5L V10	MI	67
44 DNF	GT2	79	(Germany) Team Felbermayr-Proton	(Austria) Horst Felbermayr Sr. (Germany) Gerold Ried (United States) Philip Collin	Porsche 911 GT3-RSR	P	59
44 DNF	GT2	79	(Germany) Team Felbermayr-Proton	(Austria) Horst Felbermayr Sr. (Germany) Gerold Ried (United States) Philip Collin	Porsche 3.6L Flat-6	P	59
45 DNF	LMP2	20	(France) Pierre Bruneau	(France) Pierre Bruneau (France) Marc Rostan (United Kingdom) Simon Pullan	Pilbeam MP93	MI	57
45 DNF	LMP2	20	(France) Pierre Bruneau	(France) Pierre Bruneau (France) Marc Rostan (United Kingdom) Simon Pullan	Judd XV675 3.4L V8	MI	57
DNS	LMP2	26	(Italy) Ranieri Randaccio	(Italy) Ranieri Randaccio (Italy) Giovanni Lavaggi	Lucchini LMP2/04	D	-
DNS	LMP2	26	(Italy) Ranieri Randaccio	(Italy) Ranieri Randaccio (Italy) Giovanni Lavaggi	Nicholson-McLaren 3.3L V8	D	-

== Statistics ==
- Pole Position - #7 Team Peugeot Total - 1:31.692
- Fastest Lap - #7 Team Peugeot Total - 1:30.935
- Average Speed - 176.003 km/h

Le Mans Series
Previous race: 2007 1000km of Spa	2007 season	Next race: 2007 Mil Milhas Brasil
