= 2007 1000 km of Valencia =

Layout of the Circuit Ricardo Tormo

The 2007 1000 km of Valencia was the second round of the 2007 Le Mans Series season. It took place on 6 May 2007, at Circuit de Valencia, Spain.

== Official results ==
Class winners in bold. Cars failing to complete 70% of winner's distance marked as Not Classified (NC).

Pos	Class	No	Team	Drivers	Chassis	Tyre	Laps
Pos	Class	No	Team	Drivers	Engine	Tyre	Laps
1	**LMP1**	**8**	**(France) Team Peugeot Total**	**(France) Stéphane Sarrazin (Portugal) Pedro Lamy**	**Peugeot 908 HDi FAP**	MI	**234**
1	**LMP1**	**8**	**(France) Team Peugeot Total**	**(France) Stéphane Sarrazin (Portugal) Pedro Lamy**	**Peugeot HDi 5.5L Turbo V12 (Diesel)**	MI	**234**
2	LMP1	15	(Czech Republic) Charouz Racing System	(Czech Republic) Jan Charouz (Germany) Stefan Mücke (Malaysia) Alex Yoong	Lola B07/17	MI	232
2	LMP1	15	(Czech Republic) Charouz Racing System	(Czech Republic) Jan Charouz (Germany) Stefan Mücke (Malaysia) Alex Yoong	Judd GV5.5 S2 5.5L V10	MI	232
3	LMP1	5	(Switzerland) Swiss Spirit	(Switzerland) Marcel Fässler (Switzerland) Jean-Denis Délétraz (Switzerland) Iradj Alexander	Lola B07/18	MI	231
3	LMP1	5	(Switzerland) Swiss Spirit	(Switzerland) Marcel Fässler (Switzerland) Jean-Denis Délétraz (Switzerland) Iradj Alexander	Audi 3.6L Turbo V8	MI	231
4	LMP1	18	(United Kingdom) Rollcentre Racing	(United Kingdom) Stuart Hall (Portugal) João Barbosa (United Kingdom) Phil Keen	Pescarolo 01	D	230
4	LMP1	18	(United Kingdom) Rollcentre Racing	(United Kingdom) Stuart Hall (Portugal) João Barbosa (United Kingdom) Phil Keen	Judd GV5.5 S2 5.5L V10	D	230
5	LMP1	16	(France) Pescarolo Sport	(France) Romain Dumas (France) Jean-Christophe Boullion	Pescarolo 01	MI	229
5	LMP1	16	(France) Pescarolo Sport	(France) Romain Dumas (France) Jean-Christophe Boullion	Judd GV5.5 S2 5.5L V10	MI	229
6	LMP1	17	(France) Pescarolo Sport	(Switzerland) Harold Primat (France) Christophe Tinseau	Pescarolo 01	MI	229
6	LMP1	17	(France) Pescarolo Sport	(Switzerland) Harold Primat (France) Christophe Tinseau	Judd GV5.5 S2 5.5L V10	MI	229
7	**LMP2**	**40**	**(Portugal) Quifel ASM Team**	**(Portugal) Miguel Amaral (Spain) Miguel Angel de Castro (Spain) Angel Burgueño**	**Lola B05/40**	D	**224**
7	**LMP2**	**40**	**(Portugal) Quifel ASM Team**	**(Portugal) Miguel Amaral (Spain) Miguel Angel de Castro (Spain) Angel Burgueño**	**AER P07 2.0L Turbo I4**	D	**224**
8	LMP2	35	(Spain) Saulnier Racing	(France) Jacques Nicolet (France) Alain Filhol (France) Bruce Jouanny	Courage LC75	MI	222
8	LMP2	35	(Spain) Saulnier Racing	(France) Jacques Nicolet (France) Alain Filhol (France) Bruce Jouanny	AER P07 2.0L Turbo I4	MI	222
9	LMP2	21	(United Kingdom) Team Bruichladdich Radical	(United Kingdom) Tim Greaves (United Kingdom) Stuart Moseley (United Kingdom) Robin Liddell	Radical SR9	D	222
9	LMP2	21	(United Kingdom) Team Bruichladdich Radical	(United Kingdom) Tim Greaves (United Kingdom) Stuart Moseley (United Kingdom) Robin Liddell	AER P07 2.0L Turbo I4	D	222
10	**GT1**	**55**	**(France) Team Oreca**	**(Monaco) Stéphane Ortelli (France) Soheil Ayari**	**Saleen S7-R**	MI	**222**
10	**GT1**	**55**	**(France) Team Oreca**	**(Monaco) Stéphane Ortelli (France) Soheil Ayari**	**Ford 7.0L V8**	MI	**222**
11	LMP2	24	(France) Noël del Bello Racing	(France) Jean-Marc Gounon (Russia) Vitaly Petrov	Courage LC75	MI	220
11	LMP2	24	(France) Noël del Bello Racing	(France) Jean-Marc Gounon (Russia) Vitaly Petrov	AER P07 2.0L Turbo I4	MI	220
12	GT1	61	(Italy) Racing Box	(Italy) Piergiuseppe Perazzini (Italy) Marco Cioci (Italy) Salvatore Tavano	Saleen S7-R	MI	219
12	GT1	61	(Italy) Racing Box	(Italy) Piergiuseppe Perazzini (Italy) Marco Cioci (Italy) Salvatore Tavano	Ford 7.0L V8	MI	219
13	GT1	50	(France) Aston Martin Racing Larbre	(France) Christophe Bouchut (Italy) Fabrizio Gollin (Switzerland) Gabriele Gardel	Aston Martin DBR9	MI	218
13	GT1	50	(France) Aston Martin Racing Larbre	(France) Christophe Bouchut (Italy) Fabrizio Gollin (Switzerland) Gabriele Gardel	Aston Martin 6.0L V12	MI	218
14	LMP1	19	(United Kingdom) Chamberlain-Synergy Motorsports	(United Kingdom) Gareth Evans (United Kingdom) Bob Berridge (United Kingdom) Peter Owen	Lola B06/10	MI	217
14	LMP1	19	(United Kingdom) Chamberlain-Synergy Motorsports	(United Kingdom) Gareth Evans (United Kingdom) Bob Berridge (United Kingdom) Peter Owen	AER P32T 3.6L Turbo V8	MI	217
15	LMP2	44	(Germany) Kruse Motorsport	(Canada) Tony Burgess (France) Jean de Pourtales (Austria) Norbert Siedler	Pescarolo 01	KU	216
15	LMP2	44	(Germany) Kruse Motorsport	(Canada) Tony Burgess (France) Jean de Pourtales (Austria) Norbert Siedler	Judd XV675 3.4L V8	KU	216
16	LMP2	25	(United Kingdom) Ray Mallock Ltd. (RML)	(United Kingdom) Mike Newton (Brazil) Thomas Erdos	MG-Lola EX264	MI	215
16	LMP2	25	(United Kingdom) Ray Mallock Ltd. (RML)	(United Kingdom) Mike Newton (Brazil) Thomas Erdos	AER P07 2.0L Turbo I4	MI	215
17	GT1	72	(France) Luc Alphand Aventures	(France) Luc Alphand (France) Jérôme Policand (France) Patrice Goueslard	Chevrolet Corvette C6.R	MI	213
17	GT1	72	(France) Luc Alphand Aventures	(France) Luc Alphand (France) Jérôme Policand (France) Patrice Goueslard	Chevrolet LS7.R 7.0L V8	MI	213
18	**GT2**	**77**	**(Germany) Team Felbermayr-Proton**	**(Germany) Marc Lieb (France) Xavier Pompidou**	**Porsche 997 GT3-RSR**	P	**211**
18	**GT2**	**77**	**(Germany) Team Felbermayr-Proton**	**(Germany) Marc Lieb (France) Xavier Pompidou**	**Porsche 3.8L Flat-6**	P	**211**
19	GT2	96	(United Kingdom) Virgo Motorsport	(United Kingdom) Robert Bell (Denmark) Allan Simonsen	Ferrari F430GT	D	210
19	GT2	96	(United Kingdom) Virgo Motorsport	(United Kingdom) Robert Bell (Denmark) Allan Simonsen	Ferrari 4.0L V8	D	210
20	GT2	78	(Italy) Scuderia Villorba Corse	(Monaco) Alex Caffi (Italy) Denny Zardo	Ferrari F430GT	P	210
20	GT2	78	(Italy) Scuderia Villorba Corse	(Monaco) Alex Caffi (Italy) Denny Zardo	Ferrari 4.0L V8	P	210
21	GT2	90	(Germany) Farnbacher Racing	(Germany) Pierre Ehret (Germany) Dirk Werner (Denmark) Lars-Erik Nielsen	Porsche 997 GT3-RSR	P	210
21	GT2	90	(Germany) Farnbacher Racing	(Germany) Pierre Ehret (Germany) Dirk Werner (Denmark) Lars-Erik Nielsen	Porsche 3.8L Flat-6	P	210
22	LMP2	32	(France) Barazi-Epsilon	(Denmark) Juan Barazi (Netherlands) Michael Vergers (Saudi Arabia) Karim Ojjeh	Zytek 07S/2	MI	209
22	LMP2	32	(France) Barazi-Epsilon	(Denmark) Juan Barazi (Netherlands) Michael Vergers (Saudi Arabia) Karim Ojjeh	Zytek ZG348 3.4L V8	MI	209
23	GT2	88	(Germany) Team Felbermayr-Proton	(Germany) Christian Ried (Austria) Horst Felbermayr Jr. (Austria) Thomas Grüber	Porsche 911 GT3-RSR	P	206
23	GT2	88	(Germany) Team Felbermayr-Proton	(Germany) Christian Ried (Austria) Horst Felbermayr Jr. (Austria) Thomas Grüber	Porsche 3.8L Flat-6	P	206
24	GT2	98	(Belgium) Ice Pol Racing Team	(Belgium) Yves Lambert (Belgium) Christian Lefort (Finland) Markus Palttala	Ferrari F430GT	P	206
24	GT2	98	(Belgium) Ice Pol Racing Team	(Belgium) Yves Lambert (Belgium) Christian Lefort (Finland) Markus Palttala	Ferrari 4.0L V8	P	206
25	GT1	59	(United Kingdom) Team Modena	(Spain) Antonio García (Brazil) Christian Fittipaldi	Aston Martin DBR9	MI	203
25	GT1	59	(United Kingdom) Team Modena	(Spain) Antonio García (Brazil) Christian Fittipaldi	Aston Martin 6.0L V12	MI	203
26	GT2	97	(Italy) G.P.C. Sport	(Spain) Sergio Hernández (Italy) Alessandro Bonetti (Italy) Fabrizio de Simone	Ferrari F430GT	P	201
26	GT2	97	(Italy) G.P.C. Sport	(Spain) Sergio Hernández (Italy) Alessandro Bonetti (Italy) Fabrizio de Simone	Ferrari 4.0L V8	P	201
27 DNF	GT2	94	(Switzerland) Speedy Racing Team	(Switzerland) Andrea Chiesa (United Kingdom) Jonny Kane (Italy) Andrea Belicchi	Spyker C8 Spyder GT2-R	D	199
27 DNF	GT2	94	(Switzerland) Speedy Racing Team	(Switzerland) Andrea Chiesa (United Kingdom) Jonny Kane (Italy) Andrea Belicchi	Audi 3.8L V8	D	199
28	GT2	99	(Monaco) JMB Racing	(Switzerland) Paolo Maurizio Basso (United Kingdom) Bo McCormick	Ferrari F430GT	D	197
28	GT2	99	(Monaco) JMB Racing	(Switzerland) Paolo Maurizio Basso (United Kingdom) Bo McCormick	Ferrari 4.0L V8	D	197
29 DNF	GT2	85	(Netherlands) Spyker Squadron	(Czech Republic) Jaroslav Janiš (Netherlands) Sandor van Es	Spyker C8 Spyder GT2-R	D	196
29 DNF	GT2	85	(Netherlands) Spyker Squadron	(Czech Republic) Jaroslav Janiš (Netherlands) Sandor van Es	Audi 3.8L V8	D	196
30	GT1	51	(France) Aston Martin Racing Larbre	(Belgium) Gregory Franchi (Switzerland) Steve Zacchia (United Kingdom) Gregor Fisken	Aston Martin DBR9	MI	192
30	GT1	51	(France) Aston Martin Racing Larbre	(Belgium) Gregory Franchi (Switzerland) Steve Zacchia (United Kingdom) Gregor Fisken	Aston Martin 6.0L V12	MI	192
31	GT1	73	(France) Luc Alphand Aventures	(France) Jean-Luc Blanchemain (France) Sébastien Dumez (France) Didier André	Chevrolet Corvette C5-R	MI	188
31	GT1	73	(France) Luc Alphand Aventures	(France) Jean-Luc Blanchemain (France) Sébastien Dumez (France) Didier André	Chevrolet LS7.R 7.0L V8	MI	188
32	GT2	84	(United Kingdom) Chad Peninsula Panoz	(United Kingdom) John Harsthorne (United Kingdom) Sean McInerney (United Kingdom) Michael McInerney	Panoz Esperante GT-LM	P	188
32	GT2	84	(United Kingdom) Chad Peninsula Panoz	(United Kingdom) John Harsthorne (United Kingdom) Sean McInerney (United Kingdom) Michael McInerney	Ford (Élan) 5.0L V8	P	188
33 DNF	GT2	76	(France) IMSA Performance Matmut	(France) Raymond Narac (Austria) Richard Lietz	Porsche 997 GT3-RSR	MI	184
33 DNF	GT2	76	(France) IMSA Performance Matmut	(France) Raymond Narac (Austria) Richard Lietz	Porsche 3.8L Flat-6	MI	184
34	GT2	92	(France) Thierry Perrier (France) Perspective Racing	(France) Philippe Hesnault (France) Anthony Beltoise (United Kingdom) Nigel Smith	Porsche 997 GT3-RSR	D	173
34	GT2	92	(France) Thierry Perrier (France) Perspective Racing	(France) Philippe Hesnault (France) Anthony Beltoise (United Kingdom) Nigel Smith	Porsche 3.8L Flat-6	D	173
35 DNF	LMP2	20	(France) Pierre Bruneau	(France) Pierre Bruneau (France) Marc Rostan (United Kingdom) Simon Pullan	Pilbeam MP93	MI	172
35 DNF	LMP2	20	(France) Pierre Bruneau	(France) Pierre Bruneau (France) Marc Rostan (United Kingdom) Simon Pullan	Judd XV675 3.4L V8	MI	172
36 DNF	LMP1	7	(France) Team Peugeot Total	(France) Nicolas Minassian (Spain) Marc Gené	Peugeot 908 HDi FAP	MI	168
36 DNF	LMP1	7	(France) Team Peugeot Total	(France) Nicolas Minassian (Spain) Marc Gené	Peugeot HDi 5.5L Turbo V12 (Diesel)	MI	168
37 DNF	GT2	83	(Italy) G.P.C. Sport	(Italy) Luca Drudi (Italy) Gabrio Rosa (United Kingdom) Johnny Mowlem	Ferrari F430GT	P	167
37 DNF	GT2	83	(Italy) G.P.C. Sport	(Italy) Luca Drudi (Italy) Gabrio Rosa (United Kingdom) Johnny Mowlem	Ferrari 4.0L V8	P	167
38 DNF	LMP2	27	(Switzerland) Horag Racing	(Switzerland) Fredy Lienhard (Belgium) Didier Theys (Belgium) Eric van de Poele	Lola B05/40	MI	166
38 DNF	LMP2	27	(Switzerland) Horag Racing	(Switzerland) Fredy Lienhard (Belgium) Didier Theys (Belgium) Eric van de Poele	Judd XV675 3.4L V8	MI	166
39 DNF	GT2	82	(United Kingdom) Team LNT	(United Kingdom) Richard Dean (United States) Tommy Milner	Panoz Esperante GT-LM	P	154
39 DNF	GT2	82	(United Kingdom) Team LNT	(United Kingdom) Richard Dean (United States) Tommy Milner	Ford (Élan) 5.0L V8	P	154
40 DNF	LMP1	10	(United Kingdom) Arena Motorsports International	(Sweden) Stefan Johansson (Japan) Hayanari Shimoda	Zytek 07S	MI	125
40 DNF	LMP1	10	(United Kingdom) Arena Motorsports International	(Sweden) Stefan Johansson (Japan) Hayanari Shimoda	Zytek 2ZG408 4.0L V8	MI	125
41 DNF	LMP1	12	(France) Courage Compétition	(Switzerland) Alexander Frei (France) Jonathan Cochet (France) Bruno Besson	Courage LC70	MI	124
41 DNF	LMP1	12	(France) Courage Compétition	(Switzerland) Alexander Frei (France) Jonathan Cochet (France) Bruno Besson	AER P32T 3.6L Turbo V8	MI	124
42 DNF	LMP1	14	(Netherlands) Racing for Holland	(Netherlands) David Hart (Netherlands) Jan Lammers (Netherlands) Jeroen Bleekemolen	Dome S101.5	MI	105
42 DNF	LMP1	14	(Netherlands) Racing for Holland	(Netherlands) David Hart (Netherlands) Jan Lammers (Netherlands) Jeroen Bleekemolen	Judd GV5.5 S2 5.5L V10	MI	105
43 DNF	GT2	81	(United Kingdom) Team LNT	(United Kingdom) Tom Kimber-Smith (United Kingdom) Danny Watts	Panoz Esperante GT-LM	P	84
43 DNF	GT2	81	(United Kingdom) Team LNT	(United Kingdom) Tom Kimber-Smith (United Kingdom) Danny Watts	Ford (Élan) 5.0L V8	P	84
44 DNF	LMP2	45	(United Kingdom) Embassy Racing	(United Kingdom) Warren Hughes (New Zealand) Neil Cunningham	Radical SR9	D	22
44 DNF	LMP2	45	(United Kingdom) Embassy Racing	(United Kingdom) Warren Hughes (New Zealand) Neil Cunningham	Judd XV675 3.4L V8	D	22
45 DNF	LMP2	31	(United States) Binnie Motorsports	(United States) William Binnie (United Kingdom) Allen Timpany (United Kingdom) Chris Buncombe	Lola B05/42	MI	22
45 DNF	LMP2	31	(United States) Binnie Motorsports	(United States) William Binnie (United Kingdom) Allen Timpany (United Kingdom) Chris Buncombe	Zytek ZG348 3.4L V8	MI	22
46 DNF	LMP2	29	(Japan) T2M Motorsport	(France) Robin Langechal (Japan) Koji Yamanishi	Dome S101.5	MI	22
46 DNF	LMP2	29	(Japan) T2M Motorsport	(France) Robin Langechal (Japan) Koji Yamanishi	Mader 3.4L V8	MI	22

== Statistics ==
- Pole Position - #7 Team Peugeot Total - 1:23.489
- Fastest Lap - #8 Team Peugeot Total - 1:25.234
- Average Speed - 156.265 km/h

Le Mans Series
Previous race: 2007 1000km of Monza	2007 season	Next race: 2007 1000km of Nürburgring
