= Andrea Chiesa =

Swiss racing driver (born 1964)

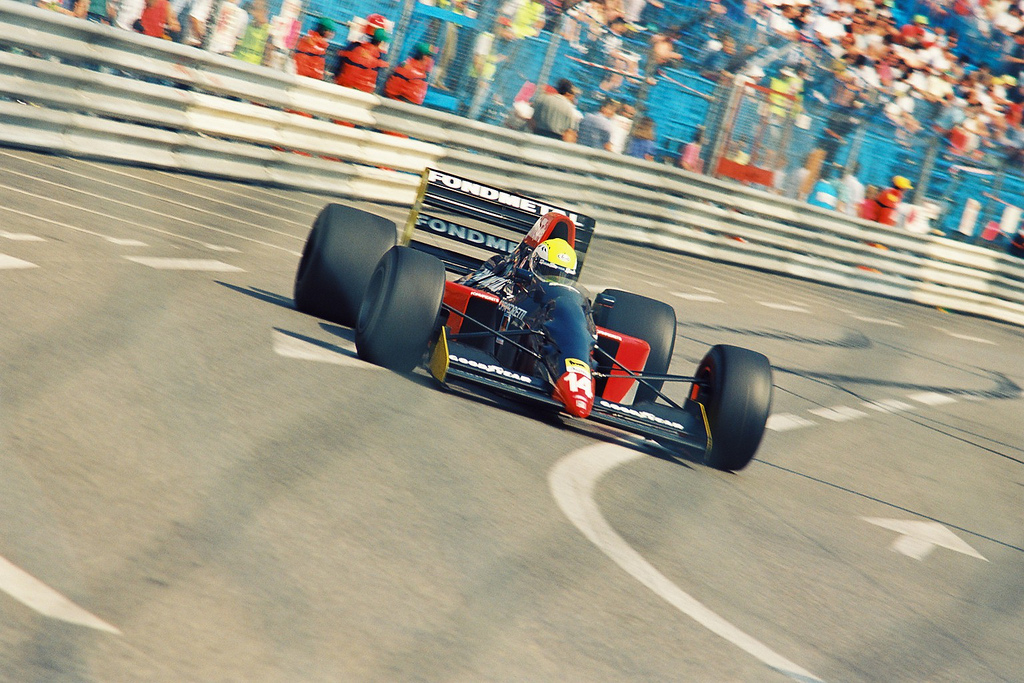
- Born: 6 May 1964 (age 62); Milan, Italy

Formula One World Championship career
- Nationality: (Switzerland) Swiss
- Active years: 1992
- Team: Fondmetal
- Entries: 10 (3 starts)
- Championships: 0
- Wins: 0
- Podiums: 0
- Career points: 0
- Pole positions: 0
- Fastest laps: 0
- First entry: 1992 South African Grand Prix
- Last entry: 1992 German Grand Prix

Andrea Chiesa (born 6 May 1964) is a former Formula One driver from Switzerland. He participated in ten Grands Prix, debuting on 1 March 1992.

== Career ==
Chiesa began racing in 1980 with karts, and continued to cars in 1985, competing in Italian Formula 3 and Formula 3000. In 1992, he progressed to Formula One and raced with the Fondmetal team. However, he qualified for only three grands prix out of ten, and scored no championship points after retiring from each race. After the German GP, the team replaced him with Eric van de Poele. After Formula One, Chiesa returned to kart racing and touring cars for several years.

Chiesa currently drives GT cars. In 2007, he raced for Speedy Racing in a Spyker C8 GT2 car in LeMans Series. In April 2009, racing squad Swiss Team announced they would be fielding a Maserati Quattroporte in the Italian Superstars touring car series with Chiesa as a driver.

== Racing record ==
=== Career summary ===
Season	Series	Team	Races	Wins	Poles	F/Laps	Podiums	Points	Position
1985	Italian Formula Three Championship	Trivellato Racing	11	0	0	0	0	0	NC
1986	Italian Formula Three Championship	Trivellato Racing	13	0	0	1	2	12	10th
1987	Italian Formula Three Championship	Euroracing Junior Team	12	3	3	1	6	48	2nd
1988	International Formula 3000	CoBRa Motorsports	9	0	0	0	0	1	20th
1989	International Formula 3000	Roni Motorsport	10	1	0	0	1	15	6th
1990	International Formula 3000	Paul Stewart Racing	11	0	0	0	2	18	7th
1991	International Formula 3000	Apomatox	7	0	0	0	0	0	NC
1992	Formula One	Fondmetal F1 SpA	3	0	0	0	0	0	NC
1993	PPG Indy Car World Series	Euromotorsport	1	0	0	0	0	0	50th
1996	BPR Global GT Series - GT2	Callaway Schweiz	2	0	0	0	0	3	158th
1997	IMSA GT Championship - WSC	Target 24 Racing	1	0	0	0	0	14	67th
1998	International Sports Racing Series	Target 24 Racing	6	0	0	0	2	46	5th
2000	Belgian Procar		1	0	0	0	0	2	83rd
2000	SportsRacing World Cup - SR1	R&M	1	0	0	0	0	4	36th
2001	FIA GT Championship - NGT	Autorlando Sport	3	0	0	0	0	13	14th
2001	FIA GT Championship - NGT	Haberthur Racing	1	0	0	0	0	13	14th
2001	FIA GT Championship - NGT	Freisinger Motorsport	1	0	0	0	1	13	14th
2003	FIA GT Championship - NGT	Seikel Motorsport	1	0	0	0	1	14.5	21st
2003	American Le Mans Series - GT	Seikel Motorsport	1	0	0	0	1	19	28th
2003	Grand Am Series - GT	Seikel Motorsport	1	0	0	0	0	0	NC
2003	Italian GT Championship - N-GT	Kessel Racing	10	2	0	0	6	114	1st
2004	Italian GT Championship - N-GT	Kessel Racing	16	4	7	0	13	234	1st
2005	Italian GT Championship - GT1	Kessel Racing	12	0	0	0	2	82	7th
2006	Italian GT Championship - GT1	Kessel Racing	13	1	0	0	8	163	6th
2007	Le Mans Series - LMGT2	Speedy Racing Team	6	0	0	0	0	14	8th
2007	24 Hours of Le Mans - LMGT2	Spyker Squadron	1	0	0	0	0	N/A	DNF
2008	Le Mans Series - LMGT2	Speedy Racing Team Sebah	5	0	0	0	0	11	9th
2008	24 Hours of Le Mans - LMGT2	Speedy Racing Team Sebah	1	0	0	0	0	N/A	DNF
2009	Superstars Series	Swiss Team	8	0	0	0	0	7	20th
2010	Superstars Series	Swiss Team	7	0	0	0	0	0	34th
2011	Superstars Series	Swiss Team	3	0	0	0	1	20	13th

=== Complete International Formula 3000 results ===
(key) (Races in bold indicate pole position) (Races in italics indicate fastest lap)

Year	Entrant	1	2	3	4	5	6	7	8	9	10	11	DC	Points
1988	CoBRa Motorsports	JER; DNQ	VAL; Ret	PAU; Ret	SIL; 15	MNZ; 6	PER; 10	BRH; 8	BIR; Ret	BUG; DNQ	ZOL; 13	DIJ; DNS	20th	1
1989	Roni Motorsport	SIL; 11	VAL; 2	PAU; Ret	JER; Ret	PER; 1	BRH; Ret	BIR; 13	SPA; 17	BUG; Ret	DIJ; Ret		6th	15
1990	Paul Stewart Racing	DON; 2	SIL; Ret	PAU; Ret	JER; 5	MNZ; 7	PER; Ret	HOC; Ret	BRH; 5	BIR; 2	BUG; 5	NOG; Ret	7th	18
1991	Apomatox	VAL; Ret	PAU; Ret	JER; 9	MUG; DNQ	PER; Ret	HOC; 10	BRH; 14	SPA; 13	BUG	NOG		NC	0

=== Complete Formula One results ===
(key)

Year	Entrant	Chassis	Engine	1	2	3	4	5	6	7	8	9	10	11	12	13	14	15	16	WDC	Points
1992	Fondmetal F1 SpA	Fondmetal GR01	Ford HB 3.5 L V8	RSA; DNQ	MEX; Ret	BRA; DNQ	ESP; Ret	SMR; DNQ	MON; DNQ	CAN; DNQ		GBR; DNQ		HUN	BEL	ITA	POR	JPN	AUS	NC	0
1992	Fondmetal F1 SpA	Fondmetal GR02	Ford HB 3.5 L V8								FRA; Ret		GER; DNQ							NC	0

=== American Open Wheel ===
(key)

==== CART ====
Year	Team	No.	1	2	3	4	5	6	7	8	9	10	11	12	13	14	15	16	Rank	Points	Ref
1993	Euromotorsport	42	SRF; 26	PHX	LBH	INDY	MIL	DET	POR	CLE	TOR	MIS	NHM	ROA	VAN	MDO	NZR	LS	**50th**	**0**	

=== Complete FIA GT Championship results ===
(key) (Races in bold indicate pole position) (Races in italics indicate fastest lap)

Year	Team	Class	Car	Engine	1	2	3	4	5	6	7	8	9	10	11	Pos.	Points
2001	Autorlando Sport	N-GT	Porsche 911 GT3-RS	Porsche 3.6 L Flat-6	MNZ	BRN; 6	MAG	SIL	ZOL	HUN; Ret				JAR; Ret	EST	14th	13
2001	Freisinger Motorsport	N-GT	Porsche 911 GT3-RS	Porsche 3.6 L Flat-6							SPA; 2					14th	13
2001	Haberthur Racing	N-GT	Porsche 911 GT3-R	Porsche 3.6 L Flat-6								A1R; Ret	NÜR			14th	13
2003	Seikel Motorsport	N-GT	Porsche 911 GT3-RS	Porsche 3.6 L Flat-6	CAT	MAG	PER	BRN	DON	SPA; 2	AND	OSC	EST	MNZ		18th	14.5

=== Complete Le Mans Series results ===
(key) (Races in bold indicate pole position) (Races in italics indicate fastest lap)

Year	Entrant	Class	Chassis	Engine	1	2	3	4	5	6	Rank	Points
2007	Speedy Racing Team	GT2	Spyker C8 Spyder GT2-R	Audi 3.8 L V8	MNZ; 7	VAL; Ret	NÜR; 5	SPA; 8	SIL; 4	INT; 7	8th	14
2008	Speedy Racing Team Sebah	GT2	Spyker C8 Laviolette GT2-R	Audi 4.0 L V8	CAT; Ret	MNZ; 4	SPA; 4	NÜR; Ret	SIL; 8		9th	11

=== 24 Hours of Le Mans results ===
Year	Team	Co-Drivers	Car	Class	Laps	Pos.	Class Pos.
2007	(Netherlands) Spyker Squadron	(Italy) Andrea Belicchi (Italy) Alex Caffi	Spyker C8 Spyder GT2-R	GT2	145	DNF	DNF
2008	(Switzerland) Speedy Racing Team	(Switzerland) Iradj Alexander (Switzerland) Benjamin Leuenberger	Spyker C8 Laviolette GT2-R	GT2	72	DNF	DNF

=== Complete International Superstars Series results ===
(key) (Races in bold indicate pole position) (Races in italics indicate fastest lap)

Year	Team	Car	1	2	3	4	5	6	7	8	9	10	11	12	13	14	15	16	DC	Points
2009	Swiss Team	Maserati Quattroporte	IMO; 1	IMO; 2	ALG; 1; 9	ALG; 2; 9	MUG; 1; 15	MUG; 2 Ret	MNZ; 1 Ret	MNZ; 2 Ret	KYA; 1; 9	KYA; 2; 10							20th	7
2010	Swiss Team	Maserati Quattroporte	MNZ; 1	MNZ; 2	IMO; 1	IMO; 2	ALG; 1 Ret	ALG; 2	HOC; 1; 13	HOC; 2; 12	CPR; 1	CPR; 2	VAL; 1; 19	VAL; 2; 20	KYA; R1	KYA; R2			34th	0
2011	Swiss Team	Maserati Quattroporte	MNZ; 1	MNZ; 2; 3	VNC; 1	VNC; 2	ALG; 1; 9	ALG; 2; 6	DON; 1	DON; 2	MIS; 1	MIS; 2	SPA; 1	SPA; 2	MUG; 1	MUG; 2	VAL; 1	VAL; 2	13th	20
