= 2007 Mil Milhas Brasil =

1000-Mile race

Autódromo José Carlos Pace

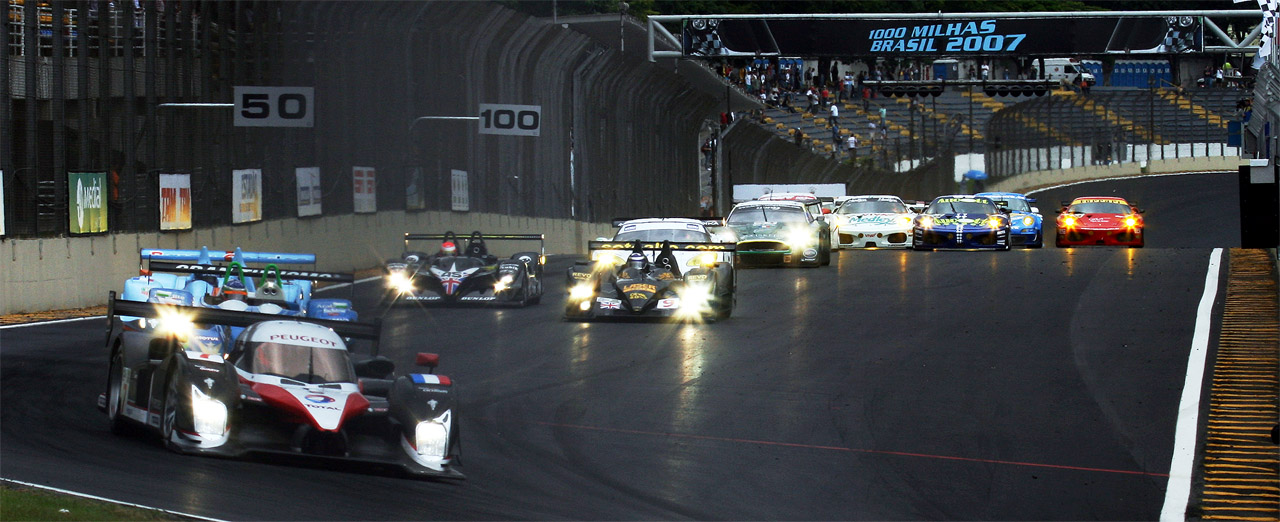
The #7 Peugeot 908 HDi FAP leading the race at the green flag.

The 2007 Mil Milhas Brasil was the 35th running of the Mil Milhas Brasil (1000 Miles of Brasil) and was the sixth and final race of the 2007 Le Mans Series season. It took place at the Autódromo José Carlos Pace, Brazil, on 10 November 2007. It is the first round of the Le Mans Series held outside of Europe, as well as the first event longer than 1000 kilometers. The race lasted 8 hours 58 minutes.

== Official results ==
Class winners in bold. Cars failing to complete 70% of winner's distance marked as Not Classified (NC).

Pos	Class	No	Team	Drivers	Chassis	Tyre	Laps
Pos	Class	No	Team	Drivers	Engine	Tyre	Laps
1	**LMP1**	**7**	**(France) Team Peugeot Total**	**(France) Nicolas Minassian (Spain) Marc Gené**	**Peugeot 908 HDi FAP**	MI	**374**
1	**LMP1**	**7**	**(France) Team Peugeot Total**	**(France) Nicolas Minassian (Spain) Marc Gené**	**Peugeot HDi 5.5L Turbo V12 (Diesel)**	MI	**374**
2	LMP1	8	(France) Team Peugeot Total	(France) Stéphane Sarrazin (Portugal) Pedro Lamy	Peugeot 908 HDi FAP	MI	362
2	LMP1	8	(France) Team Peugeot Total	(France) Stéphane Sarrazin (Portugal) Pedro Lamy	Peugeot HDi 5.5L Turbo V12 (Diesel)	MI	362
3	LMP1	9	(United Kingdom) Creation Autosportif	(United Kingdom) Jamie Campbell-Walter (United Kingdom) Stuart Hall (Switzerland) Felipe Ortiz	Creation CA07	D	358
3	LMP1	9	(United Kingdom) Creation Autosportif	(United Kingdom) Jamie Campbell-Walter (United Kingdom) Stuart Hall (Switzerland) Felipe Ortiz	Judd GV5.5 S2 5.5L V10	D	358
4	LMP1	16	(France) Pescarolo Sport	(France) Emmanuel Collard (France) Jean-Christophe Boullion (Switzerland) Harold Primat	Pescarolo 01	MI	354
4	LMP1	16	(France) Pescarolo Sport	(France) Emmanuel Collard (France) Jean-Christophe Boullion (Switzerland) Harold Primat	Judd GV5.5 S2 5.5L V10	MI	354
5	**LMP2**	**32**	**(France) Barazi-Epsilon**	**(Denmark) Juan Barazi (Netherlands) Michael Vergers (Saudi Arabia) Karim Ojjeh**	**Zytek 07S/2**	MI	**351**
5	**LMP2**	**32**	**(France) Barazi-Epsilon**	**(Denmark) Juan Barazi (Netherlands) Michael Vergers (Saudi Arabia) Karim Ojjeh**	**Zytek ZG348 3.4L V8**	MI	**351**
6	**GT1**	**51**	**(France) Aston Martin Racing Larbre**	**(United Kingdom) Gregor Fisken (Switzerland) Steve Zacchia (France) Roland Bervillé (Brazil) Fernando Rees**	**Aston Martin DBR9**	MI	**329**
6	**GT1**	**51**	**(France) Aston Martin Racing Larbre**	**(United Kingdom) Gregor Fisken (Switzerland) Steve Zacchia (France) Roland Bervillé (Brazil) Fernando Rees**	**Aston Martin 6.0L V12**	MI	**329**
7	**GT2**	**77**	**(Germany) Team Felbermayr-Proton**	**(Germany) Marc Lieb (France) Xavier Pompidou (Germany) Marc Basseng**	**Porsche 997 GT3-RSR**	P	**326**
7	**GT2**	**77**	**(Germany) Team Felbermayr-Proton**	**(Germany) Marc Lieb (France) Xavier Pompidou (Germany) Marc Basseng**	**Porsche 3.8L Flat-6**	P	**326**
8	GT2	75	(Monaco) JMB Racing	(Brazil) Alexandre Negrão, Sr. (Brazil) Alexandre Negrão, Jr. (Brazil) Andreas Mattheis	Ferrari F430GT	D	324
8	GT2	75	(Monaco) JMB Racing	(Brazil) Alexandre Negrão, Sr. (Brazil) Alexandre Negrão, Jr. (Brazil) Andreas Mattheis	Ferrari 4.0L V8	D	324
9	GT2	99	(Monaco) JMB Racing (United Kingdom) Aucott Racing	(United Kingdom) Ben Aucott (United Kingdom) Robert Bell (Austria) Philipp Peter	Ferrari F430GT	D	323
9	GT2	99	(Monaco) JMB Racing (United Kingdom) Aucott Racing	(United Kingdom) Ben Aucott (United Kingdom) Robert Bell (Austria) Philipp Peter	Ferrari 4.0L V8	D	323
10	GT2	85	(Netherlands) Spyker Squadron	(Netherlands) Peter Kox (Netherlands) Mike Hezemans (Netherlands) Paul van Splunteren	Spyker C8 Spyder GT2-R	D	321
10	GT2	85	(Netherlands) Spyker Squadron	(Netherlands) Peter Kox (Netherlands) Mike Hezemans (Netherlands) Paul van Splunteren	Audi 3.8L V8	D	321
11	GT1	72	(France) Luc Alphand Aventures	(Monaco) Olivier Beretta (United Kingdom) Oliver Gavin (France) Patrice Goueslard	Chevrolet Corvette C6.R	MI	320
11	GT1	72	(France) Luc Alphand Aventures	(Monaco) Olivier Beretta (United Kingdom) Oliver Gavin (France) Patrice Goueslard	Chevrolet LS7.R 7.0L V8	MI	320
12	GT2	91	(Brazil) Dener Motorsport (Brazil) Stuttgart Sportscar	(Brazil) Raul Boesel (Brazil) Marcel Visconde (Brazil) Flavio Figueiredo	Porsche 997 GT3-RSR	Y	318
12	GT2	91	(Brazil) Dener Motorsport (Brazil) Stuttgart Sportscar	(Brazil) Raul Boesel (Brazil) Marcel Visconde (Brazil) Flavio Figueiredo	Porsche 3.8L Flat-6	Y	318
13	GT2	74	(Monaco) JMB Racing	(Brazil) Francisco Longo (Brazil) Chico Serra (Brazil) Daniel Serra	Ferrari F430GT	D	318
13	GT2	74	(Monaco) JMB Racing	(Brazil) Francisco Longo (Brazil) Chico Serra (Brazil) Daniel Serra	Ferrari 4.0L V8	D	318
14	GT2	94	(Switzerland) Speedy Racing Team	(Switzerland) Andrea Chiesa (United Kingdom) Jonny Kane (Italy) Andrea Belicchi	Spyker C8 Spyder GT2-R	D	316
14	GT2	94	(Switzerland) Speedy Racing Team	(Switzerland) Andrea Chiesa (United Kingdom) Jonny Kane (Italy) Andrea Belicchi	Audi 3.8L V8	D	316
15	GT2	88	(Germany) Team Felbermayr-Proton	(Germany) Christian Ried (Austria) Horst Felbermayr Jr.	Porsche 997 GT3-RSR	P	302
15	GT2	88	(Germany) Team Felbermayr-Proton	(Germany) Christian Ried (Austria) Horst Felbermayr Jr.	Porsche 3.8L Flat-6	P	302
16	LMP2	45	(United Kingdom) Embassy Racing	(United Kingdom) Warren Hughes (United Kingdom) Darren Manning (Brazil) Mario Haberfeld	Radical SR9	D	278
16	LMP2	45	(United Kingdom) Embassy Racing	(United Kingdom) Warren Hughes (United Kingdom) Darren Manning (Brazil) Mario Haberfeld	Judd XV675 3.4L V8	D	278
17 NC	GT2	79	(Germany) Team Felbermayr-Proton	(Austria) Horst Felbermayr Sr. (Germany) Gerold Ried (Germany) Johannes Stuck	Porsche 911 GT3-RSR	P	235
17 NC	GT2	79	(Germany) Team Felbermayr-Proton	(Austria) Horst Felbermayr Sr. (Germany) Gerold Ried (Germany) Johannes Stuck	Porsche 3.6L Flat-6	P	235
18 DNF	GT2	97	(Italy) G.P.C. Sport	(Italy) Fabrizio de Simone (Italy) Luca Drudi (Italy) Matteo Bobbi (Belgium) Yves Lambert	Ferrari F430GT	D	234
18 DNF	GT2	97	(Italy) G.P.C. Sport	(Italy) Fabrizio de Simone (Italy) Luca Drudi (Italy) Matteo Bobbi (Belgium) Yves Lambert	Ferrari 4.0L V8	D	234
19 NC	GT2	92	(France) Thierry Perrier (France) Perspective Racing	(France) Thierry Perrier (France) Philippe Hesnault (United Kingdom) John Hartshorne (United Kingdom) Rob Barff	Porsche 997 GT3-RSR	D	232
19 NC	GT2	92	(France) Thierry Perrier (France) Perspective Racing	(France) Thierry Perrier (France) Philippe Hesnault (United Kingdom) John Hartshorne (United Kingdom) Rob Barff	Porsche 3.8L Flat-6	D	232
20 DNF	GT2	95	(United Kingdom) James Watt Automotive	(United Kingdom) Richard Westbrook (United Kingdom) Paul Daniels (Australia) Bryce Washington (Denmark) Allan Simonsen	Porsche 997 GT3-RSR	D	228
20 DNF	GT2	95	(United Kingdom) James Watt Automotive	(United Kingdom) Richard Westbrook (United Kingdom) Paul Daniels (Australia) Bryce Washington (Denmark) Allan Simonsen	Porsche 3.8L Flat-6	D	228
21 DNF	GT2	90	(Germany) Farnbacher Racing	(Germany) Pierre Ehret (Germany) Dirk Werner (Denmark) Lars-Erik Nielsen	Porsche 997 GT3-RSR	P	226
21 DNF	GT2	90	(Germany) Farnbacher Racing	(Germany) Pierre Ehret (Germany) Dirk Werner (Denmark) Lars-Erik Nielsen	Porsche 3.8L Flat-6	P	226
22 NC	GT2	89	(Denmark) Team Markland Racing	(Denmark) Kurt Thiim (Denmark) Rene Rasmussen	Chevrolet Corvette Z06	D	212
22 NC	GT2	89	(Denmark) Team Markland Racing	(Denmark) Kurt Thiim (Denmark) Rene Rasmussen	Chevrolet LS7 7.0L V8	D	212
23 DNF	LMP2	20	(France) Pierre Bruneau	(France) Marc Rostan (France) Pierre Bruneau (Brazil) Paulo Bonifácio	Pilbeam MP93	MI	203
23 DNF	LMP2	20	(France) Pierre Bruneau	(France) Marc Rostan (France) Pierre Bruneau (Brazil) Paulo Bonifácio	Judd XV675 3.4L V8	MI	203

== Statistics ==
- Pole position - #7 Team Peugeot Total - 1:41.867
- Fastest lap - #8 Team Peugeot Total - 1:18.787
- Average speed - 179.607 km/h

Le Mans Series
Previous race: 2007 1000km of Silverstone	2007 season	Next race: None
