= Harold Primat =

Swiss racing driver

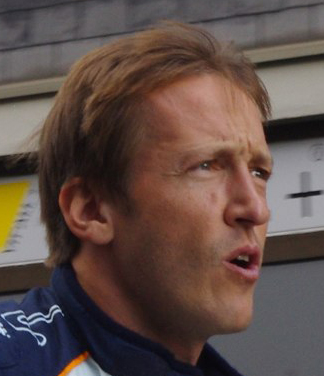
- Primat at the 2011 24 Hours of Le Mans driver parade
- Nationality: (Switzerland) Swiss
- Born: 12 June 1975 (age 51) Neuilly-sur-Seine, France
- Categorisation: FIA Gold (until 2014); FIA Silver (2015)

24 Hours of Le Mans career
- Years: 2005–2012
- Teams: Rollcentre Racing, Swiss Spirit, Pescarolo Sport, Aston Martin Racing
- Best finish: 6th (2010)

Harold Primat (born 12 June 1975) is a French-born Swiss racing driver who previously competed in the Blancpain Endurance Series and other long-distance events such as the Bathurst 12 Hour and Nurburgring 24 Hours.

== Early career ==
The nephew of motorcycle racer Claude Vigreux, Primat began his career in karts before graduating to the Max Mygale and Winfield racing schools in France, as well as the Jim Russell Centre in the UK.

Primat then moved to the US, where he competed in the Formula Ford 2000 championship. He then moved on to the British Formula Three Championship and later the F3 Euroseries, before concluding his single-seater career in World Series Lights with the Saulnier team.

During 2003 and 2004, Primat combined his single-seater races with endurance racing. Debuting in 2003 with the Saulnier team, he competed in the V de V Endurance championship, leading his maiden race at Spa until a mechanical failure put him out of the race. Primat became vice-champion in his second season, narrowly missing out on the title after a prior World Series Lights commitment forced him to skip a race.

== Top-flight endurance racing ==
Moving to the top level of endurance racing with Kruse Motorsport in 2005, Primat qualified third and finished second in class at the 12 Hours of Sebring event. Remaining with Kruse on the other side of the Atlantic, Primat began the European season at Spa but retired due to engine problems. He then switched to Rollcentre Racing, which allowed him to compete for overall honours in the LMP1 category, and went on to achieve three top-ten finishes in his debut year.

2005 also saw Primat make his maiden appearance at the Le Mans 24 Hours. After qualifying in 13th, the Rollcentre Dallara-Nissan suffered technical problems in the early stages of the race, resulting in the team not being classified.

Primat switched teams for 2006, becoming part of an all-Swiss line-up in the new Swiss Spirit outfit, under his former boss Serge Saulnier, whose team ran the programme. Primat won top-three finishes at Spa and Jarama, finishing in joint-fourth place in the championship overall. However, he was again unable to complete the Le Mans 24 Hours after gearbox problems forced him into retirement on lap 132.

Primat again mixed his European schedule with some US-based races in 2006, finishing third at Laguna Seca and fourth at Petit Le Mans for the Creation Autosportif team. However, his debut at the blue riband Daytona 24 Hours was thwarted by an engine failure on his Spirit of Daytona Crawford-Pontiac.

In 2007, Primat signed for Henri Pescarolo's eponymous team. A podium finish at Spa was his best result in the face of increased competition from the works Peugeot squad, but Primat finished in the top-six at four of the six races. The season also saw him finish Le Mans for the first time, finishing sixth in class and 13th overall despite losing 90 minutes in the pits to an oil leak.

Remaining with Pescarolo Sport for the 2008 Le Mans Series, Primat had a top-three finish at Monza, despite the addition of the factory Audi squad to the LMS field. Primat also took a best-yet seventh-place finish at Le Mans, which placed him first among the unofficial 'petrol' class, beaten only by the diesel machines of sportscar heavyweights Audi and Peugeot.

In January 2009, Primat was confirmed as an Aston Martin Racing factory driver for the brand's first return to top-class endurance racing since 1989. Partnering Darren Turner, he finished fourth in the Le Mans Series standings, including a second position at the Nürburgring. Primat was joined by Peter Kox and Stuart Hall for Le Mans, where a water leak curtailed the No. 009 Lola-Aston Martin's involvement after 252 laps. The highlight of Primat's season was victory alongside Stefan Mücke at the inaugural Asian Le Mans Series race at Okayama in late autumn.

2010 saw Primat again driving for Aston Martin Racing, recording three podium finishes in the ALMS and LMS. Sixth place overall at Le Mans itself also represented his best finish at the French race to date. A third season with AMR in 2011, this time alongside Turner and Mücke, produced two more top three finishes for Primat, including an outright ALMS victory at Laguna Seca. Aston Martin's new, open-top AMR-One proved unreliable however, prompting the team to withdraw from the LMP1 ranks at the end of the year.

Primat then moved to privateer LMP1 outfit Rebellion Racing for the newly revived FIA World Endurance Championship in 2012. With Audi and Toyota's factory entries winning all eight rounds between them, it was left to Rebellion to fight for the LMP1 Trophy against Strakka, JRM and OAK Racing. Two victories by Primat - at Silverstone and Shanghai - brought the trophy to Rebellion.

In 2013, Primat swapped sports-prototype for GT machinery as part of Phoenix Racing's Blancpain Endurance Series, VLN and Bathurst 12 Hour driver roster. Piloting an Audi R8 LMS ultra, Primat took fourth place at the Australian classic despite losing four laps to repairs, and achieved the same result at the blue riband 24 Hours of Spa. Racing alongside Oliver Jarvis and Christopher Hasse, the Belgian event saw the trio deliver a comeback drive that ranked among the highlights of the 24 hour contest. Primat also found success on the VLN scene, picking up several top-three finishes.

On 16 September 2015, Primat announced his retirement from racing, ending his seventeen year long career. Primat retired after the final round of the 2015 Blancpain Endurance Series season, at the Nürburgring. He said that "now is the right time to begin a fresh chapter in life by focusing on other projects".

== Post-racing career ==
Since 2016, Primat invested in multiple Startups, amongst others in UK-based companies Playbrush and Busuu as well as Austrian-based Tractive.

== Racing record ==
=== Complete Formula 3 Euro Series results ===
(key)

Year	Entrant	Chassis	Engine	1	2	3	4	5	6	7	8	9	10	11	12	13	14	15	16	17	18	19	20	DC	Points
2003	Saulnier Racing	Dallara F302/021	Sodemo	HOC; 1; 22	HOC; 2; 22	ADR; 1 Ret	ADR; 2; 25	PAU; 1; 18	PAU; 2 Ret	NOR; 1; 15	NOR; 2; 18	LMS; 1; 28†	LMS; 2; 19	NÜR; 1; 21	NÜR; 2; 24†	A1R; 1; 24	A1R; 2; 22	ZAN; 1; 22	ZAN; 2; 22	HOC; 1; 21	HOC; 2 Ret	MAG; 1; 24	MAG; 2 Ret	34th	0

=== Complete 24 Hours of Le Mans results ===
Year	Team	Co-Drivers	Car	Class	Laps	Pos.	Class Pos.
2005	(United Kingdom) Rollcentre Racing	(Germany) Michael Krumm (United Kingdom) Bobby Verdon-Roe	Dallara SP1-Nissan	LMP1	133	DNF	DNF
2006	(Switzerland) Swiss Spirit	(Switzerland) Marcel Fässler (Austria) Philipp Peter	Courage LC70-Judd	LMP1	132	DNF	DNF
2007	(France) Pescarolo Sport	(France) Christophe Tinseau (France) Benoît Tréluyer	Pescarolo 01-Judd	LMP1	325	13th	6th
2008	(France) Pescarolo Sport	(France) Christophe Tinseau (France) Benoît Tréluyer	Pescarolo 01-Judd	LMP1	362	7th	7th
2009	(United Kingdom) Aston Martin Racing	(United Kingdom) Stuart Hall (Netherlands) Peter Kox	Lola-Aston Martin B09/60	LMP1	252	DNF	DNF
2010	(United Kingdom) Aston Martin Racing	(Germany) Stefan Mücke (Mexico) Adrián Fernández	Lola-Aston Martin B09/60	LMP1	365	6th	5th
2011	(United Kingdom) Aston Martin Racing	(Mexico) Adrián Fernández (United Kingdom) Andy Meyrick	Aston Martin AMR-One	LMP1	2	DNF	DNF
2012	(Switzerland) Rebellion Racing	(Italy) Andrea Belicchi (Netherlands) Jeroen Bleekemolen	Lola B12/60-Toyota	LMP1	350	11th	7th

=== Complete Le Mans Series results ===
(key) (Races in bold indicate pole position; races in italics indicate fastest lap)

Year	Entrant	Class	Car	Engine	1	2	3	4	5	6	Pos.	Pts
2005	Kruse Motorsport	LMP2	Courage C65	Judd XV675 3.4L V8	SPA; Ret	MNZ					NC	0
2005	Rollcentre Racing	LMP1	Dallara SP1	Judd GV4 4.0L V10			SIL; Ret	NÜR; 9	IST; 7		24th	2
2006	Swiss Spirit	LMP1	Courage LC70	Judd GV5 5.0L V10	IST; Ret	SPA; 2	NÜR; 6	DON; Ret	JAR; 2		5th	19
2007	Pescarolo Sport	LMP1	Pescarolo 01	Judd GV5.5 S2 5.5L V10	MNZ; 4	VAL; 6	NÜR; Ret	SPA; 3	SIL; Ret	INT; 4	7th	16.5
2008	Pescarolo Sport	LMP1	Pescarolo 01	Judd GV5.5 S2 5.5L V10	CAT; 6	MNZ; 3	SPA; NC	NÜR; 8	SIL; 6		8th	13
2009	Aston Martin Racing	LMP1	Lola-Aston Martin B09/60	Aston Martin AM04 6.0 L V12	CAT; Ret	SPA; 5	ALG; 5	NÜR; 2	SIL; 4		4th	21
2010	Aston Martin Racing	LMP1	Lola-Aston Martin B09/60	Aston Martin AM04 6.0 L V12	CAS; 2	SPA	ALG	HUN	SIL; NC		10th	28
2011	Aston Martin Racing	LMP1	Aston Martin AMR-One	Aston Martin 2.0 L Turbo I6	LEC; NC	SPA	IMO	SIL; 9	EST		NC†	0

^{†} As Primat was a guest driver, he was ineligible for points.

=== Complete FIA World Endurance Championship results ===
Year	Entrant	Class	Chassis	Engine	1	2	3	4	5	6	7	8	Rank	Points
2012	Rebellion Racing	LMP1	Lola B12/60	Toyota RV8KLM 3.4 L V8	SEB; 19	SPA; 5	LMS; 9	SIL; 4	SÃO; 6	BHR; 5	FUJ; 7	SHA; 4	8th	62.5
