= Alessandro Bonetti =

Italian racing driver

- Nationality: (Italy) Italian
- Born: 10 April 1985 (age 41) Trento (Italy)

International GT Open career
- Current team: Racing Team Edil Cris
- Car number: 6

Alessandro Bonetti (born 10 April 1985 in Trento) is an Italian former racing driver. He has competed in such series as International GT Open and the Formula Renault 3.5 Series. He has won races in both the 3000 Pro Series and Le Mans Series.

== Racing record ==
=== Complete Formula Renault 3.5 Series results ===
(key) (Races in bold indicate pole position) (Races in italics indicate fastest lap)

| Year | Team | 1 | 2 | 3 | 4 | 5 | 6 | 7 | 8 | 9 | 10 | 11 | 12 | 13 | 14 | 15 | 16 | 17 | Pos | Points |
|---|---|---|---|---|---|---|---|---|---|---|---|---|---|---|---|---|---|---|---|---|
| 2006 | Jenzer Motorsport | ZOL; 1; 18 | ZOL; 2; 18† | MON; 1; 19 | IST; 1; 16 | IST; 2; 14 | MIS; 1; 19 | MIS; 2 Ret | SPA; 1; 19 | SPA; 2; 20 | NÜR; 1; 19 | NÜR; 2 Ret | DON; 1 | DON; 2 | LMS; 1 | LMS; 2 | CAT; 1 | CAT; 2 | 38th | 0 |

^{†} Driver did not finish the race, but was classified as he completed more than 90% of the race distance.
