= 2008 1000 km of Silverstone =

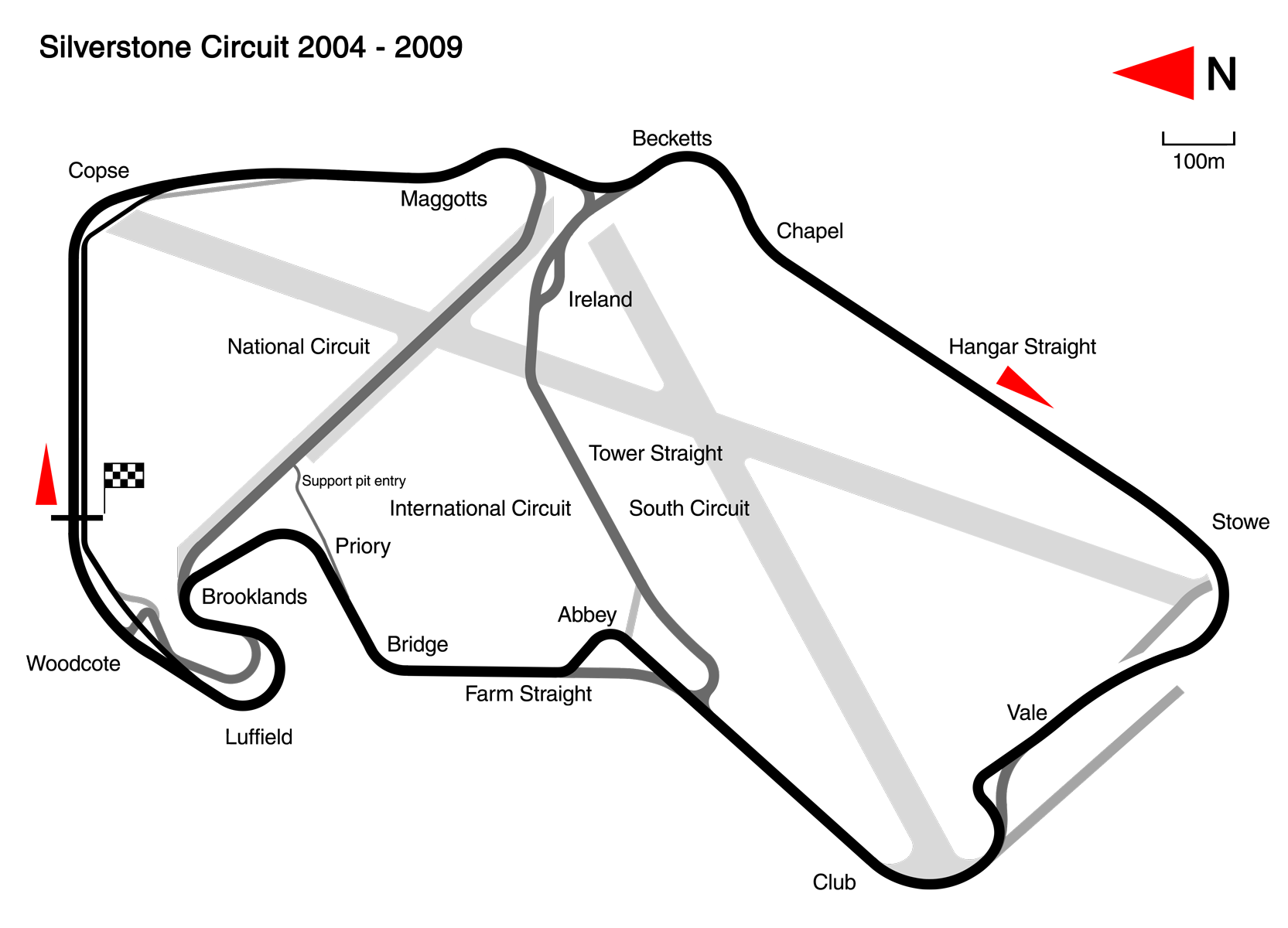
Map of the Silverstone Circuit (2004–2009)

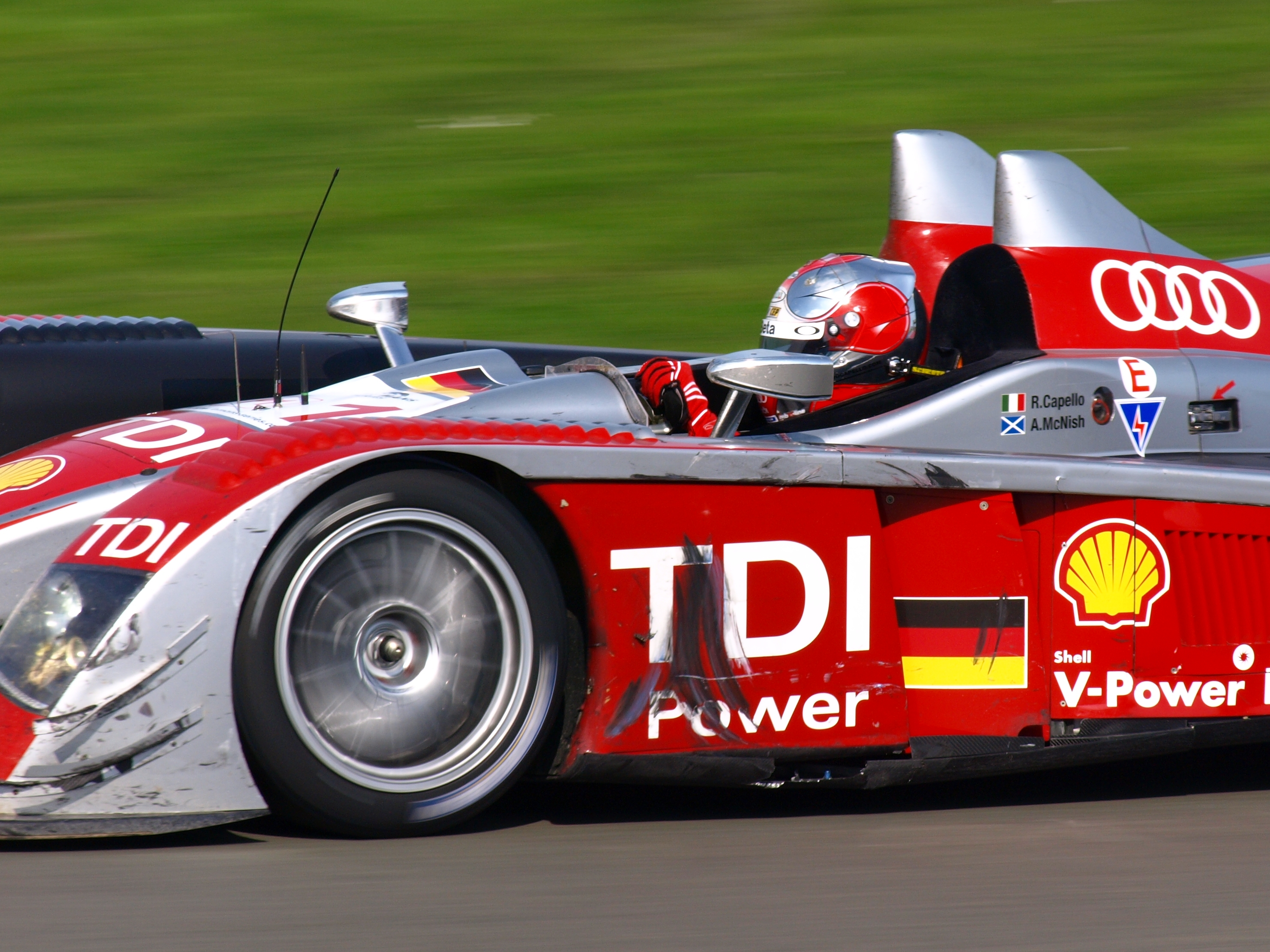
Rinaldo Capello driving the race winning Audi R10 TDI, still showing damage from an earlier accident with the #8 Peugeot

The 2008 Autosport 1000 km of Silverstone was the fifth and final race of the 2008 Le Mans Series season. It took place at the Silverstone Circuit, Great Britain, on 14 September 2008. The race was attended by a record crowd of 53,000 spectators.

Although Audi scored their first and only win of the season, an accident involving the then championship-leading Peugeots allowed Audi to win the Teams, Constructors, and Drivers Championships in the LMP1 category. Luc Alphand's team won the GT1 championship by merely finishing the event, and Virgo Motorsports and driver Rob Bell secured their second consecutive GT2 championship with a class victory.

This was the first time in Le Mans Series history that none of the Peugeot 908s finished in the podium spots as well as in the top eight points positions (#8 finished 19th overall and 11th in LMP1; #7 did not finish at 44th overall and 15th (last) in class), which helped Audi to take the championship. The only other time that the Peugeot 908 did not finish in the podium was in the 12 Hours of Sebring earlier this year, when the lone 908 finished 11th overall and almost finished in the podium at 4th behind the two Audis and an Intersport Lola-AER.

== Race results ==
Class winners in bold. Cars failing to complete 70% of winner's distance marked as Not Classified (NC).

Pos	Class	No	Team	Drivers	Chassis	Tyre	Laps
Pos	Class	No	Team	Drivers	Engine	Tyre	Laps
1	**LMP1**	**1**	**(Germany) Audi Sport Team Joest**	**(United Kingdom) Allan McNish (Italy) Rinaldo Capello**	**Audi R10 TDI**	MI	**195**
1	**LMP1**	**1**	**(Germany) Audi Sport Team Joest**	**(United Kingdom) Allan McNish (Italy) Rinaldo Capello**	**Audi TDI 5.5 L Turbo V12 (Diesel)**	MI	**195**
2	LMP1	10	(Czech Republic) Charouz Racing System	(Czech Republic) Jan Charouz (Germany) Stefan Mücke	Lola B08/60	MI	193
2	LMP1	10	(Czech Republic) Charouz Racing System	(Czech Republic) Jan Charouz (Germany) Stefan Mücke	Aston Martin 6.0 L V12	MI	193
3	LMP1	16	(France) Pescarolo Sport	(France) Romain Dumas (France) Jean-Christophe Boullion	Pescarolo 01	MI	191
3	LMP1	16	(France) Pescarolo Sport	(France) Romain Dumas (France) Jean-Christophe Boullion	Judd GV5.5 S2 5.5 L V10	MI	191
4	LMP1	2	(Germany) Audi Sport Team Joest	(France) Alexandre Prémat (Germany) Mike Rockenfeller	Audi R10 TDI	MI	191
4	LMP1	2	(Germany) Audi Sport Team Joest	(France) Alexandre Prémat (Germany) Mike Rockenfeller	Audi TDI 5.5 L Turbo V12 (Diesel)	MI	191
5	**LMP2**	**34**	**(Netherlands) Van Merksteijn Motorsport (Netherlands) Equipe Verschuur**	**(Netherlands) Peter Van Merksteijn (Netherlands) Jos Verstappen**	**Porsche RS Spyder Evo**	MI	**191**
5	**LMP2**	**34**	**(Netherlands) Van Merksteijn Motorsport (Netherlands) Equipe Verschuur**	**(Netherlands) Peter Van Merksteijn (Netherlands) Jos Verstappen**	**Porsche MR6 3.4 L V8**	MI	**191**
6	LMP1	15	(United Kingdom) Creation AIM	(United Kingdom) Jamie Campbell-Walter (United Kingdom) Stuart Hall	Creation CA07	D	191
6	LMP1	15	(United Kingdom) Creation AIM	(United Kingdom) Jamie Campbell-Walter (United Kingdom) Stuart Hall	AIM (Judd) YS5.5 5.5 L V10	D	191
7	LMP1	17	(France) Pescarolo Sport	(Switzerland) Harold Primat (France) Christophe Tinseau	Pescarolo 01	MI	190
7	LMP1	17	(France) Pescarolo Sport	(Switzerland) Harold Primat (France) Christophe Tinseau	Judd GV5.5 S2 5.5 L V10	MI	190
8	LMP1	5	(France) Team Oreca-Matmut	(France) Soheil Ayari (Monaco) Stéphane Ortelli	Courage-Oreca LC70	MI	189
8	LMP1	5	(France) Team Oreca-Matmut	(France) Soheil Ayari (Monaco) Stéphane Ortelli	Judd GV5.5 S2 5.5 L V10	MI	189
9	LMP2	27	(Switzerland) Horag Racing	(Switzerland) Fredy Lienhard (Belgium) Didier Theys (Netherlands) Jan Lammers	Porsche RS Spyder Evo	MI	187
9	LMP2	27	(Switzerland) Horag Racing	(Switzerland) Fredy Lienhard (Belgium) Didier Theys (Netherlands) Jan Lammers	Porsche MR6 3.4 L V8	MI	187
10	LMP2	40	(Portugal) Quifel ASM Team	(Portugal) Miguel Amaral (France) Olivier Pla	Lola B05/40	D	185
10	LMP2	40	(Portugal) Quifel ASM Team	(Portugal) Miguel Amaral (France) Olivier Pla	AER P07 2.0 L Turbo I4	D	185
11	LMP2	25	(United Kingdom) Ray Mallock Ltd.	(United Kingdom) Mike Newton (Brazil) Thomas Erdos	MG-Lola EX265C	MI	184
11	LMP2	25	(United Kingdom) Ray Mallock Ltd.	(United Kingdom) Mike Newton (Brazil) Thomas Erdos	MG (AER) XP21 2.0 L Turbo I4	MI	184
12	LMP2	31	(Denmark) Team Essex	(Denmark) Casper Elgaard (Denmark) John Nielsen	Porsche RS Spyder Evo	D	184
12	LMP2	31	(Denmark) Team Essex	(Denmark) Casper Elgaard (Denmark) John Nielsen	Porsche MR6 3.4 L V8	D	184
13	LMP2	45	(United Kingdom) Embassy Racing	(United Kingdom) Jonny Kane (United Kingdom) Warren Hughes	Embassy WF01	MI	184
13	LMP2	45	(United Kingdom) Embassy Racing	(United Kingdom) Jonny Kane (United Kingdom) Warren Hughes	Zytek ZG348 3.4 L V8	MI	184
14	LMP1	18	(United Kingdom) Rollcentre Racing	(Portugal) João Barbosa (Belgium) Vanina Ickx (United Kingdom) Charlie Hollings	Pescarolo 01	D	183
14	LMP1	18	(United Kingdom) Rollcentre Racing	(Portugal) João Barbosa (Belgium) Vanina Ickx (United Kingdom) Charlie Hollings	Judd GV5.5 S2 5.5 L V10	D	183
15	LMP2	41	(Switzerland) Trading Performance	(Saudi Arabia) Karim Ojjeh (France) Claude-Yves Gosselin (United Kingdom) Adam Sharpe	Zytek 07S/2	MI	183
15	LMP2	41	(Switzerland) Trading Performance	(Saudi Arabia) Karim Ojjeh (France) Claude-Yves Gosselin (United Kingdom) Adam Sharpe	Zytek ZG348 3.4 L V8	MI	183
16	LMP1	4	(France) Saulnier Racing	(France) Jacques Nicolet (Monaco) Richard Hein	Pescarolo 01	MI	183
16	LMP1	4	(France) Saulnier Racing	(France) Jacques Nicolet (Monaco) Richard Hein	Judd GV5.5 S2 5.5 L V10	MI	183
17	LMP1	6	(France) Team Oreca-Matmut	(France) Olivier Panis (France) Nicolas Lapierre	Courage-Oreca LC70	MI	183
17	LMP1	6	(France) Team Oreca-Matmut	(France) Olivier Panis (France) Nicolas Lapierre	Judd GV5.5 S2 5.5 L V10	MI	183
18	LMP2	44	(Germany) Kruse Schiller Motorsport	(France) Jean de Pourtalès (Japan) Hideki Noda	Lola B05/40	D	182
18	LMP2	44	(Germany) Kruse Schiller Motorsport	(France) Jean de Pourtalès (Japan) Hideki Noda	Mazda MZR-R 2.0 L Turbo I4	D	182
19	LMP1	8	(France) Team Peugeot Total	(France) Stéphane Sarrazin (Portugal) Pedro Lamy	Peugeot 908 HDi FAP	MI	182
19	LMP1	8	(France) Team Peugeot Total	(France) Stéphane Sarrazin (Portugal) Pedro Lamy	Peugeot HDi 5.5 L Turbo V12 (Diesel)	MI	182
20	**GT1**	**59**	**(United Kingdom) Team Modena**	**(Czech Republic) Tomáš Enge (Spain) Antonio García**	**Aston Martin DBR9**	MI	**178**
20	**GT1**	**59**	**(United Kingdom) Team Modena**	**(Czech Republic) Tomáš Enge (Spain) Antonio García**	**Aston Martin 6.0 L V12**	MI	**178**
21	GT1	55	(Russia) IPB Spartak Racing (Germany) Reiter Engineering	(Netherlands) Peter Kox (Russia) Roman Rusinov	Lamborghini Murciélago R-GT	MI	177
21	GT1	55	(Russia) IPB Spartak Racing (Germany) Reiter Engineering	(Netherlands) Peter Kox (Russia) Roman Rusinov	Lamborghini L535 6.0 L V12	MI	177
22	GT1	72	(France) Luc Alphand Aventures	(France) Guillaume Moreau (France) Patrice Goueslard	Chevrolet Corvette C6.R	MI	174
22	GT1	72	(France) Luc Alphand Aventures	(France) Guillaume Moreau (France) Patrice Goueslard	Chevrolet LS7-R 7.0 L V8	MI	174
23	LMP2	35	(France) Saulnier Racing	(France) Pierre Ragues (France) Matthieu Lahaye	Pescarolo 01	MI	174
23	LMP2	35	(France) Saulnier Racing	(France) Pierre Ragues (France) Matthieu Lahaye	Judd DB 3.4 L V8	MI	174
24	GT1	61	(United Kingdom) Strakka Racing	(United Kingdom) Nick Leventis (United Kingdom) Peter Hardman (United Kingdom) Darren Turner	Aston Martin DBR9	D	173
24	GT1	61	(United Kingdom) Strakka Racing	(United Kingdom) Nick Leventis (United Kingdom) Peter Hardman (United Kingdom) Darren Turner	Aston Martin 6.0 L V12	D	173
25	LMP1	21	(Spain) Epsilon Euskadi	(Spain) Adrián Vallés (Japan) Shinji Nakano	Epsilon Euskadi ee1	MI	172
25	LMP1	21	(Spain) Epsilon Euskadi	(Spain) Adrián Vallés (Japan) Shinji Nakano	Judd GV5.5 S2 5.5 L V10	MI	172
26	**GT2**	**96**	**(United Kingdom) Virgo Motorsport**	**(United Kingdom) Rob Bell (Brazil) Jaime Melo**	**Ferrari F430GT**	D	**172**
26	**GT2**	**96**	**(United Kingdom) Virgo Motorsport**	**(United Kingdom) Rob Bell (Brazil) Jaime Melo**	**Ferrari 4.0 L V8**	D	**172**
27	GT2	77	(Germany) Team Felbermayr-Proton	(Germany) Marc Lieb (Australia) Alex Davison	Porsche 997 GT3-RSR	MI	171
27	GT2	77	(Germany) Team Felbermayr-Proton	(Germany) Marc Lieb (Australia) Alex Davison	Porsche 4.0 L Flat-6	MI	171
28	GT2	90	(Germany) Farnbacher Racing	(Germany) Pierre Ehret (Germany) Pierre Kaffer (France) Anthony Beltoise	Ferrari F430GT	MI	169
28	GT2	90	(Germany) Farnbacher Racing	(Germany) Pierre Ehret (Germany) Pierre Kaffer (France) Anthony Beltoise	Ferrari 4.0 L V8	MI	169
29	GT2	85	(Netherlands) Snoras Spyker Squadron	(Netherlands) Tom Coronel (Germany) Ralf Kelleners (Russia) Alexey Vasilyev	Spyker C8 Laviolette GT2-R	MI	168
29	GT2	85	(Netherlands) Snoras Spyker Squadron	(Netherlands) Tom Coronel (Germany) Ralf Kelleners (Russia) Alexey Vasilyev	Audi 4.0 L V8	MI	168
30	GT2	88	(Germany) Team Felbermayr-Proton	(Austria) Horst Felbermayr, Sr. (Austria) Horst Felbermayr, Jr. (Germany) Christian Ried	Porsche 997 GT3-RSR	MI	162
30	GT2	88	(Germany) Team Felbermayr-Proton	(Austria) Horst Felbermayr, Sr. (Austria) Horst Felbermayr, Jr. (Germany) Christian Ried	Porsche 4.0 L Flat-6	MI	162
31	GT2	98	(Monaco) JMB Racing	(Switzerland) Maurice Basso (Netherlands) Peter Kutemann (France) Julien Gilbert	Ferrari F430GT	MI	160
31	GT2	98	(Monaco) JMB Racing	(Switzerland) Maurice Basso (Netherlands) Peter Kutemann (France) Julien Gilbert	Ferrari 4.0 L V8	MI	160
32	LMP2	26	(United Kingdom) Team Bruichladdich Radical	(Germany) Jens Petersen (Germany) Jan-Dirk Lueders (France) Marc Rostan	Radical SR9	D	160
32	LMP2	26	(United Kingdom) Team Bruichladdich Radical	(Germany) Jens Petersen (Germany) Jan-Dirk Lueders (France) Marc Rostan	AER P07 2.0 L Turbo I4	D	160
33	GT2	93	(United Kingdom) James Watt Automotive	(South Africa) Alan van der Merwe (United Kingdom) Tim Sugden (Denmark) Michael Outzen	Aston Martin V8 Vantage GT2	D	159
33	GT2	93	(United Kingdom) James Watt Automotive	(South Africa) Alan van der Merwe (United Kingdom) Tim Sugden (Denmark) Michael Outzen	Aston Martin 4.5 L V8	D	159
34	GT2	94	(Switzerland) Speedy Racing Team	(Switzerland) Andrea Chiesa (Switzerland) Benjamin Leuenberger	Spyker C8 Laviolette GT2-R	MI	158
34	GT2	94	(Switzerland) Speedy Racing Team	(Switzerland) Andrea Chiesa (Switzerland) Benjamin Leuenberger	Audi 4.0 L V8	MI	158
35	LMP2	46	(United Kingdom) Embassy Racing	(United Kingdom) Darren Manning (United Kingdom) Joey Foster	Embassy WF01	MI	156
35	LMP2	46	(United Kingdom) Embassy Racing	(United Kingdom) Darren Manning (United Kingdom) Joey Foster	Zytek ZG348 3.4 L V8	MI	156
36	GT2	99	(Monaco) JMB Racing (United Kingdom) Aucott Racing	(United Kingdom) Ben Aucott (France) Stéphane Daoudi	Ferrari F430GT	MI	145
36	GT2	99	(Monaco) JMB Racing (United Kingdom) Aucott Racing	(United Kingdom) Ben Aucott (France) Stéphane Daoudi	Ferrari 4.0 L V8	MI	145
37 DNF	LMP2	32	(France) Barazi-Epsilon	(Denmark) Juan Barazi (Netherlands) Michael Vergers (Brazil) Fernando Rees	Zytek 07S/2	MI	162
37 DNF	LMP2	32	(France) Barazi-Epsilon	(Denmark) Juan Barazi (Netherlands) Michael Vergers (Brazil) Fernando Rees	Zytek ZG348 3.4 L V8	MI	162
38 DNF	GT2	75	(France) IMSA Performance Matmut	(France) Richard Balandras (France) Michel Lecourt	Porsche 997 GT3-RSR	MI	91
38 DNF	GT2	75	(France) IMSA Performance Matmut	(France) Richard Balandras (France) Michel Lecourt	Porsche 4.0 L Flat-6	MI	91
39 DNF	LMP1	14	(United Kingdom) Creation AIM	(United Kingdom) Ryan Lewis (South Africa) Stephen Simpson	Creation CA07	D	89
39 DNF	LMP1	14	(United Kingdom) Creation AIM	(United Kingdom) Ryan Lewis (South Africa) Stephen Simpson	AIM (Judd) YS5.5 5.5 L V10	D	89
40 DNF	LMP2	33	(Switzerland) Speedy Racing Team (United Kingdom) Sebah Automotive	(Italy) Andrea Belicchi (France) Xavier Pompidou (Switzerland) Steve Zacchia	Lola B08/80	MI	75
40 DNF	LMP2	33	(Switzerland) Speedy Racing Team (United Kingdom) Sebah Automotive	(Italy) Andrea Belicchi (France) Xavier Pompidou (Switzerland) Steve Zacchia	Judd DB 3.4 L V8	MI	75
41 DNF	LMP1	20	(Spain) Epsilon Euskadi	(Spain) Ángel Burgueño (Spain) Miguel Ángel de Castro	Epsilon Euskadi ee1	MI	59
41 DNF	LMP1	20	(Spain) Epsilon Euskadi	(Spain) Ángel Burgueño (Spain) Miguel Ángel de Castro	Judd GV5.5 S2 5.5 L V10	MI	59
42 DNF	GT2	95	(United Kingdom) James Watt Automotive	(United Kingdom) Peter Bamford (United Kingdom) Paul Daniels (Republic of Ireland) Matt Griffin	Porsche 997 GT3-RSR	D	55
42 DNF	GT2	95	(United Kingdom) James Watt Automotive	(United Kingdom) Peter Bamford (United Kingdom) Paul Daniels (Republic of Ireland) Matt Griffin	Porsche 3.8 L Flat-6	D	55
43 DNF	GT2	91	(Germany) Farnbacher Racing	(Denmark) Lars-Erik Nielsen (Germany) Dirk Werner	Porsche 997 GT3-RSR	MI	51
43 DNF	GT2	91	(Germany) Farnbacher Racing	(Denmark) Lars-Erik Nielsen (Germany) Dirk Werner	Porsche 4.0 L Flat-6	MI	51
44 DNF	LMP1	7	(France) Team Peugeot Total	(France) Nicolas Minassian (Spain) Marc Gené	Peugeot 908 HDi FAP	MI	45
44 DNF	LMP1	7	(France) Team Peugeot Total	(France) Nicolas Minassian (Spain) Marc Gené	Peugeot HDi 5.5 L Turbo V12 (Diesel)	MI	45
45 DNF	GT2	76	(France) IMSA Performance Matmut	(France) Raymond Narac (Austria) Richard Lietz	Porsche 997 GT3-RSR	MI	38
45 DNF	GT2	76	(France) IMSA Performance Matmut	(France) Raymond Narac (Austria) Richard Lietz	Porsche 4.0 L Flat-6	MI	38
46 DNF	LMP2	37	(France) WR Salini	(France) Stéphane Salini (France) Philippe Salini (France) Tristan Gommendy	WR LMP2008	D	3
46 DNF	LMP2	37	(France) WR Salini	(France) Stéphane Salini (France) Philippe Salini (France) Tristan Gommendy	Zytek ZG348 3.4 L V8	D	3

== Statistics ==
- Pole Position - #8 Team Peugeot Total - 1:30.359
- Fastest Lap - #8 Team Peugeot Total - 1:31.166
- Average Speed - 176.696 km/h (109.794 mph)

Le Mans Series
Previous race: 2008 1000km of Nürburgring	2008 season	Next race: None
