= 2008 Le Mans Series =

Motorsport season

Seasons
- ← 2007 2009 →

The 2008 Le Mans Series was the fifth season of ACO's Le Mans Series. It was a series for Le Mans Prototype and Grand Touring style cars broken into 4 classes: LMP1, LMP2, GT1, and GT2. It ran from 6 April to 14 September 2008 with five rounds taking place.

== Schedule ==
The 2008 schedule remained largely unchanged from that of 2007, except for Circuit de Catalunya replacing Circuit de Valencia for the Spanish round. A large gap was built into the schedule between May and August to better allow teams to prepare for and recover from the 2008 24 Hours of Le Mans.

An additional race was announced at a later date, with a 1000 km event in Shanghai. This event however would not replace the Mil Milhas Brasil round, but was instead to be a stand-alone event as a precursor to a new Asian Le Mans Series planned for 2009. Points for the Le Mans Series would not be awarded but class winners would gain automatic entry to the 2009 24 Hours of Le Mans. The race was cancelled and was later rescheduled be held on 8 November 2009, because of conflicts with the 2008 Summer Olympics schedule.

Rnd	Race	Circuit	Date
-	(France) LMS Official Test	Paul Ricard HTTT	2 March; 3 March
1	(Spain) 1000 km of Catalunya	Circuit de Catalunya	6 April
2	(Italy) 1000 km of Monza	Autodromo Nazionale di Monza	27 April
3	(Belgium) 1000 km of Spa	Circuit de Spa-Francorchamps	11 May
4	(Germany) 1000 km of Nürburgring	Nürburgring	17 August
5	(United Kingdom) 1000 km of Silverstone	Silverstone Circuit	14 September

== Teams and drivers ==
=== LMP1 ===
Team	Chassis	Engine	No.	Drivers	Rounds
(Germany) Audi Sport Team Joest	Audi R10 TDI	Audi TDI 5.5 L Turbo V12 (Diesel)	1	(Italy) Rinaldo Capello	All
(Germany) Audi Sport Team Joest	Audi R10 TDI	Audi TDI 5.5 L Turbo V12 (Diesel)	1	(United Kingdom) Allan McNish	All
(Germany) Audi Sport Team Joest	Audi R10 TDI	Audi TDI 5.5 L Turbo V12 (Diesel)	2	(France) Alexandre Prémat	All
(Germany) Audi Sport Team Joest	Audi R10 TDI	Audi TDI 5.5 L Turbo V12 (Diesel)	2	(Germany) Mike Rockenfeller	All
(Monaco) Scuderia Lavaggi	Lavaggi LS1	AER P32C 4.0 L Turbo V8	3	(Germany) Wolfgang Kaufmann	1, 3–4
(Monaco) Scuderia Lavaggi	Lavaggi LS1	AER P32C 4.0 L Turbo V8	3	(Monaco) Giovanni Lavaggi	1, 3–4
(France) Saulnier Racing	Pescarolo 01	Judd GV5.5 S2 5.5 L V10	4	(Monaco) Richard Hein	All
(France) Saulnier Racing	Pescarolo 01	Judd GV5.5 S2 5.5 L V10	4	(France) Jacques Nicolet	All
(France) Saulnier Racing	Pescarolo 01	Judd GV5.5 S2 5.5 L V10	4	(Monaco) Marc Faggionato	1–3
(France) Team Oreca-Matmut	Courage-Oreca LC70	Judd GV5.5 S2 5.5 L V10	5	(France) Soheil Ayari	1–2, 4–5
(France) Team Oreca-Matmut	Courage-Oreca LC70	Judd GV5.5 S2 5.5 L V10	5	(Monaco) Stéphane Ortelli	1–2, 4–5
(France) Team Oreca-Matmut	Courage-Oreca LC70	Judd GV5.5 S2 5.5 L V10	5	(France) Loïc Duval	4
(France) Team Oreca-Matmut	Courage-Oreca LC70	Judd GV5.5 S2 5.5 L V10	6	(France) Nicolas Lapierre	All
(France) Team Oreca-Matmut	Courage-Oreca LC70	Judd GV5.5 S2 5.5 L V10	6	(France) Olivier Panis	All
(France) Team Peugeot Total	Peugeot 908 HDi FAP	Peugeot HDi 5.5 L Turbo V12 (Diesel)	7	(Spain) Marc Gené	All
(France) Team Peugeot Total	Peugeot 908 HDi FAP	Peugeot HDi 5.5 L Turbo V12 (Diesel)	7	(France) Nicolas Minassian	All
(France) Team Peugeot Total	Peugeot 908 HDi FAP	Peugeot HDi 5.5 L Turbo V12 (Diesel)	7	(Canada) Jacques Villeneuve	3
(France) Team Peugeot Total	Peugeot 908 HDi FAP	Peugeot HDi 5.5 L Turbo V12 (Diesel)	8	(Portugal) Pedro Lamy	All
(France) Team Peugeot Total	Peugeot 908 HDi FAP	Peugeot HDi 5.5 L Turbo V12 (Diesel)	8	(France) Stéphane Sarrazin	All
(France) Team Peugeot Total	Peugeot 908 HDi FAP	Peugeot HDi 5.5 L Turbo V12 (Diesel)	8	(Austria) Alexander Wurz	3
(Czech Republic) Charouz Racing System	Lola B08/60	Aston Martin AM04 6.0 L V12	10	(Czech Republic) Jan Charouz	All
(Czech Republic) Charouz Racing System	Lola B08/60	Aston Martin AM04 6.0 L V12	10	(Germany) Stefan Mücke	All
(United Kingdom) Creation Autosportif	Creation CA07	AIM (Judd) YS5.5 5.5 L V10	14	(United Kingdom) Jamie Campbell-Walter	1–2
(United Kingdom) Creation Autosportif	Creation CA07	AIM (Judd) YS5.5 5.5 L V10	14	(South Africa) Stephen Simpson	4–5
(United Kingdom) Creation Autosportif	Creation CA07	AIM (Judd) YS5.5 5.5 L V10	14	(Switzerland) Felipe Ortiz	1
(United Kingdom) Creation Autosportif	Creation CA07	AIM (Judd) YS5.5 5.5 L V10	14	(United Kingdom) Stuart Hall	2
(United Kingdom) Creation Autosportif	Creation CA07	AIM (Judd) YS5.5 5.5 L V10	14	(United States) Liz Halliday	4
(United Kingdom) Creation Autosportif	Creation CA07	AIM (Judd) YS5.5 5.5 L V10	14	(United Kingdom) Ryan Lewis	5
(United Kingdom) Creation Autosportif	Creation CA07	AIM (Judd) YS5.5 5.5 L V10	15	(United Kingdom) Stuart Hall	All
(United Kingdom) Creation Autosportif	Creation CA07	AIM (Judd) YS5.5 5.5 L V10	15	(United Kingdom) Robbie Kerr	2–3
(United Kingdom) Creation Autosportif	Creation CA07	AIM (Judd) YS5.5 5.5 L V10	15	(United Kingdom) Jamie Campbell-Walter	4–5
(United Kingdom) Creation Autosportif	Creation CA07	AIM (Judd) YS5.5 5.5 L V10	15	(France) Simon Pagenaud	1
(United Kingdom) Creation Autosportif	Creation CA07	AIM (Judd) YS5.5 5.5 L V10	15	(France) Bruce Jouanny	2
(France) Pescarolo Sport	Pescarolo 01	Judd GV5.5 S2 5.5 L V10	16	(France) Jean-Christophe Boullion	All
(France) Pescarolo Sport	Pescarolo 01	Judd GV5.5 S2 5.5 L V10	16	(France) Emmanuel Collard	1–4
(France) Pescarolo Sport	Pescarolo 01	Judd GV5.5 S2 5.5 L V10	16	(France) Romain Dumas	5
(France) Pescarolo Sport	Pescarolo 01	Judd GV5.5 S2 5.5 L V10	17	(Switzerland) Harold Primat	All
(France) Pescarolo Sport	Pescarolo 01	Judd GV5.5 S2 5.5 L V10	17	(France) Christophe Tinseau	All
(United Kingdom) Rollcentre Racing	Pescarolo 01	Judd GV5.5 S2 5.5 L V10	18	(Belgium) Vanina Ickx	All
(United Kingdom) Rollcentre Racing	Pescarolo 01	Judd GV5.5 S2 5.5 L V10	18	(Portugal) João Barbosa	1, 3–5
(United Kingdom) Rollcentre Racing	Pescarolo 01	Judd GV5.5 S2 5.5 L V10	18	(United Kingdom) Martin Short	1–2
(United Kingdom) Rollcentre Racing	Pescarolo 01	Judd GV5.5 S2 5.5 L V10	18	(United Kingdom) Duncan Tappy	2
(United Kingdom) Rollcentre Racing	Pescarolo 01	Judd GV5.5 S2 5.5 L V10	18	(Finland) Mikael Forsten	3
(United Kingdom) Rollcentre Racing	Pescarolo 01	Judd GV5.5 S2 5.5 L V10	18	(United Kingdom) Charlie Hollings	5
(United Kingdom) Chamberlain-Synergy Motorsport	Lola B06/10	AER P32C 4.0 L Turbo V8	19	(United Kingdom) Bob Berridge	1
(United Kingdom) Chamberlain-Synergy Motorsport	Lola B06/10	AER P32C 4.0 L Turbo V8	19	(United Kingdom) Gareth Evans	1
(Spain) Epsilon Euskadi	Epsilon Euskadi EE1	Judd GV5.5 S2 5.5 L V10	20	(Spain) Angel Burgueño	All
(Spain) Epsilon Euskadi	Epsilon Euskadi EE1	Judd GV5.5 S2 5.5 L V10	20	(Spain) Miguel Ángel de Castro	All
(Spain) Epsilon Euskadi	Epsilon Euskadi EE1	Judd GV5.5 S2 5.5 L V10	21	(Japan) Shinji Nakano	4–5
(Spain) Epsilon Euskadi	Epsilon Euskadi EE1	Judd GV5.5 S2 5.5 L V10	21	(Spain) Adrián Vallés	4–5

=== LMP2 ===
Team	Chassis	Engine	No.	Drivers	Rounds
(United Kingdom) Ray Mallock Ltd.	MG-Lola EX265 4 MG-Lola EX265C 1	MG (AER) XP21 2.0 L Turbo I4	25	(Brazil) Thomas Erdos	All
(United Kingdom) Ray Mallock Ltd.	MG-Lola EX265 4 MG-Lola EX265C 1	MG (AER) XP21 2.0 L Turbo I4	25	(United Kingdom) Mike Newton	All
(United Kingdom) Team Bruichladdich Radical	Radical SR9	AER P07 2.0 L Turbo I4	26	(Germany) Jan-Dirk Lueders	All
(United Kingdom) Team Bruichladdich Radical	Radical SR9	AER P07 2.0 L Turbo I4	26	(France) Marc Rostan	All
(United Kingdom) Team Bruichladdich Radical	Radical SR9	AER P07 2.0 L Turbo I4	26	(Germany) Jens Petersen	All
(Switzerland) Horag Racing	Porsche RS Spyder Evo	Porsche MR6 3.4 L V8	27	(Netherlands) Jan Lammers	All
(Switzerland) Horag Racing	Porsche RS Spyder Evo	Porsche MR6 3.4 L V8	27	(Switzerland) Fredy Lienhard	All
(Switzerland) Horag Racing	Porsche RS Spyder Evo	Porsche MR6 3.4 L V8	27	(Belgium) Didier Theys	All
(Italy) Racing Box	Lucchini LMP2/08	Judd XV675 3.4 L V8	30	(Italy) Marco Didaio	1–2
(Italy) Racing Box	Lucchini LMP2/08	Judd XV675 3.4 L V8	30	(Italy) Filippo Francioni	1–2
(Denmark) Team Essex	Porsche RS Spyder Evo	Porsche MR6 3.4 L V8	31	(Denmark) Casper Elgaard	All
(Denmark) Team Essex	Porsche RS Spyder Evo	Porsche MR6 3.4 L V8	31	(Denmark) John Nielsen	All
(France) Barazi-Epsilon	Zytek 07S/2	Zytek ZG348 3.4 L V8	32	(Denmark) Juan Barazi	All
(France) Barazi-Epsilon	Zytek 07S/2	Zytek ZG348 3.4 L V8	32	(Netherlands) Michael Vergers	All
(France) Barazi-Epsilon	Zytek 07S/2	Zytek ZG348 3.4 L V8	32	(Brazil) Fernando Rees	2–5
(Switzerland) Speedy Racing Team (United Kingdom) Sebah Automotive	Lola B08/80	Judd DB 3.4 L V8	33	(Italy) Andrea Belicchi	All
(Switzerland) Speedy Racing Team (United Kingdom) Sebah Automotive	Lola B08/80	Judd DB 3.4 L V8	33	(France) Xavier Pompidou	All
(Switzerland) Speedy Racing Team (United Kingdom) Sebah Automotive	Lola B08/80	Judd DB 3.4 L V8	33	(Switzerland) Steve Zacchia	All
(Netherlands) Van Merksteijn Motorsport (Netherlands) Equipe Verschuur	Porsche RS Spyder Evo	Porsche MR6 3.4 L V8	34	(Netherlands) Jos Verstappen	All
(Netherlands) Van Merksteijn Motorsport (Netherlands) Equipe Verschuur	Porsche RS Spyder Evo	Porsche MR6 3.4 L V8	34	(Netherlands) Peter van Merksteijn Sr.	1–3, 5
(Netherlands) Van Merksteijn Motorsport (Netherlands) Equipe Verschuur	Porsche RS Spyder Evo	Porsche MR6 3.4 L V8	34	(Netherlands) Jeroen Bleekemolen	4
(France) Saulnier Racing	Pescarolo 01	Judd DB 3.4 L V8	35	(France) Matthieu Lahaye	All
(France) Saulnier Racing	Pescarolo 01	Judd DB 3.4 L V8	35	(France) Pierre Ragues	All
(France) WR Salini	WR LMP2008	Zytek ZG348 3.4 L V8	37	(France) Stéphane Salini	All
(France) WR Salini	WR LMP2008	Zytek ZG348 3.4 L V8	37	(France) Philippe Salini	All
(France) WR Salini	WR LMP2008	Zytek ZG348 3.4 L V8	37	(France) Patrice Roussel	1–4
(France) WR Salini	WR LMP2008	Zytek ZG348 3.4 L V8	37	(France) Tristan Gommendy	5
(Portugal) Quifel ASM Team	Lola B05/40	Judd DB 3.4 L V8	40	(Portugal) Miguel Amaral	All
(Portugal) Quifel ASM Team	Lola B05/40	Judd DB 3.4 L V8	40	(France) Olivier Pla	All
(Switzerland) Trading Performance	Zytek 07S/2	Zytek ZG348 3.4 L V8	41	(France) Claude-Yves Gosselin	All
(Switzerland) Trading Performance	Zytek 07S/2	Zytek ZG348 3.4 L V8	41	(Saudi Arabia) Karim Ojjeh	All
(Switzerland) Trading Performance	Zytek 07S/2	Zytek ZG348 3.4 L V8	41	(Belgium) Julien Schroyen	1–3
(Switzerland) Trading Performance	Zytek 07S/2	Zytek ZG348 3.4 L V8	41	(United Kingdom) Adam Sharpe	5
(Germany) Kruse Schiller Motorsport	Lola B05/40	Mazda MZR-R 2.0 L Turbo I4	44	(Japan) Hideki Noda	All
(Germany) Kruse Schiller Motorsport	Lola B05/40	Mazda MZR-R 2.0 L Turbo I4	44	(France) Jean de Pourtales	All
(United Kingdom) Embassy Racing	Embassy WF01	Zytek ZG348 3.4 L V8	45	(United Kingdom) Warren Hughes	All
(United Kingdom) Embassy Racing	Embassy WF01	Zytek ZG348 3.4 L V8	45	(United Kingdom) Jonny Kane	3–5
(United Kingdom) Embassy Racing	Embassy WF01	Zytek ZG348 3.4 L V8	45	(Brazil) Mário Haberfeld	1–2
(United Kingdom) Embassy Racing	Embassy WF01	Zytek ZG348 3.4 L V8	46	(United Kingdom) Joey Foster	All
(United Kingdom) Embassy Racing	Embassy WF01	Zytek ZG348 3.4 L V8	46	(United Kingdom) Jonny Kane	1–2
(United Kingdom) Embassy Racing	Embassy WF01	Zytek ZG348 3.4 L V8	46	(United Kingdom) Darren Manning	4–5
(United Kingdom) Embassy Racing	Embassy WF01	Zytek ZG348 3.4 L V8	46	(United Kingdom) Tom Kimber-Smith	3

=== GT1 ===
Team	Chassis	Engine	No.	Drivers	Rounds
(France) Larbre Compétition	Saleen S7-R	Ford Windsor 7.0 L V8	50	(France) Patrick Bornhauser	1
(France) Larbre Compétition	Saleen S7-R	Ford Windsor 7.0 L V8	50	(France) Christophe Bouchut	1
(France) Larbre Compétition	Saleen S7-R	Ford Windsor 7.0 L V8	50	(France) Frédéric Makowiecki	1
(Russia) IPB Spartak Racing (Germany) Reiter Engineering	Lamborghini Murciélago R-GT	Lamborghini L535 6.0 L V12	55	(Netherlands) Peter Kox	All
(Russia) IPB Spartak Racing (Germany) Reiter Engineering	Lamborghini Murciélago R-GT	Lamborghini L535 6.0 L V12	55	(Russia) Roman Rusinov	All
(United Kingdom) Team Modena	Aston Martin DBR9	Aston Martin AM04 6.0 L V12	59	(Czech Republic) Tomáš Enge	All
(United Kingdom) Team Modena	Aston Martin DBR9	Aston Martin AM04 6.0 L V12	59	(Spain) Antonio García	All
(United Kingdom) Strakka Racing	Aston Martin DBR9	Aston Martin AM04 6.0 L V12	61	(United Kingdom) Peter Hardman	3, 5
(United Kingdom) Strakka Racing	Aston Martin DBR9	Aston Martin AM04 6.0 L V12	61	(United Kingdom) Nick Leventis	3, 5
(United Kingdom) Strakka Racing	Aston Martin DBR9	Aston Martin AM04 6.0 L V12	61	(United Kingdom) Darren Turner	5
(France) Luc Alphand Aventures	Chevrolet Corvette C6.R	Chevrolet LS7.R 7.0 L V8	72	(France) Patrice Goueslard	All
(France) Luc Alphand Aventures	Chevrolet Corvette C6.R	Chevrolet LS7.R 7.0 L V8	72	(France) Guillaume Moreau	All
(France) Luc Alphand Aventures	Chevrolet Corvette C6.R	Chevrolet LS7.R 7.0 L V8	72	(Monaco) Olivier Beretta	2–3
(France) Luc Alphand Aventures	Chevrolet Corvette C6.R	Chevrolet LS7.R 7.0 L V8	72	(France) Luc Alphand	1, 4
(France) Luc Alphand Aventures	Chevrolet Corvette C6.R	Chevrolet LS7.R 7.0 L V8	73	(France) Jean-Luc Blanchemain	1–3
(France) Luc Alphand Aventures	Chevrolet Corvette C6.R	Chevrolet LS7.R 7.0 L V8	73	(France) Roland Bervillé	1–3
(France) Luc Alphand Aventures	Chevrolet Corvette C6.R	Chevrolet LS7.R 7.0 L V8	73	(France) Sébastien Dumez	1–3
(France) Luc Alphand Aventures	Chevrolet Corvette C6.R	Chevrolet LS7.R 7.0 L V8	73	(Monaco) Olivier Beretta	4
(France) Luc Alphand Aventures	Chevrolet Corvette C6.R	Chevrolet LS7.R 7.0 L V8	73	(France) Jérôme Policand	4

=== GT2 ===
Team	Chassis	Engine	No.	Drivers	Rounds
(France) IMSA Performance Matmut	Porsche 997 GT3-RSR	Porsche M97/77 3.8 L Flat-6	75	(France) Richard Balandras	All
(France) IMSA Performance Matmut	Porsche 997 GT3-RSR	Porsche M97/77 3.8 L Flat-6	75	(France) Michel Lecourt	All
(France) IMSA Performance Matmut	Porsche 997 GT3-RSR	Porsche M97/77 3.8 L Flat-6	75	(France) Jean-Philippe Belloc	1–2, 4–5
(France) IMSA Performance Matmut	Porsche 997 GT3-RSR	Porsche M97/77 3.8 L Flat-6	76	(Austria) Richard Lietz	All
(France) IMSA Performance Matmut	Porsche 997 GT3-RSR	Porsche M97/77 3.8 L Flat-6	76	(France) Raymond Narac	All
(Germany) Team Felbermayr-Proton	Porsche 997 GT3-RSR	Porsche M97/77 3.8 L Flat-6	77	(Australia) Alex Davison	All
(Germany) Team Felbermayr-Proton	Porsche 997 GT3-RSR	Porsche M97/77 3.8 L Flat-6	77	(Germany) Marc Lieb	All
(Germany) Team Felbermayr-Proton	Porsche 997 GT3-RSR	Porsche M97/77 3.8 L Flat-6	88	(Austria) Horst Felbermayr Sr.	All
(Germany) Team Felbermayr-Proton	Porsche 997 GT3-RSR	Porsche M97/77 3.8 L Flat-6	88	(Austria) Horst Felbermayr Jr.	All
(Germany) Team Felbermayr-Proton	Porsche 997 GT3-RSR	Porsche M97/77 3.8 L Flat-6	88	(Germany) Christian Ried	All
(Netherlands) Snoras Spyker Squadron	Spyker C8 Laviolette GT2-R	Audi 4.2 L V8	85	(Germany) Ralf Kelleners	All
(Netherlands) Snoras Spyker Squadron	Spyker C8 Laviolette GT2-R	Audi 4.2 L V8	85	(Russia) Alexey Vasiliev	All
(Netherlands) Snoras Spyker Squadron	Spyker C8 Laviolette GT2-R	Audi 4.2 L V8	85	(United Kingdom) Peter Dumbreck	1–4
(Netherlands) Snoras Spyker Squadron	Spyker C8 Laviolette GT2-R	Audi 4.2 L V8	85	(Netherlands) Tom Coronel	5
(Germany) Farnbacher Racing	Ferrari F430 GT2	Ferrari F136GT 4.0 L V8	90	(Germany) Pierre Ehret	All
(Germany) Farnbacher Racing	Ferrari F430 GT2	Ferrari F136GT 4.0 L V8	90	(Germany) Pierre Kaffer	All
(Germany) Farnbacher Racing	Ferrari F430 GT2	Ferrari F136GT 4.0 L V8	90	(France) Anthony Beltoise	1, 4–5
(Germany) Farnbacher Racing	Porsche 997 GT3-RSR	Porsche M97/77 3.8 L Flat-6	91	(Denmark) Lars-Erik Nielsen	All
(Germany) Farnbacher Racing	Porsche 997 GT3-RSR	Porsche M97/77 3.8 L Flat-6	91	(Denmark) Allan Simonsen	1–4
(Germany) Farnbacher Racing	Porsche 997 GT3-RSR	Porsche M97/77 3.8 L Flat-6	91	(United Kingdom) Richard Westbrook	1–4
(Germany) Farnbacher Racing	Porsche 997 GT3-RSR	Porsche M97/77 3.8 L Flat-6	91	(Germany) Dirk Werner	5
(United Kingdom) James Watt Automotive	Aston Martin V8 Vantage GT2	Aston Martin AM05 4.5 L V8	93	(South Africa) Alan van der Merwe	1, 5
(United Kingdom) James Watt Automotive	Aston Martin V8 Vantage GT2	Aston Martin AM05 4.5 L V8	93	(Denmark) Michael Outzen	1, 5
(United Kingdom) James Watt Automotive	Aston Martin V8 Vantage GT2	Aston Martin AM05 4.5 L V8	93	(Belgium) Stéphane Lémeret	1
(United Kingdom) James Watt Automotive	Aston Martin V8 Vantage GT2	Aston Martin AM05 4.5 L V8	93	(United Kingdom) Tim Sugden	5
(United Kingdom) James Watt Automotive	Porsche 997 GT3-RSR	Porsche M97/77 3.8 L Flat-6	95	(United Kingdom) Paul Daniels	All
(United Kingdom) James Watt Automotive	Porsche 997 GT3-RSR	Porsche M97/77 3.8 L Flat-6	95	(Finland) Markus Palttala	1–4
(United Kingdom) James Watt Automotive	Porsche 997 GT3-RSR	Porsche M97/77 3.8 L Flat-6	95	(United Kingdom) Tim Sugden	3–4
(United Kingdom) James Watt Automotive	Porsche 997 GT3-RSR	Porsche M97/77 3.8 L Flat-6	95	(Finland) Mikael Forsten	1
(United Kingdom) James Watt Automotive	Porsche 997 GT3-RSR	Porsche M97/77 3.8 L Flat-6	95	(United Kingdom) Peter Bamford	5
(United Kingdom) James Watt Automotive	Porsche 997 GT3-RSR	Porsche M97/77 3.8 L Flat-6	95	(Republic of Ireland) Matt Griffin	5
(Switzerland) Speedy Racing Team	Spyker C8 Laviolette GT2-R	Audi 4.2 L V8	94	(Switzerland) Andrea Chiesa	All
(Switzerland) Speedy Racing Team	Spyker C8 Laviolette GT2-R	Audi 4.2 L V8	94	(Switzerland) Benjamin Leuenberger	All
(Switzerland) Speedy Racing Team	Spyker C8 Laviolette GT2-R	Audi 4.2 L V8	94	(Switzerland) Iradj Alexander	3
(United Kingdom) Virgo Motorsport	Ferrari F430 GT2	Ferrari F136GT 4.0 L V8	96	(United Kingdom) Rob Bell	1
(United Kingdom) Virgo Motorsport	Ferrari F430 GT2	Ferrari F136GT 4.0 L V8	96	(Italy) Gianmaria Bruni	1
(Monaco) JMB Racing	Ferrari F430 GT2	Ferrari F136GT 4.0 L V8	98	(Switzerland) Maurice Basso	All
(Monaco) JMB Racing	Ferrari F430 GT2	Ferrari F136GT 4.0 L V8	98	(Netherlands) Peter Kutemann	2–5
(Monaco) JMB Racing	Ferrari F430 GT2	Ferrari F136GT 4.0 L V8	98	(Italy) Mauro Casadei	1–2
(Monaco) JMB Racing	Ferrari F430 GT2	Ferrari F136GT 4.0 L V8	98	(United Kingdom) Bo McCormick	1
(Monaco) JMB Racing	Ferrari F430 GT2	Ferrari F136GT 4.0 L V8	98	(France) Stéphane Daoudi	3
(Monaco) JMB Racing	Ferrari F430 GT2	Ferrari F136GT 4.0 L V8	98	(France) Johan-Boris Scheier	4
(Monaco) JMB Racing	Ferrari F430 GT2	Ferrari F136GT 4.0 L V8	98	(France) Julien Gilbert	5
(Monaco) JMB Racing (United Kingdom) Aucott Racing	Ferrari F430 GT2	Ferrari F136GT 4.0 L V8	99	(United Kingdom) Ben Aucott	All
(Monaco) JMB Racing (United Kingdom) Aucott Racing	Ferrari F430 GT2	Ferrari F136GT 4.0 L V8	99	(France) Stéphane Daoudi	1–2, 4–5
(Monaco) JMB Racing (United Kingdom) Aucott Racing	Ferrari F430 GT2	Ferrari F136GT 4.0 L V8	99	(France) Alain Ferté	3

== Season results ==
Overall winners in bold.

Rnd	Circuit	LMP1 Winning Team	LMP2 Winning Team	GT1 Winning Team	GT2 Winning Team	Results
Rnd	Circuit	LMP1 Winning Drivers	LMP2 Winning Drivers	GT1 Winning Drivers	GT2 Winning Drivers	Results
1	Catalunya	(France) **#7 Team Peugeot Total**	(Netherlands) #34 Van Merksteijn Motorsport	(France) #72 Luc Alphand Aventures	(United Kingdom) #96 Virgo Motorsport	Results
1	Catalunya	(France) **Nicolas Minassian** (Spain) **Marc Gené**	(Netherlands) Jos Verstappen (Netherlands) Peter van Merksteijn	(France) Luc Alphand (France) Guillaume Moreau (France) Patrice Goueslard	(United Kingdom) Rob Bell (Italy) Gianmaria Bruni	Results
2	Monza	(France) **#8 Team Peugeot Total**	(Denmark) #31 Team Essex	(United Kingdom) #59 Team Modena	(Germany) #91 Farnbacher Racing	Results
2	Monza	(France) **Stéphane Sarrazin** (Portugal) **Pedro Lamy**	(Denmark) John Nielsen (Denmark) Casper Elgaard	(Spain) Antonio García (Czech Republic) Tomáš Enge	(Denmark) Lars-Erik Nielsen (Denmark) Allan Simonsen (United Kingdom) Richard Westbrook	Results
3	Spa	(France) **#7 Team Peugeot Total**	(Netherlands) #34 Van Merksteijn Motorsport	(France) #72 Luc Alphand Aventures	(United Kingdom) #96 Virgo Motorsport	Results
3	Spa	(France) **Nicolas Minassian** (Spain) **Marc Gené** (Canada) **Jacques Villeneuve**	(Netherlands) Jos Verstappen (Netherlands) Peter van Merksteijn	(Monaco) Olivier Beretta (France) Guillaume Moreau (France) Patrice Goueslard	(United Kingdom) Rob Bell (Italy) Gianmaria Bruni	Results
4	Nürburgring	(France) **#8 Team Peugeot Total**	(Netherlands) #34 Van Merksteijn Motorsport	(United Kingdom) #59 Team Modena	(United Kingdom) #96 Virgo Motorsport	Results
4	Nürburgring	(France) **Stéphane Sarrazin** (Portugal) **Pedro Lamy**	(Netherlands) Jos Verstappen (Netherlands) Jeroen Bleekemolen	(Spain) Antonio García (Czech Republic) Tomáš Enge	(United Kingdom) Rob Bell (Italy) Gianmaria Bruni	Results
5	Silverstone	(Germany) **#1 Audi Sport Team Joest**	(Netherlands) #34 Van Merksteijn Motorsport	(United Kingdom) #59 Team Modena	(United Kingdom) #96 Virgo Motorsport	Results
5	Silverstone	(United Kingdom) **Allan McNish** (Italy) **Rinaldo Capello**	(Netherlands) Jos Verstappen (Netherlands) Peter van Merksteijn	(Spain) Antonio García (Czech Republic) Tomáš Enge	(United Kingdom) Rob Bell (Brazil) Jaime Melo	Results

== Teams Championships ==
Points were awarded to the top eight finishers in the order of 10-8-6-5-4-3-2-1. Unlike the American Le Mans Series, where teams with multiple entries scored the points of their highest finishing entry in each race, teams with multiple entries did not have their cars combined and each entry number was scored separately in the championship. Cars which failed to complete 70% of the winner's distance were not awarded points.

The top two finishers in each team championship earned automatic entry to the 2009 24 Hours of Le Mans.

=== LMP1 Standings ===
Pos	No	Team	Chassis	Engine	CAT (Spain)	MNZ (Italy)	SPA (Belgium)	NÜR (Germany)	SIL (United Kingdom)	Total
1	#2	(Germany) Audi Sport Team Joest	Audi R10 TDI	Audi TDI 5.5 L Turbo V12 (Diesel)	2	2	2	3	4	35
2	#7	(France) Team Peugeot Total	Peugeot 908 HDi FAP	Peugeot HDi 5.5 L Turbo V12 (Diesel)	1	5	1	2	Ret	32
3	#1	(Germany) Audi Sport Team Joest	Audi R10 TDI	Audi TDI 5.5 L Turbo V12 (Diesel)	5	6	4	4	1	27
4	#8	(France) Team Peugeot Total	Peugeot 908 HDi FAP	Peugeot HDi 5.5 L Turbo V12 (Diesel)	8	1	Ret	1	11	21
5	#10	(Czech Republic) Charouz Racing System	Lola B08/60	Aston Martin AM04 6.0 L V12	3	8	10	5	2	19
6	#16	(France) Pescarolo Sport	Pescarolo 01	Judd GV5.5 S2 5.5 L V10	4	Ret	5	Ret	3	15
7	#15	(United Kingdom) Creation AIM	Creation CA07	AIM (Judd) YS5.5 5.5 L V10		4	6	7	5	14
8	#17	(France) Pescarolo Sport	Pescarolo 01	Judd GV5.5 S2 5.5 L V10	6	3	Ret	8	6	13
9	#6	(France) Team Oreca-Matmut	Courage-Oreca LC70	Judd GV5.5 S2 5.5 L V10	Ret	Ret	3	Ret	10	6
10=	#5	(France) Team Oreca-Matmut	Courage-Oreca LC70	Judd GV5.5 S2 5.5 L V10	Ret	Ret		6	7	5
10=	#18	(United Kingdom) Rollcentre Racing	Pescarolo 01	Judd GV5.5 S2 5.5 L V10	7	7	9	9	8	5
12	#20	(Spain) Epsilon Euskadi	Epsilon Euskadi ee1	Judd GV5.5 S2 5.5 L V10	10	Ret	7	12	Ret	2
13	#4	(France) Saulnier Racing	Pescarolo 01	Judd GV5.5 S2 5.5 L V10	Ret	Ret	8	11	9	1
-	#14	(United Kingdom) Creation AIM	Creation CA07	AIM (Judd) YS5.5 5.5 L V10	11	DNS		10	Ret	0
-	#3	(Monaco) Scuderia Lavaggi	Lavaggi LS1	AER P32C 4.0 L Turbo V8	Ret		Ret	NC		0
-	#21	(Spain) Epsilon Euskadi	Epsilon Euskadi ee1	Judd GV5.5 S2 5.5 L V10				NC†	12	0
-	#19	(United Kingdom) Chamberlain-Synergy Motorsport	Lola B06/10	AER P32C 4.0 L Turbo V8	9					0

=== LMP2 Standings ===
Pos	No	Team	Chassis	Engine	CAT (Spain)	MNZ (Italy)	SPA (Belgium)	NÜR (Germany)	SIL (United Kingdom)	Total
1	#34	(Netherlands) Van Merksteijn Motorsport	Porsche RS Spyder Evo	Porsche MR6 3.4 L V8	1	2	1	1	1	48
2	#31	(Denmark) Team Essex	Porsche RS Spyder Evo	Porsche MR6 3.4 L V8	3	1	3	3	5	32
3	#27	(Switzerland) Horag Racing	Porsche RS Spyder Evo	Porsche MR6 3.4 L V8	6	3	2	12	2	25
4=	#35	(France) Saulnier Racing	Pescarolo 01	Judd DB 3.4 L V8	5	5	4	2	9	21
4=	#25	(United Kingdom) Ray Mallock Ltd.	MG-Lola EX265; MG-Lola EX265C	MG (AER) XP21 2.0 L Turbo I4	4	4	6	6	4	21
6	#40	(Portugal) Quifel ASM Team	Lola B05/40	AER P07 2.0 L Turbo I4	9	7	Ret	5	3	12
7	#33	(Switzerland) Speedy Racing Team Sebah	Lola B08/80	Judd DB 3.4 L V8	2	9	NC†	9	Ret	8
8	#41	(Switzerland) Trading Performance	Zytek 07S/2	Zytek ZG348 3.4 L V8	8	Ret	5	10	7	7
9	#45	(United Kingdom) Embassy Racing	Embassy WF01	Zytek ZG348 3.4 L V8	Ret	8	Ret	7	6	6
10	#46	(United Kingdom) Embassy Racing	Embassy WF01	Zytek ZG348 3.4 L V8	Ret	Ret	Ret	4	11	5
11=	#44	(Germany) Kruse Schiller Motorsport	Lola B05/40	Mazda MZR-R 2.0 L Turbo I4	Ret	6	DNS	11	8	4
11=	#26	(United Kingdom) Team Bruichladdich Radical	Radical SR9	AER P07 2.0 L Turbo I4	7	Ret	7	13	10	4
13	#32	(France) Barazi-Epsilon	Zytek 07S/2	Zytek ZG348 3.4 L V8	Ret	Ret	Ret	8	Ret	1
-	#37	(France) WR Salini	WR LMP2008	Zytek ZG348 3.4 L V8	10	Ret	DNQ	Ret	Ret	0
-	#30	(Italy) Racing Box	Lucchini LMP2/08	Judd XV675 3.4 L V8	NC	Ret				0

=== GT1 Standings ===
Pos	No	Team	Chassis	Engine	CAT (Spain)	MNZ (Italy)	SPA (Belgium)	NÜR (Germany)	SIL (United Kingdom)	Total
1	#72	(France) Luc Alphand Aventures	Chevrolet Corvette C6.R	Chevrolet LS7.R 7.0 L V8	1	2	1	2	3	42
2	#59	(United Kingdom) Team Modena	Aston Martin DBR9	Aston Martin AM04 6.0 L V12	Ret	1	3	1	1	36
3	#55	(Russia) IPB Spartak Racing	Lamborghini Murciélago R-GT	Lamborghini L535 6.0 L V12	3	4	2	Ret	2	27
4	#61	(United Kingdom) Strakka Racing	Aston Martin DBR9	Aston Martin AM04 6.0 L V12			4		4	10
5	#50	(France) Larbre Compétition	Saleen S7-R	Ford Windsor 7.0 L V8	2					8
6	#73	(France) Luc Alphand Aventures	Chevrolet Corvette C6.R	Chevrolet LS7.R 7.0 L V8	Ret	3	Ret	Ret		6

=== GT2 Standings ===
Pos	No	Team	Chassis	Engine	CAT (Spain)	MNZ (Italy)	SPA (Belgium)	NÜR (Germany)	SIL (United Kingdom)	Total
1	#96	(United Kingdom) Virgo Motorsport	Ferrari F430 GT2	Ferrari F136 GT 4.0 L V8	1	Ret	1	1	1	40
2	#77	(Germany) Team Felbermayr-Proton	Porsche 997 GT3-RSR	Porsche M97/77 3.8 L Flat-6	2	6	2	2	2	35
3	#90	(Germany) Farnbacher Racing	Ferrari F430 GT2	Ferrari F136 GT 4.0 L V8	4	2	Ret	10	3	19
4	#99	(Monaco) JMB Racing	Ferrari F430 GT2	Ferrari F136 GT 4.0 L V8	6	3	5	4	9	18
5	#76	(France) IMSA Performance Matmut	Porsche 997 GT3-RSR	Porsche M97/77 3.8 L Flat-6	3	DSQ	6	3	Ret	15
6	#85	(Netherlands) Snoras Spyker Squadron	Spyker C8 Laviolette GT2-R	Audi 4.2 L V8	5	NC	9	5	4	13
7=	#94	(Switzerland) Speedy Racing Team Sebah	Spyker C8 Laviolette GT2-R	Audi 4.2 L V8	Ret	4	4	Ret	8	11
7=	#98	(Monaco) JMB Racing	Ferrari F430 GT2	Ferrari F136 GT 4.0 L V8	10	5	7	7	6	11
9=	#91	(Germany) Farnbacher Racing	Porsche 997 GT3-RSR	Porsche M97/77 3.8 L Flat-6	Ret	1	Ret	Ret	Ret	10
9=	#88	(Germany) Team Felbermayr-Proton	Porsche 997 GT3-RSR	Porsche M97/77 3.8 L Flat-6	9	Ret	3	9	5	10
11=	#75	(France) IMSA Performance Matmut	Porsche 997 GT3-RSR	Porsche M97/77 3.8 L Flat-6	7	Ret	Ret	6	Ret	5
11=	#95	(United Kingdom) James Watt Automotive	Porsche 997 GT3-RSR	Porsche M97/77 3.8 L Flat-6	8	7	8	8	Ret	5
13	#93	(United Kingdom) James Watt Automotive	Aston Martin V8 Vantage GT2	Aston Martin AM05 4.5 L V8	DNS				7	2

== Drivers Championships ==
Points were awarded to the top 8 finishers in the order of 10-8-6-5-4-3-2-1. Drivers who did not drive for at least 45 minutes do not receive points.

=== LMP1 Standings ===
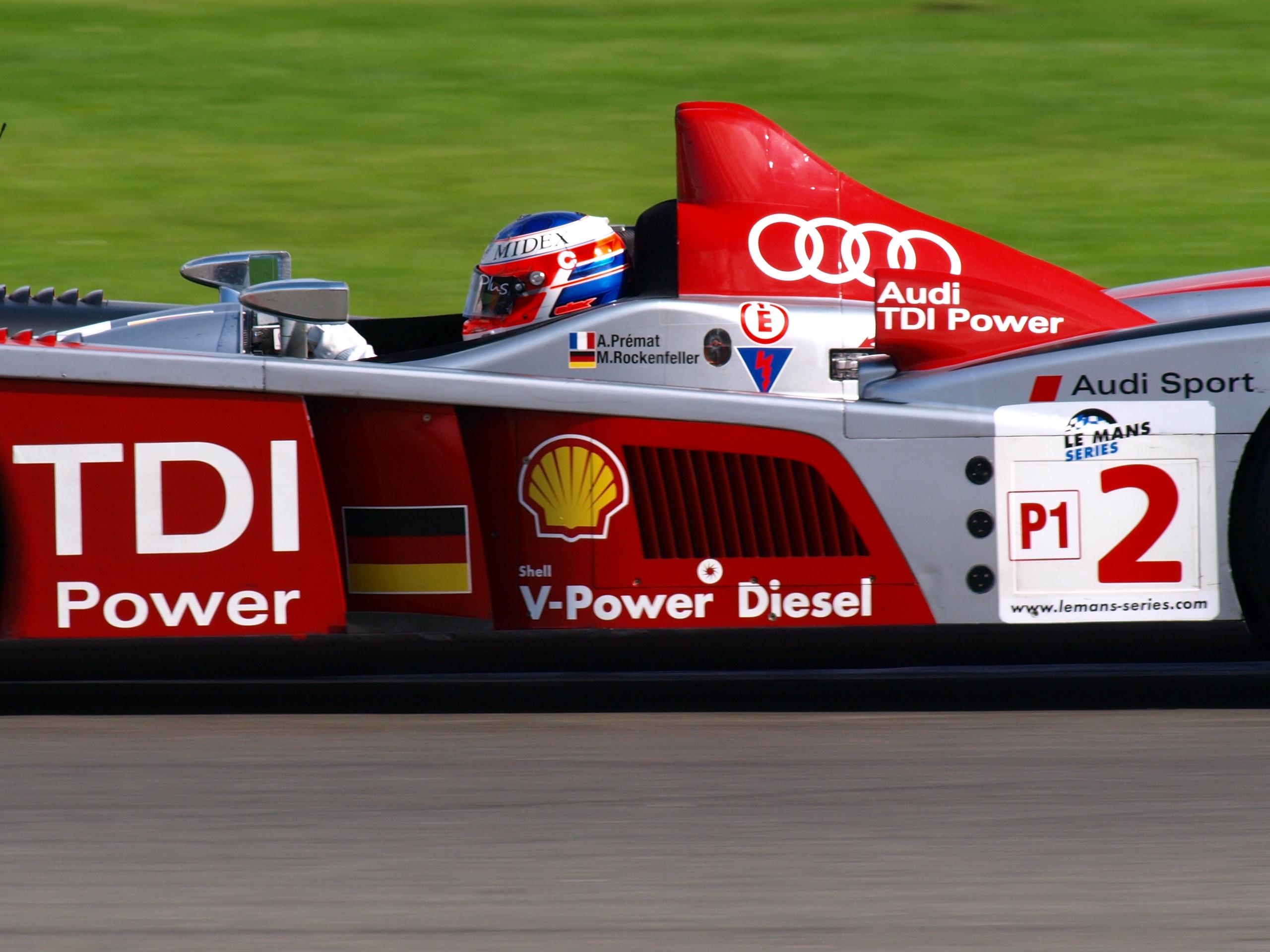
Alexandre Prémat and Mike Rockenfeller won the LMP1 title, despite not winning a race.

Pos	Driver	Team	CAT (Spain)	MNZ (Italy)	SPA (Belgium)	NÜR (Germany)	SIL (United Kingdom)	Total
1	(France) Alexandre Prémat	(Germany) Audi Sport Team Joest	2	2	2	3	4	35
1	(Germany) Mike Rockenfeller	(Germany) Audi Sport Team Joest	2	2	2	3	4	35
2	(France) Nicolas Minassian	(France) Team Peugeot Total	1	5	1	2	Ret	32
2	(Spain) Marc Gené	(France) Team Peugeot Total	1	5	1	2	Ret	32
3	(United Kingdom) Allan McNish	(Germany) Audi Sport Team Joest	5	6	4	4	1	27
3	(Italy) Rinaldo Capello	(Germany) Audi Sport Team Joest	5	6	4	4	1	27
4	(France) Stéphane Sarrazin	(France) Team Peugeot Total	8	1	Ret	1	11	21
4	(Portugal) Pedro Lamy	(France) Team Peugeot Total	8	1	Ret	1	11	21
5	(Czech Republic) Jan Charouz	(Czech Republic) Charouz Racing System	3	8	10	5	2	19
5	(Germany) Stefan Mücke	(Czech Republic) Charouz Racing System	3	8	10	5	2	19
6	(France) Jean-Christophe Boullion	(France) Pescarolo Sport	4	Ret	5	Ret	3	15
7	(United Kingdom) Stuart Hall	(United Kingdom) Creation AIM	11	4	6	7	5	14
8	(Switzerland) Harold Primat	(France) Pescarolo Sport	6	3	NC†	8	6	13
8	(France) Christophe Tinseau	(France) Pescarolo Sport	6	3	NC†	8	6	13
9	(Canada) Jacques Villeneuve	(France) Team Peugeot Total			1			10
10	(France) Emmanuel Collard	(France) Pescarolo Sport	4	Ret	5	Ret		9
11	(United Kingdom) Robbie Kerr	(United Kingdom) Creation AIM		4	6			8
12	(France) Olivier Panis	(France) Team Oreca-Matmut	Ret	Ret	3	NC†	10	6
12	(France) Nicolas Lapierre	(France) Team Oreca-Matmut	Ret	Ret	3	NC†	10	6
13	(France) Romain Dumas	(France) Pescarolo Sport					3	6
14	(United Kingdom) Jamie Campbell-Walter	(United Kingdom) Creation AIM	11	DNS		7	5	6
15	(France) Soheil Ayari	(France) Team Oreca-Matmut	Ret	Ret		6	7	5
15	(Monaco) Stéphane Ortelli	(France) Team Oreca-Matmut	Ret	Ret		6	7	5
16	(Belgium) Vanina Ickx	(United Kingdom) Rollcentre Racing	7	7	9	9	8	5
17	(France) Loïc Duval	(France) Team Oreca-Matmut				6		3
18	(Portugal) João Barbosa	(United Kingdom) Rollcentre Racing	7		9	9	8	3
19	(United Kingdom) Martin Short	(United Kingdom) Rollcentre Racing	7	(7)		9		2
19	(United Kingdom) Duncan Tappy	(United Kingdom) Rollcentre Racing		7				2
20	(Spain) Ángel Burgueño	(Spain) Epsilon Euskadi	10	Ret	7	12	Ret	2
20	(Spain) Miguel Ángel de Castro	(Spain) Epsilon Euskadi	10	Ret	7	12	Ret	2
21	(France) Jacques Nicolet	(France) Saulnier Racing	Ret	Ret	8	11	9	1
21	(Monaco) Richard Hein	(France) Saulnier Racing	Ret	Ret	8	11	9	1
21	(Monaco) Marc Faggionato	(France) Saulnier Racing	Ret	Ret	8			1
=	(United Kingdom) Charlie Hollings	(United Kingdom) Rollcentre Racing					8	1

=== LMP2 Standings ===
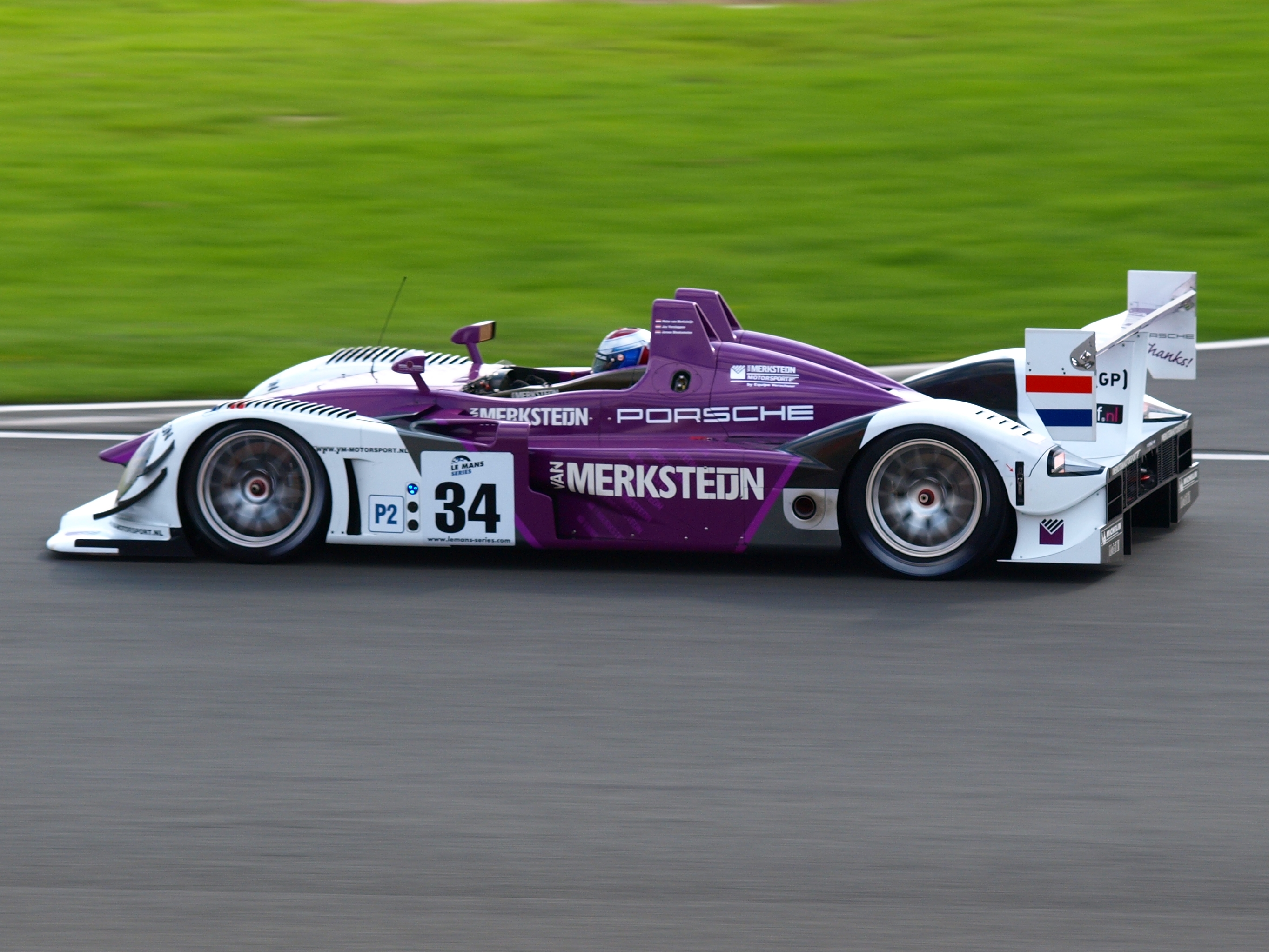
Jos Verstappen won the LMP2 title as part of Van Merksteijn Motorsport.

Pos	Driver	Team	CAT (Spain)	MNZ (Italy)	SPA (Belgium)	NÜR (Germany)	SIL (United Kingdom)	Total
1	(Netherlands) Jos Verstappen	(Netherlands) Van Merksteijn Motorsport	1	2	1	1	1	48
2	(Netherlands) Peter van Merksteijn	(Netherlands) Van Merksteijn Motorsport	1	2	1		1	38
3	(Denmark) John Nielsen	(Denmark) Team Essex	3	1	3	3	5	32
3	(Denmark) Casper Elgaard	(Denmark) Team Essex	3	1	3	3	5	32
4	(Switzerland) Fredy Lienhard	(Switzerland) Horag Racing	6	3	2	12	2	25
4	(Belgium) Didier Theys	(Switzerland) Horag Racing	6	3	2	12	2	25
4	(Netherlands) Jan Lammers	(Switzerland) Horag Racing	6	3	2	12	2	25
5	(France) Pierre Ragues	(France) Saulnier Racing	5	5	4	2	9	21
5	(France) Matthieu Lahaye	(France) Saulnier Racing	5	5	4	2	9	21
=	(United Kingdom) Mike Newton	(United Kingdom) Ray Mallock Ltd.	4	4	6	6	4	21
=	(Brazil) Thomas Erdos	(United Kingdom) Ray Mallock Ltd.	4	4	6	6	4	21
7	(France) Olivier Pla	(Portugal) Quifel ASM Team	9	7	Ret	5	3	12
7	(Portugal) Miguel Amaral	(Portugal) Quifel ASM Team	9	7	Ret	5	3	12
8	(Netherlands) Jeroen Bleekemolen	(Netherlands) Van Merksteijn Motorsport				1		10
9	(Italy) Andrea Belicchi	(Switzerland) Speedy Racing Team Sebah	2	9	NC†	9	Ret	8
9	(France) Xavier Pompidou	(Switzerland) Speedy Racing Team Sebah	2	9	NC†	9	Ret	8
9	(Switzerland) Steve Zacchia	(Switzerland) Speedy Racing Team Sebah	2	9	NC†	9	Ret	8
10	(Saudi Arabia) Karim Ojjeh	(Switzerland) Trading Performance	8	Ret	5	10	7	7
10	(France) Claude-Yves Gosselin	(Switzerland) Trading Performance	8	Ret	5	10	7	7
11	(United Kingdom) Warren Hughes	(United Kingdom) Embassy Racing	Ret	8	Ret	7	6	6
12	(United Kingdom) Joey Foster	(United Kingdom) Embassy Racing	Ret	Ret	Ret	4	11	5
=	(United Kingdom) Darren Manning	(United Kingdom) Embassy Racing				4	11	5
=	(Belgium) Julien Schroyen	(Switzerland) Trading Performance	8	Ret	5			5
=	(United Kingdom) Jonny Kane	(United Kingdom) Embassy Racing	Ret	Ret	Ret	7	6	5
16	(France) Jean de Pourtalès	(Germany) Kruse Schiller Motorsport	Ret	6	DNS	11	8	4
16	(Japan) Hideki Noda	(Germany) Kruse Schiller Motorsport	Ret	6	DNS	11	8	4
17	(Germany) Jens Petersen	(United Kingdom) Team Bruichladdich Radical	7	Ret	7	13	10	4
17	(Germany) Jan-Dirk Leuders	(United Kingdom) Team Bruichladdich Radical	7	Ret	7	13	10	4
17	(France) Marc Rostan	(United Kingdom) Team Bruichladdich Radical	7	Ret	7	13	10	4
18	(United Kingdom) Adam Sharpe	(Switzerland) Trading Performance					7	2
19	(Brazil) Mario Haberfeld	(United Kingdom) Embassy Racing	Ret	8				1
20	(Denmark) Juan Barazi	(France) Barazi-Epsilon	Ret	Ret	Ret	8	Ret	1
20	(Netherlands) Michael Vergers	(France) Barazi-Epsilon	Ret	Ret	Ret	8	Ret	1
=	(Brazil) Fernando Rees	(France) Barazi-Epsilon		Ret	Ret	8	Ret	1

=== GT1 Standings ===
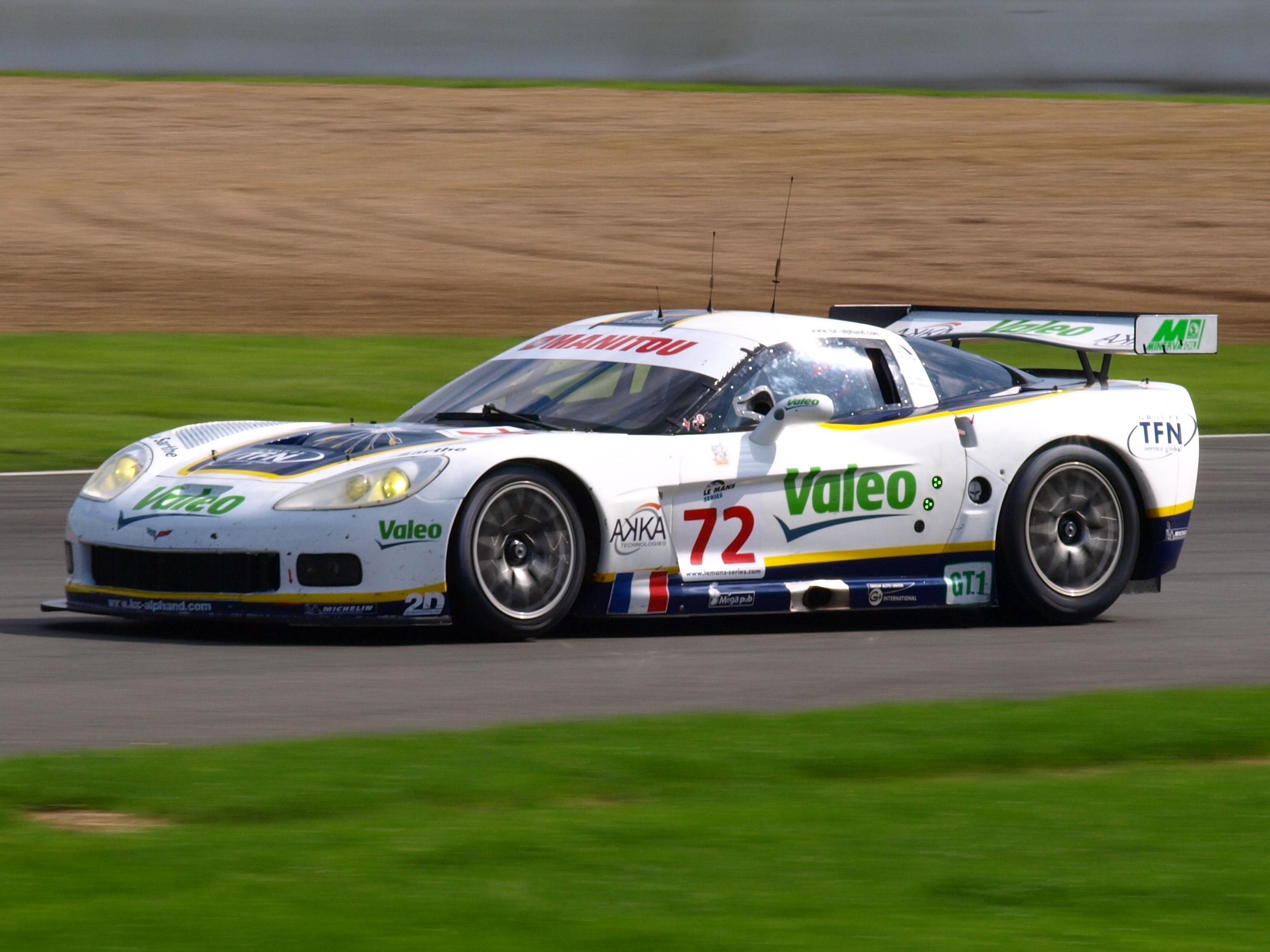
Guillaume Moreau and Patrice Goueslard won the GT1 title for Luc Alphand Aventures.

Pos	Driver	Team	CAT (Spain)	MNZ (Italy)	SPA (Belgium)	NÜR (Germany)	SIL (United Kingdom)	Total
1	(France) Guillaume Moreau	(France) Luc Alphand Aventures	1	2	1	2	3	42
1	(France) Patrice Goueslard	(France) Luc Alphand Aventures	1	2	1	2	3	42
2	(Spain) Antonio García	(United Kingdom) Team Modena	Ret	1	3	1	1	36
2	(Czech Republic) Tomáš Enge	(United Kingdom) Team Modena	Ret	1	3	1	1	36
3	(Netherlands) Peter Kox	(Russia) IPB Spartak Racing	3	4	2	Ret	2	27
3	(Russia) Roman Rusinov	(Russia) IPB Spartak Racing	3	4	2	Ret	2	27
4	(Monaco) Olivier Beretta	(France) Luc Alphand Aventures		2	1	Ret		18
=	(France) Luc Alphand	(France) Luc Alphand Aventures	1			2		18
5	(United Kingdom) Peter Hardman	(United Kingdom) Strakka Racing			4		4	10
5	(United Kingdom) Nick Leventis	(United Kingdom) Strakka Racing			4		4	10
6	(France) Christophe Bouchut	(France) Larbre Compétition	2					8
6	(France) Frédéric Makowiecki	(France) Larbre Compétition	2					8
6	(France) Patrick Bornhauser	(France) Larbre Compétition	2					8
7	(France) Sébastien Dumez	(France) Luc Alphand Aventures	Ret	3	Ret			6
7	(France) Jean-Luc Blanchemain	(France) Luc Alphand Aventures	Ret	3	Ret			6
=	(France) Roland Bervillé	(France) Luc Alphand Aventures	Ret	3				6
9	(United Kingdom) Darren Turner	(United Kingdom) Strakka Racing					4	5

=== GT2 Standings ===
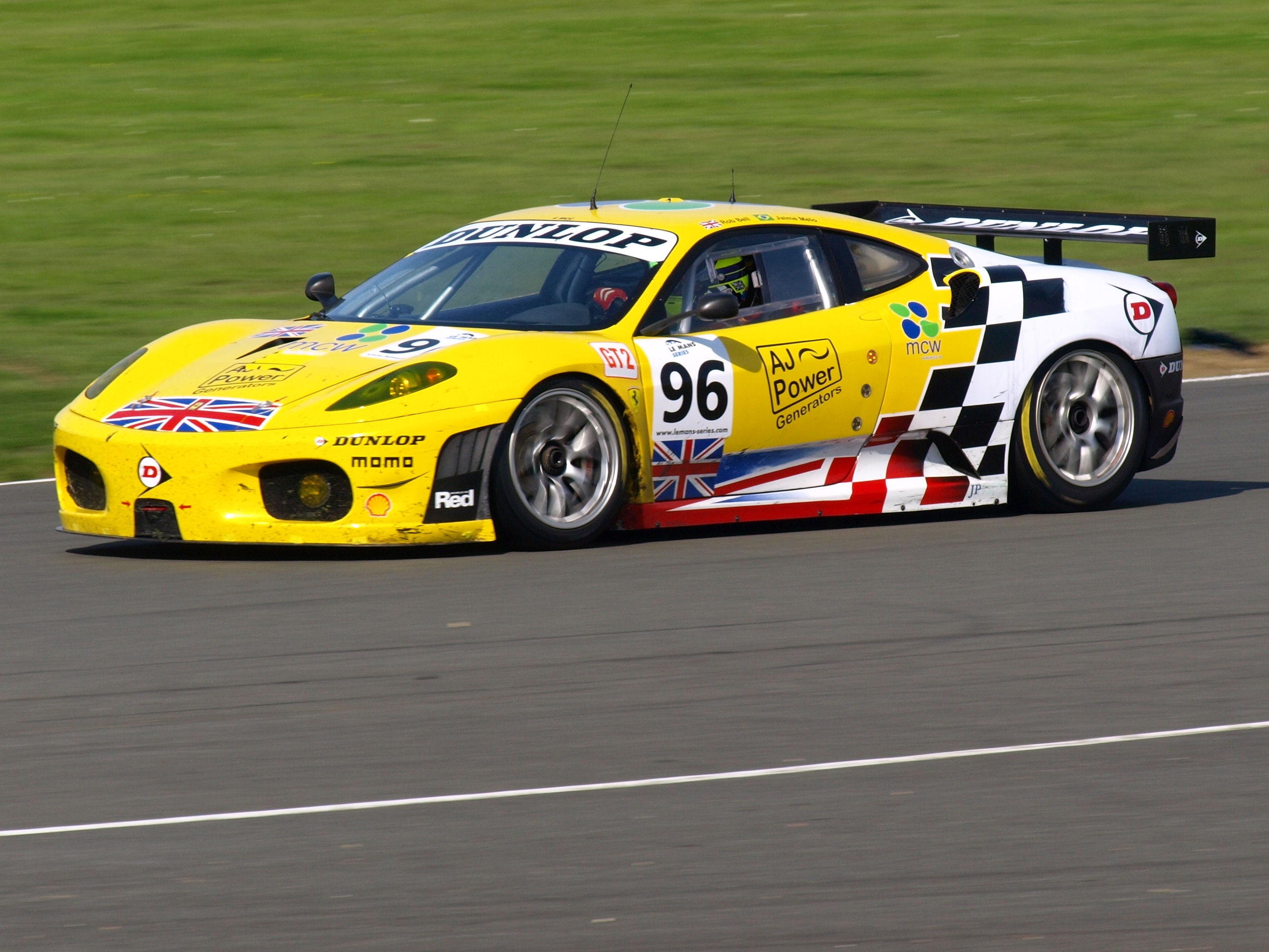
Rob Bell won the GT2 title for Virgo Motorsport.

Pos	Driver	Team	CAT (Spain)	MNZ (Italy)	SPA (Belgium)	NÜR (Germany)	SIL (United Kingdom)	Total
1	(United Kingdom) Rob Bell	(United Kingdom) Virgo Motorsport	1	Ret	1	1	1	40
2	(Germany) Marc Lieb	(Germany) Team Felbermayr-Proton	2	6	2	2	2	35
2	(Australia) Alex Davison	(Germany) Team Felbermayr-Proton	2	6	2	2	2	35
3	(Italy) Gianmaria Bruni	(United Kingdom) Virgo Motorsport	1	Ret	1	1		30
4	(Germany) Pierre Kaffer	(Germany) Farnbacher Racing	4	2	Ret	10	3	19
4	(Germany) Pierre Ehret	(Germany) Farnbacher Racing	4	2	Ret	10	3	19
5	(United Kingdom) Ben Aucott	(Monaco) JMB Racing	6	3	5	4	9	18
6	(France) Stéphane Daoudi	(Monaco) JMB Racing	6	3	7	4	9	16
7	(France) Raymond Narac	(France) IMSA Performance Matmut	3	DSQ	6	3	Ret	15
7	(Austria) Richard Lietz	(France) IMSA Performance Matmut	3	DSQ	6	3	Ret	15
8	(Germany) Ralf Kelleners	(Netherlands) Snoras Spyker Squadron	5	NC	9	5	4	13
8	(Russia) Alexey Vasilyev	(Netherlands) Snoras Spyker Squadron	5	NC	9	5	4	13
9	(France) Anthony Beltoise	(Germany) Farnbacher Racing	4			10	3	11
=	(Switzerland) Andrea Chiesa	(Switzerland) Speedy Racing Team Sebah	Ret	4	4	Ret	8	11
=	(Switzerland) Benjamin Leuenberger	(Switzerland) Speedy Racing Team Sebah	Ret	4	4	Ret	8	11
=	(Switzerland) Maurice Basso	(Monaco) JMB Racing	10	5	7	7	6	11
=	(Netherlands) Peter Kutemann	(Monaco) JMB Racing		5	7	7	6	11
13	(Denmark) Lars-Erik Nielsen	(Germany) Farnbacher Racing	Ret	1	Ret	Ret	Ret	10
=	(Denmark) Allan Simonsen	(Germany) Farnbacher Racing	Ret	1	Ret	Ret		10
=	(United Kingdom) Richard Westbrook	(Germany) Farnbacher Racing	Ret	1	Ret	Ret		10
15	(Brazil) Jaime Melo	(United Kingdom) Virgo Motorsport					1	10
=	(Austria) Horst Felbermayr, Sr.	(Germany) Team Felbermayr-Proton	9	Ret	3	9	5	10
=	(Austria) Horst Felbermayr, Jr.	(Germany) Team Felbermayr-Proton	9	Ret	3	9	5	10
=	(Germany) Christian Ried	(Germany) Team Felbermayr-Proton	9	Ret	3	9	5	10
17	(United Kingdom) Peter Dumbreck	(Netherlands) Snoras Spyker Squadron	5	NC	9	5		8
18	(United Kingdom) Tim Sugden	(United Kingdom) James Watt Automotive		7	8	8	7	6
19	(Switzerland) Iradj Alexander	(Switzerland) Speedy Racing Team Sebah			4			5
=	(Netherlands) Tom Coronel	(Netherlands) Snoras Spyker Squadron					4	5
=	(France) Richard Balandras	(France) IMSA Performance Matmut	7	Ret	Ret	6	Ret	5
=	(France) Michel Lecourt	(France) IMSA Performance Matmut	7	Ret	Ret	6	Ret	5
=	(France) Jean-Philippe Belloc	(France) IMSA Performance Matmut	7	Ret		6		5
=	(United Kingdom) Paul Daniels	(United Kingdom) James Watt Automotive	8	7	8	8	Ret	5
=	(Finland) Markus Palttala	(United Kingdom) James Watt Automotive	8	7	8	8		5
25	(Italy) Mauro Casadei	(Monaco) JMB Racing	10	5				4
=	(France) Alain Ferté	(Monaco) JMB Racing			5			4
27	(France) Julien Gilbert	(Monaco) JMB Racing					6	3
28	(France) Johan-Boris Scheier	(Monaco) JMB Racing				7		2
=	(South Africa) Alan van der Merwe	(United Kingdom) James Watt Automotive	DNS				7	2
=	(Denmark) Michael Outzen	(United Kingdom) James Watt Automotive	DNS				7	2
30	(Finland) Mikael Forsten	(United Kingdom) James Watt Automotive	8					1

== Confirmed entries ==
=== LMP1 ===
- Oreca purchased Courage Compétition on 14 September 2007. Oreca ran two Oreca-Courage LC70s in 2008, with Judd engines replacing AER units. Olivier Panis was one of the team's drivers.
- Audi announced their intentions to run in the LMS in 2008, pending a marketing agreement for the series which Audi finds favorable. The two-car team was run by Joest Racing.
- Epsilon Euskadi planned to enter two EE1 coupes in the 2008 season.
- Creation Autosportif was due to switch to new AIM-built engines in 2008, while also running two cars.
- On 10 January 2008, Aston Martin announced that it would be moving into the LMP1 category. Using the same engine as the GT1-class DBR9, the prototype was a Lola B08/60 coupe. Charouz Racing System ran the car with assistance from Prodrive, with drivers Tomáš Enge, Jan Charouz, and Stefan Mücke.
- Swiss Spirit, now under the control of Phoenix Racing, planned a return for their Audi-powered Lola.

=== LMP2 ===
- Caspar Elgaard and John Nielsen formed Team Essex, running a Porsche RS Spyder in 2008.
- Van Merksteijn (VM) Motorsport entered an RS Spyder in the series, driven by Dutchmen Jeroen Bleekemolen, Peter van Merksteijn Sr. and Jos Verstappen.
- Swiss Horag Racing competed with an RS Spyder, with regular drivers Fredy Lienhard and Didier Theys.
- Welter Racing returned to the series with an all-new prototype. The WR was powered by a Zytek V8 for the first time.
- On 23 October 2007, Pescarolo Sport merged with Saulnier Sport to form Pescarolo Automobiles. Besides Pescarolo Sport's two-car LMP1 effort, Pescarolo Automobiles also had an LMP2 team run by Saulnier.
- Embassy Racing constructed their own cars in 2008, known as the Embassy WF01. The cars will be powered by Zytek engines, and Warren Hughes, Jonny Kane and Joey Foster were to be drivers.
- Speed Racing Team and Sebah Automotive planned a joint campaign with a new Lola B08/80 under the Speedy Racing Team Sebah banner.
- Racing Box moved to LMP2 with the purchase of a Lucchini-Judd.

=== GT1 ===
- Larbre Compétition were no longer be a factory-backed Aston Martin squad, instead moving to a pair of Oreca-supported Saleen S7-Rs.

=== GT2 ===
- Spyker built new coupes (Laviolettes) for the GT2 class, both for their own team as well as replacements for the Speedy Racing Team.
