= 2008 1000 km of Catalunya =

International motor racing meeting

Layout of the Circuit de Catalunya (2007-2020)

The 2008 1000 km of Catalunya was the opening round of the 2008 Le Mans Series season. It took place at the Circuit de Catalunya, Spain, on 6 April 2008.

== Race results ==
Class winners in bold. Cars failing to complete 70% of winner's distance marked as Not Classified (NC).

Pos	Class	No	Team	Drivers	Chassis	Tyre	Laps
Pos	Class	No	Team	Drivers	Engine	Tyre	Laps
1	**LMP1**	**7**	**(France) Team Peugeot Total**	**(France) Nicolas Minassian (Spain) Marc Gené**	**Peugeot 908 HDi FAP**	M	**215**
1	**LMP1**	**7**	**(France) Team Peugeot Total**	**(France) Nicolas Minassian (Spain) Marc Gené**	**Peugeot HDi 5.5 L Turbo V12 (Diesel)**	M	**215**
2	LMP1	2	(Germany) Audi Sport Team Joest	(France) Alexandre Prémat (Germany) Mike Rockenfeller	Audi R10	M	214
2	LMP1	2	(Germany) Audi Sport Team Joest	(France) Alexandre Prémat (Germany) Mike Rockenfeller	Audi TDI 5.5 L Turbo V12 (Diesel)	M	214
3	LMP1	10	(Czech Republic) Charouz Racing System	(Czech Republic) Jan Charouz (Germany) Stefan Mücke	Lola B08/60	M	212
3	LMP1	10	(Czech Republic) Charouz Racing System	(Czech Republic) Jan Charouz (Germany) Stefan Mücke	Aston Martin AM04 6.0 L V12	M	212
4	LMP1	16	(France) Pescarolo Sport	(France) Emmanuel Collard (France) Jean-Christophe Boullion	Pescarolo 01	M	210
4	LMP1	16	(France) Pescarolo Sport	(France) Emmanuel Collard (France) Jean-Christophe Boullion	Judd GV5.5 S2 5.5 L V10	M	210
5	LMP1	1	(Germany) Audi Sport Team Joest	(United Kingdom) Allan McNish (Italy) Rinaldo Capello	Audi R10	M	209
5	LMP1	1	(Germany) Audi Sport Team Joest	(United Kingdom) Allan McNish (Italy) Rinaldo Capello	Audi TDI 5.5 L Turbo V12 (Diesel)	M	209
6	**LMP2**	**34**	**(Netherlands) Van Merksteijn Motorsport (Netherlands) Equipe Verschuur**	**(Netherlands) Peter van Merksteijn Sr. (Netherlands) Jos Verstappen**	**Porsche RS Spyder Evo**	M	**208**
6	**LMP2**	**34**	**(Netherlands) Van Merksteijn Motorsport (Netherlands) Equipe Verschuur**	**(Netherlands) Peter van Merksteijn Sr. (Netherlands) Jos Verstappen**	**Porsche MR6 3.4 L V8**	M	**208**
7	LMP1	17	(France) Pescarolo Sport	(Switzerland) Harold Primat (France) Christophe Tinseau	Pescarolo 01	M	208
7	LMP1	17	(France) Pescarolo Sport	(Switzerland) Harold Primat (France) Christophe Tinseau	Judd GV5.5 S2 5.5 L V10	M	208
8	LMP2	33	(Switzerland) Speedy Racing Team (United Kingdom) Sebah Automotive	(Italy) Andrea Belicchi (France) Xavier Pompidou (Switzerland) Steve Zacchia	Lola B08/80	M	207
8	LMP2	33	(Switzerland) Speedy Racing Team (United Kingdom) Sebah Automotive	(Italy) Andrea Belicchi (France) Xavier Pompidou (Switzerland) Steve Zacchia	Judd DB 3.4 L V8	M	207
9	LMP2	31	(Denmark) Team Essex	(Denmark) Casper Elgaard (Denmark) John Nielsen	Porsche RS Spyder Evo	D	204
9	LMP2	31	(Denmark) Team Essex	(Denmark) Casper Elgaard (Denmark) John Nielsen	Porsche MR6 3.4 L V8	D	204
10	LMP1	18	(United Kingdom) Rollcentre Racing	(United Kingdom) Martin Short (Belgium) Vanina Ickx (Portugal) João Barbosa	Pescarolo 01	D	204
10	LMP1	18	(United Kingdom) Rollcentre Racing	(United Kingdom) Martin Short (Belgium) Vanina Ickx (Portugal) João Barbosa	Judd GV5.5 S2 5.5 L V10	D	204
11	LMP2	25	(United Kingdom) Ray Mallock Ltd.	(United Kingdom) Mike Newton (Brazil) Thomas Erdos	MG-Lola EX265	M	201
11	LMP2	25	(United Kingdom) Ray Mallock Ltd.	(United Kingdom) Mike Newton (Brazil) Thomas Erdos	MG (AER) XP21 2.0 L Turbo I4	M	201
12	LMP1	8	(France) Team Peugeot Total	(France) Stéphane Sarrazin (Portugal) Pedro Lamy	Peugeot 908 HDi FAP	M	200
12	LMP1	8	(France) Team Peugeot Total	(France) Stéphane Sarrazin (Portugal) Pedro Lamy	Peugeot HDi 5.5 L Turbo V12 (Diesel)	M	200
13	LMP2	35	(France) Saulnier Racing	(France) Pierre Ragues (France) Matthieu Lahaye	Pescarolo 01	M	199
13	LMP2	35	(France) Saulnier Racing	(France) Pierre Ragues (France) Matthieu Lahaye	Judd DB 3.4 L V8	M	199
14	LMP2	27	(Switzerland) Horag Racing	(Switzerland) Fredy Lienhard (Belgium) Didier Theys (Netherlands) Jan Lammers	Porsche RS Spyder Evo	M	198
14	LMP2	27	(Switzerland) Horag Racing	(Switzerland) Fredy Lienhard (Belgium) Didier Theys (Netherlands) Jan Lammers	Porsche MR6 3.4 L V8	M	198
15	LMP2	26	(United Kingdom) Team Bruichladdich Radical	(Germany) Jens Petersen (Germany) Jan-Dirk Lueders (France) Marc Rostan	Radical SR9	D	194
15	LMP2	26	(United Kingdom) Team Bruichladdich Radical	(Germany) Jens Petersen (Germany) Jan-Dirk Lueders (France) Marc Rostan	AER P07 2.0 L Turbo I4	D	194
16	**GT1**	**72**	**(France) Luc Alphand Aventures**	**(France) Luc Alphand (France) Guillaume Moreau (France) Patrice Goueslard**	**Chevrolet Corvette C6.R**	M	**194**
16	**GT1**	**72**	**(France) Luc Alphand Aventures**	**(France) Luc Alphand (France) Guillaume Moreau (France) Patrice Goueslard**	**Chevrolet LS7.R 7.0 L V8**	M	**194**
17	LMP2	41	(Switzerland) Trading Performance	(Saudi Arabia) Karim Ojjeh (France) Claude-Yves Gosselin (Belgium) Julien Schroyen	Zytek 07S/2	M	193
17	LMP2	41	(Switzerland) Trading Performance	(Saudi Arabia) Karim Ojjeh (France) Claude-Yves Gosselin (Belgium) Julien Schroyen	Zytek ZG348 3.4 L V8	M	193
18	GT1	50	(France) Larbre Compétition	(France) Frédéric Makowiecki (France) Christophe Bouchut (France) Patrick Bornhauser	Saleen S7-R	M	192
18	GT1	50	(France) Larbre Compétition	(France) Frédéric Makowiecki (France) Christophe Bouchut (France) Patrick Bornhauser	Ford Windsor 7.0 L V8	M	192
19	GT1	55	(Russia) IPB Spartak Racing (Germany) Reiter Engineering	(Netherlands) Peter Kox (Russia) Roman Rusinov	Lamborghini Murciélago R-GT	M	190
19	GT1	55	(Russia) IPB Spartak Racing (Germany) Reiter Engineering	(Netherlands) Peter Kox (Russia) Roman Rusinov	Lamborghini L535 6.0 L V12	M	190
20	LMP2	40	(Portugal) Quifel ASM Team	(Portugal) Miguel Amaral (France) Olivier Pla	Lola B05/40	D	190
20	LMP2	40	(Portugal) Quifel ASM Team	(Portugal) Miguel Amaral (France) Olivier Pla	AER P07 2.0 L Turbo I4	D	190
21	**GT2**	**96**	**(United Kingdom) Virgo Motorsport**	**(United Kingdom) Rob Bell (Italy) Gianmaria Bruni**	**Ferrari F430GT**	D	**189**
21	**GT2**	**96**	**(United Kingdom) Virgo Motorsport**	**(United Kingdom) Rob Bell (Italy) Gianmaria Bruni**	**Ferrari F136 4.0 L V8**	D	**189**
22	GT2	77	(Germany) Team Felbermayr-Proton	(Germany) Marc Lieb (Australia) Alex Davison	Porsche 997 GT3-RSR	M	189
22	GT2	77	(Germany) Team Felbermayr-Proton	(Germany) Marc Lieb (Australia) Alex Davison	Porsche M97/74 4.0 L Flat-6	M	189
23	GT2	76	(France) IMSA Performance Matmut	(France) Raymond Narac (Austria) Richard Lietz	Porsche 997 GT3-RSR	M	187
23	GT2	76	(France) IMSA Performance Matmut	(France) Raymond Narac (Austria) Richard Lietz	Porsche M97/74 4.0 L Flat-6	M	187
24	GT2	90	(Germany) Farnbacher Racing	(Germany) Pierre Ehret (Germany) Pierre Kaffer (France) Anthony Beltoise	Ferrari F430GT	M	186
24	GT2	90	(Germany) Farnbacher Racing	(Germany) Pierre Ehret (Germany) Pierre Kaffer (France) Anthony Beltoise	Ferrari F136 4.0 L V8	M	186
25	GT2	85	(Netherlands) Snoras Spyker Squadron	(United Kingdom) Peter Dumbreck (Germany) Ralf Kelleners (Russia) Alexey Vasiliev	Spyker C8 Laviolette GT2-R	M	184
25	GT2	85	(Netherlands) Snoras Spyker Squadron	(United Kingdom) Peter Dumbreck (Germany) Ralf Kelleners (Russia) Alexey Vasiliev	Audi 4.0 L V8	M	184
26	GT2	99	(Monaco) JMB Racing (United Kingdom) Aucott Racing	(France) Stéphane Daoudi (United Kingdom) Ben Aucott	Ferrari F430GT	M	183
26	GT2	99	(Monaco) JMB Racing (United Kingdom) Aucott Racing	(France) Stéphane Daoudi (United Kingdom) Ben Aucott	Ferrari F136 4.0 L V8	M	183
27	GT2	75	(France) IMSA Performance Matmut	(France) Richard Balandras (France) Michel Lecourt (France) Jean-Philippe Belloc	Porsche 997 GT3-RSR	M	182
27	GT2	75	(France) IMSA Performance Matmut	(France) Richard Balandras (France) Michel Lecourt (France) Jean-Philippe Belloc	Porsche M97/74 4.0 L Flat-6	M	182
28	GT2	95	(United Kingdom) James Watt Automotive	(Finland) Markus Palttala (Finland) Mikael Forsten (United Kingdom) Paul Daniels	Porsche 997 GT3-RSR	D	182
28	GT2	95	(United Kingdom) James Watt Automotive	(Finland) Markus Palttala (Finland) Mikael Forsten (United Kingdom) Paul Daniels	Porsche M97/74 4.0 L Flat-6	D	182
29	GT2	88	(Germany) Team Felbermayr-Proton	(Austria) Horst Felbermayr, Sr. (Austria) Horst Felbermayr, Jr. (Germany) Christian Ried	Porsche 997 GT3-RSR	M	181
29	GT2	88	(Germany) Team Felbermayr-Proton	(Austria) Horst Felbermayr, Sr. (Austria) Horst Felbermayr, Jr. (Germany) Christian Ried	Porsche M97/74 4.0 L Flat-6	M	181
30	GT2	98	(Monaco) JMB Racing	(United Kingdom) Bo McCormick (Switzerland) Maurice Basso (Italy) Mauro Casadei	Ferrari F430GT	M	178
30	GT2	98	(Monaco) JMB Racing	(United Kingdom) Bo McCormick (Switzerland) Maurice Basso (Italy) Mauro Casadei	Ferrari F136 4.0 L V8	M	178
31	LMP1	19	(United Kingdom) Chamberlain-Synergy Motorsport	(United Kingdom) Bob Berridge (United Kingdom) Gareth Evans	Lola B06/10	D	177
31	LMP1	19	(United Kingdom) Chamberlain-Synergy Motorsport	(United Kingdom) Bob Berridge (United Kingdom) Gareth Evans	AER P32C 4.0 L Turbo V8	D	177
32	LMP1	20	(Spain) Epsilon Euskadi	(Spain) Angel Burgueño (Spain) Miguel Ángel de Castro	Epsilon Euskadi EE1	M	167
32	LMP1	20	(Spain) Epsilon Euskadi	(Spain) Angel Burgueño (Spain) Miguel Ángel de Castro	Judd GV5.5 S2 5.5 L V10	M	167
33	LMP1	14	(United Kingdom) Creation Autosportif	(United Kingdom) Jamie Campbell-Walter (United Kingdom) Stuart Hall (Switzerland) Felipe Ortiz	Creation CA07	D	163
33	LMP1	14	(United Kingdom) Creation Autosportif	(United Kingdom) Jamie Campbell-Walter (United Kingdom) Stuart Hall (Switzerland) Felipe Ortiz	AIM (Judd) YS5.5 5.5 L V10	D	163
34	LMP2	37	(France) WR Salini	(France) Stéphane Salini (France) Philippe Salini (France) Patrice Roussel	WR LMP2008	D	154
34	LMP2	37	(France) WR Salini	(France) Stéphane Salini (France) Philippe Salini (France) Patrice Roussel	Zytek ZG348 3.4 L V8	D	154
35 NC	LMP2	30	(Italy) Racing Box	(Italy) Filippo Francioni (Italy) Marco Didaio	Lucchini LMP2/04	D	142
35 NC	LMP2	30	(Italy) Racing Box	(Italy) Filippo Francioni (Italy) Marco Didaio	Judd XV675 3.4 L V8	D	142
36 DNF	LMP1	6	(France) Team Oreca-Matmut	(France) Olivier Panis (France) Nicolas Lapierre	Courage-Oreca LC70	M	178
36 DNF	LMP1	6	(France) Team Oreca-Matmut	(France) Olivier Panis (France) Nicolas Lapierre	Judd GV5.5 S2 5.5 L V10	M	178
37 DNF	GT1	73	(France) Luc Alphand Aventures	(France) Sébastien Dumez (France) Jean-Luc Blanchemain (France) Roland Bervillé	Chevrolet Corvette C6.R	M	162
37 DNF	GT1	73	(France) Luc Alphand Aventures	(France) Sébastien Dumez (France) Jean-Luc Blanchemain (France) Roland Bervillé	Chevrolet LS7.R 7.0 L V8	M	162
38 DNF	LMP1	4	(France) Saulnier Racing	(France) Jacques Nicolet (Monaco) Marc Faggionato (Monaco) Richard Hein	Pescarolo 01	M	132
38 DNF	LMP1	4	(France) Saulnier Racing	(France) Jacques Nicolet (Monaco) Marc Faggionato (Monaco) Richard Hein	Judd GV5.5 S2 5.5 L V10	M	132
39 DNF	GT1	59	(United Kingdom) Team Modena	(Czech Republic) Tomáš Enge (Spain) Antonio García	Aston Martin DBR9	M	124
39 DNF	GT1	59	(United Kingdom) Team Modena	(Czech Republic) Tomáš Enge (Spain) Antonio García	Aston Martin AM04 6.0 L V12	M	124
40 DNF	LMP1	5	(France) Team Oreca-Matmut	(France) Soheil Ayari (Monaco) Stéphane Ortelli	Courage-Oreca LC70	M	108
40 DNF	LMP1	5	(France) Team Oreca-Matmut	(France) Soheil Ayari (Monaco) Stéphane Ortelli	Judd GV5.5 S2 5.5 L V10	M	108
41 DNF	LMP2	44	(Germany) Kruse Schiller Motorsport	(France) Jean de Pourtales (Japan) Hideki Noda	Lola B05/40	D	94
41 DNF	LMP2	44	(Germany) Kruse Schiller Motorsport	(France) Jean de Pourtales (Japan) Hideki Noda	Mazda MZR-R 2.0 L Turbo I4	D	94
42 DNF	GT2	91	(Germany) Farnbacher Racing	(Denmark) Lars-Erik Nielsen (Denmark) Allan Simonsen (United Kingdom) Richard Westbrook	Porsche 997 GT3-RSR	M	90
42 DNF	GT2	91	(Germany) Farnbacher Racing	(Denmark) Lars-Erik Nielsen (Denmark) Allan Simonsen (United Kingdom) Richard Westbrook	Porsche M97/74 4.0 L Flat-6	M	90
43 DNF	LMP1	3	(Monaco) Scuderia Lavaggi	(Monaco) Giovanni Lavaggi (Germany) Wolfgang Kaufmann	Lavaggi LS1	D	87
43 DNF	LMP1	3	(Monaco) Scuderia Lavaggi	(Monaco) Giovanni Lavaggi (Germany) Wolfgang Kaufmann	AER P32C 4.0 L Turbo V8	D	87
44 DNF	LMP2	32	(France) Barazi-Epsilon	(Denmark) Juan Barazi (Netherlands) Michael Vergers	Zytek 07S/2	M	55
44 DNF	LMP2	32	(France) Barazi-Epsilon	(Denmark) Juan Barazi (Netherlands) Michael Vergers	Zytek ZG348 3.4 L V8	M	55
45 DNF	LMP2	45	(United Kingdom) Embassy Racing	(Brazil) Mario Haberfeld (United Kingdom) Warren Hughes	Embassy WF01	M	43
45 DNF	LMP2	45	(United Kingdom) Embassy Racing	(Brazil) Mario Haberfeld (United Kingdom) Warren Hughes	Zytek ZG348 3.4 L V8	M	43
46 DNF	LMP2	46	(United Kingdom) Embassy Racing	(United Kingdom) Jonny Kane (United Kingdom) Joey Foster	Embassy WF01	M	41
46 DNF	LMP2	46	(United Kingdom) Embassy Racing	(United Kingdom) Jonny Kane (United Kingdom) Joey Foster	Zytek ZG348 3.4 L V8	M	41
47 DNF	GT2	94	(Switzerland) Speedy Racing Team	(Switzerland) Andrea Chiesa (Switzerland) Benjamin Leuenberger	Spyker C8 Laviolette GT2-R	M	17
47 DNF	GT2	94	(Switzerland) Speedy Racing Team	(Switzerland) Andrea Chiesa (Switzerland) Benjamin Leuenberger	Audi 4.0 L V8	M	17
DNS	GT2	93	(United Kingdom) James Watt Automotive	(South Africa) Alan van der Merwe (Belgium) Stéphane Lémeret (Denmark) Michael Outzen	Aston Martin V8 Vantage GT2	D	-
DNS	GT2	93	(United Kingdom) James Watt Automotive	(South Africa) Alan van der Merwe (Belgium) Stéphane Lémeret (Denmark) Michael Outzen	Aston Martin AJ37 4.5 L V8	D	-

== Statistics ==
- Pole Position - #8 Team Peugeot Total - 1:31.875
- Fastest Lap - #8 Team Peugeot Total - 1:33.515
- Average Speed - 167.030 km/h

Le Mans Series
Previous race: None	2008 season	Next race: 2008 1000km of Monza
