= 2008 1000 km of Nürburgring =

Sports car endurance race in Germany

Nürburgring

The 2008 1000 km of Nürburgring was the fourth round of the 2008 Le Mans Series season. It took place at the Nürburgring, Germany, on 17 August 2008.

== Race results ==
Class winners in bold. Cars failing to complete 70% of winner's distance marked as Not Classified (NC).

Pos	Class	No	Team	Drivers	Chassis	Tyre	Laps
Pos	Class	No	Team	Drivers	Engine	Tyre	Laps
1	**LMP1**	**8**	**(France) Team Peugeot Total**	**(France) Stéphane Sarrazin (Portugal) Pedro Lamy**	**Peugeot 908 HDi FAP**	MI	**195**
1	**LMP1**	**8**	**(France) Team Peugeot Total**	**(France) Stéphane Sarrazin (Portugal) Pedro Lamy**	**Peugeot HDi 5.5 L Turbo V12 (Diesel)**	MI	**195**
2	LMP1	7	(France) Team Peugeot Total	(France) Nicolas Minassian (Spain) Marc Gené	Peugeot 908 HDi FAP	MI	195
2	LMP1	7	(France) Team Peugeot Total	(France) Nicolas Minassian (Spain) Marc Gené	Peugeot HDi 5.5 L Turbo V12 (Diesel)	MI	195
3	LMP1	2	(Germany) Audi Sport Team Joest	(France) Alexandre Prémat (Germany) Mike Rockenfeller	Audi R10 TDI	MI	194
3	LMP1	2	(Germany) Audi Sport Team Joest	(France) Alexandre Prémat (Germany) Mike Rockenfeller	Audi TDI 5.5 L Turbo V12 (Diesel)	MI	194
4	LMP1	1	(Germany) Audi Sport Team Joest	(United Kingdom) Allan McNish (Italy) Rinaldo Capello	Audi R10 TDI	MI	194
4	LMP1	1	(Germany) Audi Sport Team Joest	(United Kingdom) Allan McNish (Italy) Rinaldo Capello	Audi TDI 5.5 L Turbo V12 (Diesel)	MI	194
5	LMP1	10	(Czech Republic) Charouz Racing System	(Czech Republic) Jan Charouz (Germany) Stefan Mücke	Lola B08/60	MI	189
5	LMP1	10	(Czech Republic) Charouz Racing System	(Czech Republic) Jan Charouz (Germany) Stefan Mücke	Aston Martin 6.0 L V12	MI	189
6	LMP1	5	(France) Team Oreca-Matmut	(France) Soheil Ayari (Monaco) Stéphane Ortelli (France) Loïc Duval	Courage-Oreca LC70	MI	188
6	LMP1	5	(France) Team Oreca-Matmut	(France) Soheil Ayari (Monaco) Stéphane Ortelli (France) Loïc Duval	Judd GV5.5 S2 5.5 L V10	MI	188
7	**LMP2**	**34**	**(Netherlands) Van Merksteijn Motorsport (Netherlands) Equipe Verschuur**	**(Netherlands) Jos Verstappen (Netherlands) Jeroen Bleekemolen**	**Porsche RS Spyder Evo**	MI	**188**
7	**LMP2**	**34**	**(Netherlands) Van Merksteijn Motorsport (Netherlands) Equipe Verschuur**	**(Netherlands) Jos Verstappen (Netherlands) Jeroen Bleekemolen**	**Porsche MR6 3.4 L V8**	MI	**188**
8	LMP1	15	(United Kingdom) Creation AIM	(United Kingdom) Stuart Hall (United Kingdom) Jamie Campbell-Walter	Creation CA07	D	187
8	LMP1	15	(United Kingdom) Creation AIM	(United Kingdom) Stuart Hall (United Kingdom) Jamie Campbell-Walter	AIM (Judd) YS5.5 5.5 L V10	D	187
9	LMP2	35	(France) Saulnier Racing	(France) Pierre Ragues (France) Matthieu Lahaye	Pescarolo 01	MI	184
9	LMP2	35	(France) Saulnier Racing	(France) Pierre Ragues (France) Matthieu Lahaye	Judd DB 3.4 L V8	MI	184
10	LMP2	31	(Denmark) Team Essex	(Denmark) Caspar Elgaard (Denmark) John Nielsen	Porsche RS Spyder Evo	D	184
10	LMP2	31	(Denmark) Team Essex	(Denmark) Caspar Elgaard (Denmark) John Nielsen	Porsche MR6 3.4 L V8	D	184
11	LMP2	46	(United Kingdom) Embassy Racing	(United Kingdom) Darren Manning (United Kingdom) Joey Foster	Embassy WF01	MI	183
11	LMP2	46	(United Kingdom) Embassy Racing	(United Kingdom) Darren Manning (United Kingdom) Joey Foster	Zytek ZG348 3.4 L V8	MI	183
12	LMP2	40	(Portugal) Quifel ASM Team	(Portugal) Miguel Amaral (France) Olivier Pla	Lola B05/40	D	182
12	LMP2	40	(Portugal) Quifel ASM Team	(Portugal) Miguel Amaral (France) Olivier Pla	AER P07 2.0 L Turbo I4	D	182
13	LMP2	25	(United Kingdom) Ray Mallock Ltd.	(United Kingdom) Mike Newton (Brazil) Thomas Erdos	MG-Lola EX265	MI	181
13	LMP2	25	(United Kingdom) Ray Mallock Ltd.	(United Kingdom) Mike Newton (Brazil) Thomas Erdos	MG (AER) XP21 2.0 L Turbo I4	MI	181
14	LMP2	45	(United Kingdom) Embassy Racing	(United Kingdom) Jonny Kane (United Kingdom) Warren Hughes	Embassy WF01	MI	180
14	LMP2	45	(United Kingdom) Embassy Racing	(United Kingdom) Jonny Kane (United Kingdom) Warren Hughes	Zytek ZG348 3.4 L V8	MI	180
15	LMP2	32	(France) Barazi-Epsilon	(Denmark) Juan Barazi (Netherlands) Michael Vergers (Brazil) Fernando Rees	Zytek 07S/2	MI	180
15	LMP2	32	(France) Barazi-Epsilon	(Denmark) Juan Barazi (Netherlands) Michael Vergers (Brazil) Fernando Rees	Zytek ZG348 3.4 L V8	MI	180
16	LMP2	33	(Switzerland) Speedy Racing Team (United Kingdom) Sebah Automotive	(Italy) Andrea Belicchi (France) Xavier Pompidou (Switzerland) Steve Zacchia	Lola B08/80	MI	179
16	LMP2	33	(Switzerland) Speedy Racing Team (United Kingdom) Sebah Automotive	(Italy) Andrea Belicchi (France) Xavier Pompidou (Switzerland) Steve Zacchia	Judd DB 3.4 L V8	MI	179
17	LMP2	41	(Switzerland) Trading Performance	(Saudi Arabia) Karim Ojjeh (France) Claude-Yves Gosselin	Zytek 07S/2	MI	179
17	LMP2	41	(Switzerland) Trading Performance	(Saudi Arabia) Karim Ojjeh (France) Claude-Yves Gosselin	Zytek ZG348 3.4 L V8	MI	179
18	LMP1	17	(France) Pescarolo Sport	(Switzerland) Harold Primat (France) Christophe Tinseau	Pescarolo 01	MI	176
18	LMP1	17	(France) Pescarolo Sport	(Switzerland) Harold Primat (France) Christophe Tinseau	Judd GV5.5 S2 5.5 L V10	MI	176
19	LMP1	18	(United Kingdom) Rollcentre Racing	(Portugal) João Barbosa (Belgium) Vanina Ickx (United Kingdom) Martin Short	Pescarolo 01	D	175
19	LMP1	18	(United Kingdom) Rollcentre Racing	(Portugal) João Barbosa (Belgium) Vanina Ickx (United Kingdom) Martin Short	Judd GV5.5 S2 5.5 L V10	D	175
20	**GT1**	**59**	**(United Kingdom) Team Modena**	**(Czech Republic) Tomáš Enge (Spain) Antonio García**	**Aston Martin DBR9**	MI	**172**
20	**GT1**	**59**	**(United Kingdom) Team Modena**	**(Czech Republic) Tomáš Enge (Spain) Antonio García**	**Aston Martin 6.0 L V12**	MI	**172**
21	LMP2	44	(Germany) Kruse Schiller Motorsport	(France) Jean de Pourtalès (Japan) Hideki Noda	Lola B05/40	D	172
21	LMP2	44	(Germany) Kruse Schiller Motorsport	(France) Jean de Pourtalès (Japan) Hideki Noda	Mazda MZR-R 2.0 L Turbo I4	D	172
22	LMP1	14	(United Kingdom) Creation AIM	(United States) Liz Halliday (South Africa) Stephen Simpson	Creation CA07	D	172
22	LMP1	14	(United Kingdom) Creation AIM	(United States) Liz Halliday (South Africa) Stephen Simpson	AIM (Judd) YS5.5 5.5 L V10	D	172
23	LMP2	27	(Switzerland) Horag Racing	(Switzerland) Fredy Lienhard (Belgium) Didier Theys (Netherlands) Jan Lammers	Porsche RS Spyder Evo	MI	170
23	LMP2	27	(Switzerland) Horag Racing	(Switzerland) Fredy Lienhard (Belgium) Didier Theys (Netherlands) Jan Lammers	Porsche MR6 3.4 L V8	MI	170
24	**GT2**	**96**	**(United Kingdom) Virgo Motorsport**	**(United Kingdom) Rob Bell (Italy) Gianmaria Bruni**	**Ferrari F430GT**	D	**169**
24	**GT2**	**96**	**(United Kingdom) Virgo Motorsport**	**(United Kingdom) Rob Bell (Italy) Gianmaria Bruni**	**Ferrari 4.0 L V8**	D	**169**
25	GT2	77	(Germany) Team Felbermayr-Proton	(Germany) Marc Lieb (Australia) Alex Davison	Porsche 997 GT3-RSR	MI	167
25	GT2	77	(Germany) Team Felbermayr-Proton	(Germany) Marc Lieb (Australia) Alex Davison	Porsche 4.0 L Flat-6	MI	167
26	GT2	76	(France) IMSA Performance Matmut	(France) Raymond Narac (Austria) Richard Lietz	Porsche 997 GT3-RSR	MI	167
26	GT2	76	(France) IMSA Performance Matmut	(France) Raymond Narac (Austria) Richard Lietz	Porsche 4.0 L Flat-6	MI	167
27	GT2	99	(Monaco) JMB Racing (United Kingdom) Aucott Racing	(United Kingdom) Ben Aucott (France) Stéphane Daoudi	Ferrari F430GT	D	166
27	GT2	99	(Monaco) JMB Racing (United Kingdom) Aucott Racing	(United Kingdom) Ben Aucott (France) Stéphane Daoudi	Ferrari 4.0 L V8	D	166
28	GT2	85	(Netherlands) Snoras Spyker Squadron	(United Kingdom) Peter Dumbreck (Germany) Ralf Kelleners (Russia) Alexey Vasilyev	Spyker C8 Laviolette GT2-R	MI	165
28	GT2	85	(Netherlands) Snoras Spyker Squadron	(United Kingdom) Peter Dumbreck (Germany) Ralf Kelleners (Russia) Alexey Vasilyev	Audi 4.0 L V8	MI	165
29	GT2	75	(France) IMSA Performance Matmut	(France) Richard Balandras (France) Michel Lecourt (France) Jean-Philippe Belloc	Porsche 997 GT3-RSR	MI	164
29	GT2	75	(France) IMSA Performance Matmut	(France) Richard Balandras (France) Michel Lecourt (France) Jean-Philippe Belloc	Porsche 4.0 L Flat-6	MI	164
30	LMP1	4	(France) Saulnier Racing	(France) Jacques Nicolet (Monaco) Richard Hein	Pescarolo 01	MI	164
30	LMP1	4	(France) Saulnier Racing	(France) Jacques Nicolet (Monaco) Richard Hein	Judd GV5.5 S2 5.5 L V10	MI	164
31	GT2	98	(Monaco) JMB Racing	(Switzerland) Maurice Basso (Netherlands) Peter Kutemann (France) Johan-Boris Scheier	Ferrari F430GT	D	163
31	GT2	98	(Monaco) JMB Racing	(Switzerland) Maurice Basso (Netherlands) Peter Kutemann (France) Johan-Boris Scheier	Ferrari 4.0 L V8	D	163
32	GT2	95	(United Kingdom) James Watt Automotive	(Finland) Markus Palttala (United Kingdom) Paul Daniels (United Kingdom) Tim Sugden	Porsche 997 GT3-RSR	D	162
32	GT2	95	(United Kingdom) James Watt Automotive	(Finland) Markus Palttala (United Kingdom) Paul Daniels (United Kingdom) Tim Sugden	Porsche 3.8 L Flat-6	D	162
33	LMP1	20	(Spain) Epsilon Euskadi	(Spain) Ángel Burgueño (Spain) Miguel Ángel de Castro	Epsilon Euskadi ee1	MI	160
33	LMP1	20	(Spain) Epsilon Euskadi	(Spain) Ángel Burgueño (Spain) Miguel Ángel de Castro	Judd GV5.5 S2 5.5 L V10	MI	160
34	LMP2	26	(United Kingdom) Team Bruichladdich Radical	(Germany) Jens Petersen (Germany) Jan-Dirk Lueders (France) Marc Rostan	Radical SR9	D	159
34	LMP2	26	(United Kingdom) Team Bruichladdich Radical	(Germany) Jens Petersen (Germany) Jan-Dirk Lueders (France) Marc Rostan	AER P07 2.0 L Turbo I4	D	159
35	GT2	88	(Germany) Team Felbermayr-Proton	(Austria) Horst Felbermayr Sr. (Austria) Horst Felbermayr Jr. (Germany) Christian Ried	Porsche 997 GT3-RSR	MI	157
35	GT2	88	(Germany) Team Felbermayr-Proton	(Austria) Horst Felbermayr Sr. (Austria) Horst Felbermayr Jr. (Germany) Christian Ried	Porsche 4.0 L Flat-6	MI	157
36	GT2	90	(Germany) Farnbacher Racing	(Germany) Pierre Ehret (Germany) Pierre Kaffer (France) Anthony Beltoise	Ferrari F430GT	MI	156
36	GT2	90	(Germany) Farnbacher Racing	(Germany) Pierre Ehret (Germany) Pierre Kaffer (France) Anthony Beltoise	Ferrari 4.0 L V8	MI	156
37	GT1	72	(France) Luc Alphand Aventures	(France) Luc Alphand (France) Guillaume Moreau (France) Patrice Goueslard	Chevrolet Corvette C6.R	MI	140
37	GT1	72	(France) Luc Alphand Aventures	(France) Luc Alphand (France) Guillaume Moreau (France) Patrice Goueslard	Chevrolet LS7-R 7.0 L V8	MI	140
38 NC	LMP1	3	(Monaco) Scuderia Lavaggi	(Monaco) Giovanni Lavaggi (Germany) Wolfgang Kaufmann	Lavaggi LS1	D	110
38 NC	LMP1	3	(Monaco) Scuderia Lavaggi	(Monaco) Giovanni Lavaggi (Germany) Wolfgang Kaufmann	AER P32C 4.0 L Turbo V8	D	110
39 NC^{†}	LMP1	6	(France) Team Oreca-Matmut	(France) Olivier Panis (France) Nicolas Lapierre	Courage-Oreca LC70	MI	167
39 NC^{†}	LMP1	6	(France) Team Oreca-Matmut	(France) Olivier Panis (France) Nicolas Lapierre	Judd GV5.5 S2 5.5 L V10	MI	167
40 NC^{†}	LMP1	21	(Spain) Epsilon Euskadi	(Spain) Adrián Vallés (Japan) Shinji Nakano	Epsilon Euskadi ee1	MI	163
40 NC^{†}	LMP1	21	(Spain) Epsilon Euskadi	(Spain) Adrián Vallés (Japan) Shinji Nakano	Judd GV5.5 S2 5.5 L V10	MI	163
41 DNF	GT2	94	(Switzerland) Speedy Racing Team	(Switzerland) Andrea Chiesa (Switzerland) Benjamin Leuenberger	Spyker C8 Laviolette GT2-R	MI	145
41 DNF	GT2	94	(Switzerland) Speedy Racing Team	(Switzerland) Andrea Chiesa (Switzerland) Benjamin Leuenberger	Audi 4.0 L V8	MI	145
42 DNF	GT1	55	(Russia) IPB Spartak Racing (Germany) Reiter Engineering	(Netherlands) Peter Kox (Russia) Roman Rusinov	Lamborghini Murciélago R-GT	MI	131
42 DNF	GT1	55	(Russia) IPB Spartak Racing (Germany) Reiter Engineering	(Netherlands) Peter Kox (Russia) Roman Rusinov	Lamborghini L535 6.0 L V12	MI	131
43 DNF	LMP2	37	(France) WR Salini	(France) Stéphane Salini (France) Philippe Salini (France) Patrice Roussel	WR LMP2008	D	126
43 DNF	LMP2	37	(France) WR Salini	(France) Stéphane Salini (France) Philippe Salini (France) Patrice Roussel	Zytek ZG348 3.4 L V8	D	126
44 DNF	GT2	91	(Germany) Farnbacher Racing	(Denmark) Lars-Erik Nielsen (Denmark) Allan Simonsen (United Kingdom) Richard Westbrook	Porsche 997 GT3-RSR	MI	101
44 DNF	GT2	91	(Germany) Farnbacher Racing	(Denmark) Lars-Erik Nielsen (Denmark) Allan Simonsen (United Kingdom) Richard Westbrook	Porsche 4.0 L Flat-6	MI	101
45 DNF	LMP1	16	(France) Pescarolo Sport	(France) Emmanuel Collard (France) Jean-Christophe Boullion	Pescarolo 01	MI	97
45 DNF	LMP1	16	(France) Pescarolo Sport	(France) Emmanuel Collard (France) Jean-Christophe Boullion	Judd GV5.5 S2 5.5 L V10	MI	97
46 DNF	GT1	73	(France) Luc Alphand Aventures	(France) Jérôme Policand (Monaco) Olivier Beretta	Chevrolet Corvette C6.R	MI	50
46 DNF	GT1	73	(France) Luc Alphand Aventures	(France) Jérôme Policand (Monaco) Olivier Beretta	Chevrolet LS7-R 7.0 L V8	MI	50

† - Both #6 Team Oreca-Matmut and #21 Epsilon Euskadi failed to complete the final lap of the race, therefore they are not classified in the final results.

== Statistics ==
- Pole Position - #7 Team Peugeot Total - 1:39.492
- Fastest Lap - #7 Team Peugeot Total - 1:40.501
- Average Speed - 174.227 kilometres per hour (108.260 mph)

Le Mans Series
Previous race: 2008 1000km of Spa	2008 season	Next race: 2008 1000km of Silverstone
