= Welter Racing WR LMP2008 =

French sports prototype race car

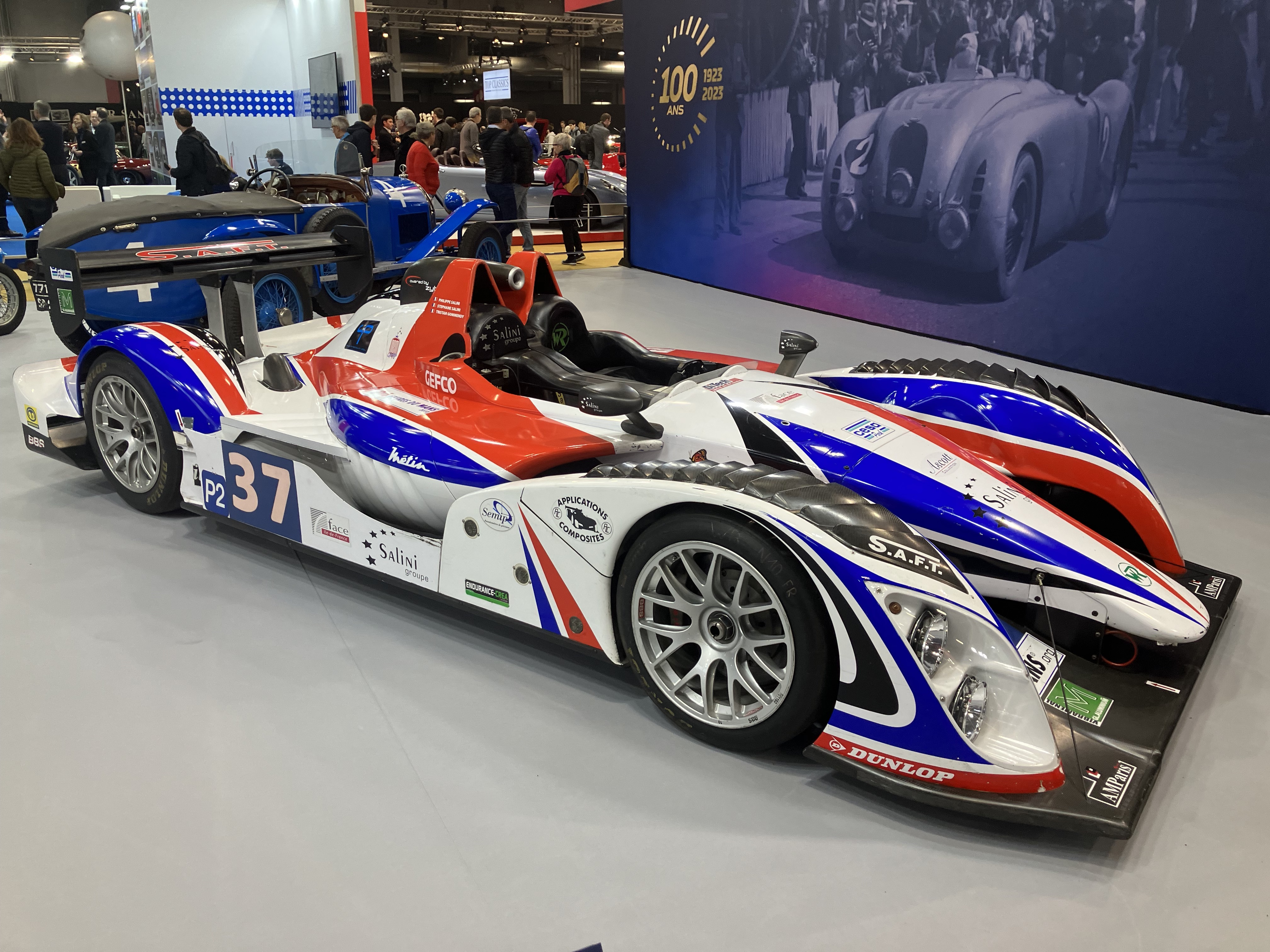
- Category: Le Mans Prototype
- Constructor: Welter Racing
- Designers: Gérard Welter; Jean-Christophe Bolle-Reddat

Technical specifications
- Chassis: Carbon fiber and aluminum honeycomb monocoque
- Length: 4,550 mm (179 in)
- Width: 2,000 mm (79 in)
- Wheelbase: 2,890 mm (114 in)
- Engine: Mid-engine, longitudinally mounted, 3.4 L (207.5 cu in), Zytek ZG348, 90° V8, DOHC, NA
- Transmission: Ricardo 6-speed sequential manual
- Power: 540 hp (403 kW); 325 lb⋅ft (441 N⋅m)
- Weight: 825 kg (1,819 lb)

Competition history
- Notable entrants: (France) Welter Racing
- Notable drivers: (France) Philippe Salini (France) Stéphane Salini (France) Tristan Gommendy (France) Bruce Jouanny (France) Patrice Roussel
- Debut: 2008 1000 km of Catalunya
- Last event: 2010 24 Hours of Le Mans
Races	Wins	Podiums	Poles	F/Laps
11	0	0	0	0
- Teams' Championships: 0
- Constructors' Championships: 0
- Drivers' Championships: 0

The Welter Racing WR LMP2008 is an LMP sports prototype race car, designed, developed and built by French racing team Welter Racing, for sports car racing, in 2008. It is powered by a Zytek ZG348 engine which develops a power of approximately 540 hp (400 kW) @ 9,500 rpm, for a torque of 441 N⋅m (325 lb⋅ft) @ 8,000 rpm. In 2008, it competed in the European 2008 Le Mans Series.
