= Epsilon Euskadi ee1 =

Sport racing car constructed by the Spanish constructor Epsilon Euskadi

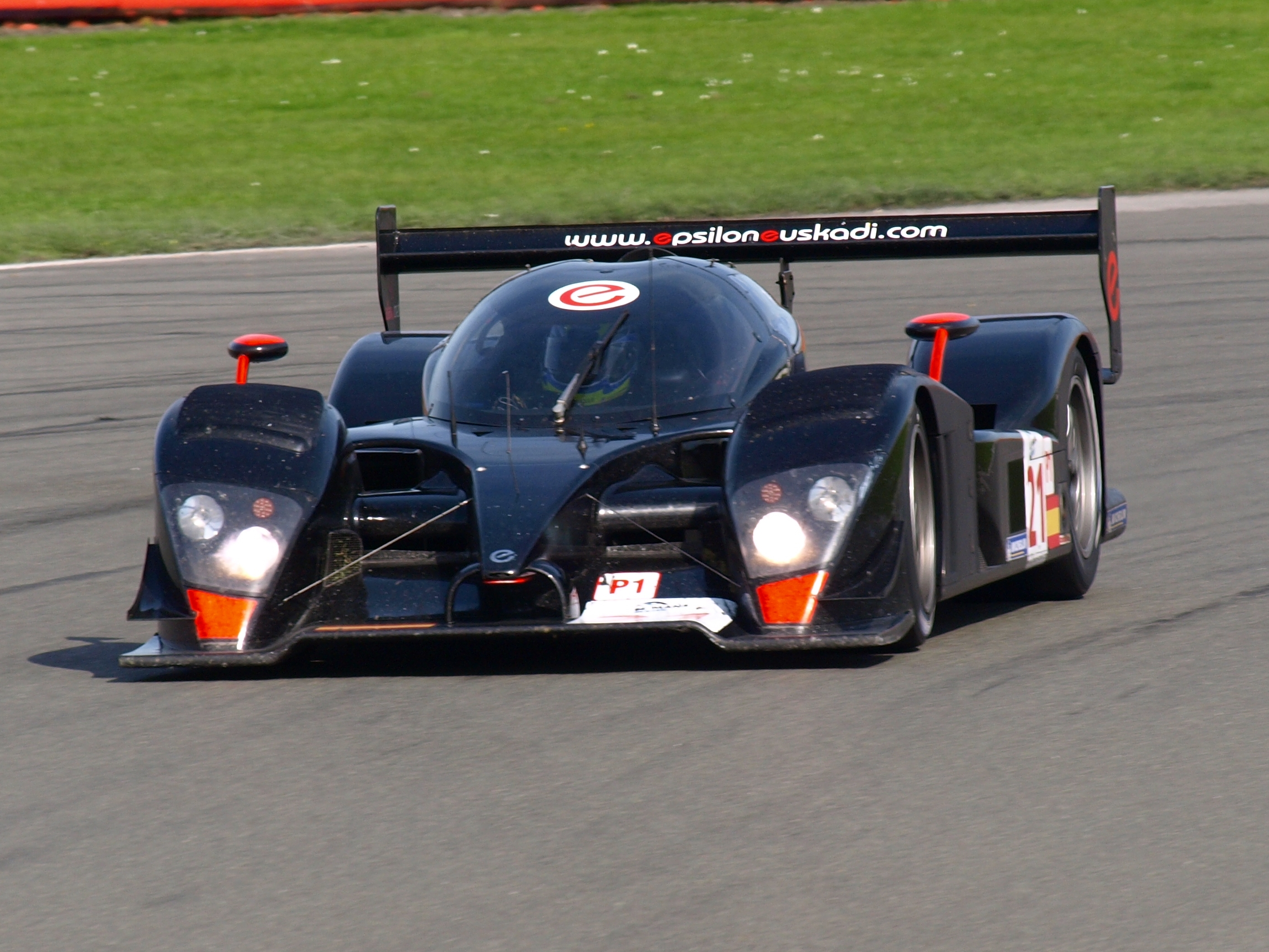
- Category: Le Mans Prototype LMP1
- Constructor: Epsilon Euskadi (YCOM)
- Designer: John Travis

Technical specifications
- Chassis: Carbon fiber monocoque
- Suspension (front): Independent double wishbones, push-rod actuated coil springs over dampers, anti-roll bar
- Suspension (rear): Independent double wishbones, push-rod actuated coil springs over dampers, anti-roll bar
- Axle track: Front: 1,684 mm (66.3 in); Rear: 1,571 mm (61.9 in)
- Wheelbase: 2,980 mm (117 in)
- Engine: Judd GV5.5 S2 5,496 cc (335.4 cu in) 72-degree V10 naturally aspirated, mid-engine, longitudinally mounted
- Transmission: Ricardo 6-speed sequential manual Multiple-disc limited-slip differential
- Weight: Approximately 900 kg (2,000 lb)
- Fuel: Shell
- Tyres: Michelin

Competition history
- Notable entrants: (Spain) Epsilon Euskadi
- Notable drivers: (Spain) Ángel Burgueño (Spain) Miguel Ángel de Castro (Spain) Adrián Vallés (Japan) Shinji Nakano (Sweden) Stefan Johansson (France) Jean-Marc Gounon
- Debut: 2008 1000 km of Catalunya
Races	Wins	Poles	F/Laps
6	0	0	0

The Epsilon Euskadi ee1 is a racing car from the Spanish constructor Epsilon Euskadi. It is designed and constructed for sports car racing in the Le Mans Prototype LMP1 class of the 24 Hours of Le Mans, and other similar endurance races.

== 2008 ==
The Epsilon Euskadi ee1 made its racing début at the 2008 1000km of Catalunya. Epsilon Euskadi entered in just one car which was the #20 car driven by Ángel Burgueño and Miguel Ángel de Castro. In the race, it managed to finish but only in 32nd, third last in the finishers after only completing 167 laps at their home race. In the end, Epsilon Euskadi only picked up two points in the five round season coming from the 2008 1000km of Spa when they finished eleventh overall and seventh in their class completing 133 laps.

=== Le Mans ===
For the 2008 24 Hours of Le Mans, Epsilon Euskadi entered two cars for the race, the #20 car driven by Ángel Burgueño, Miguel Ángel de Castro and Adrián Vallés and the #21 car driven by Shinji Nakano, Stefan Johansson and Jean-Marc Gounon. Qualifying went well, the #21 car qualified 15th with a best time of 3:32.939 and the #20 car qualified 17th with a best time of 3:34.281. In the race, the all-black ee1 looked competitive but both cars had mechanical problems and had to retire. The #21 car was the first of the two to retire after completing 158 laps then the #20 car retired after completing 189 laps.
