= Zytek ZG348 engine =

Zytek ZG348

Overview
- Manufacturer: (United Kingdom) Zytek
- Production: 2002–2012

Layout
- Configuration: 90° V8 naturally-aspirated
- Displacement: 3.4–4.0 L (207–244 cu in)
- Valvetrain: DOHC

RPM range
- Max. engine speed: 10,000 rpm

Combustion
- Fuel system: Electronic indirect multi-point injection
- Management: Zytek EMS 4.5
- Fuel type: Elf LMS 102 RON unleaded petrol

Output
- Power output: 530–540 hp (395–403 kW) @ 9,500 rpm
- Torque output: 325–330 lb⋅ft (441–447 N⋅m) @ 8,000-8,500 rpm

Dimensions
- Dry weight: 120 kg (265 lb)

Chronology
- Predecessor: Zytek ZB408
- Successor: Gibson GK428

The Zytek ZG348 engine is a 3.4-litre, normally-aspirated, V8 racing engine, developed and produced by Zytek for sports car racing. The ZG348's rev-limit was about 10,000 rpm, and produces its power output of 530–540 hp (395–403 kW) @ 9,500 rpm, and peak torque of 440 N⋅m (325 ft⋅lbf) @ 8,500 rpm.

== Applications ==
- Reynard 02S
- Ginetta G50
- Ginetta-Zytek GZ09S
