= Diesel automobile racing =

Diesel automobile racing can refer to any use of diesel as a fuel for racing cars. The diesel-fueled vehicle may be used in direct competition with other vehicles, in a separate Diesel class in the same racing event, or in a diesel-only event.

Diesel is not normally preferred for speed racing, due to the generally higher weight compared to a petrol-driven vehicle. However, diesel vehicles may in some events be classed independently of other competitors. In motorsports such as off-road trials or truck racing, diesel may be more predominant. In endurance racing, the broad power band, high torque and fuel economy can prove advantageous.

== History ==
In 1931, Dave Evans drove his Cummins Diesel Special to a non-stop finish in the Indianapolis 500, the first time a car completed a race without a pit stop. That car and a later Cummins Diesel Special are on display at the Indianapolis Motor Speedway Hall of Fame Museum. In 1934 Cummins designed a second car to race at the Indianapolis 500 with a much improved fuel metering system.

The Delettrez brothers competed in the 1949 24 Hours of Le Mans in a 4.4L engined car, but did not finish.

In the late 1970s, Mercedes-Benz drove a C111-III with a five-cylinder diesel engine to several new records at the Nardò Ring, including driving at an average of 314 km/h (195 mph) for 12 hours and hitting a top speed of 325 km/h (201 mph).

With turbocharged diesel cars getting stronger in the 1990s, they were entered in touring car racing, and BMW won the 24 Hours Nürburgring in 1998 with a 320d.

2008 Audi R10 TDI
Audi R10 TDI at Goodwood Festival of Speed 2009

After winning the 12 Hours of Sebring in 2006 with the diesel-powered R10 TDI LMP, Audi won the 24 Hours of Le Mans, too. This was the first time a diesel-fueled vehicle had won at Le Mans against cars powered with regular fuel or other alternative fuel like methanol or bio-ethanol. French automaker Peugeot, which has a strong Diesel tradition (as such similar to and in competition with Mercedes-Benz on the automotive market), entered the diesel powered Peugeot 908 HDi FAP LMP in the 2007 24 Hours of Le Mans in response to the success of the Audi R10 TDI. But Audi won the race again and for the third consecutive time in 2008, until two 908 finally won the first places in 2009. In 2008 Audi used next generation 10% BTL biodiesel manufactured from biomass. Despite the success of the 908 in 2009, all four Peugeot involved in the Le Mans 2010 race experienced some issues. And in 2011, the new Audi R18 wins over four other Peugeot 908 (respectively, 1st and second to fifth place).

In an effort to further demonstrate the potential of diesel power, California-based Gale Banks Engineering built and raced a Cummins-powered pickup at the Bonneville Salt Flats in October 2002. The truck set a top speed of 355 km/h (222 mph) and became the world’s fastest pickup, and the truck drove to the flats towing its own support trailer.

On 23 August 2006, the British-based earth moving machine manufacturer JCB raced the specially designed JCB Dieselmax car at 563.4 km/h (350.1 mph). The driver was Andy Green and the car was powered by two modified JCB 444 diesel engines.

In 2007, SEAT - with the SEAT León Mk2 at the Oschersleben Motorsport Arena in Germany - became the first manufacturer to win a round of the WTCC series in a diesel car, only a month after announcing it would enter the FIA World Touring Car Championship with the Leon TDI. SEAT's success with the León TDI was continued and resulted in winning both 2009 FIA WTCC championship titles (for drivers as well as for manufacturers).

In 2007, Wes Anderson drove the Gale Banks Engineering built 1250 horsepower Chevrolet S-10 diesel-powered Pro-Stock pick-up to a National Hot Rod Diesel Association record of 7.72 seconds at 179-mph for the quarter-mile.

In 2007 Top Gear as well as another rival team drove diesel BMW 3 series in the Britcar 24 hour race. They took place third in their class.
