= 2006 Monterey Sports Car Championships =

10th race of the 2006 American Le Mans Series

Track map of Mazda Raceway Laguna Seca

The 2006 Monterey Sports Car Championships at Mazda Raceway Laguna Seca was the final race for the 2006 American Le Mans Series season. It took place on October 21, 2006.

== Official results ==
Class winners in bold. Cars failing to complete 70% of winner's distance marked as Not Classified (NC).

Pos	Class	No	Team	Drivers	Chassis	Tyre	Laps
Pos	Class	No	Team	Drivers	Engine	Tyre	Laps
1	**LMP1**	**2**	**(United States) Audi Sport North America**	**(United Kingdom) Allan McNish (Italy) Rinaldo Capello**	**Audi R10 TDI**	M	**159**
1	**LMP1**	**2**	**(United States) Audi Sport North America**	**(United Kingdom) Allan McNish (Italy) Rinaldo Capello**	**Audi TDI 5.5L Turbo V12 (Diesel)**	M	**159**
2	LMP1	1	(United States) Audi Sport North America	(Germany) Frank Biela (Italy) Emanuele Pirro	Audi R10 TDI	M	159
2	LMP1	1	(United States) Audi Sport North America	(Germany) Frank Biela (Italy) Emanuele Pirro	Audi TDI 5.5L Turbo V12 (Diesel)	M	159
3	LMP1	88	(United Kingdom) Creation Autosportif	(France) Nicolas Minassian (Switzerland) Harold Primat	Creation CA06/H	M	159
3	LMP1	88	(United Kingdom) Creation Autosportif	(France) Nicolas Minassian (Switzerland) Harold Primat	Judd GV5 S2 5.0L V10	M	159
4	**LMP2**	**7**	**(United States) Penske Racing**	**(Germany) Lucas Luhr (France) Romain Dumas**	**Porsche RS Spyder**	M	**159**
4	**LMP2**	**7**	**(United States) Penske Racing**	**(Germany) Lucas Luhr (France) Romain Dumas**	**Porsche MR6 3.4L V8**	M	**159**
5	LMP2	6	(United States) Penske Racing	(Germany) Sascha Maassen (Germany) Timo Bernhard	Porsche RS Spyder	M	158
5	LMP2	6	(United States) Penske Racing	(Germany) Sascha Maassen (Germany) Timo Bernhard	Porsche MR6 3.4L V8	M	158
6	LMP1	16	(United States) Dyson Racing	(United Kingdom) James Weaver (United States) Chris Dyson	Lola B06/10	M	158
6	LMP1	16	(United States) Dyson Racing	(United Kingdom) James Weaver (United States) Chris Dyson	AER P32T 3.6L Turbo V8	M	158
7	LMP1	15	(United Kingdom) Zytek Engineering	(United Kingdom) Johnny Mowlem (Sweden) Stefan Johansson	Zytek 06S	M	157
7	LMP1	15	(United Kingdom) Zytek Engineering	(United Kingdom) Johnny Mowlem (Sweden) Stefan Johansson	Zytek 2ZG408 4.0L V8	M	157
8	**GT1**	**009**	**(United Kingdom) Aston Martin Racing**	**(France) Stéphane Sarrazin (Portugal) Pedro Lamy**	**Aston Martin DBR9**	P	**153**
8	**GT1**	**009**	**(United Kingdom) Aston Martin Racing**	**(France) Stéphane Sarrazin (Portugal) Pedro Lamy**	**Aston Martin 6.0L V12**	P	**153**
9	GT1	4	(United States) Corvette Racing	(United Kingdom) Oliver Gavin (Monaco) Olivier Beretta	Chevrolet Corvette C6.R	M	153
9	GT1	4	(United States) Corvette Racing	(United Kingdom) Oliver Gavin (Monaco) Olivier Beretta	Chevrolet 7.0L V8	M	153
10	GT1	3	(United States) Corvette Racing	(Canada) Ron Fellows (United States) Johnny O'Connell	Chevrolet Corvette C6.R	M	152
10	GT1	3	(United States) Corvette Racing	(Canada) Ron Fellows (United States) Johnny O'Connell	Chevrolet 7.0L V8	M	152
11	GT1	007	(United Kingdom) Aston Martin Racing	(Czech Republic) Tomáš Enge (United Kingdom) Darren Turner	Aston Martin DBR9	P	152
11	GT1	007	(United Kingdom) Aston Martin Racing	(Czech Republic) Tomáš Enge (United Kingdom) Darren Turner	Aston Martin 6.0L V12	P	152
12	LMP2	37	(United States) Intersport Racing	(United States) Jon Field (United States) Clint Field (United Kingdom) Liz Halliday	Lola B05/40	G	151
12	LMP2	37	(United States) Intersport Racing	(United States) Jon Field (United States) Clint Field (United Kingdom) Liz Halliday	AER P07 2.0L Turbo I4	G	151
13	**GT2**	**62**	**(United States) Risi Competizione**	**(Finland) Mika Salo (France) Stephane Ortelli**	**Ferrari F430GT**	M	**149**
13	**GT2**	**62**	**(United States) Risi Competizione**	**(Finland) Mika Salo (France) Stephane Ortelli**	**Ferrari 4.0L V8**	M	**149**
14	GT2	31	(United States) Petersen Motorsports (United States) White Lightning Racing	(Germany) Jörg Bergmeister (United States) Patrick Long (United States) Mike Petersen	Porsche 911 GT3-RSR	M	149
14	GT2	31	(United States) Petersen Motorsports (United States) White Lightning Racing	(Germany) Jörg Bergmeister (United States) Patrick Long (United States) Mike Petersen	Porsche 3.6L Flat-6	M	149
15	LMP2	8	(United States) B-K Motorsport	(United States) Jamie Bach (United States) Guy Cosmo	Courage C65	K	149
15	LMP2	8	(United States) B-K Motorsport	(United States) Jamie Bach (United States) Guy Cosmo	Mazda R20B 2.0L 3-Rotor	K	149
16	GT2	23	(United States) Alex Job Racing	(Germany) Mike Rockenfeller (Germany) Marcel Tiemann	Porsche 911 GT3-RSR	M	148
16	GT2	23	(United States) Alex Job Racing	(Germany) Mike Rockenfeller (Germany) Marcel Tiemann	Porsche 3.6L Flat-6	M	148
17	GT2	44	(United States) Flying Lizard Motorsports	(United States) Darren Law (United States) Seth Neiman	Porsche 911 GT3-RSR	M	147
17	GT2	44	(United States) Flying Lizard Motorsports	(United States) Darren Law (United States) Seth Neiman	Porsche 3.6L Flat-6	M	147
18	GT2	51	(Canada) Multimatic Motorsports Team Panoz	(United States) Gunnar Jeannette (United States) Tommy Milner	Panoz Esperante GT-LM	P	146
18	GT2	51	(Canada) Multimatic Motorsports Team Panoz	(United States) Gunnar Jeannette (United States) Tommy Milner	Ford (Elan) 5.0L V8	P	146
19	GT2	45	(United States) Flying Lizard Motorsports	(United States) Johannes van Overbeek (Germany) Wolf Henzler	Porsche 911 GT3-RSR	M	141
19	GT2	45	(United States) Flying Lizard Motorsports	(United States) Johannes van Overbeek (Germany) Wolf Henzler	Porsche 3.6L Flat-6	M	141
20	GT2	61	(United States) Risi Competizione	(Italy) Maurizio Mediani (Italy) Andrea Bertolini	Ferrari F430GT	M	140
20	GT2	61	(United States) Risi Competizione	(Italy) Maurizio Mediani (Italy) Andrea Bertolini	Ferrari 4.0L V8	M	140
21 DNF	GT2	21	(United States) BMW Team PTG	(United States) Bill Auberlen (United States) Joey Hand	BMW M3	Y	139
21 DNF	GT2	21	(United States) BMW Team PTG	(United States) Bill Auberlen (United States) Joey Hand	BMW 3.2L I6	Y	139
22	LMP2	76	(United Kingdom) Team Bruichladdich Radical	(United Kingdom) Stuart Moseley (Netherlands) Michael Vergers	Radical SR9	D	134
22	LMP2	76	(United Kingdom) Team Bruichladdich Radical	(United Kingdom) Stuart Moseley (Netherlands) Michael Vergers	AER P07 2.0L Turbo I4	D	134
23	LMP1	12	(United States) Autocon Motorsport	(United States) Mike Lewis (United States) Bryan Willman (United States) John Graham	MG-Lola EX257	D	128
23	LMP1	12	(United States) Autocon Motorsport	(United States) Mike Lewis (United States) Bryan Willman (United States) John Graham	AER P07 2.0L Turbo I4	D	128
24 DNF	LMP2	19	(United States) Van der Steur Racing	(United States) Gunnar van der Steur (United Kingdom) Ben Devlin (United States) Adam Pecorari	Radical SR9	K	100
24 DNF	LMP2	19	(United States) Van der Steur Racing	(United States) Gunnar van der Steur (United Kingdom) Ben Devlin (United States) Adam Pecorari	AER P07 2.0L Turbo I4	K	100
25 DNF	GT2	22	(United States) BMW Team PTG	(United States) Justin Marks (United States) Bryan Sellers (United States) Ian James	BMW M3	Y	80
25 DNF	GT2	22	(United States) BMW Team PTG	(United States) Justin Marks (United States) Bryan Sellers (United States) Ian James	BMW 3.2L I6	Y	80
26 DNF	LMP2	27	(Switzerland) Horag-Lista Racing	(Switzerland) Fredy Lienhard (Belgium) Didier Theys	Lola B05/40	M	78
26 DNF	LMP2	27	(Switzerland) Horag-Lista Racing	(Switzerland) Fredy Lienhard (Belgium) Didier Theys	Judd XV675 3.4L V8	M	78
27 DNF	GT2	50	(Canada) Multimatic Motorsports Team Panoz	(Canada) Scott Maxwell (Australia) David Brabham	Panoz Esperante GT-LM	P	76
27 DNF	GT2	50	(Canada) Multimatic Motorsports Team Panoz	(Canada) Scott Maxwell (Australia) David Brabham	Ford (Elan) 5.0L V8	P	76

== Statistics ==
- Pole Position - #15 Zytek Engineering - 1:13.731
- Fastest Lap - #7 Penske Racing - 1:14.157
- Distance - 355.842 miles (572.672 km)
- Average Speed - 88.678 mph (142.713 km/h)

American Le Mans Series
Previous race: 2006 Petit Le Mans	2006 season	Next race: None
