= Audi R10 TDI =

Sports prototype racing car by Audi

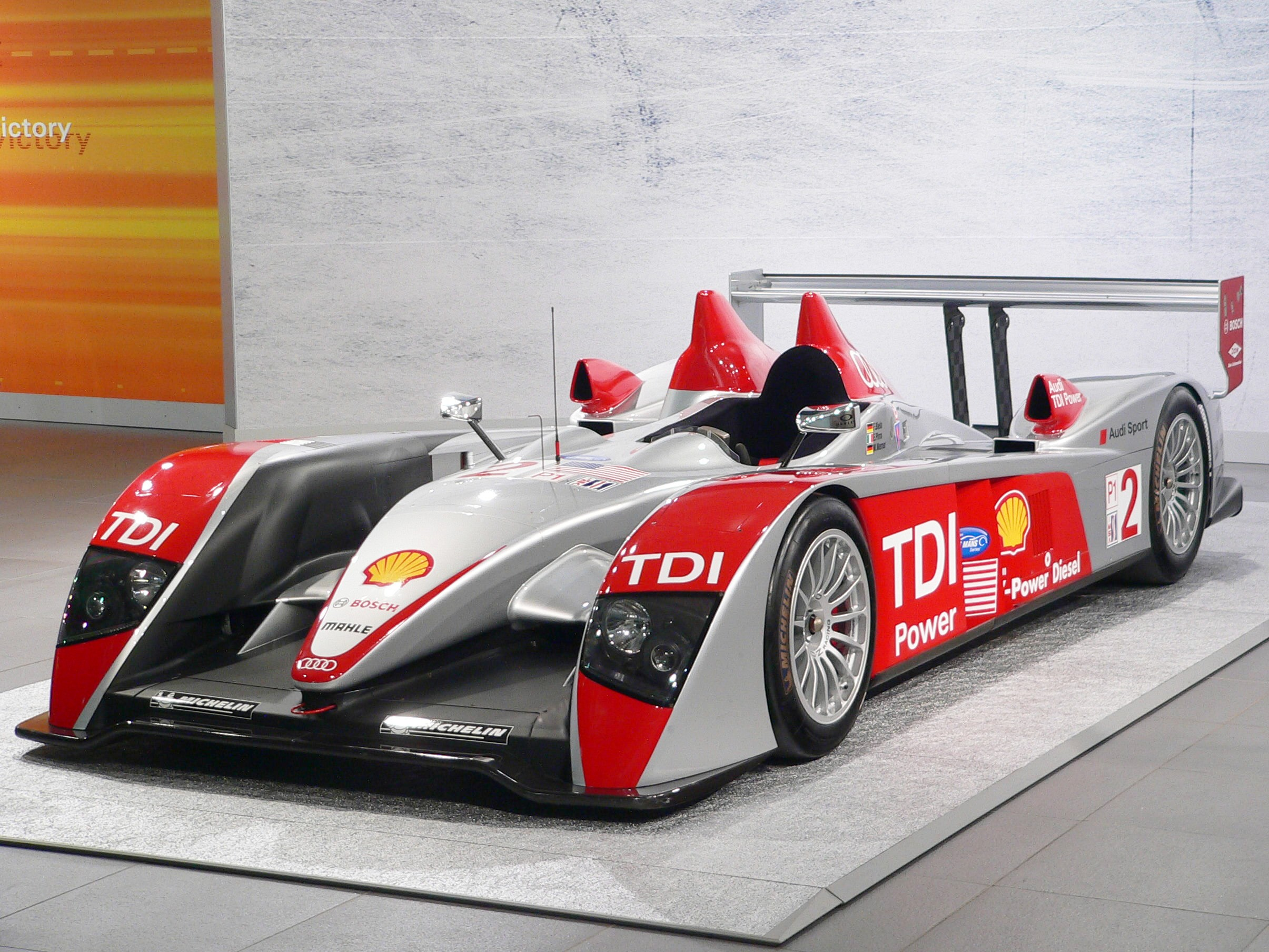
- The R10 TDI at the Neckarsulm AudiForum
- Category: LMP1
- Constructor: Audi (Dallara)
- Designers: Ralf Jüttner (technical director); Wolfgang Appel (head of chassis design)
- Predecessor: Audi R8
- Successor: Audi R15 TDI

Technical specifications
- Chassis: Carbon fibre monocoque with aluminium honeycomb
- Suspension (front): Double wishbone, coil springs and dampers with pushrods, anti-roll bar
- Suspension (rear): As front
- Length: 4,650 mm (183.1 in)
- Width: 2,000 mm (78.7 in)
- Height: 1,030 mm (40.6 in)
- Wheelbase: 2,980 mm (117.3 in)
- Engine: Audi TDI 5,500 cc (335.6 cu in) 90° DOHC 48-valve aluminium V12, twin-turbocharged, mid-engined, longitudinally mounted
- Torque: 1,100 N⋅m (811 lb⋅ft)
- Transmission: Audi with Xtrac-Megaline internals 5-speed pneumatically-actuated sequential manual transmission, with viscous-mechanical locking differential
- Power: ≥650 PS (641 hp; 478 kW)
- Weight: 925 kg (2,039 lb)
- Brakes: Ventilated carbon-fibre discs
- Tyres: Michelin radials with OZ forged magnesium alloy wheels

Competition history
- Notable entrants: Audi Sport Team Joest; Audi Sport North America; Kolles
- Notable drivers: 21: (Germany) Frank Biela; (Germany) Marco Werner; (Germany) Michael Krumm; (Germany) André Lotterer; (Germany) Lucas Luhr; (Germany) Mike Rockenfeller; (Italy) Emanuele Pirro; (Italy) Rinaldo Capello; (United Kingdom) Allan McNish; (United Kingdom) Andrew Meyrick; (United Kingdom) Oliver Jarvis; (Denmark) Tom Kristensen; (Denmark) Christian Bakkerud; (Netherlands) Charles Zwolsman Jr.; (Netherlands) Christijan Albers; (India) Narain Karthikeyan; (France) Alexandre Prémat; (France) Christophe Bouchut; (Switzerland) Giorgio Mondini; (Switzerland) Marcel Fässler; (United States) Scott Tucker
- Debut: 2006 12 Hours of Sebring
- Last event: 2010 24 Hours of Le Mans
Races	Wins	Poles	F/Laps
48	36	12	13
- Teams' Championships: 4 (American Le Mans 2006, 2007, 2008, Le Mans Series 2008)
- Constructors' Championships: 4 (American Le Mans 2006, 2007, 2008, Le Mans Series 2008)
- Drivers' Championships: 4 (American Le Mans 2006, 2007, 2008, Le Mans Series 2008)

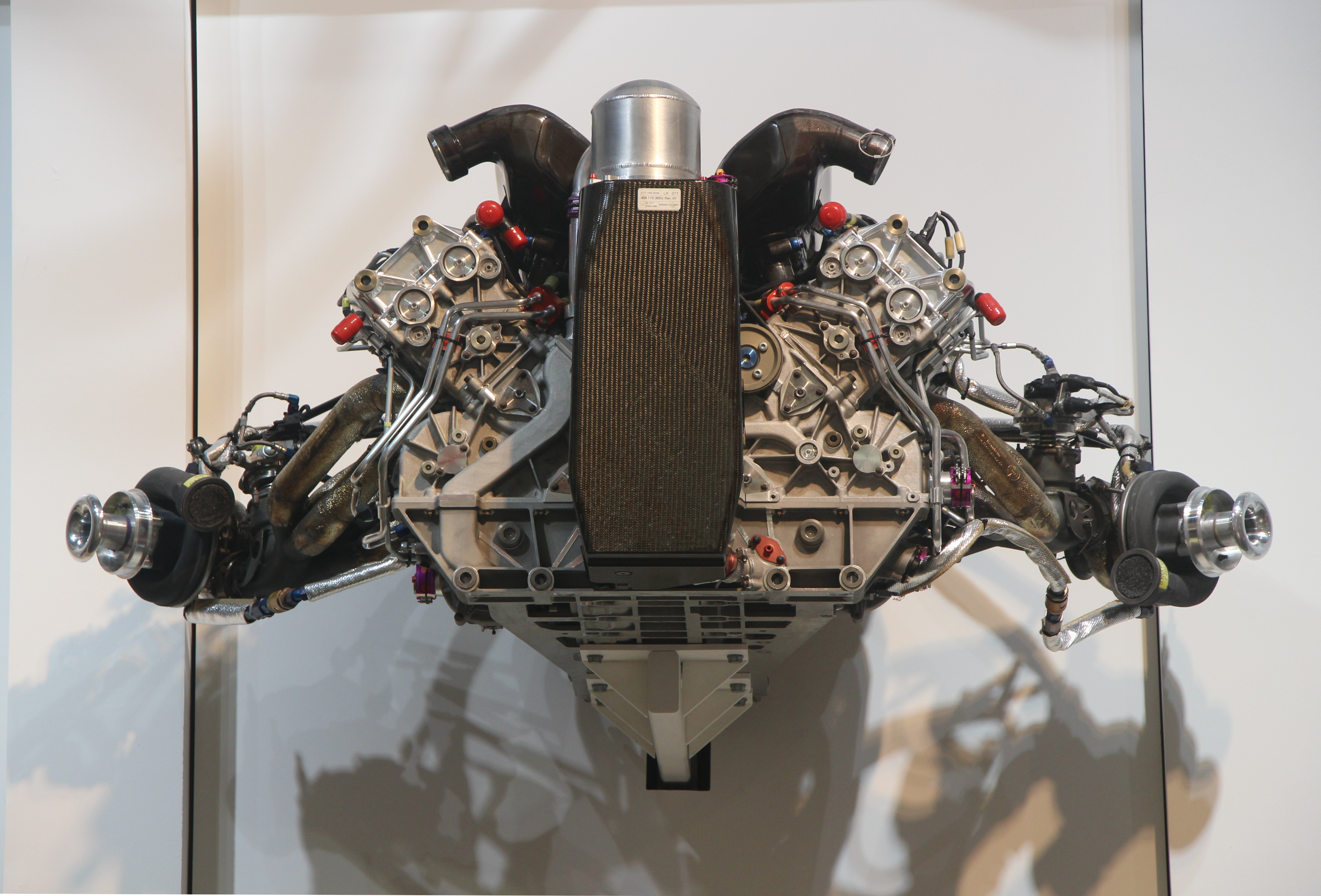
V12-Diesel-engine of the R10 TDI in the Deutsches Museum 2025

The Audi R10 TDI (Turbo Direct Injection) is a sports prototype designed and built by Audi in partnership with Dallara. Built to the Le Mans Prototype 1 (LMP1) regulations, the R10 was highly successful throughout its career; the R10 became the first diesel-powered car to win the 24 Hours of Le Mans in 2006, in what would be the first of three 24 Hours of Le Mans wins. Unveiled to the public on 13 December 2005 in Paris, the R10 would go on to win the 2006 24 Hours of Le Mans just 200 days later.

The R10 was eventually replaced by the R15 TDI at the conclusion of the 2008 American Le Mans Series. Colin Kolles of ByKolles Racing (known then as 'Kolles') fielded the car for two more years at Le Mans and for a single year in the 2009 Le Mans Series.

== Background ==
The R10's predecessor, the R8 Le Mans Prototype, was an open-cockpit design based on experience gained with the Audi R8R. The R8R's sibling, the closed-cockpit R8C, was not as successful as the R8R and Audi chose open-cockpits as their design philosophy, this remained the case until 2011, when the R18 TDI was unveiled with a closed-cockpit. A key difference between open- and closed-cockpit designs such as the Bentley Speed 8 was that the closed-cockpit prototypes of the LMGTP class ran with narrower tyres, but had larger air restrictors and thus produced more power compared to its fellow open-cockpit LMP1 cars.

The R8 proved to be one of the most successful sports prototypes of all time, dominating the LMP900 class from its introduction in 2000, scoring 63 victories from 79 races. Eventually, weight and air restrictor penalties resulted in the R8's competitors becoming increasingly closer on pace, for the 2005 edition of the 24 Hours of Le Mans the R8 was forced to carry 50 kg (110 lb) extra in ballast and had smaller air restrictors. These changes to the regulations meant that the V8 in the R8 LMP was becoming obsolete. The 2005 Le Mans Endurance Series finale at Istanbul saw the end to the R8's racing activities in Europe, however, akin to what was done with the R8R, the R8 replaced the R10 following the latter's debut at the 2006 12 Hours of Sebring until the 2006 24 Hours of Le Mans.

The R8 LMP was renowned for its serviceability, especially the rear assembly, which was nicknamed "Hinterwagen". The serviceability trend continued with the R10, with not only the rear bodywork being removable but the front crash structure too. The R10 carried over the R8's carbon fibre monocoque and aluminium honeycomb, with the plastic bodywork replaced by a carbon-fibre composite construction, necessitated by the increased weight of the V12 compared to the previous V8.

== Engine and transmission ==
2008 Audi R10 TDI
The Audi R10 TDI at the 2009 Goodwood Festival of Speed

Audi was not the first to campaign a diesel-powered car at the 24 Hours of Le Mans, with French brothers Jean and Jacques Delettrez being the first to field a diesel. They entered the 1949 24 Hours of Le Mans with a car that had bodywork by Delage and was powered by a 4.4 L (268.5 cu in) inline-6 producing 70 PS (69 hp; 51 kW). They retired after completing 1,660 km (1,031 mi), having run the starter motor battery dry after attempting to travel back to the pits after the car had run out of diesel.

After retiring with valve failure in 1951, the Delettrez brothers were the last diesel-powered entrant until privateers Taurus Sports Racing entered the 2004 24 Hours of Le Mans with a Lola B2K/10 that was powered by a 4,921 cc (300.3 cu in) V10 TDI from a Volkswagen Touareg. The first success of a diesel-powered race car was a BMW 320d that won the 1998 24 Hours of Nürburgring.

In January 2002, head of Engine Technology at Audi Sport Ulrich Baretsky sat down over a beer with Automobile Club de l'Ouest officials Daniel Poissoneaux and Daniel Perdrix in Ingolstadt to discuss the direction racing would take in the future. During that conversation Baretsky realised that 50% of European cars on the market were powered by diesel engines, prompting Baretsky to suggest to head of Engine Development at Audi Wolfgang Hatz the idea of a diesel-powered race car. Hatz supported the idea, citing how the technologies pioneered in a diesel-powered race car could be carried over into a road car, or vice versa, such as FSI technology which was being used in the R8 LMP's and Audi's road car engines. Wolfgang Ullrich, head of Audi Motorsport, also saw the potential in a diesel-powered race car, as the American Le Mans Series was part of Audi's competition calendar, and Audi was looking to introduce its diesel road car range to the United States. Ullrich wanted to change the stereotype of diesels being dirty and "oil-burners", and that he "wanted to push the sportiness of the diesel", and "the best way to do that was through motor sport [sic]." Then-chairman of the board of Audi AG Martin Winterkorn reiterated this during the car's presentation in Paris in 2005, saying "The Le Mans project will help our technicians to extract even more from TDI technology".

During the 2004 24 Hours of Le Mans, Baretsky met with the then-chairman of the supervisory board of Volkswagen, Ferdinand Piëch, who gave the project the go-ahead. The first engine prototype was a production-based Audi V8 with a similar bore and stroke to the V12 intended for use in the race car, and its first runs on the dyno came in early 2005. By the time of the R10's unveiling in December of that year, the engine was said to have completed around 1,000 hours on the dyno. The engine presented several unique challenges for Audi, one of which was the construction of the engine block. Wolfgang Appel, director of Vehicle Technology at Audi, compared the task to the Apollo program, saying "In the beginning they [the Americans] did not know what was going on, nor did we!" At the time, all of Audi's road car diesel engines used vermicular cast iron, and head of Audi Diesel Engine Development Richard Bauder suggested that like the road cars, the race car block should be machined from cast iron. Baretsky rejected the idea on the grounds that a cast iron block was too heavy, opting for an aluminium-silicon alloy block instead. The Bosch Motronic MS14 engine control unit (ECU) was also bespoke, with Bosch having never written software for an engine this powerful. A Bosch common rail fuel injection system with piezoelectric injectors delivered fuel into the cylinders at over 1,600 bar (23,206 psi), combined with a Garrett turbocharger for each bank (limited to 2.94 bar (42.6 psi)), resulted in a power output of over 650 PS (478 kW; 641 hp) between 3,000 and 5,000 rpm and a torque output of 1,100 N⋅m (811 lb⋅ft).

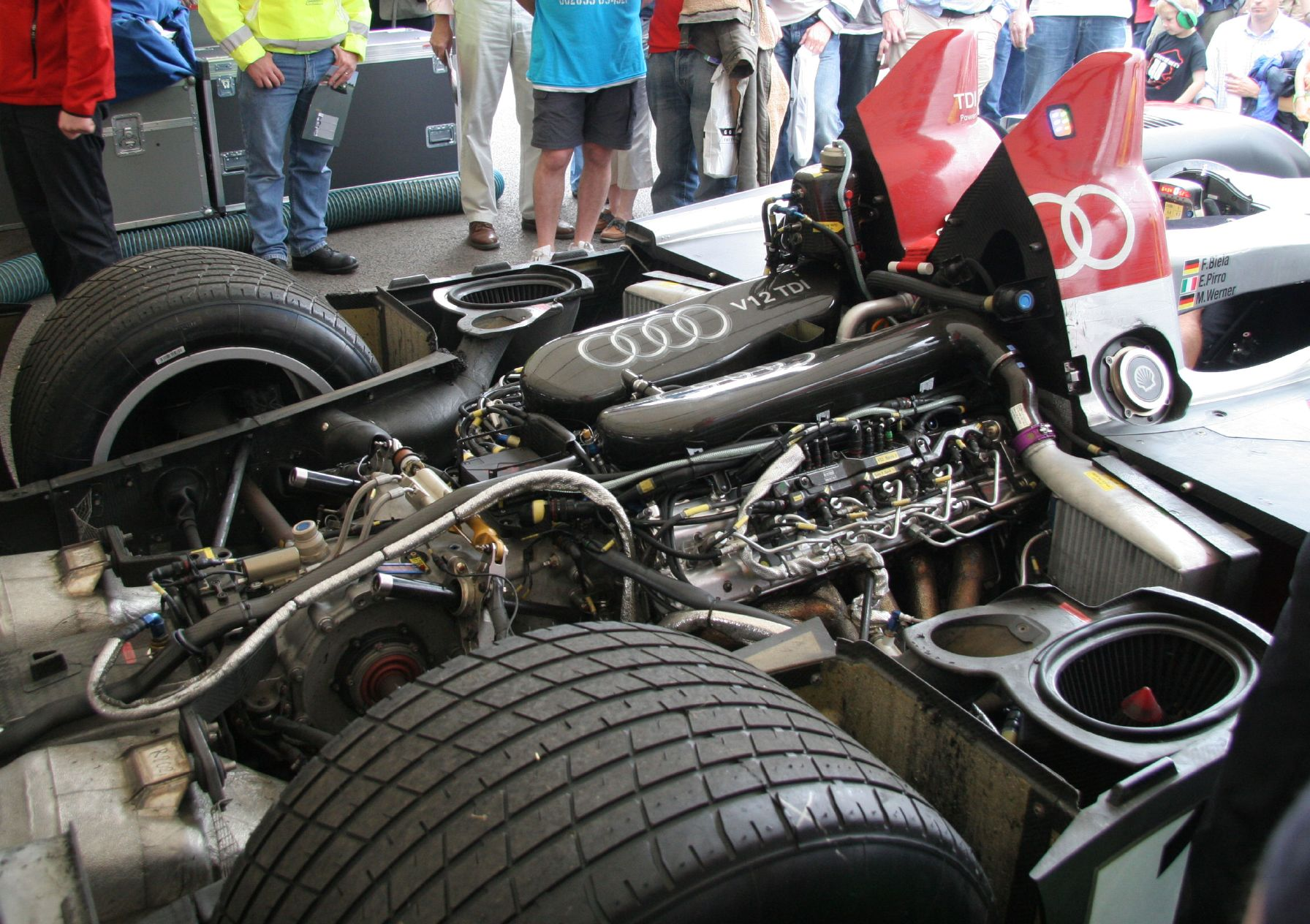
The R10's 5.5 litre V12 TDI diesel engine. The bottom left shows the diesel particulate filters developed by Dow Automotive.

Dow Automotive also developed and manufactured a specialised diesel particulate filter (DPF) for the R10. The particulate filter consisted of a chemically treated ceramic honeycomb structure, which had a distinct microstructure that reduced weight and had a high porosity. The filters were so efficient that exhausts from the engine were practically transparent, and the exhaust note was around 5 dB quieter than the R8, at 105 dB. Allan McNish said the exhaust was so quiet that above 161 km/h (100 mph), the sound of wind rushing by was louder than the engine itself, making downshifting hard to do by ear. A complication with the diesel particulate filters arose when deciding where to mount them; Audi eventually settling on mounting them aftwards at the end of the exhaust pipes. This somewhat disturbed the R10's weight distribution, with Baretsky commenting that "We'd be happier to have them [the filters] closer to the engine, but this would have put them in the middle of the rear axle". After the 2006 race, Baretsky was said to have wiped the inside of the No. 8's exhaust pipes whilst the car was in parc fermé, and Ralf Jüttner, team director of Joest Racing, remarked that afterwards "the napkins were as pristine-white as before".

The immense power produced by the engine also required a new gearbox. A favourable torque curve meant that a 6-speed like the one found in the R8 was unnecessary, and Xtrac provided a 5-speed pneumatically-actuated sequential with a ZF Sachs ceramic clutch, and Megaline supplied the gearbox control system. Despite the vastly superior torque, the new gearbox is lighter than the R8's gearbox. It is a thin walled aluminium casting, as opposed to its predecessor's Ricardo magnesium case. Bosch also supplied the car with its Acceleration Slip Regulation unit.

Along with the engine's high power and torque figures, its efficiency was among the highest in racing engines of its era. The car's fuel kilometrage at the 2006 and 2008 24 Hours of Le Mans was 41.05 L/100 km (5.73 mpg_{‑US}), and 45.56 L/100 km (5.16 mpg_{‑US}), respectively (the latter race being hampered by rain). In comparison, a 2007 Formula One car was said to have a fuel efficiency of around 75 L/100 km (3.14 mpg_{‑US}). This efficiency meant that the R10 was able to run longer stints than the R8, and proved to be integral to Audi's success at the Circuit de la Sarthe. Victory at the 2006 race saw Audi run 4 more laps per stint than its closest competitor, the petrol-powered Pescarolo-Judd, and victory at the 2008 24 Hours of Le Mans came courtesy of the diesel Peugeot 908 HDi FAP needing to pit a lap earlier than the R10 to take on fuel, despite being a quicker car.

== Racing history ==
=== 2006 ===
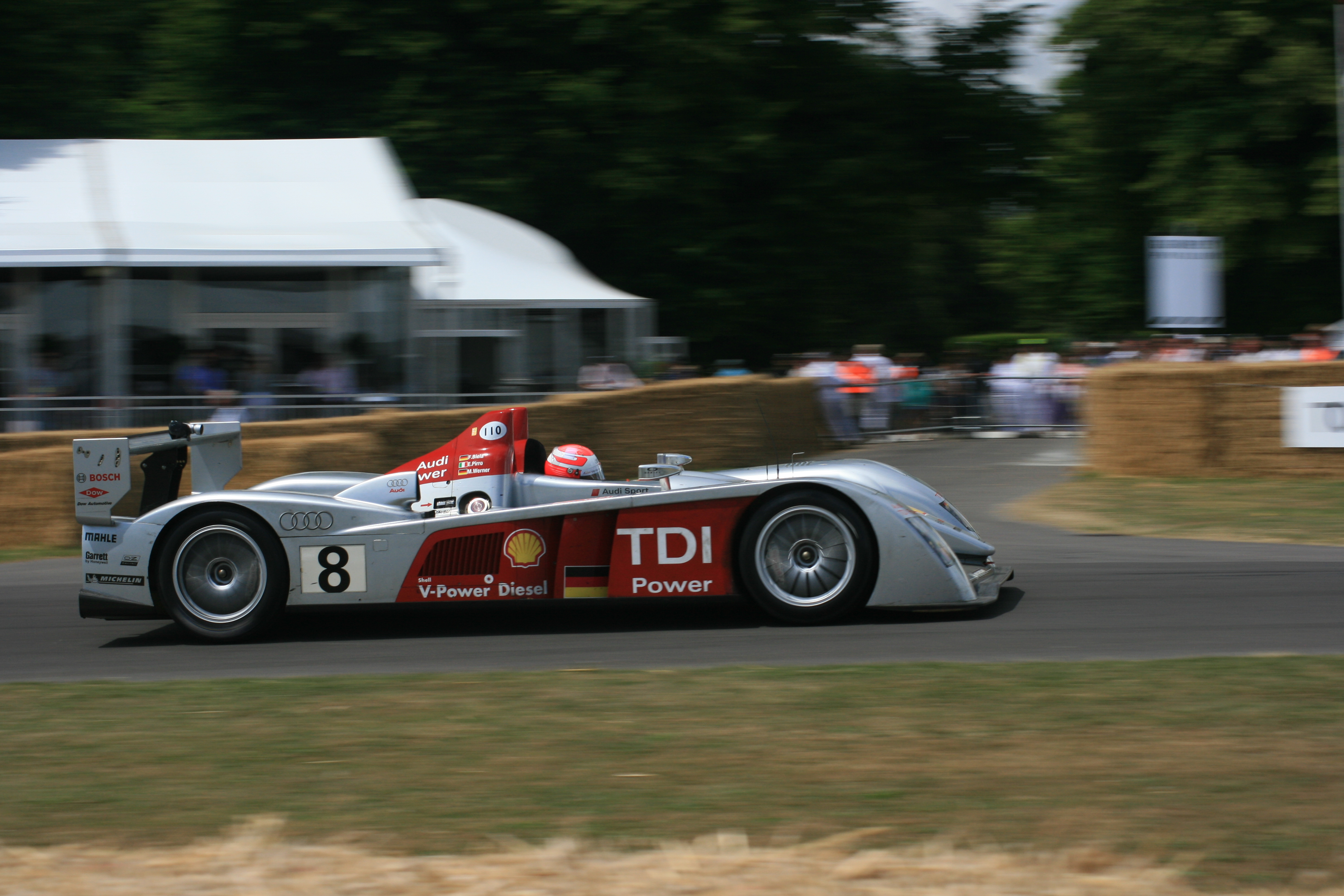
The 2006 24 Hour of Le Mans-winning No. 8 Audi R10 of Audi Sport Team Joest at the 2009 Goodwood Festival of Speed, driven by Marco Werner.

The R10's debut season saw Joest Racing handling the R10's Le Mans duties, and partner with Champion Racing at Sebring. Champion Racing continued to field the car in the American Le Mans Series, although the R10 was replaced by the R8 following Sebring and was not reintroduced until the fifth round of the season at the 2006 Utah Grand Prix. Sebring acted as a testing ground for Joest Racing as preparations in Europe began for that year's 24 Hours of Le Mans in June. Ullrich said the rationale behind fielding the older R8 was that the R10 project required more development, saying "We used Sebring as a testing ground, but until Le Mans was done we used the existing R8 in the US".

==== Le Mans ====
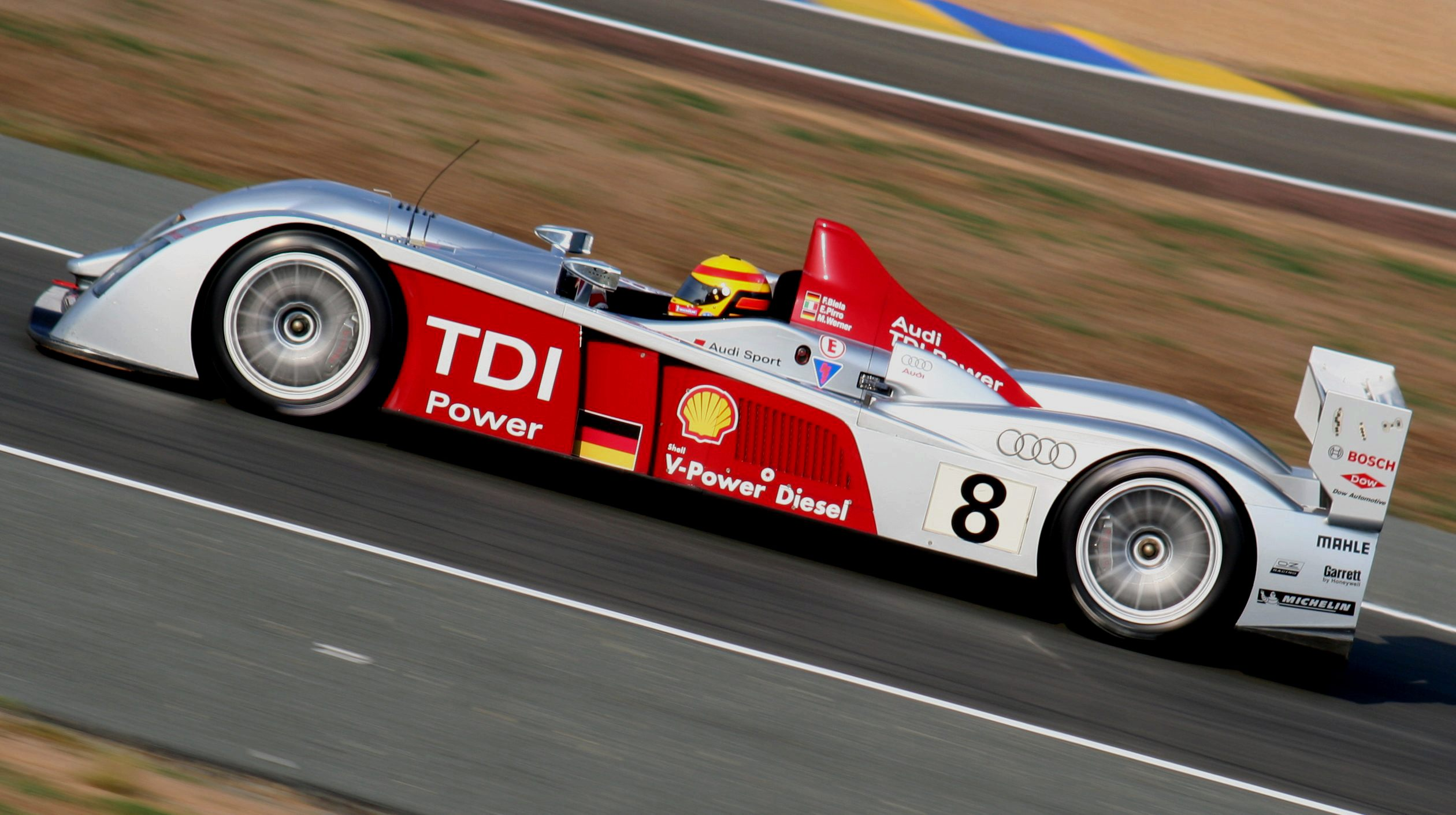
Frank Biela pilots the No. 8 on the Circuit de la Sarthe during qualifying practice, two days prior to the race.

Joest Racing's Le Mans campaign did not start off smoothly, with an issue with the piezo-electric injectors surfacing. The injectors behaved unusually during qualifying and the race, because of the constant development and modifications to the engine throughout 2006, Audi would be in constant communication with Bosch to try and resolve the problem. A temporary measure implemented was to limit the distance covered by each engines through qualifying, so as to preserve them for the race. Despite this, Rinaldo Capello put the No. 7 R10 on pole with a time of 3:30.466, alongside him was the sister No. 8, with Marco Werner setting a time of 3:30.584, over 2 seconds faster than the nearest petrol-hybrid Pescarolo-Judd C60s, which lined up in the second row.

The injector problem resurfaced during the race, with the No. 7 car coming into the pits in the fourth hour to replace an injector that had failed. The faulty injector held the car up for twenty minutes, because the software could not pinpoint exactly which injector had failed, only which bank it was in. Audi eventually replaced the entire right-hand bank of injectors, and the No. 7 rejoined in 14th place, six laps behind the leading No. 8. Repairs to fix contact with lapped traffic and turbo failure cost the No. 7 almost an hour in the pits, effectively ruling it out for the overall win.

The No. 8 was not affected by injector issues, with its only unscheduled appearance in the pit lane coming early in the morning of the following day for a gear cluster change. The No. 8 went on to take the overall win in a record 380 laps @ 215.4 km/h (133.8 mph), 4 laps ahead of the No. 17 Pescarolo-Judd, and the No. 7 sister Audi rounded out the podium, finishing 13 laps behind the leader. Kristensen also set the record for longest stint at the time in an LMP1 car, covering 16 laps in a single 90 L (23.8 US gal) tank of diesel, along with setting the fastest lap, clocking a 3:31.211 en route to his podium finish. The R10's victory was the first triumph of a diesel-powered race car in a major event since a Cummins Special qualified on pole for the 1953 Indianapolis 500, and the first diesel race car to win the 24 Hours of Le Mans. Pirro also extended his consecutive podium finishes to eight.

Following Audi's success at Le Mans, the R10 made a brief appearance in the United Kingdom for an exhibition race. Allan McNish was pitted against a Harrier Jump Jet at the RAF Wittering base during the 2006 Goodwood Festival of Speed. The R10 raced the jet from a standing start over a 1 km (0.6 mi) stretch of tarmac, and was the first of the two to reach 241 km/h (150 mph), shortly before the Harrier overtook the R10 and became airborne. McNish commented "It was essentialiy a 'fun' race," and that "when a racing driver and a pilot get together it quickly becomes serious".

==== American Le Mans Series ====
Champion Racing assumed responsibility for the R10's campaign in the American Le Mans Series as Audi Sport North America. Frank Biela and Emanuele Pirro were the No. 1 R10's regular drivers for the season, with Allan McNish and Rinaldo Capello regulars at the helm of the No. 2.

The R10 was quick straight away, with Rinaldo Capello breaking the Sebring lap record on the last day of winter testing, setting a time of 1:47.308. Capello, alongside Tom Kristensen and Allan McNish, piloted the No. 2 R10 for the opening round of the American Le Mans Series with Marco Werner, Emanuele Pirro, and Frank Biela piloting the sister No. 1 R10.

The No. 2 R10 broke the track lap record in qualifying en route to pole position at Sebring in an Audi front row lockout, but was forced to start from the pit lane because of an intercooler failure. The No. 2 dominated the race, leading every single lap of the race, giving Tom Kristensen a then record-breaking 4th overall win at Sebring. The No. 2 was Audi's sole podium finisher, the sister No. 1 suffering from cooling issues caused by tyre debris blocking a radiator. The No. 1 was retired four hours into the race as a precautionary measure.

At the inaugural 2006 Utah Grand Prix, Capello and McNish went into the race holding a comfortable lead in the championship standings as the R8 remained competitive, having been run for the previous three rounds. Biela qualified on pole, setting a time of 2:21.554. Biela lost the lead on the first lap to McNish at turn 4 after going wide, and run wide again at the final turn, losing more places. McNish maintained and extended his lead until he came into the pitlane on the 25th lap to swap seats with Capello. Capello regained the lead on the 49th lap but was forced to make an unscheduled pit stop with a tyre puncture on the 59th lap, ruling his crew out of overall contention. Pirro in the sister R10 made his way through the field following Biela's earlier mistakes, setting the fastest lap on the 51st lap en route to retaking the lead. Lucas Luhr in the No. 6 Porsche RS Spyder LMP2 followed closely behind, and an attempt to overtake Pirro on the last lap did not materialise, with Luhr finishing 0.314 seconds behind Pirro.

At the next round, the 2006 Portland Grand Prix, Butch Leitzinger put his No. 16 Lola B06/10 on pole with a 1:03.101, 0.132 s ahead of the No. 20 of his teammate, Guy Smith. The No. 2 R10 of Capello and McNish was the only Audi to crack the top four, qualifying behind the two Lolas with a 1:03.421, and the No. 1 started 5th with a 1:03.813. The two Audis swept the race, with both cars finishing two laps ahead of the nearest Lola. McNish took his 4th outright victory of the season, extending his championship lead to 39 points.

The governing body of the American Le Mans Series, the IMSA, made changes to the regulations before the Generac 500 at Road America, allowing the petrol-powered LMP1 cars to run 65 kg (143 lb) less than the diesel-powered cars. This meant that the petrol-powered LMP1s weighed 860 kg (1,896 lb), with the R10's weight unchanged at 925 kg (2,039 lb). The petrol-powered LMP1s also received a 5 L (1.32 US gal) fuel tank volume increase.

Despite the balance of performance shifting out of the R10's favour, they scored a front row lockout in qualifying. The No. 2 of McNish was the fastest of the two, setting a new track lap record with a 1:49.181, 1.386 seconds ahead of the sister No. 1. Shortly after the lights went out for the race, James Weaver of the No. 16 Lola B06/10 made contact with Biela, sending Biela into the gravel, causing him to drop down to 22nd after the first lap. The No. 7 RS Spyder of Luhr and Romain Dumas traded the lead with the No. 2 of McNish and Capello, however, a late restart enabled Pirro to take the chequered flag, four-tenths ahead of Capello. Capello

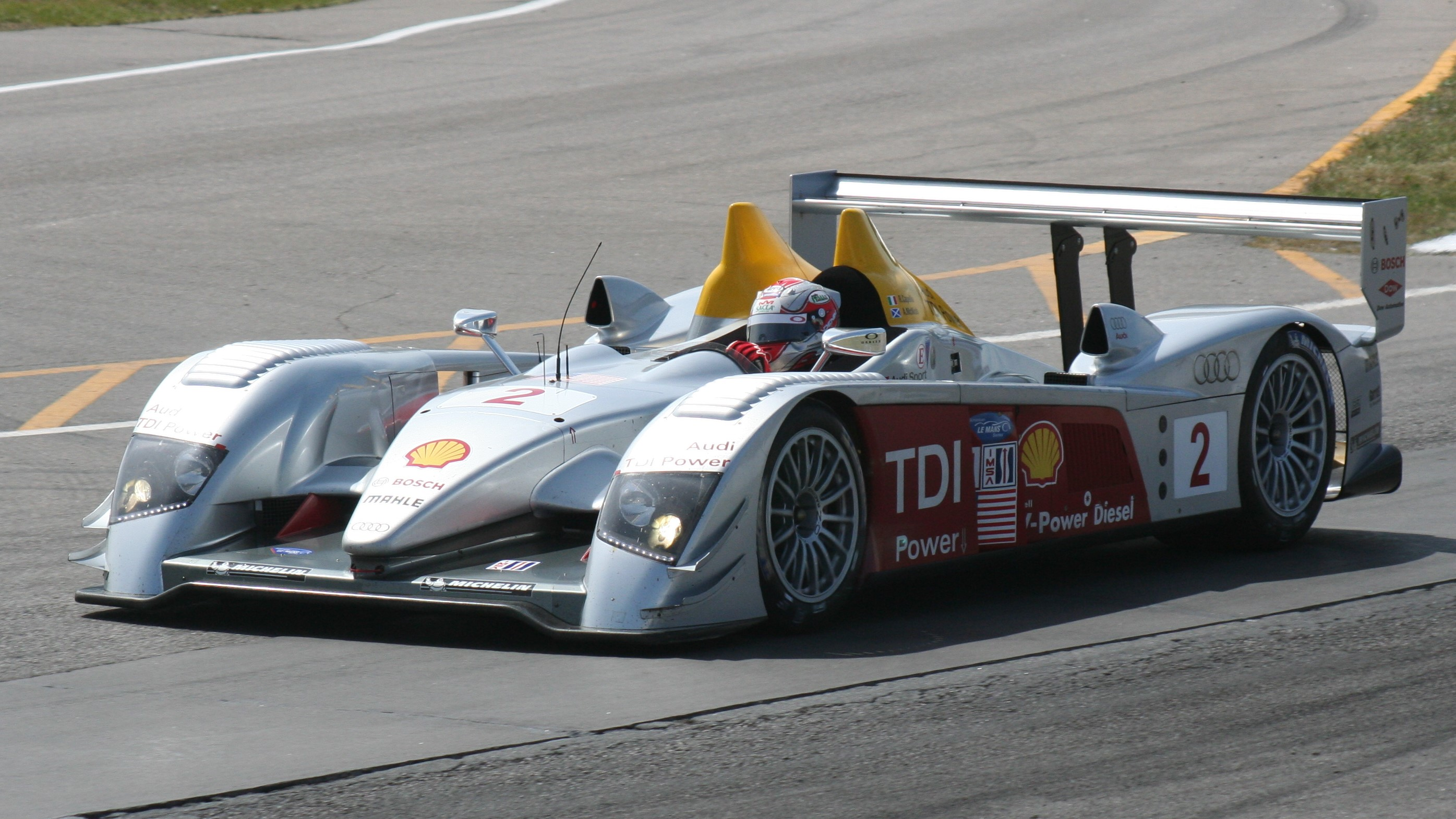
The No. 2 R10 TDI of Capello and McNish at the 2006 Grand Prix of Mosport

Rain cancelled qualifying for the 2006 Grand Prix of Mosport, and qualifying times were taken from each car's fastest time in practice. Weaver and Leitzinger qualified on pole, with a 1:06.843, with McNish and Capello alongside them in second. The No. 20 Lola B06/10 of Chris Dyson took the lead on the first lap, holding it until he had to pit on lap 27, remaining at the front until lap 46. The No. 2 of Capello took the lead from there, losing it briefly on lap 62 for the driver change, with McNish racing with the Dyson Lolas of Leitzinger and Smith. Despite McNish suffering from loss of grip due to picking up marbles on his tyres, which allowed Leitzinger to overtake him briefly, McNish retook the lead and finish first, 2.794 s ahead of the No. 20 Lola of Smith. With this victory, McNish and Capello extended their championship lead to 49 points, giving them the driver's championship. This was because even if Weaver and Leitzinger, their closest competitors, won the next two rounds, McNish and Capello were still driver champions since they scored more victories.

Petit Le Mans was their next race, with McNish lining up second on the front row of the grid next to Nicolas Minassian, who set a 1:10.829 in his Creation CA06/H. Minassian led the field until Werner in the No. 1 Audi overtook him on the 25th lap, with Werner himself then being overtaken by McNish in the sister No. 2. McNish and Capello battled with Stefan Johansson and Luhr in their No. 15 Zytek 06S and RS Spyder respectively, exchanging the lead several times. Smith in the No. 20 Lola B06/10 started to close in on Biela, but rear suspension failure sent him into a heavy shunt just before turn five, and a full-course yellow was shown as the debris was cleaned up. Johansson's co-driver, Haruki Kurosawa, briefly led on the 103rd lap before Biela retook the lead on the 104th lap. McNish later reeled Biela in, retaking the lead on the 155th lap, a lead he held until a brief interruption by Johansson from laps 258–267, taking the chequered flag. The sister No. 1 was close behind towards the finish, but contact with a backmarker 13 minutes before the end damaged the front suspension, forcing Werner to pit and lose time. The No. 1 crossed the finish line to place seventh overall, fifth in class.

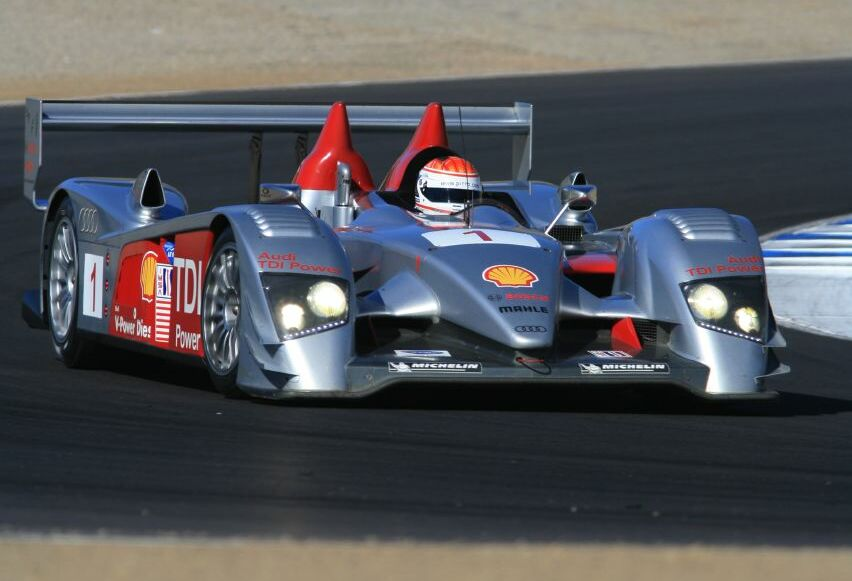
The R10 at the 2006 Monterey Sports Car Championships, with Emanuele Pirro at the wheel.

At the season finale at Laguna Seca, the No. 2 and No. 1 Audi qualified fourth and fifth, setting a time of 1:14.116 and 1:14.351, respectively. Johansson set a new lap record when he put his Zytek 06S on pole with a 1:13.731, over three tenths ahead of the No. 2. The beginning of the race saw both Audis lose significant time, Pirro in the No. 1 pitted on the third lap after an onboard camera became loose and fell into the footwell of the car, and McNish was issued with a stop-and-go penalty after causing contact going into Laguna Seca's famous "Corkscrew", forcing the team to replace his front fascia. A safety car allowed both cars to unlap themselves, and McNish recaptured the lead on lap 108, a lead he held until the end as his competitors had to pit again in the final hour for fuel, something which both Audis did not need to because of the engine's efficiency was combined with fuel-conserving driving techniques. The sister No. 2 finished 18.579 seconds behind, giving Audi their third 1–2 finish of the season. With the completion of the 2006 season, Audi became the first manufacturer to win every single race of the LMP1 class in the American Le Mans Series.

=== 2007 ===
Several minor refinements were made to the R10; namely lighter particulate filters, a more precise suspension, an improved engine control unit from Bosch, and a refined tyre construction from supplier Michelin. The chassis and engine remained the same from the previous year's car, however, the engine's power band was improved to make the car more driveable and frugal. Two drivers, Lucas Luhr and Mike Rockenfeller, were poached from fellow German marque Porsche, the former having previously driven a Porsche RS Spyder in the American Le Mans Series and the latter having previously driven a Porsche-powered Grand-Am Daytona Prototype.

==== Le Mans ====
Audi sent three cars to the 75th 24 Hours of Le Mans. Two were run under the "Audi Sport North America" banner, and one under "Audi Sport Team Joest", with Joest Racing responsible for all three cars.

Driver lineups largely remained the same, the No. 1 R10 driven by Frank Biela, Emanuele Pirro and Marco Werner, the No. 2 by Dindo Capello, Allan McNish and Tom Kristensen, and the No. 3 by Lucas Luhr, Alexandre Prémat and Mike Rockenfeller. Kristensen was replaced by Mattias Ekström for the test days following Kristensen's severe crash at the opening round of the 2007 DTM season in April. Ekström swapped seats with Rockenfeller as Rockenfeller's stature was similar to that of Capello and McNish's. Kristensen was left to recover and following a brief test later at Brands Hatch, he was cleared to race by doctors. Kristensen's recovery meant that Ekström was not needed anymore, and he returned to Sweden.

The No. 8 Peugeot 908 HDi FAP of Sébastien Bourdais, Pedro Lamy, and Stephane Sarrazin topped the timing tables during testing, posting a 3:26.707, over a second and a half faster than the second-placed No. 2 R10 of Biela, Pirro, and Werner. This pace carried over into the first qualifying session, with Peugeot and Audi battling fiercely for pole position as rain was forecast the following day. The first session was interrupted by rain and two red flags, with Sarrazin eventually taking provisional pole away from McNish on his final flying lap, setting a 3:26.344, just over half a second ahead of McNish. The weather forecast proved to be accurate, with all of qualifying the next day taking place in wet conditions; Bourdais duly set the fastest time, a 4:01.928. Since Sarrazin's time set in dry qualifying had not been beaten, the No. 8 car was on pole for the race, with the No. 2 of Capello, McNish, and Kristen alongside them. The No. 1 and No. 2 R10 of Biela, Pirro, Werner, and Luhr, Prémat, and Rockenfeller lined up fourth and fifth, respectively.

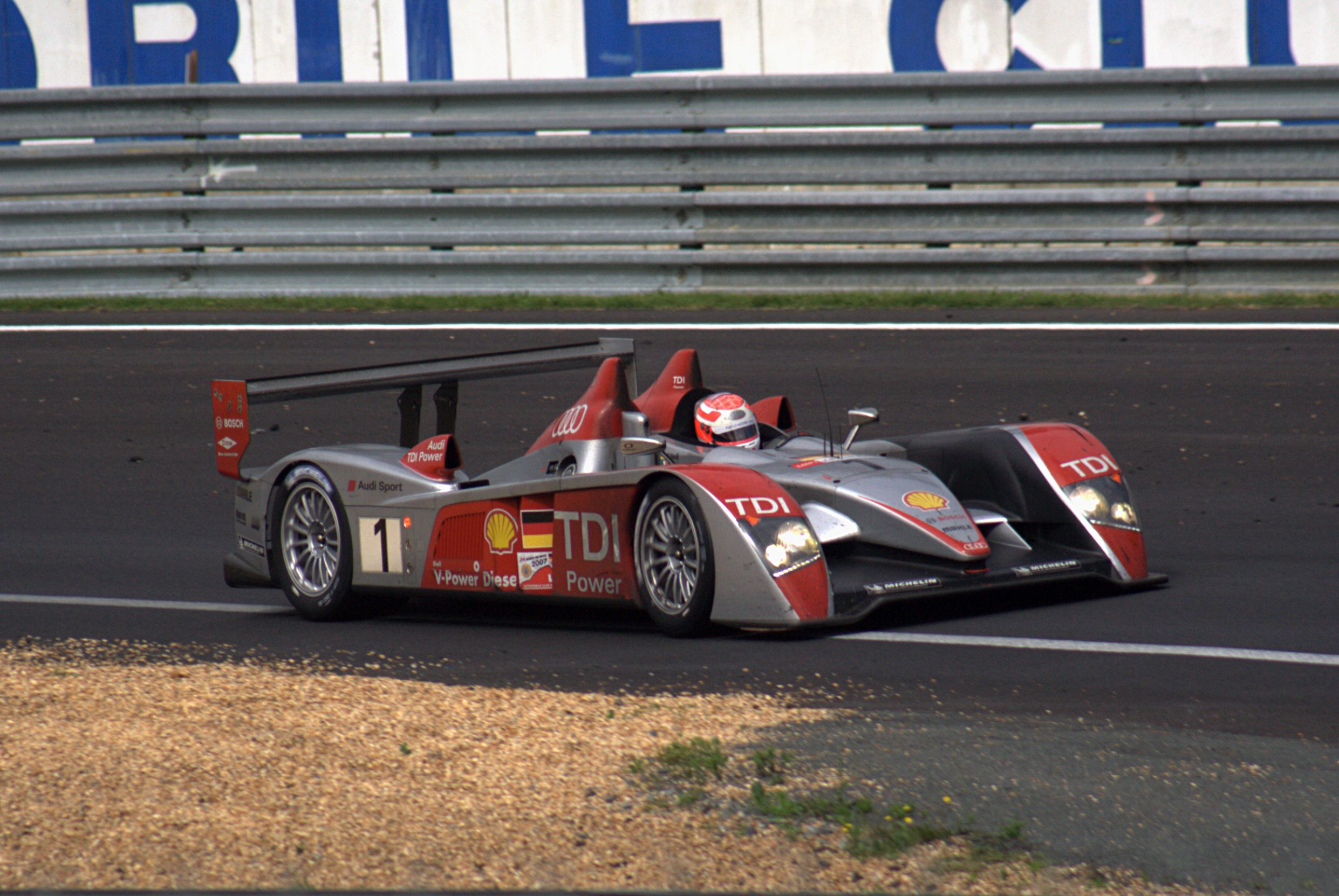
The No. 1 Audi R10 which went on to win the 2007 24 Hours of Le Mans, with Pirro at the wheel.

Bourdais led the off field in his 908 HDi but ran wide on the first lap at the Dunlop chicane and handed over the lead to Capello, and soon the Audis were running in the top three positions. Rockenfeller was one of the first victims of the still-damp track, spinning and crashing the No. 3 R10 within the first couple of hours into an Armco barrier near Tertre Rouge, destroying a significant portion of the rear assembly of his R10. Rockenfeller attempted to repair his car, but with his differential only powering a single wheel, he was eventually coerced by the marshals to retire.

Capello, along with Kristensen and McNish, steadily build up a lead after Bourdais ran wide, a lead they held despite an interruption in the seventh hour by a safety car after Werner's No. 1 R10 made contact with Jan Magnussen's Chevrolet Corvette C6.R. Capello's co-driver McNish set the fastest lap of the race in the early hours in the following morning, clocking a 3:27.176. Capello led the No. 1 R10 in his No. 2 R10 by three laps as the race passed the sixteenth hour mark, with Werner having lost time due to an unscheduled pit stop for a nose change after his contact with Magnussen. Shortly afterwards, an improperly fastened wheel nut from Capello's last pit stop worked itself loose, resulting in Capello's left rear wheel coming off, sending him into a spin and a large shunt into the barriers at the Indianapolis curve. Rod Bymaster, Audi Motorsport North America manager, remarked that "You know there's something wrong when the rear wheel passes the car". Capello was unharmed, and like Rockenfeller, attempted to restart the car before eventually retiring at 6:20 a.m. local time. Biela in the No. 1 R10 pitted shortly after, handing over the car and lead to Pirro, who extended his lead to four laps ahead of the second placed No. 7 908 HDi of Marc Gené. Pirro had a lengthy pit stop following his first stint, due to precautions ensuring that the same wheel nut failure that crippled Capello did not happen to Pirro.

Many teams forecasted that the final hours were to be raced under wet conditions, and shortly before 1:00 p.m. local time rain began to fall on track. Biela, who still led the race at the time, ran wide at the first chicane on the Mulsanne Straight, before pitting for wet weather tyres, replacing the rear bodywork and handing over the wheel to Werner. Second-placed Bourdais, who was six laps down on Biela in his No. 8 908 HDi, also came in for wet tyres. Nicolas Minassian relinquished second position shortly before the rain fell, coming into the garage with engine problems. The rain became progressively heavier, with Werner repeating the same mistake Biela made at the first chicane on the Mulsanne Straight, running straight on but not suffering any damage. Minassian's No. 7 908 HDi rejoined in fourth place, but after a single lap around the circuit he came back into the garage to finally retire with electrical problems just over an hour from the finish. The safety car came out shortly after, and Bourdais in the No. 8 908 HDi came into the garage. The safety car came in towards the end of the hour, allowing for a couple of laps under green flag conditions. The heavy rain continued, and Biela slowed down accordingly, lapping the circuit a minute and a half slower than what he had under dry conditions. Bourdais re-emerged from his garage shortly before the safety car came in, and stopped at the final chicane of the circuit on the beginning of the final lap in order to cross the finish line with the leading cars. Biela went on to take the chequered flag, and give Audi their fourth consecutive win at Le Mans, covering 5,029 km (3,125 mi) at an average speed of 209.15 km/h (129.96 mph), despite more than two hours and a half under the safety car. The R10 also set the highest top speed recorded of 351 km/h (218 mph) since the Jaguar XJR9 reached 389 km/h (242 mph) at the 1989 24 Hours of Le Mans. Pirro remarked that the team "had nine stressful hours with the Peugeot right behind us", but "the more you suffer, the greater the pleasure." Wolfgang Ullrich, head of Audi Motorsport, agreed, saying "This victory is the most difficult we have had at Le Mans", and that the team was "put under pressure by Peugeot right to the end of the race." Pirro also extended his consecutive podium finishes to nine, a record yet to be equalled.

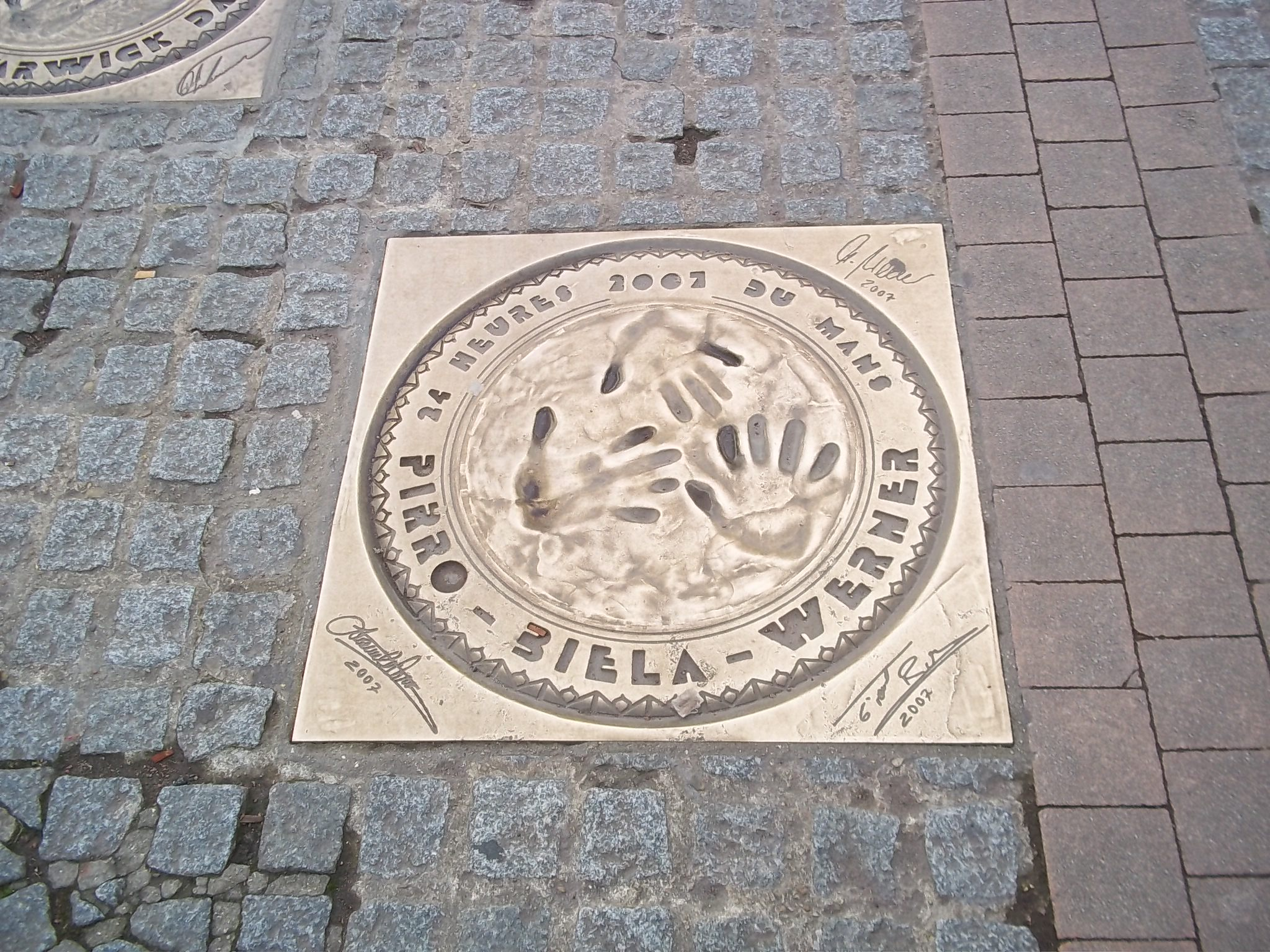
The handprints of the 2007 Le Mans-winning trio

==== American Le Mans Series ====
Audi committed to a second season of the American Le Mans Series, with Baretsky reiterating the link between Audi's motorsport developments and Audi's production cars, saying "I believe we will be able to share the things that we developed specifically for motorsport with production in the future." Again, Champion Racing handled the team's American Le Mans Series campaign, with support from Joest Racing at Sebring and Le Mans.

The replacement of Frank Biela by Marco Werner, who largely played a development role in 2006, was the only change in the driver lineup for Audi. Changes to the racing calendar included the addition of three new races, one in St. Petersburg, Florida, one in Long Beach, California, and one in Detroit, Michigan. The Portland Grand Prix was dropped from the calendar, resulting in a total of twelve races for the season. Changes to the technical regulations included a 10% reduction in size of the R10's fuel tank from 90 L (23.8 US gal) to 81 L (21.4 US gal), and the LMP2 cars received a weight reduction of 150 kg (331 lb).

The R10 proved to be still the car to beat at Sebring, continually topping the timing charts during practice. However, a mistake by Capello in the No. 1 during Thursday night practice meant that his car suffered heavy damage, returning to the pits missing almost its entire left side. Capello himself was unharmed, although the damage sustained required a full rebuild in order for it to be ready for the race.

Both R10s started on the front row for the 2007 12 Hours of Sebring, with Werner in the No. 2 setting a 1:44.974, breaking the track lap record by almost a second and edging out Capello in the No. 1. A red flag briefly interrupted qualifying, and Capello, who had just started his second flying lap, felt that it had negatively affected his qualifying in performance as he could not get his tyres up to temperature after the restart. Capello overtook Biela a couple of laps into the race, as Biela had to slow down for a slower GT2 car, and Biela also suffered from a left rear puncture shortly after the hour and a half mark, losing several positions and falling to seventh. Kristensen led until the fifth hour, when he pitted to change his car's battery. As a result of the pit stop that lasted almost fifteen minutes, Kristensen dropped down to seventh, and had to come in again just a half-hour later for another battery, starter motor, and dashboard. Kristensen pitted yet again another half-hour later for another starter motor. Kristensen, Capello, and McNish eventually finished fourth overall, second in LMP1, behind the two new LMP2 Acura ARX-01as, and the No. 2 R10 of Biela, Werner, and Pirro took the overall victory having taken and held the lead from the penultimate hour. Although the R10 set the fastest lap of the race, the No. 7 Porsche RS Spyder of Timo Bernhard, Romain Dumas, and Hélio Castroneves and the No. 26 Acura of Bryan Herta, Dario Franchitti, and Tony Kanaan frequently exchanged the lead with the R10 throughout the race, highlighting the competitiveness of the LMP2 cars following their 150 kg (331 lb) reduction in weight. Despite the strong competition, Audi's win at Sebring was the German marque's eighth in a row.

At the first street circuit of the season, the inaugural Grand Prix of St. Petersburg, the R10s faced stiff competition from the lighter, nimbler LMP2 cars, which had the edge over the R10 in the corners but fell behind on the straights. Come qualifying, both Team Penske Porsche RS Spyders were quicker than the Audis, with Romain Dumas in his No. 7 taking pole, lowering the track record with a 1:03.039, the other Penske RS Spyder lining up second, with Ryan Briscoe close behind, posting a 1:03.189. McNish was the fastest of the Audi drivers, piloting the No. 1 R10 to third on the grid with a 1:03.415, a LMP1 record. Werner was the faster of himself and Pirro in the No. 2 R10, however, could not break the 1:04 mark, posting a 1:04.139 and settling for seventh on the grid. Come race day, McNish in his No. 1 R10 attempted a risky move into turn one, hoping to catch the Porsches in front of him off-guard. He made contact with Dumas, the latter suffering from a puncture. Dumas ended up two laps down, and McNish was duly reprimanded with a stop-and-go penalty which dropped him down to eighth. Marino Franchitti led the way briefly in his Acura ARX-01a before Briscoe made contact with the Acura whilst attempting to pass Franchitti, causing Franchitti to hit the tyre wall. Franchitti and his teammate Herta could not recover from that accident; a lowly 21st was their end result. Briscoe himself was also handed with a stop-and-go penalty for the incident, although finished third overall despite yet another penalty when he forgot his goggles during a pit stop. McNish retook the lead on the nineteenth lap, and by the beginning of the 36th lap it was an entirely Audi affair. McNish took the chequered flag with Werner in the No. 2 close behind, just under half a second separated the two. A yellow flag towards the closing hour of the race was brought out for Tomas Enge, who whilst leading the LMGT2 category in his Ferrari F430 GTC shunted heavily at turn 3. This did not hinder the Audis, with both cars finishing more than twenty seconds ahead of the Porsches. McNish's fastest lap of 1:04.725 set a new LMP1 lap record, although was not quick enough for overall honours, with Briscoe slightly faster in a 1:04.340.

The next destination of the season, the 2007 Toyota Grand Prix of Long Beach was also a street circuit, nicknamed the "Monaco of the United States" due to its proximity to the coastline. Capello was the fastest of the Audi drivers, posting a 1:12.713 to qualify fourth. Pirro in the No. 2 was two places back, clocking a 1:12.911. Franchitti, who had previously raced at Long Beach during the 2002 CART season qualified on pole with a 1:11.838, the only man under 1:12. Both Audis found themselves out of contention for the own reasons; Capello encountered brake trouble in the opening laps that hindered his pace on the tight circuit. However, McNish in the No. 1 would briefly take the lead after Franchitti, who had been leading so far, lost a gamble on strategy and pitted during a full-course yellow. McNish held Franchitti up in an attempt to allow Pirro in the sister No. 2 past; Pirro promptly took the lead just over three-quarters of an hour into the race. Dumas, who had been running behind Pirro, quickly inherited the lead after Pirro collided with a Flying Lizard Motorsports 911 GT3 RSR. The accident forced Pirro to pit with a puncture, ruling him out of overall contention. McNish finished seventh after his earlier gremlins and a late pit stop cost him time. The sister R10 finished ninth, a lap behind. All the podium spots were occupied by Porsche RS Spyders, marking the first time a single marque had populated every single podium spot, as well as the first LMP2 podium lockout. With Dumas' victory, Audi's winning streak in the American Le Mans Series was finally ended, following nine consecutive overall race wins in the ALMS.

=== 2008 ===
For the 2008 season, Audi entered the Le Mans Series for the first time. Joest Racing entered two cars to compete against Peugeot's two-car entry over the five race season. Peugeot led the championships early, winning the first three races prior to the 24 Hours of Le Mans. A new sub-wing was introduced at Spa. This maintains the same level of downforce but less drag.

At Le Mans, Audi won for their third consecutive time with the R10. The No. 2 car driven by Rinaldo Capello, Allan McNish and Tom Kristensen took the chequered flag on lap 381 ahead of the No. 7 Peugeot, with a margin of just over 4 minutes. The other two Audi entries finished fourth and sixth overall. Peugeot brought their seasoned 908 HDi FAP and qualified within the 3:18 range while Audi struggled to get under the 3:23 mark. In the race itself the Peugeot was still up to 3.5 seconds a lap faster but quick pit work by Audi and the superior performance by the R10 in the rain saw Audi winning Le Mans.

Returning to the Le Mans Series for the final two races of the year, Peugeot won once again at the Nürburgring and maintaining their lead in the championships. However, accidents for Peugeot and a win by the No. 1 Audi of Rinaldo Capello and Allan McNish at the Silverstone finale allowed the Audi team to win the Constructors Championship, while the No. 2 Audi of Mike Rockenfeller and Alexandre Prémat earned the Drivers and Teams Championships.

Audi also continued their participation in the American Le Mans Series. As in the year before, Audi fought against the Penske Racing Porsches for overall race wins, but unlike before they now had to contend with the multiple Acura teams. Porsche managed to end Audi's streak of seven straight victories at the 12 Hours of Sebring, but Audi rebounded with overall wins in the next two events. Three more overall victories were earned by Audi by time the series reached the Detroit Sports Car Challenge. Audi not only failed to win the race overall, but following a rule infraction, neither car finished in the LMP1 category. This was the first time that the Audi R10 failed to win in LMP1, and the first LMP1 loss by Audi since 2005. At Petit Le Mans, Allan McNish overtook Christian Klien in the Peugeot on the penultimate lap and held on to the win.

=== 2009 ===
In the 2009 season, the R10 TDI was replaced by the R15 TDI with a smaller, lighter, more-efficient TDI engine; however, Audi concentrated on the 24 Hours of Le Mans and Deutsche Tourenwagen Masters (DTM; German Touring Car Masters) efforts. The new car, however, ran in the 2009 12 Hours of Sebring before preparing for Le Mans. The Audi R10's wing was limited by the 2009 regulations. In early 2009, Colin Kolles announced that his team will run privately entered Audi R10 TDI's in that year's 24 Hours of Le Mans, and possibly the Le Mans Series. The deal included factory assistance for servicing the cars. At Le Mans, the Audi R10 best finished 7th overall, a few laps down on the highest petrol finisher Lola-Aston Martin which ranked 4th overall.

=== 2010 ===
Kolles fielded 2 Audi R10 in their final year at the Le Mans 24 Hours, on 14 June 2010. Unlike the factory Audi and Peugeot LMP1, the Kolles R10 was not hampered by the new restrictor regulations which should have shaved off 60 bhp from the diesel-powered prototypes. The cars qualified 3:30, just behind the two Lola Astons. Both cars failed to finish because too much strain from torque was put onto the gearbox.

== Legacy ==
The 380 laps completed by the R10 was a new record in the number of laps completed, however, it did not surpass the distance record set by Helmut Marko and Gijs van Lennep in the 1971 24 Hours of Le Mans; that was broken by the R10's successor, the R15. Along with the R8, the R10 remains one of Audi's most successful Le Mans prototypes, entering 48 races and winning 36.

The R10 also won the 2006 Autosport Pioneering and Innovation Award, with Jean Alesi and Eddie Jordan presenting the award to Wolfgang Ullrich.

Ultimately, changes that the Automobile Club de l'Ouest (the organisation responsible for the 24 Hours of Le Mans) made to the regulations meant that Audi's successful open-cockpit lineage came to a close prior to the start of the 2011 season. Ullrich, despite his professed love for open-cockpit prototypes, explained how "the driver change [easier in an open car] is no longer the dominant factor in the time of the pit stop", and "It is getting more and more important to have maximum aerodynamic efficiency". The capacity of turbodiesel engines was reduced from 5.5 L (335.6 cu in) to 3.7 L (225.8 cu in), as such, they produced less power, and aerodynamic efficiency played a bigger part in determining how quick a car was. Turbodiesel prototypes also received a further reduction in fuel tank capacity, from 81 L (21.4 US gal) to 63 L (16.6 US gal).

Motor Sport magazine featured the 2008 Le Mans-winning trio of Capello, McNish, and Kristensen in a 2014 special, Great Racing Cars. McNish recalled that "you really had to throw the R10 around", and "You had to attack, every single lap of the race, and the bizarre phenomenon was that you could race the car at the same speed as you did in qualifying." Capello also reminisced about the visual design of the R10, saying that the R10's front fascia was "the most beautiful front end we had in the last 10 years at Audi Sport."

== Racing results ==
=== Complete American Le Mans Series results ===
(key) Races in bold indicates pole position. Races in italics indicates fastest lap.

Complete American Le Mans Series results
Year	Entrant	Class	Drivers	No.	Rds.	Rounds												Pts.	Pos.
Year	Entrant	Class	Drivers	No.	Rds.	1	2	3	4	5	6	7	8	9	10	11	12	Pts.	Pos.
2006	(United States) Audi Sport North America	LMP1	(Italy) Rinaldo Capello (United Kingdom) Allan McNish (Denmark) Tom Kristensen	2	1, 5–10; 1, 5–10; 1	**SEB**; 1				UTA; 4	PIR; 1	**ELK**; 2	MOS; 1	ATL; 1	LGA; 1			215*	1st
2006	(United States) Audi Sport North America	LMP1	(Germany) Frank Biela (Italy) Emanuele Pirro (Germany) Marco Werner	1	1, 5–10; 1, 5–10; 1, 9	SEB; Ret				**UTA**; 1	PIR; 2	ELK; 1	MOS; 4	ATL; 5	LGA; 2			215*	1st
2007	(United States) Audi Sport North America	LMP1	(Italy) Rinaldo Capello (United Kingdom) Allan McNish (Denmark) Tom Kristensen	1	All; All; 1	SEB; 2	STP; 1	LBH; 1	HOU; 1	UTA; 1	LIM; 1	MDO; 2	ELK; 1	**MOS**; 1	DET; 2	ATL; 1	LGA; 1	258	1st
2007	(United States) Audi Sport North America	LMP1	(Germany) Marco Werner (Italy) Emanuele Pirro (Germany) Frank Biela (Germany) Lucas Luhr (Germany) Mike Rockenfeller	2	All; 1–10; 1; 11; 12	**SEB**; 1	STP; 2	LBH; 2	HOU; 2	UTA; 2	LIM; 4	MDO; 1	ELK; 2	MOS; 2	DET; 1	**ATL**; 4	LGA; 2	258	1st
2008	(United States) Audi Sport North America	LMP1	(Italy) Rinaldo Capello (United Kingdom) Allan McNish (Denmark) Tom Kristensen (Italy) Emanuele Pirro (Germany) Frank Biela (Switzerland) Marcel Fässler (Netherlands) Christijan Albers	1	1, 5–6, 8, 10; 1, 10; 1; 2–11; 2–4; 7, 9; 11	**SEB**; 1	STP; Ret	LBH; 2	UTA; 3**	LIM; 3	MDO; 2	**ELK**; 2	MOS; 2	DET; DSQ	ATL; 1	LGA; 2		230	1st
2008	(United States) Audi Sport North America	LMP1	(Germany) Marco Werner (Germany) Lucas Luhr (Germany) Mike Rockenfeller	2	All; All; 1	SEB; 2	**STP**; 1	LBH; 1	UTA; 1	LIM; 1	MDO; 1	ELK; 1	**MOS**; 1	DET; Ret	ATL; 3	LGA; 1		230	1st

*60 points were scored with the R8 LMP.
**Despite retiring 17 laps behind the leader, they had completed over 70% of the winner's distance and were thus classified.

=== Complete European Le Mans Series results ===
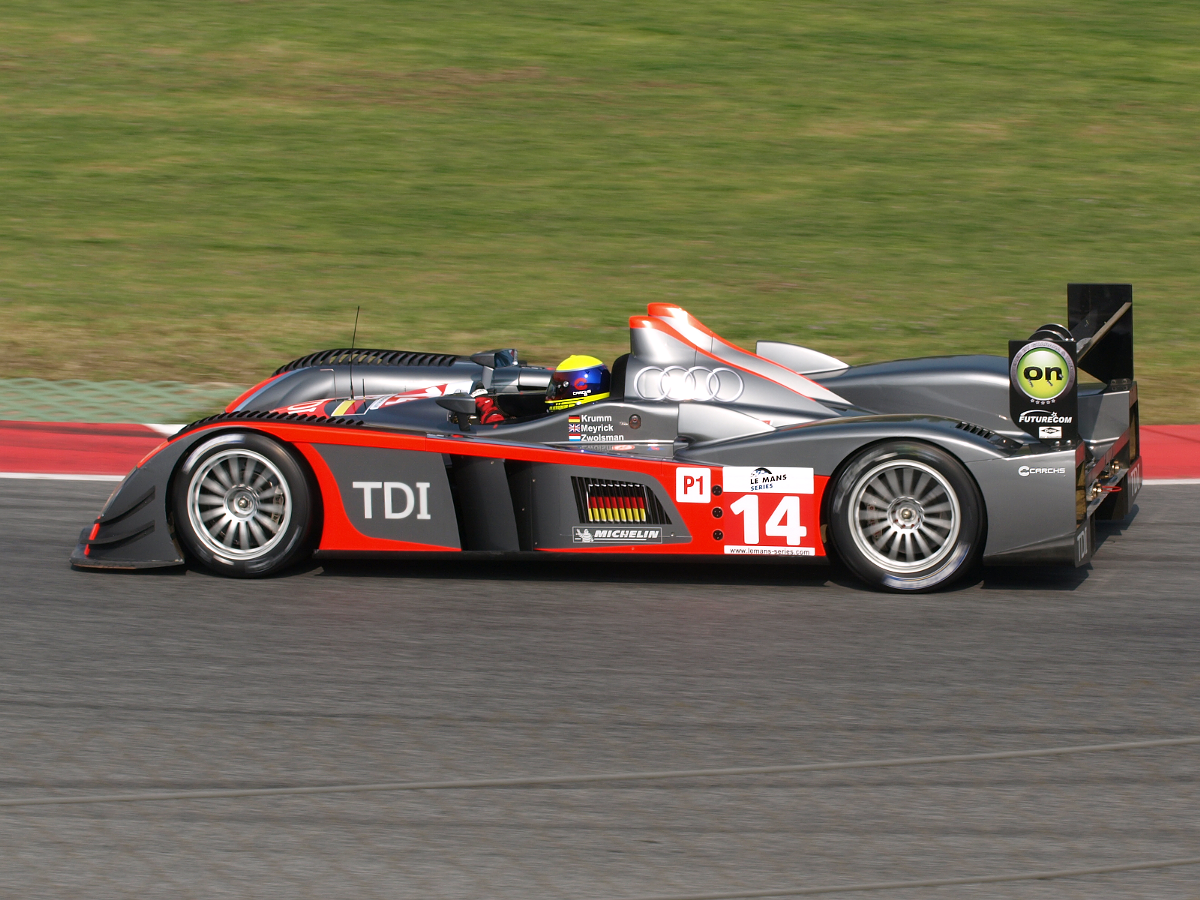
The No. 14 Kolles' R10 TDI competing at the 2009 1000 km of Catalunya

(key) Races in bold indicates pole position. Races in italics indicates fastest lap.

Complete European Le Mans Series results
Year	Entrant	Class	Drivers	No.	Rds.	Rounds					Pts.	Pos.
Year	Entrant	Class	Drivers	No.	Rds.	1	2	3	4	5	Pts.	Pos.
2008	(Germany) Audi Team Joest	LMP1	(Italy) Rinaldo Capello (United Kingdom) Allan McNish	1	All; All	CAT; 5	MON; 6	SPA; 4	NUR; 4	SIL; 1	27	3rd
2008	(Germany) Audi Team Joest	LMP1	(France) Alexandre Prémat (Germany) Mike Rockenfeller	2	All; All	CAT; 2	MON; 2	SPA; 2	NUR; 3	SIL; 4	35	1st
2009	(Germany) Kolles	LMP1	(Netherlands) Charles Zwolsman Jr. (United Kingdom) Andy Meyrick (India) Narain Karthikeyan (Germany) Michael Krumm	14	All; All; 1; 2–5	CAT; 8	SPA; 6	ALG; NC	NUR; 4	SIL; 6	12	7th
2009	(Germany) Kolles	LMP1	(Denmark) Christian Bakkerud (Netherlands) Christijan Albers (Switzerland) Giorgio Mondini	15	All; All; 2–4	CAT; Ret	SPA; 7	ALG; Ret	NUR; Ret	SIL; 5	6	10th

=== Complete 24 Hours of Le Mans results ===
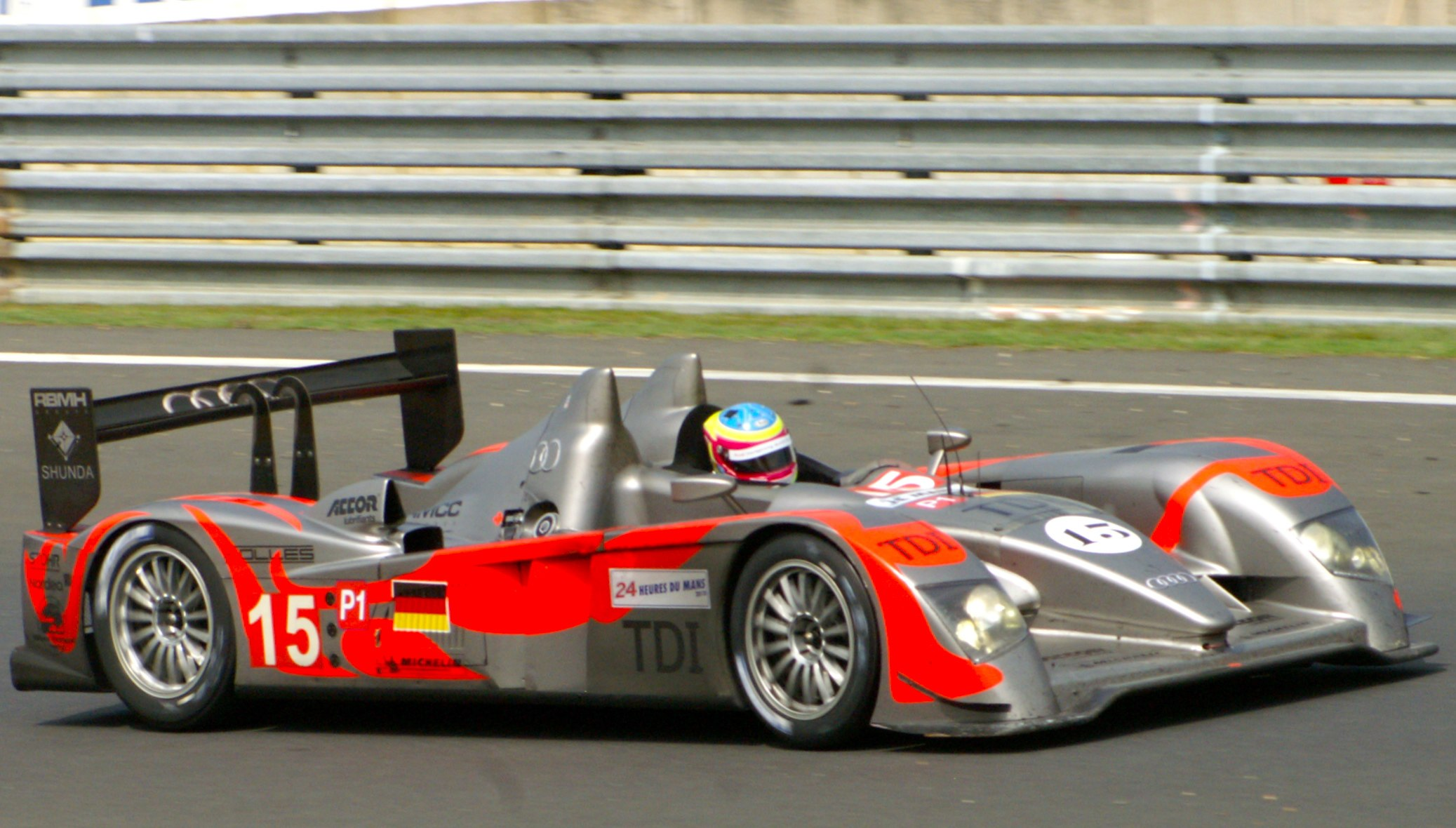
The No. 15 Kolles at the 2010 24 Hours of Le Mans.

(key) Races in bold indicates pole position. Races in italics indicates fastest lap.

Complete 24 Hours of Le Mans results
Year	Team	Class	No.	Drivers	Position
2006	(Germany) Audi Sport Team Joest	LMP1	8	(Germany) Frank Biela (Germany) Marco Werner (Italy) Emanuele Pirro	1st
2006	(Germany) Audi Sport Team Joest	LMP1	7	(Italy) Rinaldo Capello (United Kingdom) Allan McNish (Denmark) Tom Kristensen	**3rd**
2007	(Germany) Audi Sport Team Joest	LMP1	3	(Germany) Lucas Luhr (Germany) Mike Rockenfeller (France) Alexandre Prémat	Ret
2007	(Germany) Audi Sport North America	LMP1	2	(Italy) Rinaldo Capello (United Kingdom) Allan McNish (Denmark) Tom Kristensen	Ret
2007	(Germany) Audi Sport North America	LMP1	1	(Germany) Frank Biela (Germany) Marco Werner (Italy) Emanuele Pirro	1st
2008	(Germany) Audi Sport Team Joest	LMP1	3	(Germany) Lucas Luhr (Germany) Mike Rockenfeller (France) Alexandre Prémat	4th
2008	(Germany) Audi Sport North America	LMP1	2	(Italy) Rinaldo Capello (United Kingdom) Allan McNish (Denmark) Tom Kristensen	1st
2008	(Germany) Audi Sport North America	LMP1	1	(Germany) Frank Biela (Germany) Marco Werner (Italy) Emanuele Pirro	6th
2009	(Germany) Kolles	LMP1	14	(Netherlands) Charles Zwolsman Jr. (India) Narain Karthikeyan (Germany) André Lotterer	7th
2009	(Germany) Kolles	LMP1	15	(Denmark) Christian Bakkerud (Netherlands) Christijan Albers (Switzerland) Giorgio Mondini	9th
2010	(Germany) Kolles	LMP1	14	(United States) Scott Tucker (Portugal) Manuel Rodrigues (France) Christophe Bouchut	Ret
2010	(Germany) Kolles	LMP1	15	(Denmark) Christian Bakkerud (Netherlands) Christijan Albers (United Kingdom) Oliver Jarvis	Ret

== See also ==
- Peugeot 908 HDi FAP
- Diesel automobile racing

Awards
Preceded by GP2 Series	Autosport; Pioneering and Innovation Award; 2006	Succeeded by HANS device
