= Panoz Esperante =

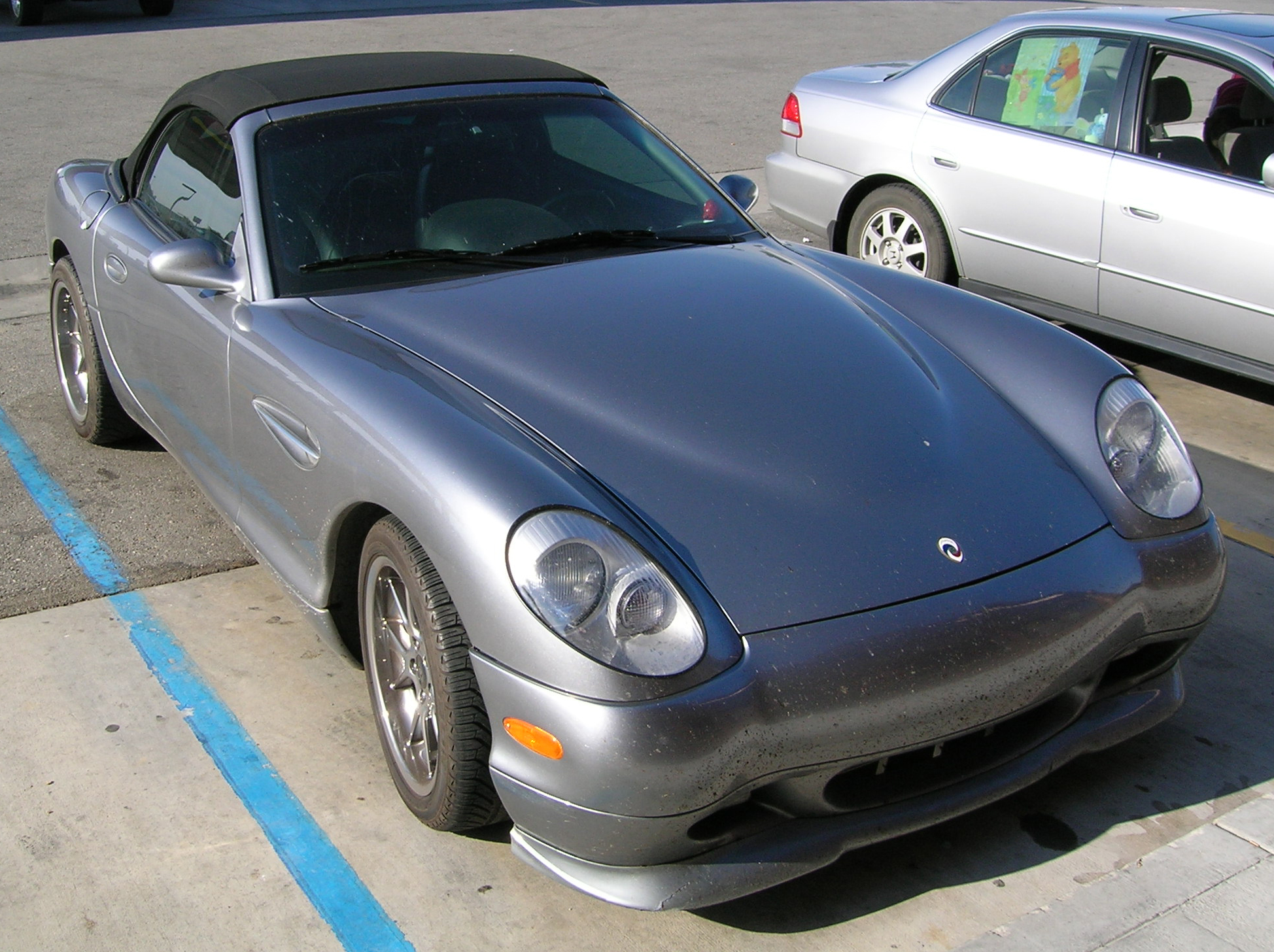

Overview
- Manufacturer: Panoz, LLC
- Production: 2000–2007 (1st Gen); 2014–2015 (2nd Gen)
- Assembly: Braselton, Georgia 30548, U.S.

Body and chassis
- Layout: FR layout

Chronology
- Successor: Panoz Avezzano (for coupe model)

The Panoz Esperante is a sports car manufactured by Panoz, a Georgia-based car manufacturer. Despite sharing the name with the Panoz Esperante GTR-1, they were unrelated.

== First generation ==
First generation
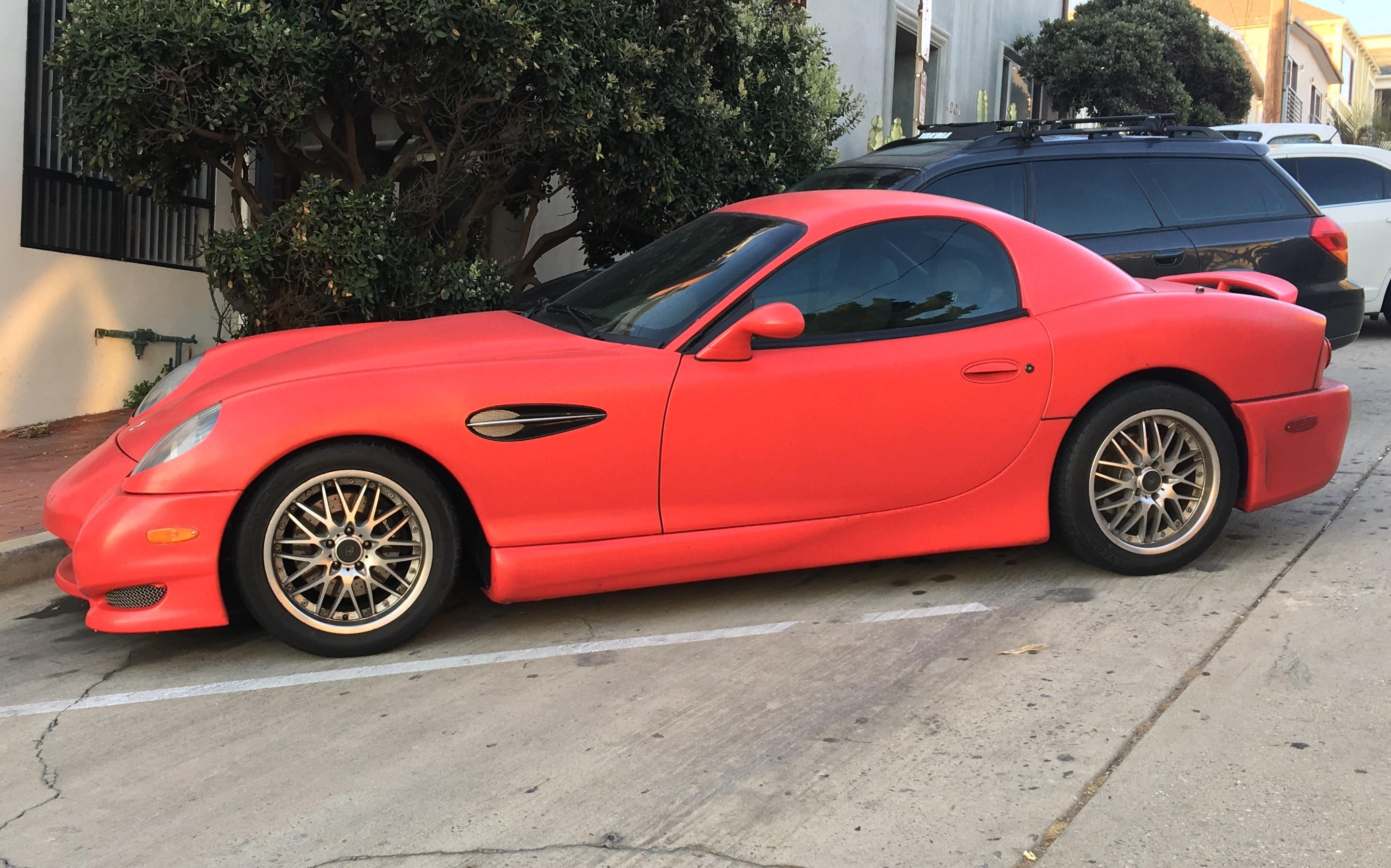
- Panoz Esperante GTLM

Overview
- Production: 2000–2007
- Assembly: Braselton, Georgia, 30548, United States

Body and chassis
- Body style: 2-door coupé (Esperante GTLM); 2-door convertible
- Layout: FR layout

Powertrain
- Engine: 4.6 L (281 CID) Modular V8; 4.6 L supercharged Modular V8
- Transmission: 4-speed automatic, 5-speed manual, 6-speed manual

Dimensions
- Wheelbase: 106 in (2,700 mm)
- Length: 185.9 in (4,720 mm)
- Width: 73.7 in (1,870 mm)
- Height: 53.2 in (1,350 mm)
- Curb weight: 3,384 lb (1,535 kg)

First shown at the 2000 New York Motor Show, the Esperante followed up on the company's first model, the minimal Roadster. The company designed the Esperante to be easy to manufacture, with the chassis designed in five modules making extensive use of extruded aluminum. There was no welding involved; pieces were bonded and bolted together instead. Panoz also took advantage of the numerous aviation craftsmen located in and around Atlanta, for design and manufacture as well. The engines for the first generation were sourced from Ford Motor Company's Modular V8 family.

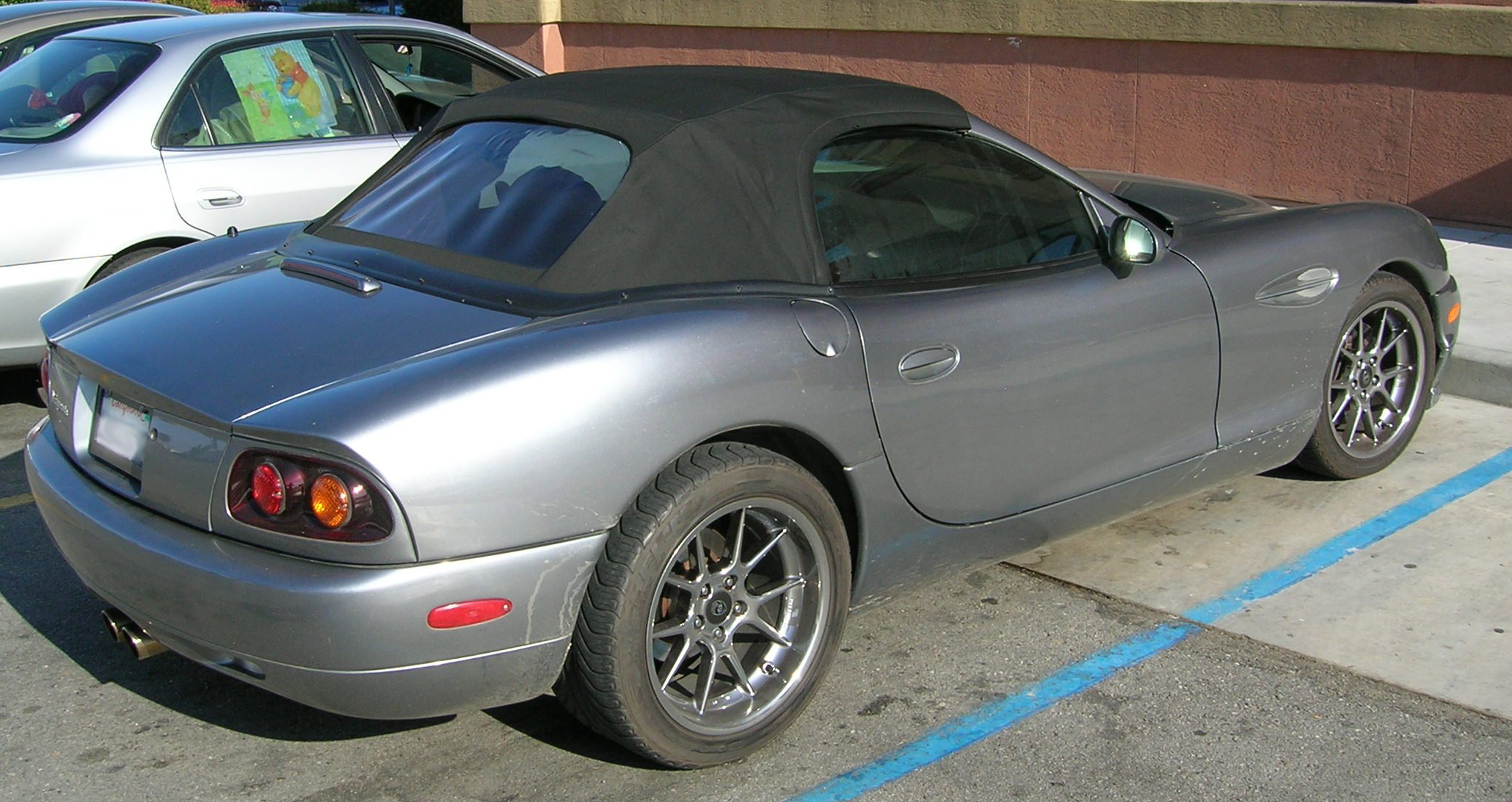
Panoz Esperante rear

There have been several versions of the original Esperante: the original base model (later given the GT moniker), the GTLM coupe, the GTS, the JRD (an aftermarket upgrade brand similar to Roush Mustangs), and the Brabham. Each model has different specifications. The GTLM, for example, uses a supercharger to boost power from 305 hp (227 kW) to 420 hp (313 kW), raising performance from 0–60 mph in 5 seconds to 4 seconds. The GTS on the other hand is built as a driver's class spec car, to SCCA standards, with harness, roll cage, side bars, etc. Additionally, it is around 600 lb (272 kg) lighter than the base Esperante, has a steel 5.8 liter V8 racing engine that produces 385 bhp (287 kW; 390 PS), and is made of easily replaceable panels to facilitate small impact race repair. It can do 0–60 mph (97 km/h) in 4.2 seconds, go up to a top speed of 182 mph (293 km/h), and achieve 0.98 g of lateral grip.

== Specifications ==
=== Body and chassis ===
- Layout: Front/mid-engine, rear wheel drive, luxury sport convertible
- Body: Hand assembled lightweight SPF aluminum.
- Chassis: Hand built modular extruded aluminum, bolted and bonded to steel subframes

=== Engine and drivetrain ===
- Engine: Ford Modular, hand assembled DOHC, 32-valve, 90-degree, aluminum V8
- Displacement: 4,601 cc
- Power: 305 hp (227 kW) at 5,800 rpm
- Torque: 320 lb⋅ft (434 N⋅m) at 4,200 rpm
- Compression ratio: 9.8:1
- Bore by stroke: 3.55 by 3.54 in (90.2 by 90.0 mm)
- Fuel: Gasoline 93 octane
- Fuel injection: Sequential electronic indirect multi-point
- Ignition: Distributorless, coil-on-plug
- Transmission: Tremec T45 5-speed manual; 4-speed automatic (optional)
- Gear ratios: 1st: 3.37:1 2nd: 1.99:1 3rd: 1.33:1 4th: 1.00:1 5th: 0.67:1

Rev: 3.22:1 final: 3.27:1

- Differential: Limited-slip type, 8.8 inch (224 mm) ring gear, aluminum case
- Weight: 1,200 kg (2,646 lb)

=== Performance ===
- 0–62 mph (0–100 km/h): 4.2 seconds (Esperante GTLM)
- 0–62 mph (0–100 km/h): 4.9 seconds (Esperante GT)
- 0–62 mph (0–100 km/h): 5.1 seconds (Esperante)
- Quarter mile: 13.4 seconds at 107.3 mph (Esperante GT)
- Quarter mile: 13.7 seconds at 103.5 mph (Esperante)
- Lateral acceleration: 0.96 g (Esperante GT)
- Lateral acceleration: 0.92 g (Esperante)
- Top speed: 155 mph (250 km/h) with manual transmission
- Top speed: 150 mph (242 km/h) with automatic transmission

=== Suspension ===
- Front: Fully independent short long arm (SLA) double wishbone configuration with gas charged Eibach coil-over shock absorbers and anti-roll bar
- Rear: Fully independent, double wishbone with horizontally opposed, pushrod-and-rocker activated Penske gas charged coil-over shock absorbers and anti-roll bar.
- Wheels: Aluminum BBS, 17 by 9 inches (430 by 230 mm)
- Installed tires: Yokohama, Dunlop P255/45ZR17

=== Brakes ===
- Manufacturer: Performance Friction Brakes
- Type: Four-wheel power assisted ventilated discs
- ABS: Electronic three channel, four sensor
- Front: Dual-piston caliper with high-pressure steel braided brake lines and 13 inch (330 mm) vented steel rotor
- Rear: Single-piston caliper with 11.7 inch (297 mm) vented steel rotor

=== Steering ===
- Type: Power assisted rack and pinion
- Turns lock-to-lock: 2.5
- Ratio: 15:1

=== Dimensions and capacities ===
- Seating capacity: 2
- Wheelbase: 106.0 in (2.713 m)
- Track: front 60.9 in (1.55 m), rear 63.2 in (1.58 m)
- Overall length: 176.3 in (4.478 m)
- Overall width: 73.2 in (1.859 m)
- Overall height: 53.4 in (1.356 m)
- Ride height: 5.0 in (127 mm)
- Curb weight: 3200 lb (1,450 kg)
- Fuel capacity: 15.7 U.S. gal (59.4 L)

=== Other technical specifications ===
- AM/FM/ audio system with subwoofers and dual speakers
- Air conditioning
- Power windows
- Cruise control
- Traction control
- Stability control
- Power folding convertible top for the convertible model

== Second generation ==
Second generation (Esperante Spyder GT)

Overview
- Also called: Panoz Avezzano
- Production: 2014–2015
- Assembly: Hoschton, Georgia 30548, United States

Body and chassis
- Body style: 2-door convertible
- Layout: FR layout

Powertrain
- Engine: 5.0 L Coyote NA V8; 6.2 L LT1 NA V8; 6.2 L LSA supercharged V8; 6.2 L LT4 supercharged V8
- Transmission: 6-speed manual 6-speed automatic

Dimensions
- Wheelbase: 106 in (2,700 mm)
- Length: 182 in (4,600 mm)
- Width: 76.5 in (1,940 mm)
- Height: 47.9 in (1,220 mm)
- Curb weight: 3,384 lb (1,535 kg)

Introduced in 2014, the 2015 430-hp Spyder and 560-hp Spyder GT were only in production for about a year. As well as the Ford Modular V8, the second generation was equipped with more powerful General Motors LS engines, with available supercharging.

== Racing (Panoz Esperante GTLM) ==
Panoz Esperante GTLM
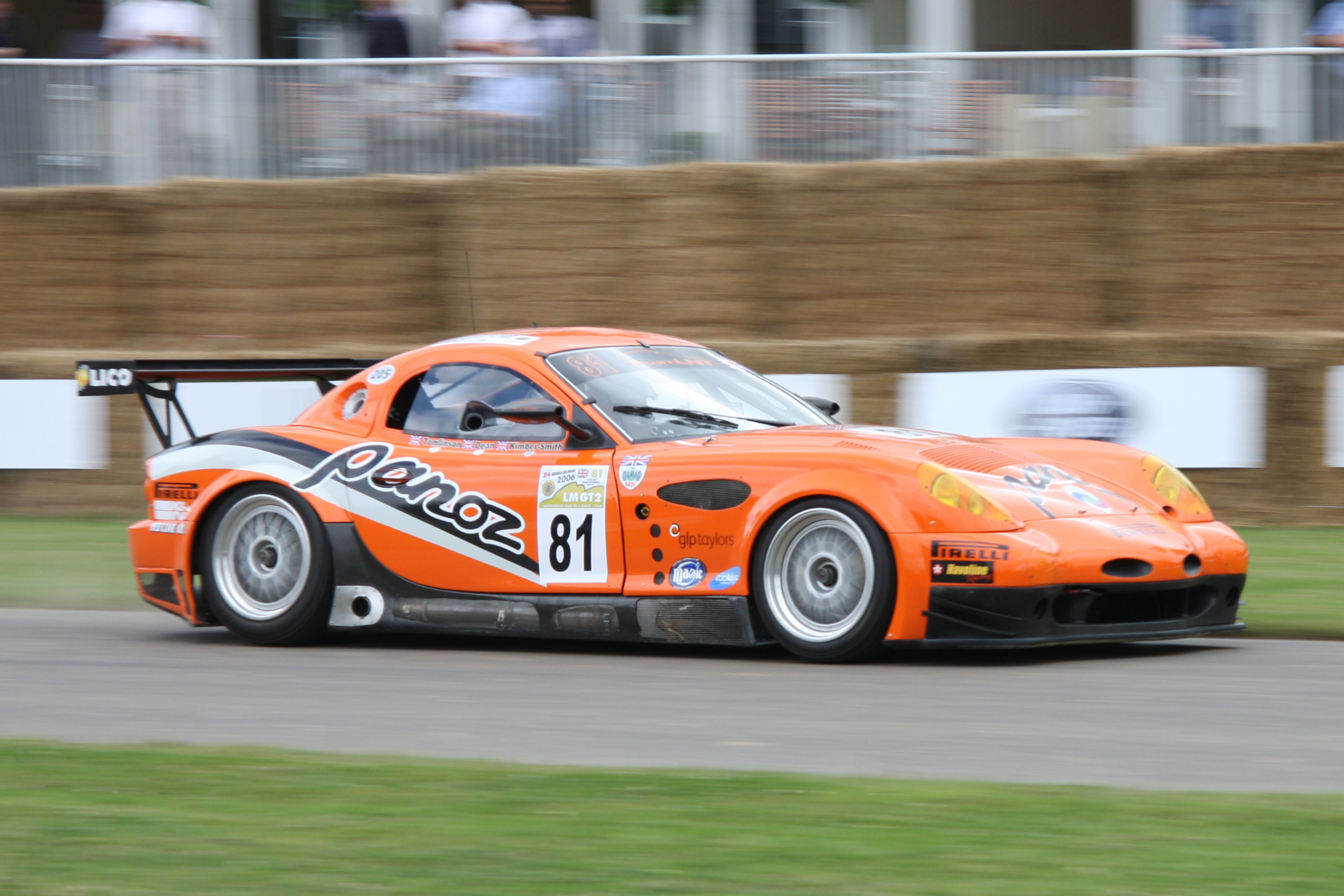
- Category: American Le Mans Series GT2; 24 Hours of Le Mans GT2
- Constructor: (United States) Panoz
- Designers: Don Panoz; Tom Milner Sr. Simon Marshall; Nick Alcock

Technical specifications
- Chassis: Modular extruded aluminium peripheral frame forming the basis for a semi monocoque central structure, unibody space frame, bolted and bonded to optimized tubular front and rear steel subframes
- Suspension (front): Double A-arm with coil springs, adjustable anti-roll bar
- Suspension (rear): As front
- Length: 4,722 mm (186 in)
- Width: 1,872 mm (74 in) excluding side rear view mirror 1,973 mm (78 in) including side rear view mirror
- Height: 1351–1356 mm (53.2–53.4 in) depending on use of ride height (medium ride height: 1,353.5 mm (53.3 in))
- Axle track: Front: 1552–1608 mm (61.1–63.3 in); Rear: 1542–1626 mm (60.7–64 in)
- Wheelbase: 2,692 mm (106 in)
- Engine: Ford-Élan Modular M-6007-T50EA 5.0 L (305 cu in) V8 90° cylinder angle, 32-valve, DOHC, four valves per cylinder, naturally aspirated (no Turbocharger), front engined, longitudinally mounted
- Transmission: Hewland IGTC 6-speed sequential manual gearbox, Xtrac Salisbury adjustable mechanical limited-slip differential
- Power: 476 hp (355 kW) @ 5500 rpm, over 476 ft⋅lbf (645 N⋅m) @ 5500 rpm torque
- Weight: 1,200 kg (2,646 lb) (including driver)
- Fuel: Ethanol E10, 90% gasoline
- Lubricants: Moty's
- Tyres: Yokohama ADVAN; Dunlop; Front: 320/65 - R18; Rear: 330/71 - R18; BBS aluminum wheels Front: 12.5 x 18 inches Rear: 13 x 18 inches

Competition history
- Notable entrants: (Canada) Multimatic Motorsports (United States) Panoz Team PTG (United States) Robertson Racing
- Notable drivers: (Canada) Scott Maxwell (Australia) David Brabham (United States) Gunnar Jeannette (United States) Tommy Milner (France) Sébastien Bourdais (United States) Bill Auberlen (United States) Joey Hand (United Kingdom) Tom Kimber-Smith (United States) Ross Smith (United States) David Robertson (United States) Andrea Robertson (United States) David Murry (Netherlands) Arie Luyendyk Jr. (United States) Bryan Sellers (United States) Tom Sutherland (Germany) Dominik Farnbacher (United Kingdom) Ian James
- Debut: 2006 12 Hours of Sebring
Races	Wins	Poles	F/Laps
43	0	0	0
- Constructors' Championships: 0
- Drivers' Championships: 0

A racing version of the Esperante known as the Esperante GT-LM was developed by Panoz for the GT2 category of the 24 Hours of Le Mans. 2006 was a year of noticeable achievement for Panoz.

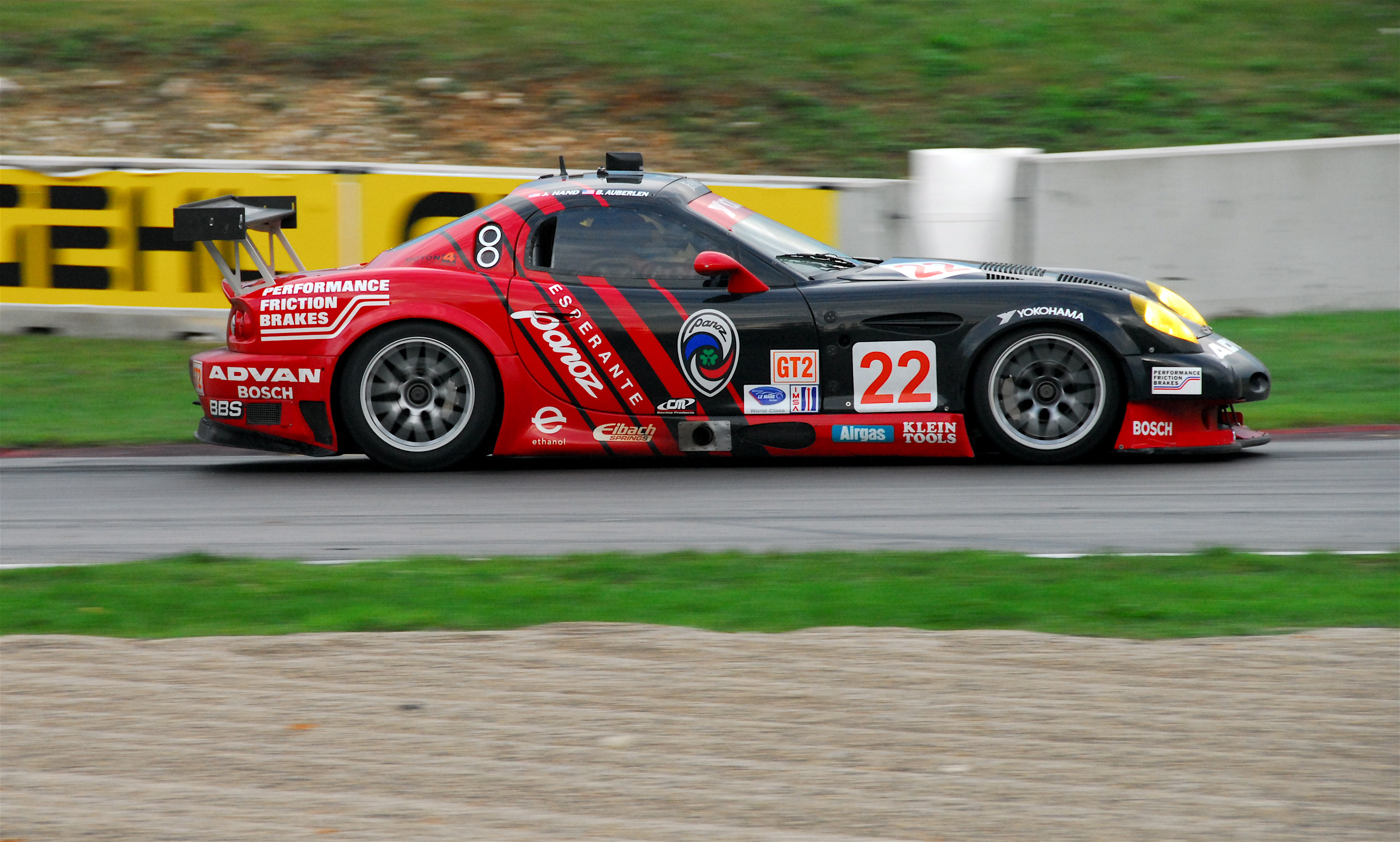
PTG's Panoz Esperante GT-LM at the 2007 Generac 500

The #50 Multimatic Motorsports Team Panoz Esperante GT-LM took a first place podium finish at the 55th Annual Mobil 1 Twelve Hours of Sebring beating GT2 regulars BMW, Porsche, Ferrari, and Spyker.

That June the #81 Panoz Esperante GT-LM campaigned by England-based Team LNT managed to outlast and overtake the remaining LMGT2 contenders in the final hour of the 2006 24 Hours of Le Mans.

In Europe, Team LNT will be campaigning two Esperantes also. They will be competing in the British GT Championship and Le Mans Endurance Series. Team LNT will be returning to the 24 Hours of Le Mans in 2007 with both the #81 and #82 cars.

During the 2007 American Le Mans season the Panoz Esperante GTLM will be managed, stateside, by Tom Milner and Team PTG. They will be campaigning two GT-LMs (#20 and #21). Team PTG scored 1 GT2 class podium in the hands of Bill Auberlen and Joey Hand in 2007 Sports Car Challenge of St. Petersburg. In the same year, Panoz Esperante GTLM also fielded Robertson Racing Team as 2007 ALMS season part-time entries in the hands of Andrea Robertson, David Robertson and Arie Luyendyk Jr.
