= 2006 12 Hours of Sebring =

1st race of the 2006 American Le Mans Series

Track map of the Sebring International Raceway

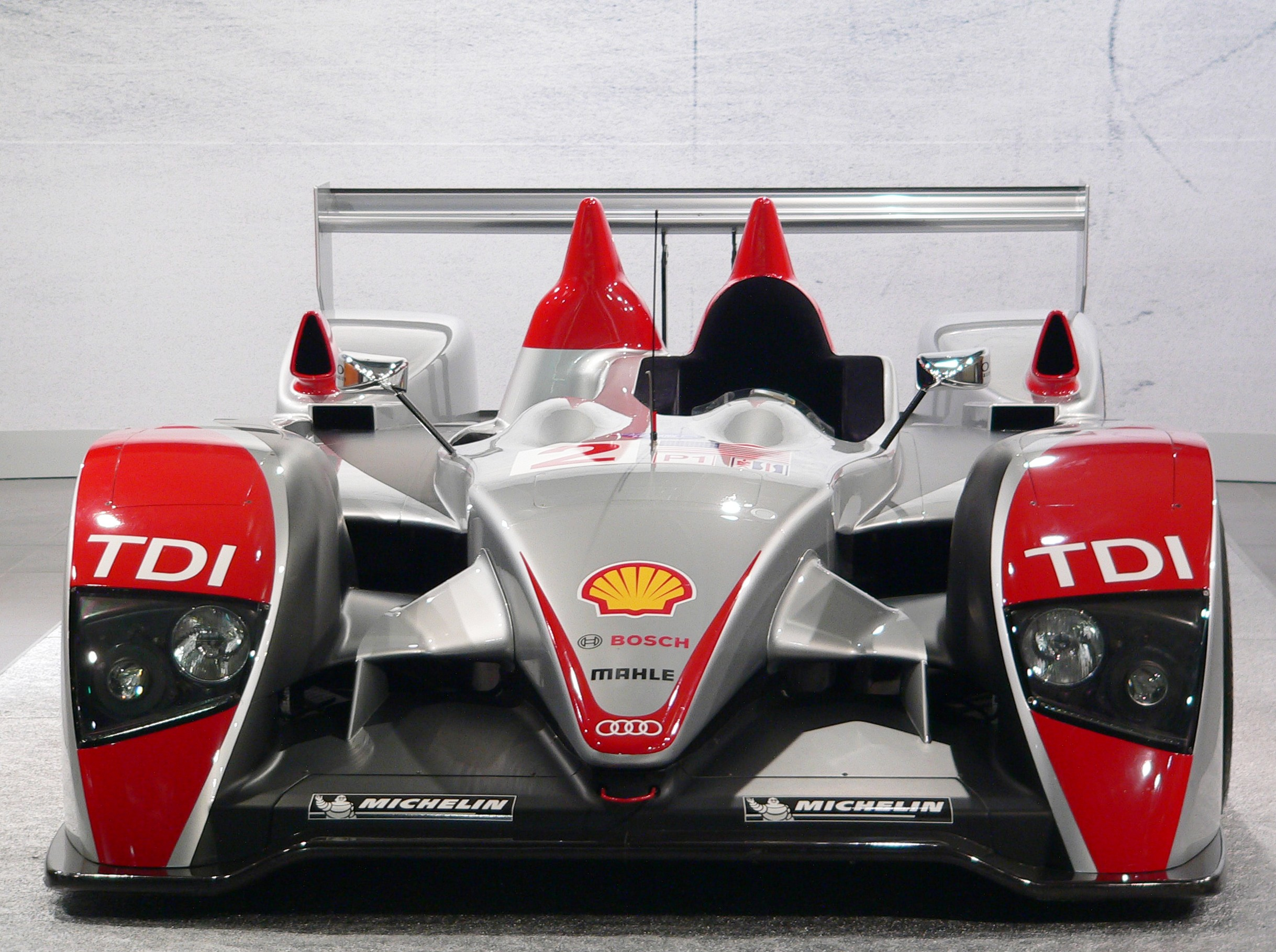
Audi R10 TDI

The 2006 12 Hours of Sebring was the 54th running of this event, and took place on March 18, 2006. The race was sponsored by Mobil 1 and was the opening race of the 2006 American Le Mans Series season run by IMSA.

This race marked the first time that a diesel powered racing vehicle had won a major endurance sports car race, with Audi taking the victory in their new R10 TDI sports car, which was also the car's first race ever. However the win was not without problems, as one of the two Audi R10s suffered overheating problems and did not finish. This victory would be a building block towards the diesel R10 winning the marquis ACO event the 2006 24 Hours of Le Mans and taking 36 class wins in 48 career races entered.

Liz Halliday's second place overall is the best for any woman in the history of the 12 Hours of Sebring as of December 2012.

== Official results ==
Class winners in bold. Cars failing to complete 70% of winner's distance marked as Not Classified (NC).

Pos	Class	No	Team	Drivers	Chassis	Tyre	Laps
Pos	Class	No	Team	Drivers	Engine	Tyre	Laps
1	**LMP1**	**2**	**(United States) Audi Sport North America**	**(Italy) Rinaldo Capello (United Kingdom) Allan McNish (Denmark) Tom Kristensen**	**Audi R10 TDI**	MI	**349**
1	**LMP1**	**2**	**(United States) Audi Sport North America**	**(Italy) Rinaldo Capello (United Kingdom) Allan McNish (Denmark) Tom Kristensen**	**Audi TDI 5.5L Turbo V12 (Diesel)**	MI	**349**
2	**LMP2**	**37**	**(United States) Intersport Racing**	**(United States) Jon Field (United States) Clint Field (United States) Liz Halliday**	**Lola B05/40**	G	**345**
2	**LMP2**	**37**	**(United States) Intersport Racing**	**(United States) Jon Field (United States) Clint Field (United States) Liz Halliday**	**AER P07 2.0L Turbo I4**	G	**345**
3	**GT1**	**4**	**(United States) Corvette Racing**	**(United Kingdom) Oliver Gavin (Monaco) Olivier Beretta (Denmark) Jan Magnussen**	**Chevrolet Corvette C6.R**	MI	**338**
3	**GT1**	**4**	**(United States) Corvette Racing**	**(United Kingdom) Oliver Gavin (Monaco) Olivier Beretta (Denmark) Jan Magnussen**	**Chevrolet LS7r 7.0L V8**	MI	**338**
4	GT1	009	(United Kingdom) Aston Martin Racing	(France) Stéphane Sarrazin (Portugal) Pedro Lamy (Australia) Jason Bright	Aston Martin DBR9	P	337
4	GT1	009	(United Kingdom) Aston Martin Racing	(France) Stéphane Sarrazin (Portugal) Pedro Lamy (Australia) Jason Bright	Aston Martin 6.0L V12	P	337
5	LMP1	16	(United States) Dyson Racing	(United Kingdom) James Weaver (United States) Butch Leitzinger (United Kingdom) Andy Wallace	Lola B06/10	MI	336
5	LMP1	16	(United States) Dyson Racing	(United Kingdom) James Weaver (United States) Butch Leitzinger (United Kingdom) Andy Wallace	AER P32T 3.6L Turbo V8	MI	336
6	GT1	007	(United Kingdom) Aston Martin Racing	(United Kingdom) Darren Turner (Czech Republic) Tomáš Enge (Denmark) Nicolas Kiesa	Aston Martin DBR9	P	324
6	GT1	007	(United Kingdom) Aston Martin Racing	(United Kingdom) Darren Turner (Czech Republic) Tomáš Enge (Denmark) Nicolas Kiesa	Aston Martin 6.0L V12	P	324
7	GT1	3	(United States) Corvette Racing	(Canada) Ron Fellows (United States) Johnny O'Connell (Italy) Max Papis	Chevrolet Corvette C6.R	MI	324
7	GT1	3	(United States) Corvette Racing	(Canada) Ron Fellows (United States) Johnny O'Connell (Italy) Max Papis	Chevrolet LS7r 7.0L V8	MI	324
8 DNF	LMP2	6	(United States) Penske Racing	(Germany) Lucas Luhr (Germany) Sascha Maassen (France) Emmanuel Collard	Porsche RS Spyder	MI	323
8 DNF	LMP2	6	(United States) Penske Racing	(Germany) Lucas Luhr (Germany) Sascha Maassen (France) Emmanuel Collard	Porsche MR6 3.4L V8	MI	323
9	**GT2**	**50**	**(Canada) Multimatic Motorsports Team Panoz**	**(Australia) David Brabham (Canada) Scott Maxwell (France) Sébastien Bourdais**	**Panoz Esperante GT-LM**	P	**320**
9	**GT2**	**50**	**(Canada) Multimatic Motorsports Team Panoz**	**(Australia) David Brabham (Canada) Scott Maxwell (France) Sébastien Bourdais**	**Ford (Élan) 5.0L V8**	P	**320**
10	GT2	45	(United States) Flying Lizard Motorsports	(Germany) Marc Lieb (United States) Johannes van Overbeek (United States) Jon Fogarty	Porsche 911 GT3-RSR	MI	320
10	GT2	45	(United States) Flying Lizard Motorsports	(Germany) Marc Lieb (United States) Johannes van Overbeek (United States) Jon Fogarty	Porsche 3.6L Flat-6	MI	320
11	GT2	62	(United States) Risi Competizione	(Germany) Ralf Kelleners (Brazil) Jaime Melo (United States) Anthony Lazzaro	Ferrari F430GT	MI	320
11	GT2	62	(United States) Risi Competizione	(Germany) Ralf Kelleners (Brazil) Jaime Melo (United States) Anthony Lazzaro	Ferrari 4.0L V8	MI	320
12	LMP2	41	(United States) Binnie Motorsports	(United States) William Binnie (United Kingdom) Allen Timpany (United States) Rick Sutherland	Lola B05/42	MI	317
12	LMP2	41	(United States) Binnie Motorsports	(United States) William Binnie (United Kingdom) Allen Timpany (United States) Rick Sutherland	Zytek ZG348 3.4L V8	MI	317
13	GT2	44	(United States) Flying Lizard Motorsports	(United States) Darren Law (United States) Seth Neiman (United States) Lonnie Pechnik	Porsche 911 GT3-RSR	MI	315
13	GT2	44	(United States) Flying Lizard Motorsports	(United States) Darren Law (United States) Seth Neiman (United States) Lonnie Pechnik	Porsche 3.6L Flat-6	MI	315
14	GT2	80	(United Kingdom) Team LNT	(United Kingdom) Richard Dean (United Kingdom) Lawrence Tomlinson (United Kingdom) Tom Kimber-Smith	Panoz Esperante GT-LM	P	312
14	GT2	80	(United Kingdom) Team LNT	(United Kingdom) Richard Dean (United Kingdom) Lawrence Tomlinson (United Kingdom) Tom Kimber-Smith	Ford (Élan) 5.0L V8	P	312
15	GT2	23	(United States) Alex Job Racing	(Germany) Mike Rockenfeller (Germany) Klaus Graf (United States) Graham Rahal	Porsche 911 GT3-RSR	MI	311
15	GT2	23	(United States) Alex Job Racing	(Germany) Mike Rockenfeller (Germany) Klaus Graf (United States) Graham Rahal	Porsche 3.6L Flat-6	MI	311
16	LMP2	33	(France) Barazi-Epsilon	(Netherlands) Michael Vergers (Denmark) Juan Barazi (United Kingdom) Elton Julian	Courage C65	MI	293
16	LMP2	33	(France) Barazi-Epsilon	(Netherlands) Michael Vergers (Denmark) Juan Barazi (United Kingdom) Elton Julian	AER P07 2.0L Turbo I4	MI	293
17	GT2	31	(United States) Petersen Motorsports (United States) White Lightning Racing	(Germany) Jörg Bergmeister (Germany) Tim Bergmeister (Sweden) Niclas Jönsson	Porsche 911 GT3-RSR	MI	292
17	GT2	31	(United States) Petersen Motorsports (United States) White Lightning Racing	(Germany) Jörg Bergmeister (Germany) Tim Bergmeister (Sweden) Niclas Jönsson	Porsche 3.6L Flat-6	MI	292
18	GT2	86	(Netherlands) Spyker Squadron b.v.	(Netherlands) Jeroen Bleekemolen (Netherlands) Mike Hezemans	Spyker C8 Spyder GT2-R	MI	281
18	GT2	86	(Netherlands) Spyker Squadron b.v.	(Netherlands) Jeroen Bleekemolen (Netherlands) Mike Hezemans	Audi 3.8L V8	MI	281
19	GT1	25	(Germany) Konrad Motorsport	(United States) Terry Borcheller (France) Jean-Philippe Belloc (United States) Tom Weickardt	Saleen S7-R	P	275
19	GT1	25	(Germany) Konrad Motorsport	(United States) Terry Borcheller (France) Jean-Philippe Belloc (United States) Tom Weickardt	Ford 7.0L V8	P	275
20 DNF	GT2	79	(United States) J-3 Racing	(United Kingdom) Tim Sugden (Germany) Wolf Henzler (United States) Jim Matthews	Porsche 911 GT3-RSR	Y	267
20 DNF	GT2	79	(United States) J-3 Racing	(United Kingdom) Tim Sugden (Germany) Wolf Henzler (United States) Jim Matthews	Porsche 3.6L Flat-6	Y	267
21 DNF	GT2	78	(United States) J-3 Racing	(United States) Spencer Pumpelly (United States) Jep Thorton (United States) Mark Patterson	Porsche 911 GT3-RSR	Y	263
21 DNF	GT2	78	(United States) J-3 Racing	(United States) Spencer Pumpelly (United States) Jep Thorton (United States) Mark Patterson	Porsche 3.6L Flat-6	Y	263
22 DNF	LMP2	8	(United States) B-K Motorsports	(United States) Guy Cosmo (United States) James Bach (Brazil) Raphael Matos	Courage C65	G	262
22 DNF	LMP2	8	(United States) B-K Motorsports	(United States) Guy Cosmo (United States) James Bach (Brazil) Raphael Matos	Mazda R20B 2.0L 3-rotor	G	262
23	GT2	85	(Netherlands) Spyker Squadron b.v.	(Netherlands) Donny Crevels (Netherlands) Peter Kox	Spyker C8 Spyder GT-2	MI	248
23	GT2	85	(Netherlands) Spyker Squadron b.v.	(Netherlands) Donny Crevels (Netherlands) Peter Kox	Audi 3.8L V8	MI	248
24 DNF	GT2	55	(Germany) Farnbacher Loles Racing	(Germany) Dominik Farnbacher (Germany) Pierre Ehret (Denmark) Lars-Erik Nielsen	Porsche 911 GT3-RSR	Y	198
24 DNF	GT2	55	(Germany) Farnbacher Loles Racing	(Germany) Dominik Farnbacher (Germany) Pierre Ehret (Denmark) Lars-Erik Nielsen	Porsche 3.6L Flat-6	Y	198
25 DNF	GT2	21	(United States) BMW Team PTG	(United States) Bill Auberlen (United States) Joey Hand (United States) Ian James	BMW M3 GTR	Y	197
25 DNF	GT2	21	(United States) BMW Team PTG	(United States) Bill Auberlen (United States) Joey Hand (United States) Ian James	BMW 3.2L I6	Y	197
26 DNF	LMP2	7	(United States) Penske Racing	(Germany) Timo Bernhard (France) Romain Dumas (United States) Patrick Long	Porsche RS Spyder	MI	193
26 DNF	LMP2	7	(United States) Penske Racing	(Germany) Timo Bernhard (France) Romain Dumas (United States) Patrick Long	Porsche MR6 3.4L V8	MI	193
27 DNF	LMP1	20	(United States) Dyson Racing	(United Kingdom) Guy Smith (United States) Chris Dyson	Lola B06/10	MI	173
27 DNF	LMP1	20	(United States) Dyson Racing	(United Kingdom) Guy Smith (United States) Chris Dyson	AER P32T 3.6L Turbo V8	MI	173
28 NC	GT2	56	(Czech Republic) Vonka Racing	(Czech Republic) Jan Vonka (Italy) Mauro Casadei (United Kingdom) Bo McCormick	Porsche 911 GT3-RS	D	130
28 NC	GT2	56	(Czech Republic) Vonka Racing	(Czech Republic) Jan Vonka (Italy) Mauro Casadei (United Kingdom) Bo McCormick	Porsche 3.6L Flat-6	D	130
29 DNF	LMP1	9	(United States) Highcroft Racing	(United States) Duncan Dayton (United Kingdom) Gregor Fisken (United States) Richard Knoop	MG-Lola EX257	D	128
29 DNF	LMP1	9	(United States) Highcroft Racing	(United States) Duncan Dayton (United Kingdom) Gregor Fisken (United States) Richard Knoop	AER P07 2.0L Turbo I4	D	128
30 DNF	GT2	22	(United States) BMW Team PTG	(United States) Justin Marks (United States) Bryan Sellers (Germany) Martin Jensen	BMW M3 GTR	Y	124
30 DNF	GT2	22	(United States) BMW Team PTG	(United States) Justin Marks (United States) Bryan Sellers (Germany) Martin Jensen	BMW 3.4L I6	Y	124
31 DNF	LMP1	12	(United States) Autocon Motorsports	(United States) Michael Lewis (United States) Chris McMurry (United States) Bryan Willman	MG-Lola EX257	D	121
31 DNF	LMP1	12	(United States) Autocon Motorsports	(United States) Michael Lewis (United States) Chris McMurry (United States) Bryan Willman	AER P07 2.0L Turbo I4	D	121
32 DNF	LMP1	1	(United States) Audi Sport North America	(Germany) Frank Biela (Germany) Marco Werner (Italy) Emanuele Pirro	Audi R10 TDI	MI	117
32 DNF	LMP1	1	(United States) Audi Sport North America	(Germany) Frank Biela (Germany) Marco Werner (Italy) Emanuele Pirro	Audi TDI 5.5L Turbo V12 (Diesel)	MI	117
33 DNF	GT2	51	(Canada) Multimatic Motorsports Team Panoz	(United States) Gunnar Jeannette (United States) Tommy Milner (Brazil) Bruno Junqueira	Panoz Esperante GT-LM	P	71
33 DNF	GT2	51	(Canada) Multimatic Motorsports Team Panoz	(United States) Gunnar Jeannette (United States) Tommy Milner (Brazil) Bruno Junqueira	Ford (Élan) 5.0L V8	P	71
34 DNF	GT1	26	(Germany) Konrad Motorsport	(Italy) Fabio Babini (Italy) Paolo Ruberti (United Kingdom) Jamie Davies	Saleen S7-R	P	66
34 DNF	GT1	26	(Germany) Konrad Motorsport	(Italy) Fabio Babini (Italy) Paolo Ruberti (United Kingdom) Jamie Davies	Ford 7.0L V8	P	66
35 DNF	LMP2	10	(United States) Miracle Motorsports	(United States) Andy Lally (United States) James Gue	Courage C65	KU	62
35 DNF	LMP2	10	(United States) Miracle Motorsports	(United States) Andy Lally (United States) James Gue	AER P07 2.0L Turbo I4	KU	62

== Statistics ==
- Pole Position - #2 Audi Sport North America - 1:45.828
- Fastest Lap - #2 Audi Sport North America - 1:48.373
- Distance - 1,291.3 miles (2,078.1 km)
- Average Speed - 107.319 mph (172.713 km/h)

American Le Mans Series
Previous race: None	2006 season	Next race: 2006 Lone Star Grand Prix
