= TVR 400SE =

British sports car

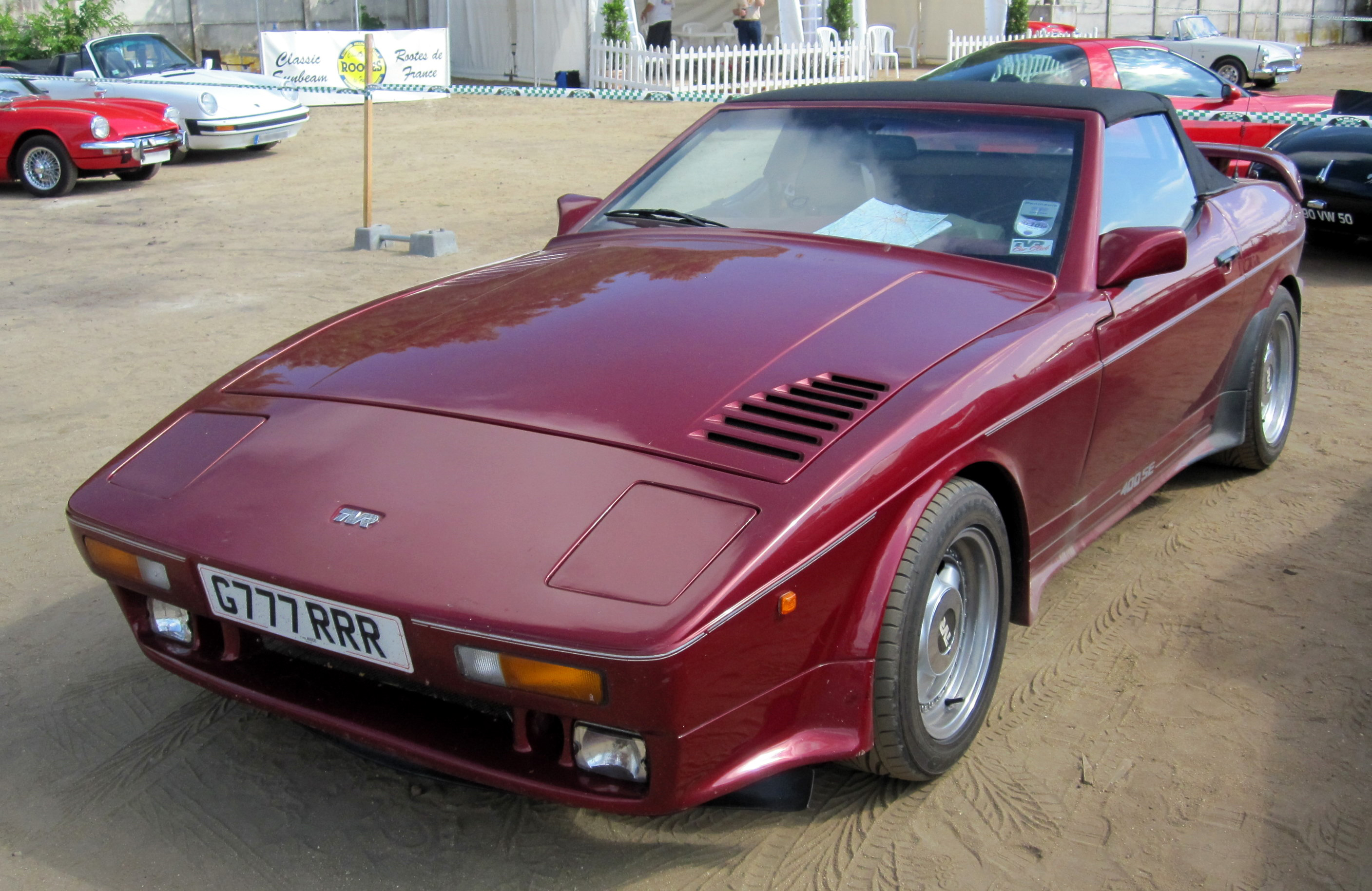

Overview
- Manufacturer: TVR
- Also called: TVR 400SX; TVR 430SE; TVR 450SE
- Production: 1988–1991; 287 produced
- Assembly: United Kingdom: Blackpool, England
- Designer: Oliver Winterbottom

Body and chassis
- Class: Sports car
- Body style: 2-door convertible
- Layout: FR layout
- Platform: TVR Wedge

Powertrain
- Engine: 3.9–4.4 L TVR Power Rover V8
- Transmission: 5 spd manual

Chronology
- Predecessor: TVR 390SE
- Successor: TVR Griffith

The TVR 400/450SE is a series of open sports cars designed and built by TVR from 1988 to 1991. The 400SE was introduced in 1988, the 450SE a year later. The 400SE was the last of the Wedges built, with the last cars being produced in late 1991 and registered in 1992. There were also a handful of special versions built, including two Sprintex supercharged 400SX in 1989, and three Griffith-engined 430SEs constructed in 1991.

== History ==
The 400SE was largely similar to late 390SEs, but featured marginally larger displacement - 3,948 versus 3,905 cc. The body was as for Series 2 390SEs, with the more rounded nose and a large rear underbody aerofoil. An asymmetrically vented bonnet was deemed necessary to dispel the additional heat of the larger, more powerful engine, and there was also a large rear spoiler (smaller than the 'bathtray' style used on the SEAC, but still large). The appearance was considerably more mature than the wild SEAC, but both suffered from the large transmission tunnel which cramped the footwell and serious heatsink from the large engines. On the plus side was the "phenomenal noise" and "exhilarating acceleration". Ventilated front disc brakes and fifteen inch wheels were standard fitment, with power steering available and later made standard.

There was also the 1989 400SX, a supercharged version developed by "Northern TVR Centre" in Barrow-in-Furness. Along with DPR Forced Induction Systems Sprintex supercharger units were fitted. While power and torque outputs are unknown, the smaller engined 350SX showed increases of over thirty percent. The supercharged versions provided additional mid-range punch compared to the peakier, naturally aspirated models.

== 450SE ==
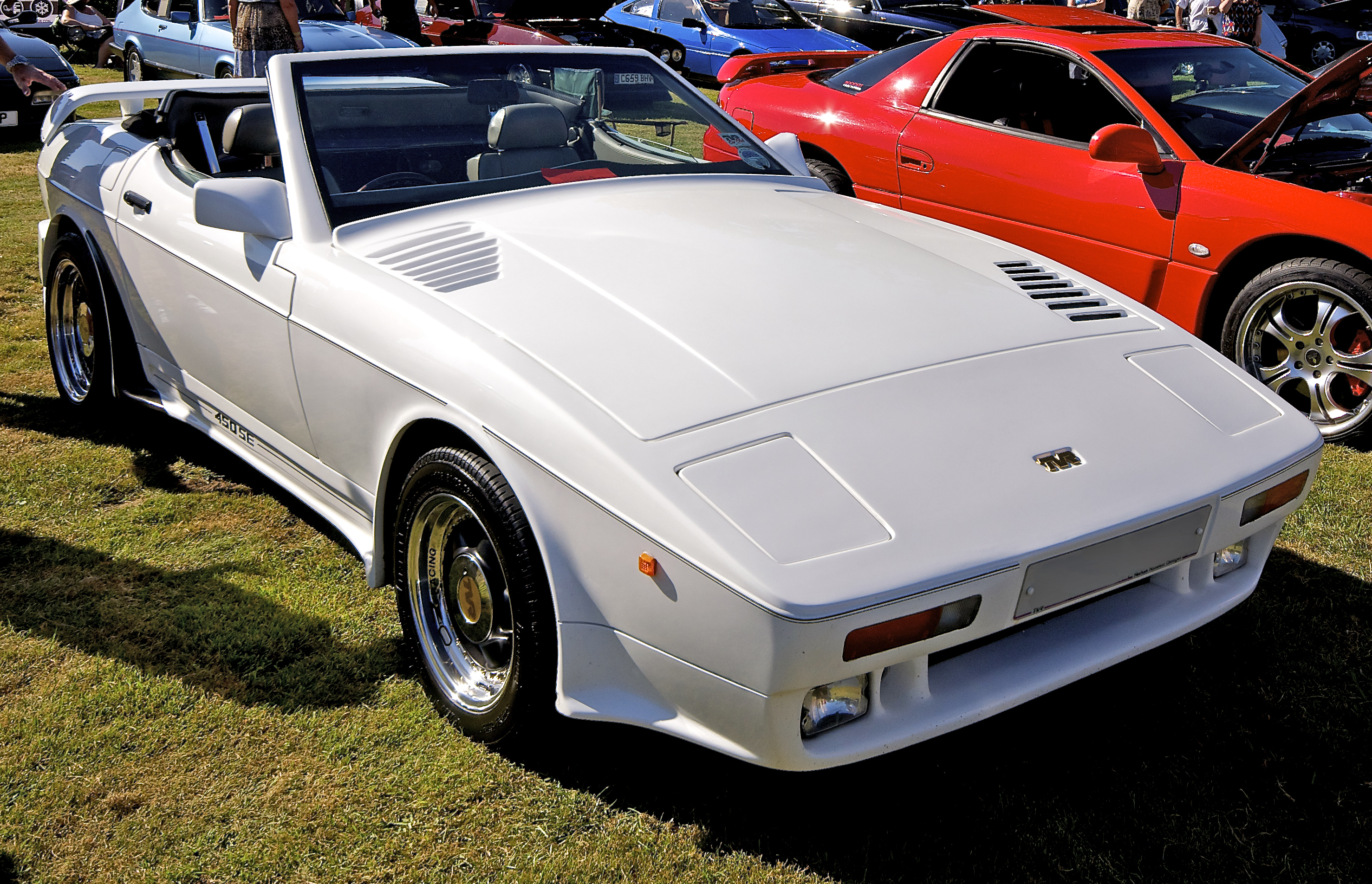
1989 TVR 450SE

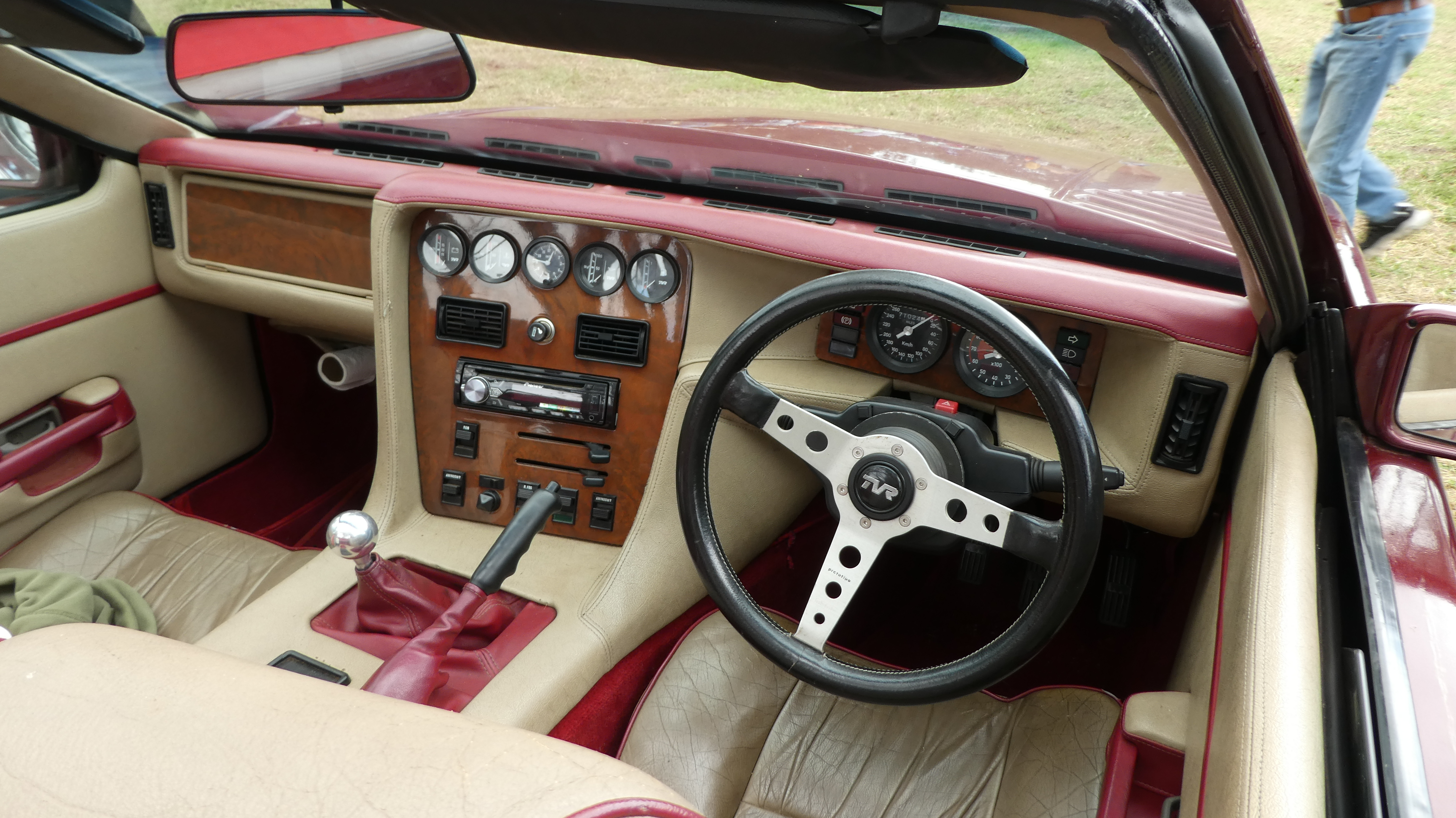
1989 TVR 450SE interior

In 1989 the even bigger engined 450SE appeared, with an extra 45 bhp but otherwise hard to distinguish from the 400. Production of the 450SE ended in 1990 after 35 had been built.

The last development of the SE was the 430SE, three of which were built in 1991. They used the 4.3-litre V8 engine also seen in the recently introduced TVR Griffith; one of them was shown at the 1991 Birmingham Motor Show.

== Specifications ==
Version	400SE	450SE	430SE
Production	1988–1991	1989–1990	1991
Engine	TVR Power Rover V8, EFi OHV
Displacement	3,948 cc	4,441 cc	4,280 cc
Displacement	94.0 x 71.12 mm	94.0 x 80.0 mm	94.0 x 77.1 mm
Power	275 bhp (205 kW; 279 PS) at 5,500 rpm	320 bhp (239 kW; 324 PS) at 5,700 rpm	280 bhp (209 kW; 284 PS) at 5,500 rpm
Torque	270 lb⋅ft (366 N⋅m) at 3,500 rpm	310 lb⋅ft (420 N⋅m) at 4,000 rpm	305 lb⋅ft (414 N⋅m) at 4,000 rpm
Top Speed	145 mph (233 km/h)	150 mph (241 km/h)	n/a
Acceleration (0–60 mph)	5.6 sec	5.2 sec	n/a
Acceleration (0–100 mph)	14.8 sec	n/a	n/a
Chassis	Tubular spaceframe, rear-wheel drive
Body	Fibreglass, 2-seater convertible
Weight	1,160 kg (2,557 lb)	1,216 kg (2,681 lb)
Transmission	Five speed gearbox (LT77)
Wheels	225/50 VR15, 8J x 15 rims
Wheelbase	2,387 mm (94.0 in)
Track (F/R)	1,450 / 1,480 mm (57.1 / 58.3 in)
Length/Width/ Height	4,013 / 1,728 / 1,205 mm (158.0 / 68.0 / 47.5 in)
