= TVR 350i =

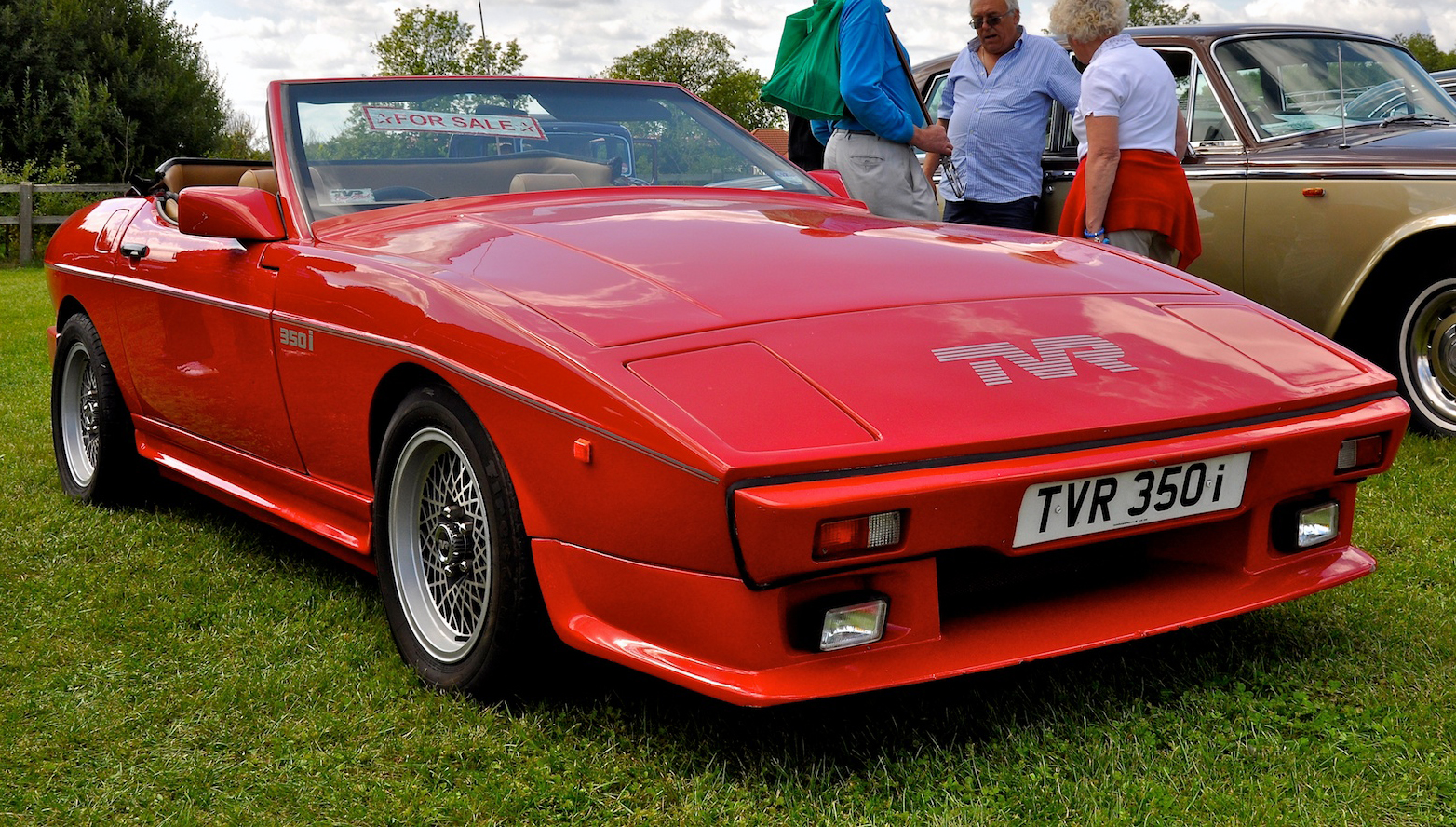
- 1987 TVR 350i convertible

Overview
- Manufacturer: TVR
- Also called: TVR Tasmin 350i TVR 350SX
- Production: August 1983–1989; 949 produced
- Assembly: United Kingdom: Blackpool, England
- Designer: Oliver Winterbottom

Body and chassis
- Class: Sports car
- Body style: 2-door coupé 2-door convertible
- Layout: FR layout
- Platform: TVR Wedge
- Related: TVR 390SE

Powertrain
- Engine: 3.5 L Rover V8
- Transmission: 5-speed manual

Dimensions
- Wheelbase: 94 in (2,388 mm)
- Length: 161 in (4,089 mm) (convertible 158 in (4,013mm))
- Width: 68 in (1,727 mm)
- Height: 47.5 in (1,206 mm)
- Curb weight: 2,209–2,213 lb (1,002–1,004 kg) (convertible)

Chronology
- Predecessor: TVR Tasmin 280i

The TVR 350i is a sports car built by British company TVR from 1983 until 1989. In 1982 TVR's then new owner Peter Wheeler found himself wanting more power than the Cologne V6-equipped Tasmin 280i could offer. Thus, based on the existing car the TVR Tasmin 350i appeared in August 1983. Using the same chassis and body (with some minor changes), a 3.5-litre Rover V8 was installed. After a year, the "Tasmin" part of the name was dropped and the car became just TVR 350i.

== Development ==
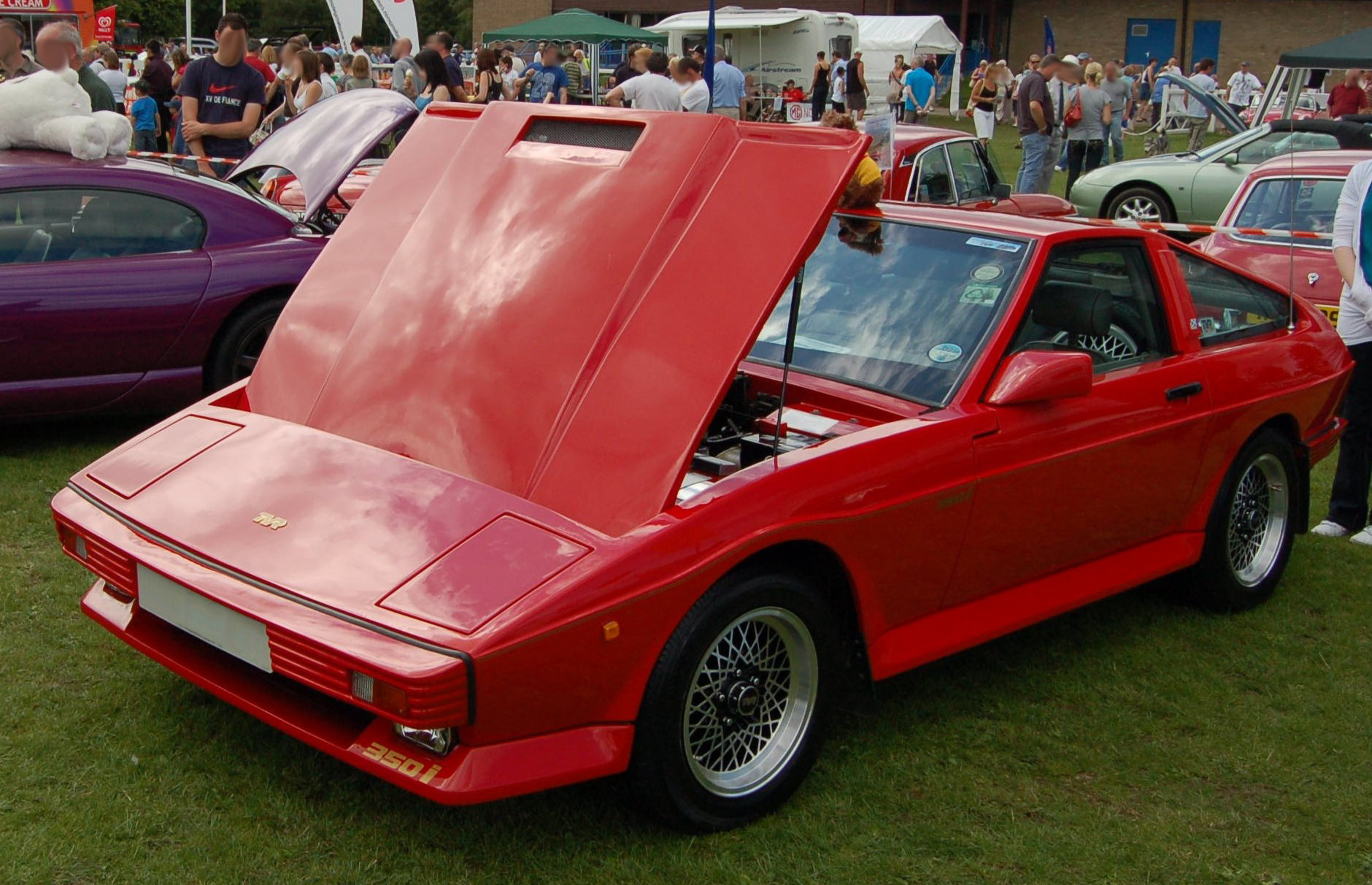
TVR 350i coupé

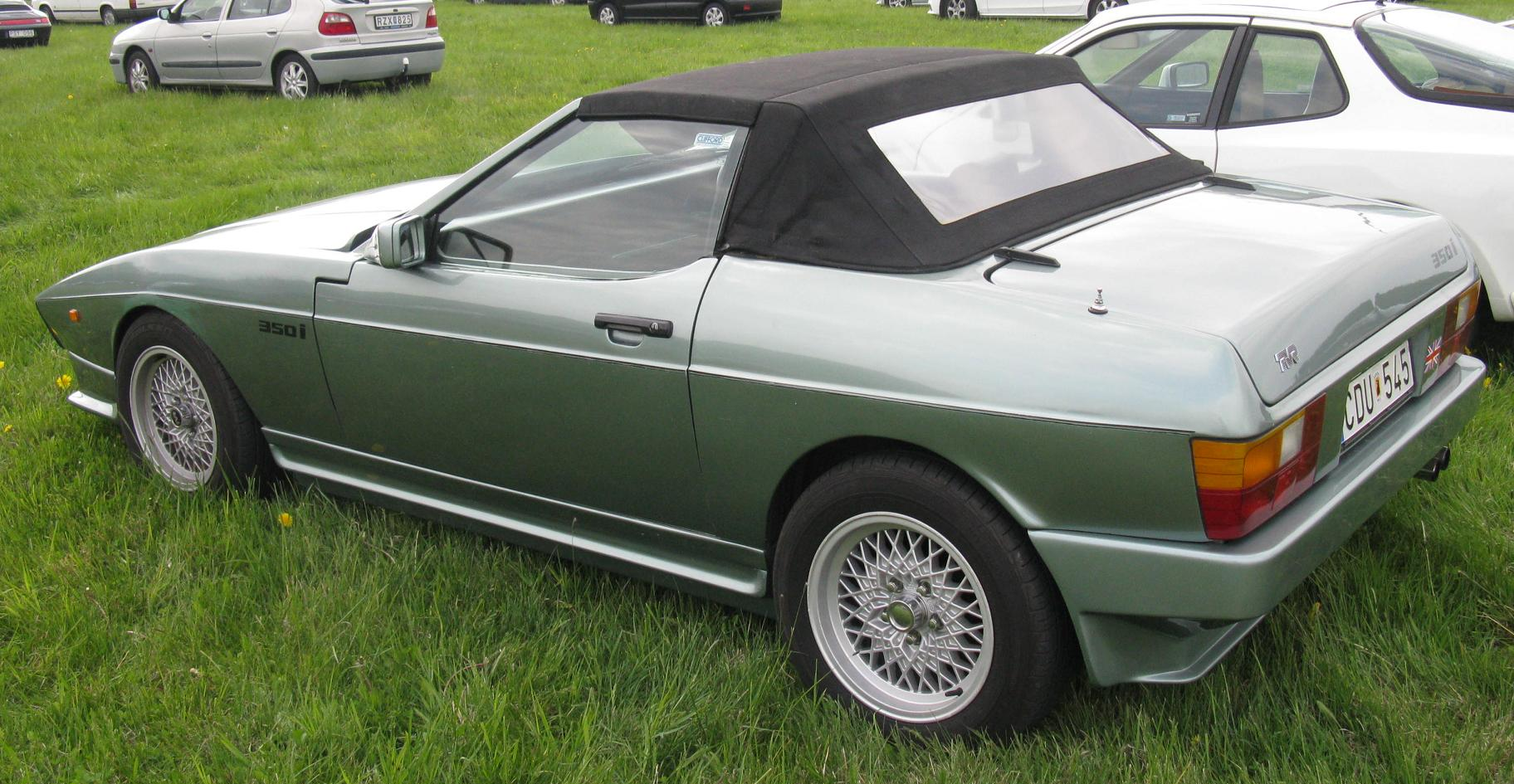
TVR 350i convertible

The 3.5 L V8 produced 197 hp (147 kW) at 5280 rpm and 220 lb⋅ft (298 N⋅m) of torque at 4000 rpm, propelling the 350i to a top speed of between 130–135 mph (209–217 km/h), while 0-60 mph (97 km/h) took between 6.3 and 6.5 seconds. The factory claimed the coupe version was capable of a top speed of 10mph above that of the convertible (the owners handbook stated a top speed of 146mph). The Rover-engined 350i provided the added benefit of being marketable in Arab countries, where there was a certain political resistance to buying Ford products because of Ford's close dealings with Israel.

There was also a short run of non-factory Sprintex supercharged 350SX (and the bigger hearted 400SX) made by the Northern TVR Centre in the mid-1980s. Nine and two of the respective versions are thought to have been built. Power is not certain, but 260 bhp (194 kW) for the 350SX is commonly cited.

The 350i provided the basis for the 390SE first seen at the Birmingham Motor Show in October 1984, as well as the extreme 420/450 SEAC and other future developments. A modified form of the 350i's chassis, itself a stretched version of the chassis used for the old M-series, also underpinned the S-series as well as the later Griffith. By 1989, after the introduction of the 400/450SE and 420/450 SEAC, the lineup was rationalized and the by now least powerful 350i was dropped. Over 1,000 350i's were built. The end of the run was marked by the limited edition (25 examples only) 3.9-litre TVR 350SE of 1990-91.
