= TVR Wedges =

Series of wedge-shaped sports cars

The TVR Wedges are a series of wedge-shaped sports cars built by British specialist sports car manufacturer TVR between 1980 and 1991. There were 2-seat convertibles and 2-seater or 2+2 liftback coupés, with four-, six- and eight-cylinder engines from a variety of manufacturers. The name refers to their sharp-nosed angular shape, particular to the late seventies when they were designed.

The Tasmin name was typically used on the 200 and 280i TVRs, as well as for early 350i versions.

TVR Wedges
TVR Tasmin 280i/ 280i 1980–1987	TVR Tasmin 200; 1981–1984	TVR Tasmin 350i/ 350i/ 350SX; 1983–1989	TVR 350SE; 1990–1991
TVR 390SE; 1984–1988	TVR 420SE; 1986–1987	TVR 400SE/ 400SX; 1988–1991	TVR 450SE/ 430SE; 1989–1991
	TVR 420 SEAC; 1986–1988		TVR 450 SEAC; 1988–1989
