= TVR 390SE =

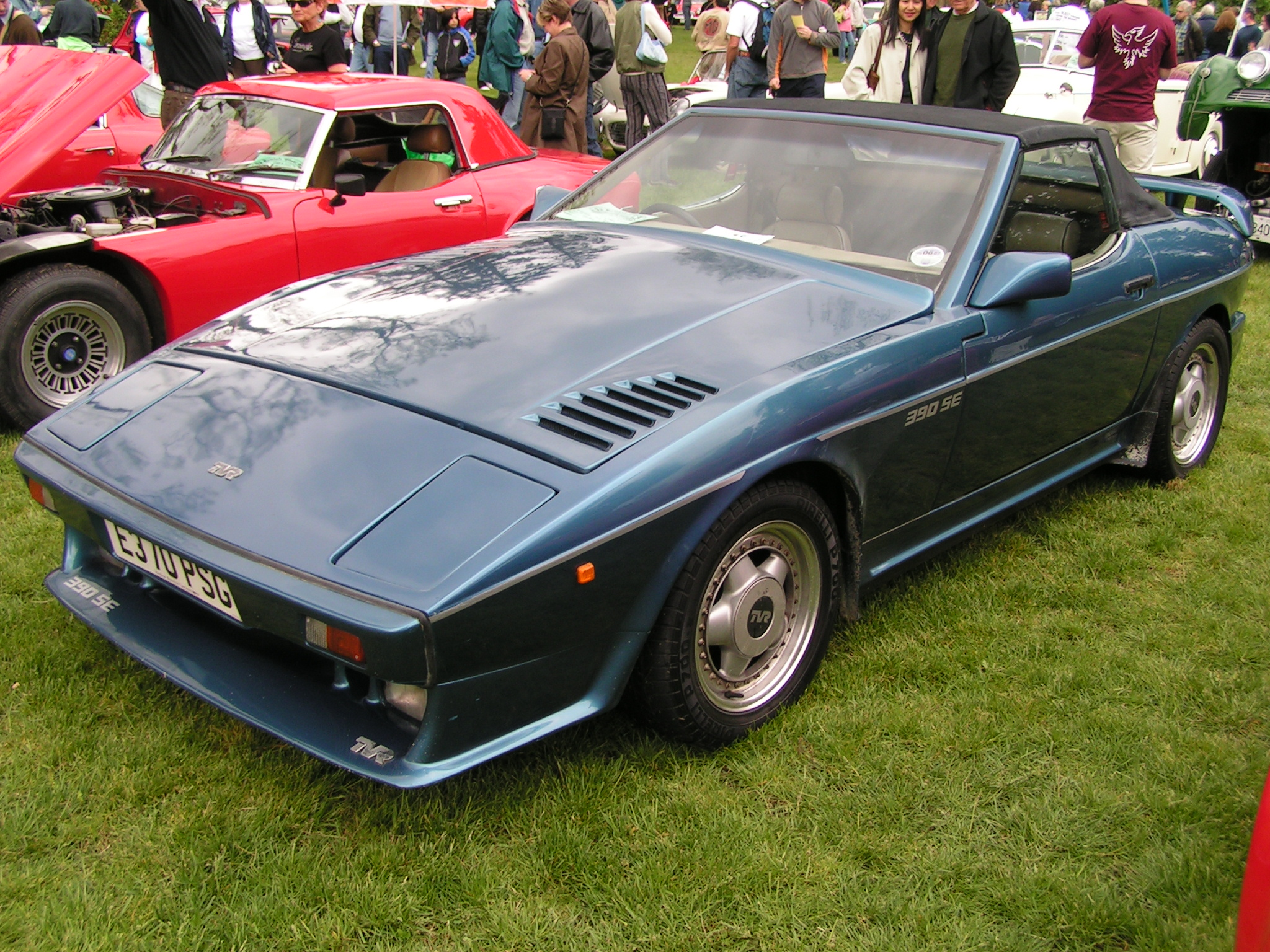

Overview
- Manufacturer: TVR
- Also called: TVR 420SE
- Production: 1984–1989; 103 produced
- Assembly: United Kingdom: Blackpool, England
- Designer: Oliver Winterbottom

Body and chassis
- Class: Sports car
- Body style: 2-door convertible
- Layout: FR layout
- Platform: TVR Wedge
- Related: TVR 350i

Powertrain
- Engine: TVR Power Rover V8
- Transmission: 5-speed manual

Chronology
- Successor: TVR 400SE

The TVR 390SE is a sports car designed and built by TVR. It was introduced in October 1984. It featured many novelties not found in other 'Wedge' TVRs before and was also the most powerful one yet. It never received British Type Approval, so technically speaking the 390SE was just a 350i with special equipment fitted.

== History ==
TVR Engineering worked with Andy Rouse, a Rover Tuning specialist to produce a blueprinted engine, turning out an extra 85 bhp (63 kW; 86 PS), taking it to a claimed 275 bhp (205 kW; 279 PS). The engine achieved these numbers by increasing the capacity of the engine to 3,905 cc, along with high-lift camshafts, gas-flowed cylinder heads with large valves and Cosworth-machined pistons. A stronger clutch, limited-slip differential and wider Yokohama tyres were fitted to help get the extra power down onto the road.

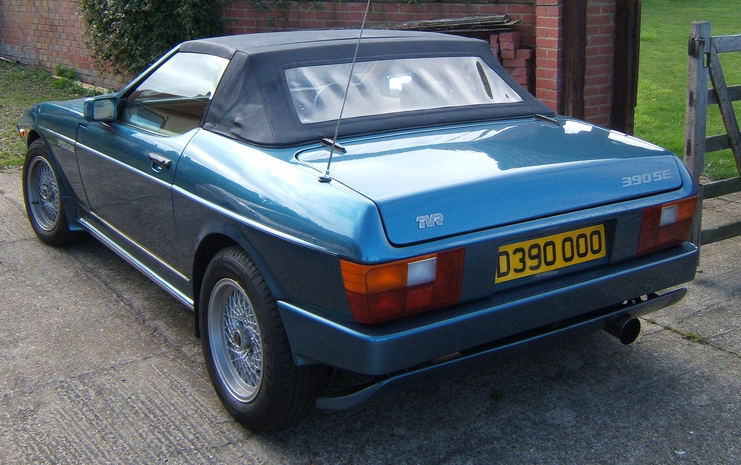
Rear view

The styling of the car was also revised with a deeper front air dam, and a rear under body aerofoil. Subsequent updating saw the bodyshell gain flared wheelarches and different sills. Ventilated front disc brakes and 15-inch wheels were part of the package as well. A Series 2 car appeared in 1988 with the most obvious difference being a rounder nose.

Production of the modified Rover V8 was handled by different engineering companies throughout the car's life with most units being produced by North Coventry Kawasaki (NCK); which company was subsequently purchased by TVR to become their in-house engine division, TVR Power. About 100 390SEs were built.

Owing to the United Kingdom 'Type Approval' rules, it was not economical for TVR to homologate the small-volume 390SE as a separate model from their more common '350i' so the customer was invoiced for the car and engine work separately. Therefore most 390SEs are officially registered as 3.5 litre cars.

== 420SE ==
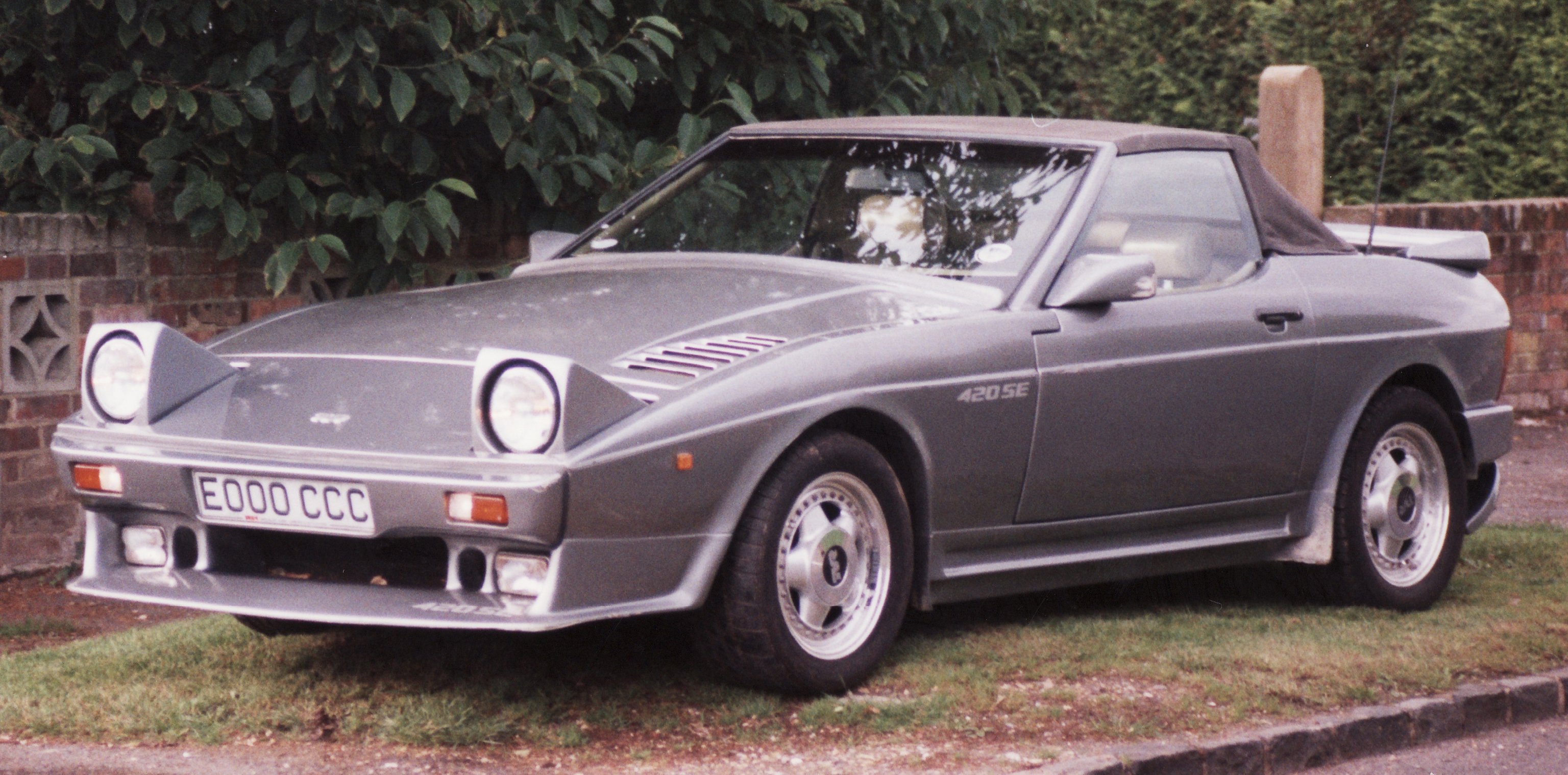
1987 TVR 420SE

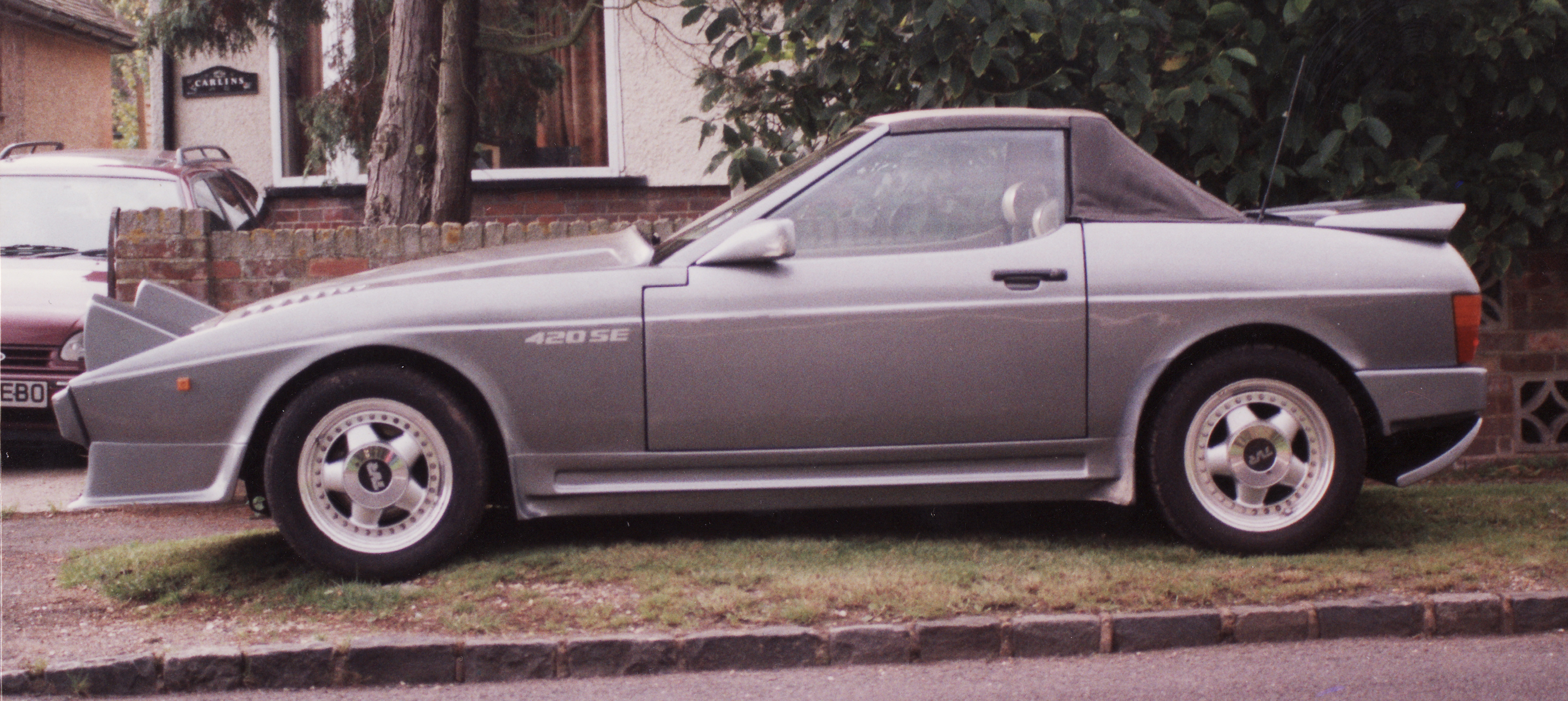
1987 TVR 420SE

At the customer's request, further engine work could be performed taking the V8 to 4.2 L capacity - thus creating the '420SE' in the process, of which only seven were built in 1986 and 1987. These cars were development cars for the 4.2-litre V8 used in the later, wilder 420 SEAC. The SE, in addition to more restrained bodywork, also featured milder cams than did the SEAC. However, due to the development status and its being handbuilt, the specs of each 420SE built are likely to differ.

== Specifications ==
Version	390SE	420SE
Engine	TVR Power Rover V8, EFi
Displacement	3,905 cc	4,228 cc
Displacement		93.5 x 77.1 mm
Power	275 bhp (205 kW; 279 PS) at 5,500 rpm	300 bhp (224 kW; 304 PS) at 5,500 rpm
Torque	270 lb⋅ft (366 N⋅m) at 3,500 rpm	290 lb⋅ft (393 N⋅m) at 4,500 rpm
Top Speed	144 mph (232 km/h)	n/a
Acceleration (0–60 mph)	5.6 sec	n/a
Acceleration (0–100 mph)	14.9 sec	n/a
Chassis	Tubular spaceframe, rear-wheel drive
Body	Fibreglass, 2-seater convertible
Weight	1,150 kg (2,535 lb)	1,150 kg (2,535 lb)
Transmission	5-speed gearbox (LT77)
Wheelbase	2,387 mm (94.0 in)
Track (F/R)	1,450 / 1,480 mm (57.1 / 58.3 in)
Length/Width/ Height	4,013 / 1,728 / 1,205 mm (158.0 / 68.0 / 47.5 in)
