= TVR 350SE =

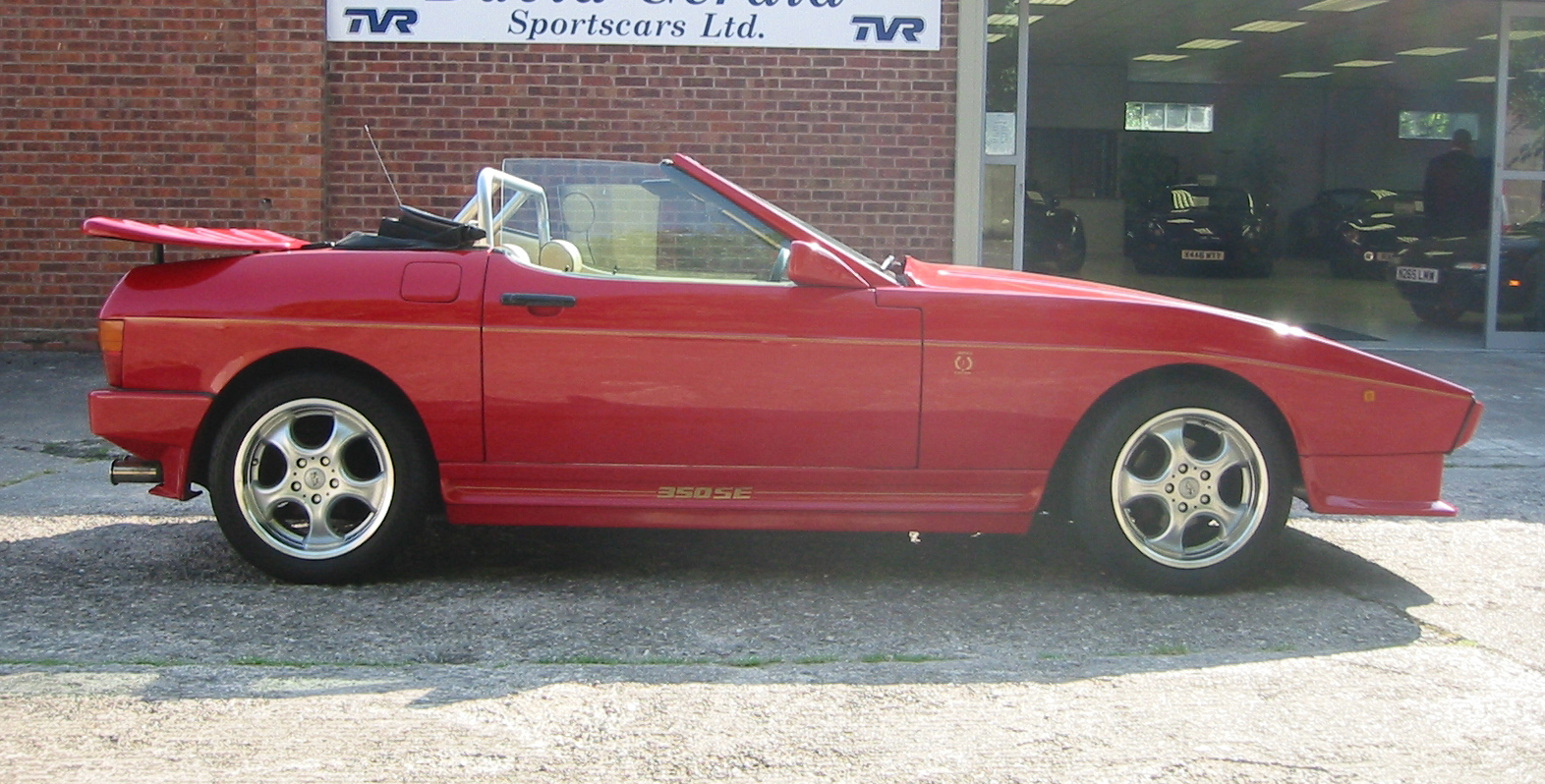
350SE number 1

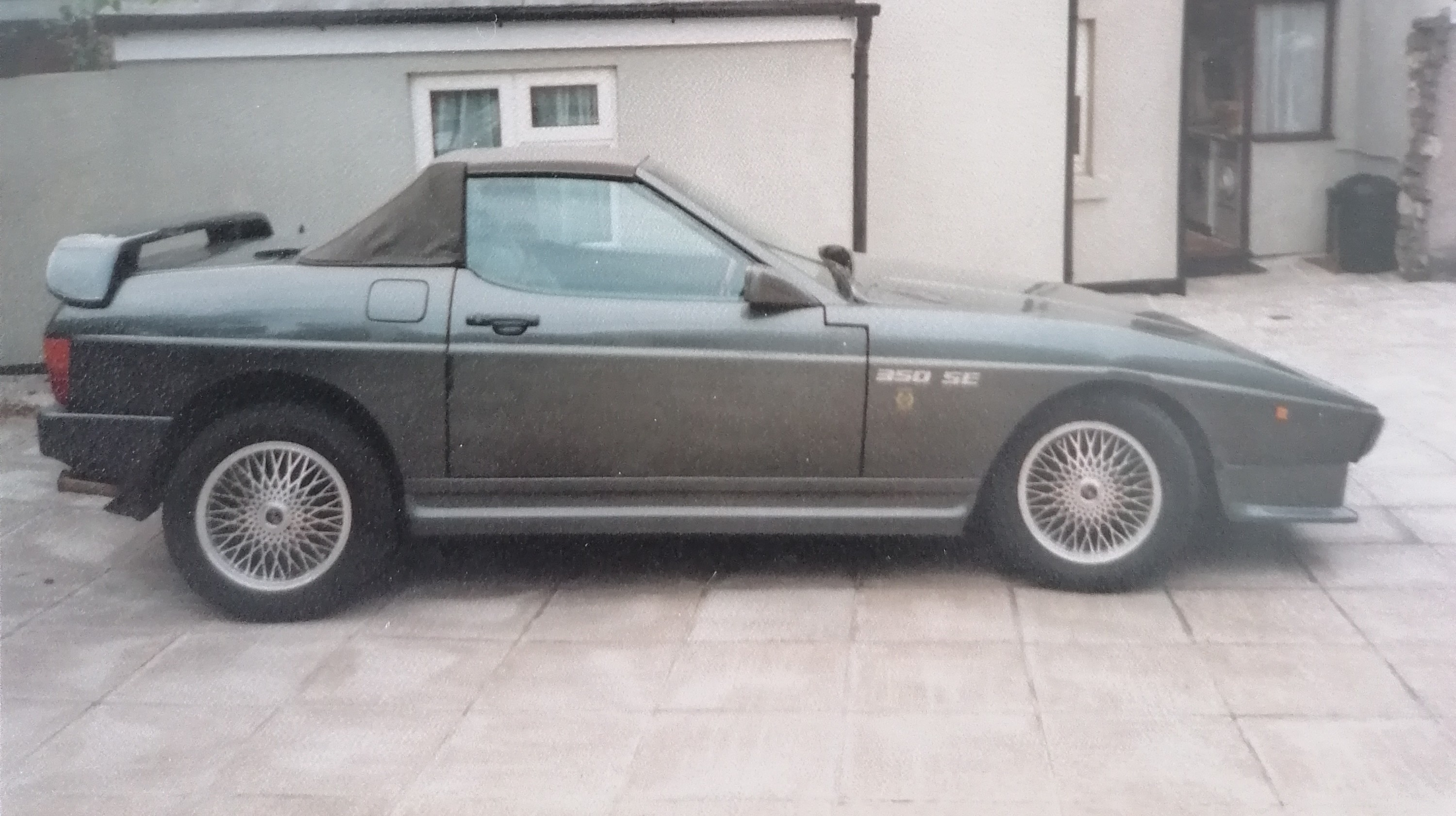
TVR 350SE number 20

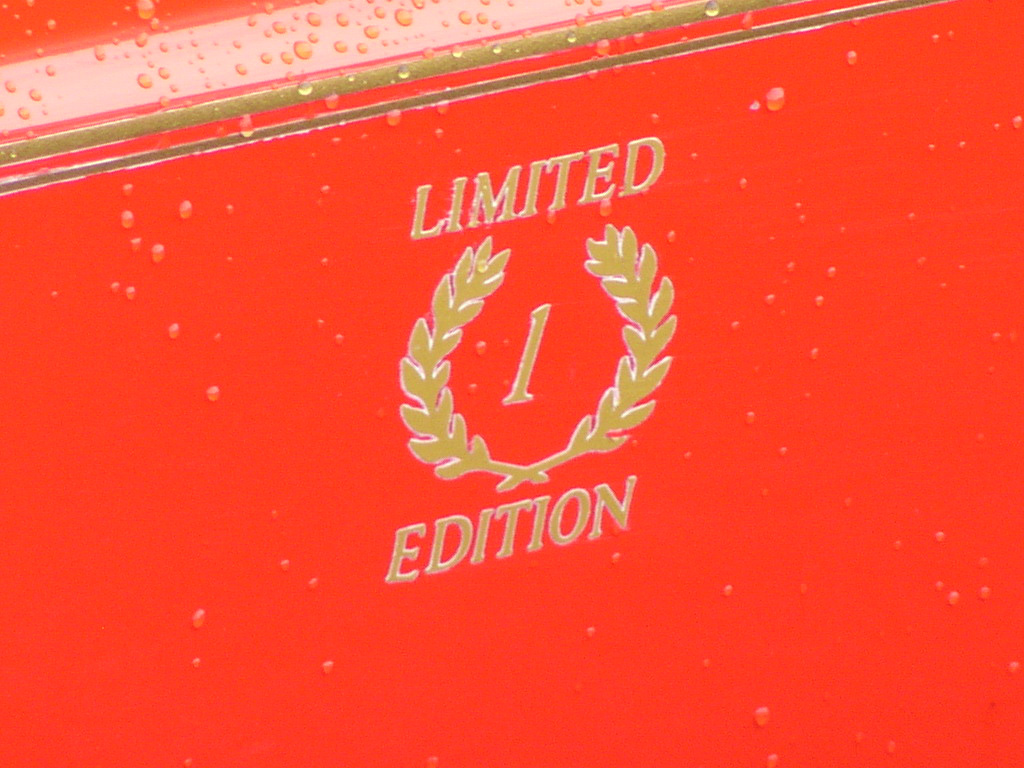
350SE number 1

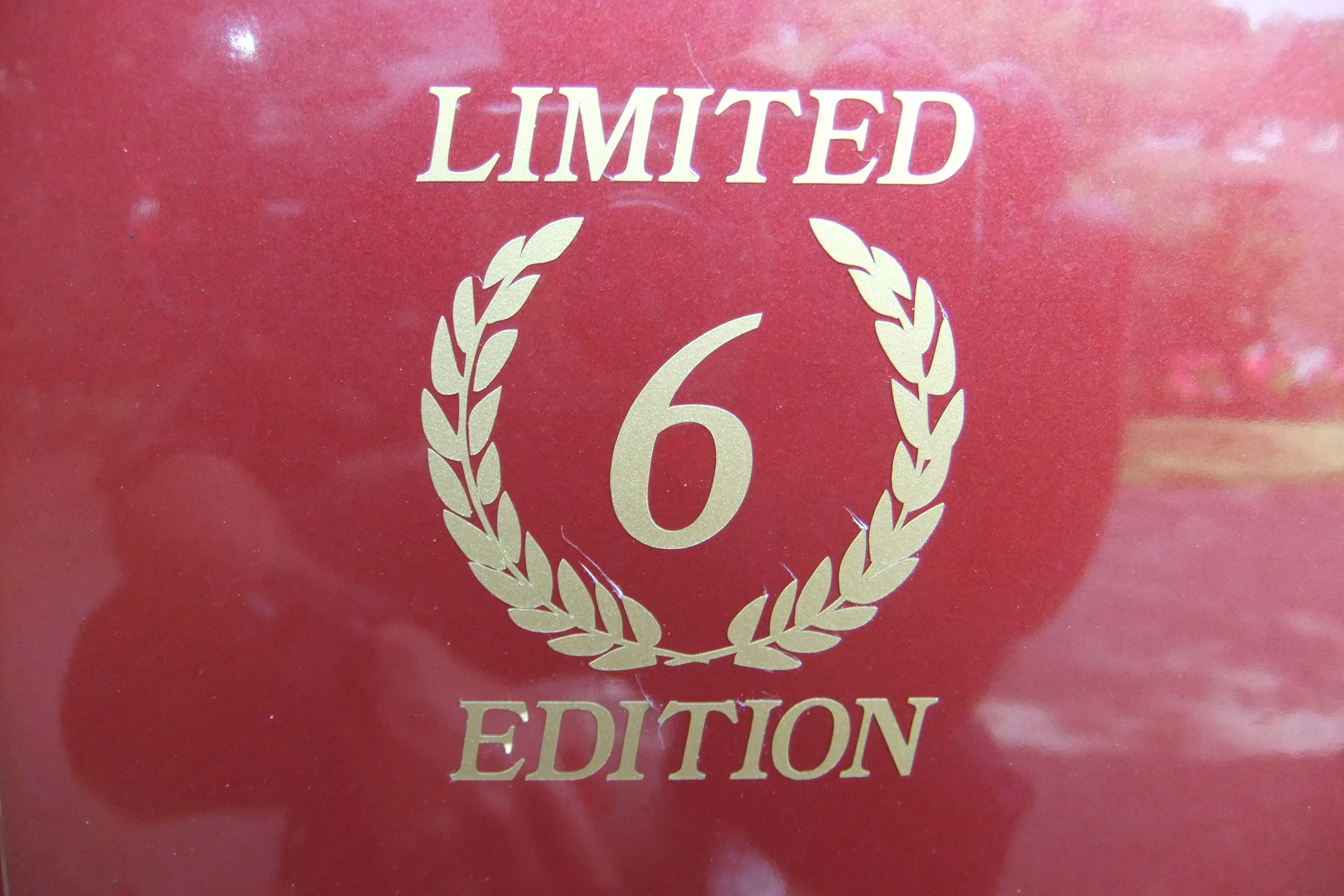
350SE number 6

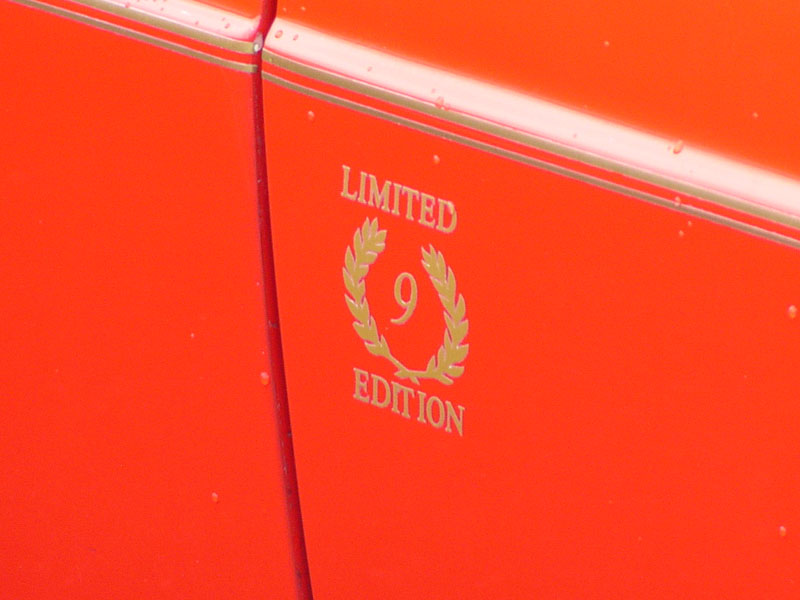
350SE number 9

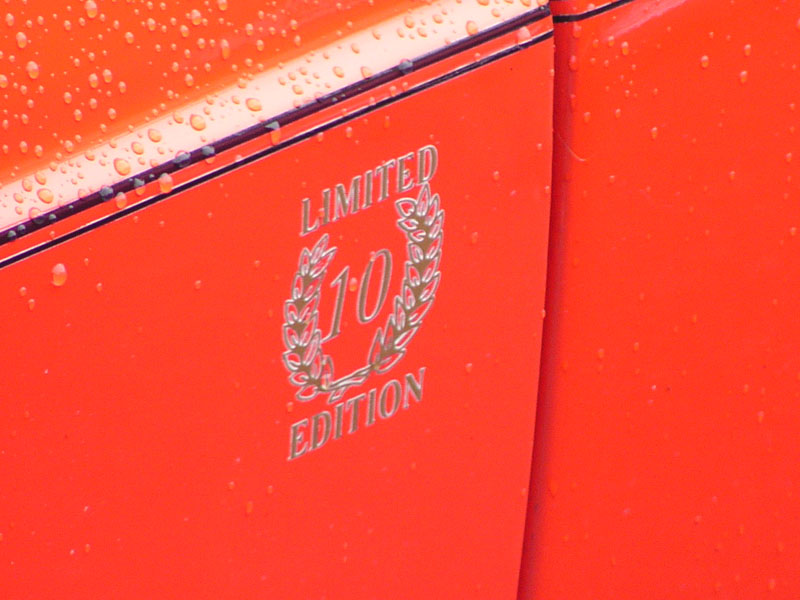
350SE number 10

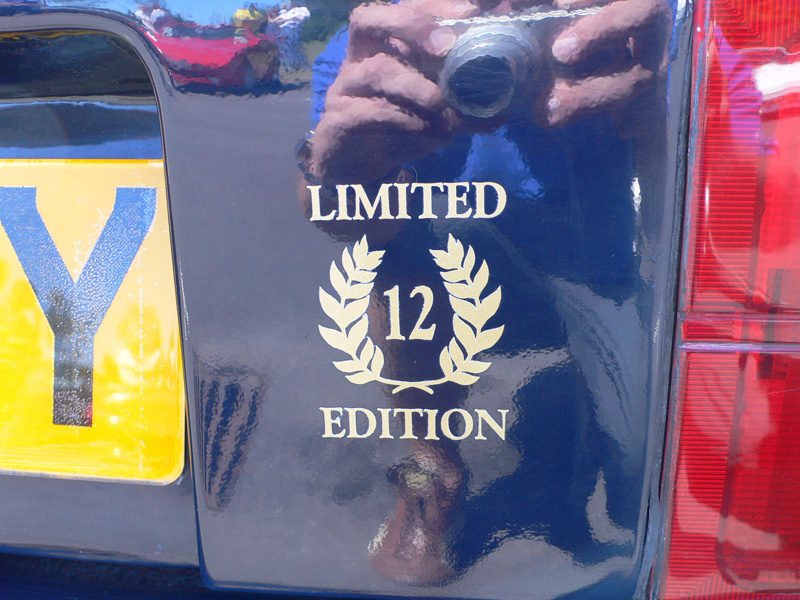
350SE number 12

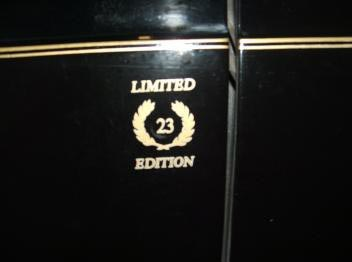
350SE number 23

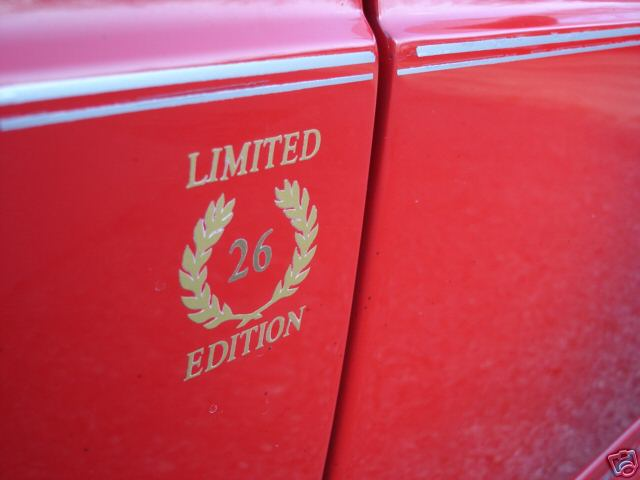
350SE number 26

The TVR 350SE is a sports car designed and built by TVR in 1990 and 1991. TVR Engineering Limited produced a limited production run of 25 specially prepared 350's to mark the end of the "Wedge" era 350i. This commemorated the previous seven years of production during which time over a thousand 350i-model TVRs were manufactured. The limited production 350SE was seen as the ultimate progression of the 350i in terms of both outright performance and enjoyment.

All 350SEs featured a 3.9 litre NCK hotwire Rover V8 all-alloy engine, polished multi-spoke alloy wheels and Koni adjustable shock absorbers.

== Individual cars ==
Each car is uniquely numbered with its number surrounded in laurels in gold for future recognition on the side wings and rear. The cars also had 350SE decals on front spoiler, side sills and rear. TVR originally sold the 350SEs for £21,000. Number 13 was never made so there was a number 26 to make up the 25 cars. At least three examples (numbers 1, 12, and 19) no longer exist.

Car number	Exterior colour	Interior details	Additional information
1	Monza red	Cream and red interior	crashed and broken in 2010
2	Mica red
3	Blue	Grey interior
4	Blue Starfire Mica Blue	Magnolia interior
5	Red	Parchment interior
6	Ruby Mica	Magnolia interior	for sale in 2012 mileage: 37800 miles
7	Green
8	Burgundy metallic red	Grey leather
9	Rosso Red	Grey leather	for sale in 2013, price: £5000, many upgrades
10	Red	Cream leather
11	Green	Cream Leather
12	Mica Midnight Blue	Magnolia half hide	Chassis, engine, and other components used to create a Sebring Austin-Healey 3000 replica in 2012-2014; body disposed of.
14	Midnight Blue
15	Black	Cream interior
16	Red
17	Green
18	Mica Blue	Magnolia full hide
19	Blue		broken
20	Grey	Grey	The only example fitted with the big-valve engine. For sale in 2014, mileage:69000 miles
21	Cooper Green	Magnolia interior
22	Sapphire Blue	Magnolia interior
23	Black	Magnolia interior
24	Midnight Blue	Magnolia interior
26	Monza Red	Black interior with red piping
