= TVR 450 SEAC =

1988 sports car

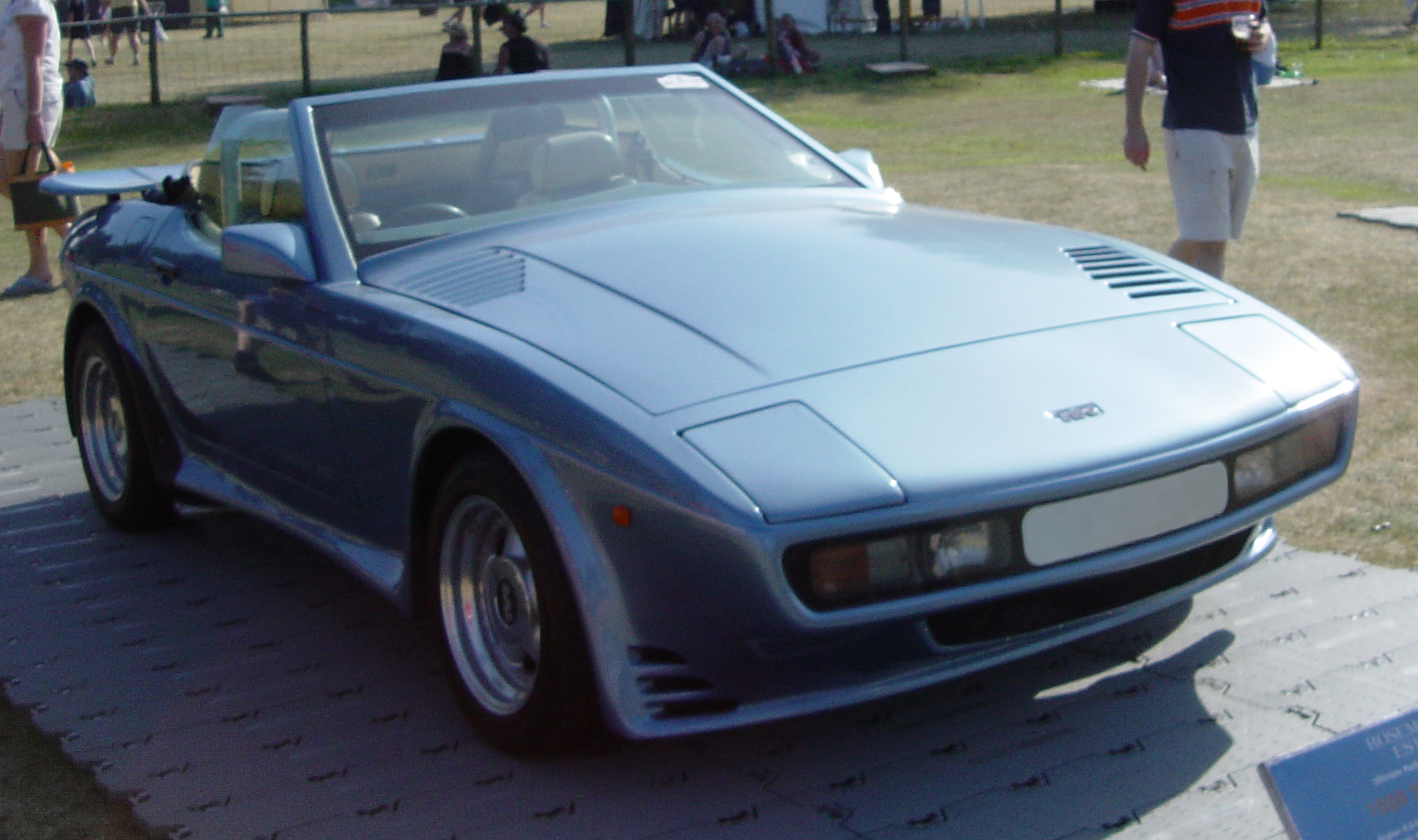

Overview
- Manufacturer: TVR
- Production: 1988 - 1989; 18 produced

Body and chassis
- Class: Sports car
- Body style: 2-door drophead
- Layout: FR layout
- Platform: TVR Wedge

Powertrain
- Engine: TVR Power Rover V8

Chronology
- Predecessor: TVR 420 SEAC

The TVR 450 SEAC is a sports car designed and built by TVR in a one-year only run. It used the same body style as the 420 SEAC but was fibreglass compared with the Aramid Composite (Glassfibre and Kevlar) body of the 420 and the same chassis. The only difference was the engine which grew to 4,5 litres and about 325 bhp (242 kW) and 435 Nm torque. As a consequence though the 450 SEAC was even more expensive to build and buy than the already expensive 420 SEAC, so about 17 were made.

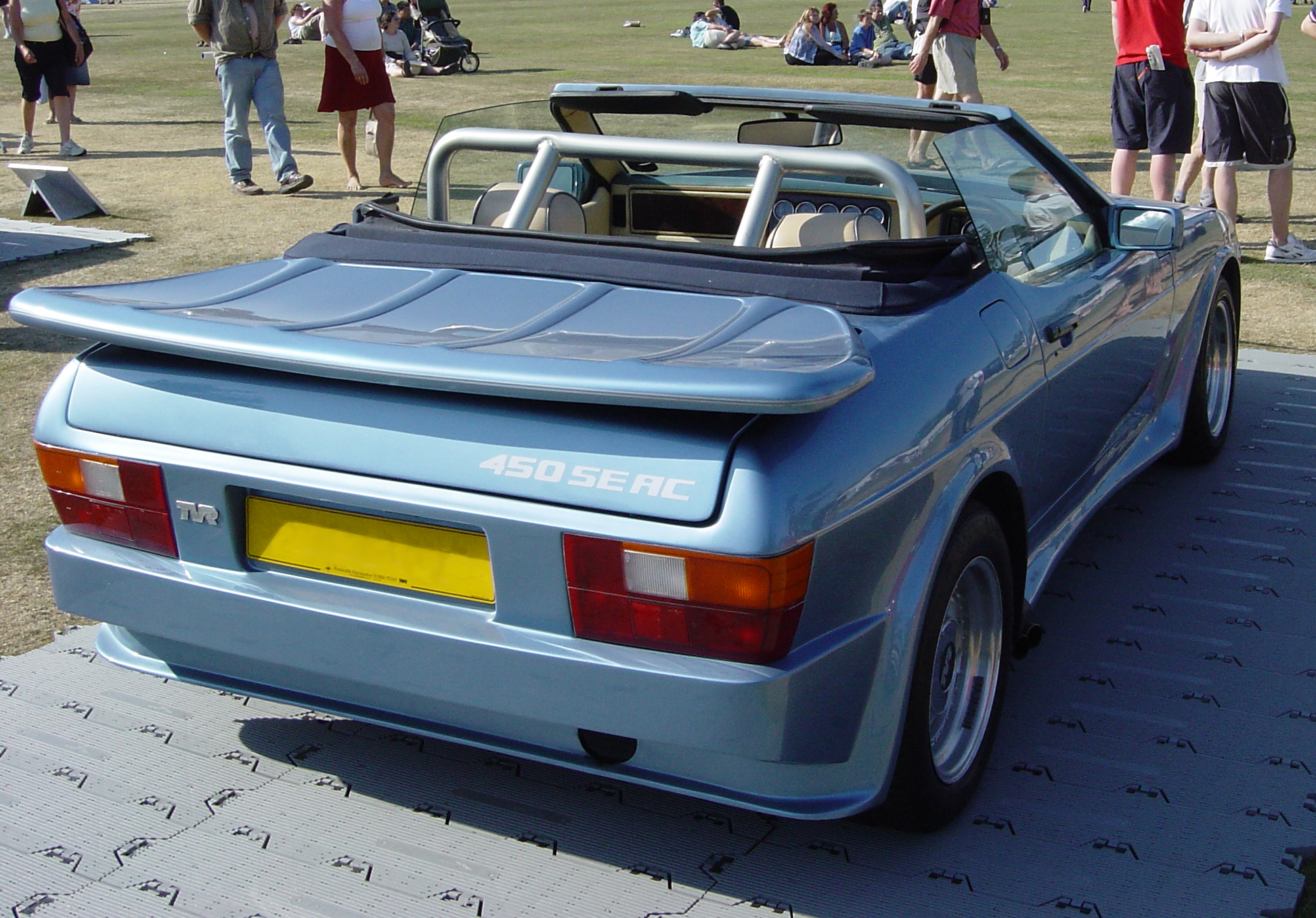
TVR 450 SEAC

== Specifications ==
Engine

- Engine: TVR Power Rover V8
- Engine capacity: 4441 cc (4.4L)
- Power Output: 325 bhp (242 kW)
- Torque Output: 320 lb⋅ft (434 N⋅m)

Transmission

- Transmission: five speed gearbox (Borg Warner T5)

Chassis/Body

- Chassis: Tubular spaceframe
- Body: Fibreglass reinforced with kevlar one piece body

Performance

- Acceleration 0-60 mph (97 km/h) : 4,5 seconds
- Top speed: 175 mph (282 km/h)
