= TVR 420 SEAC =

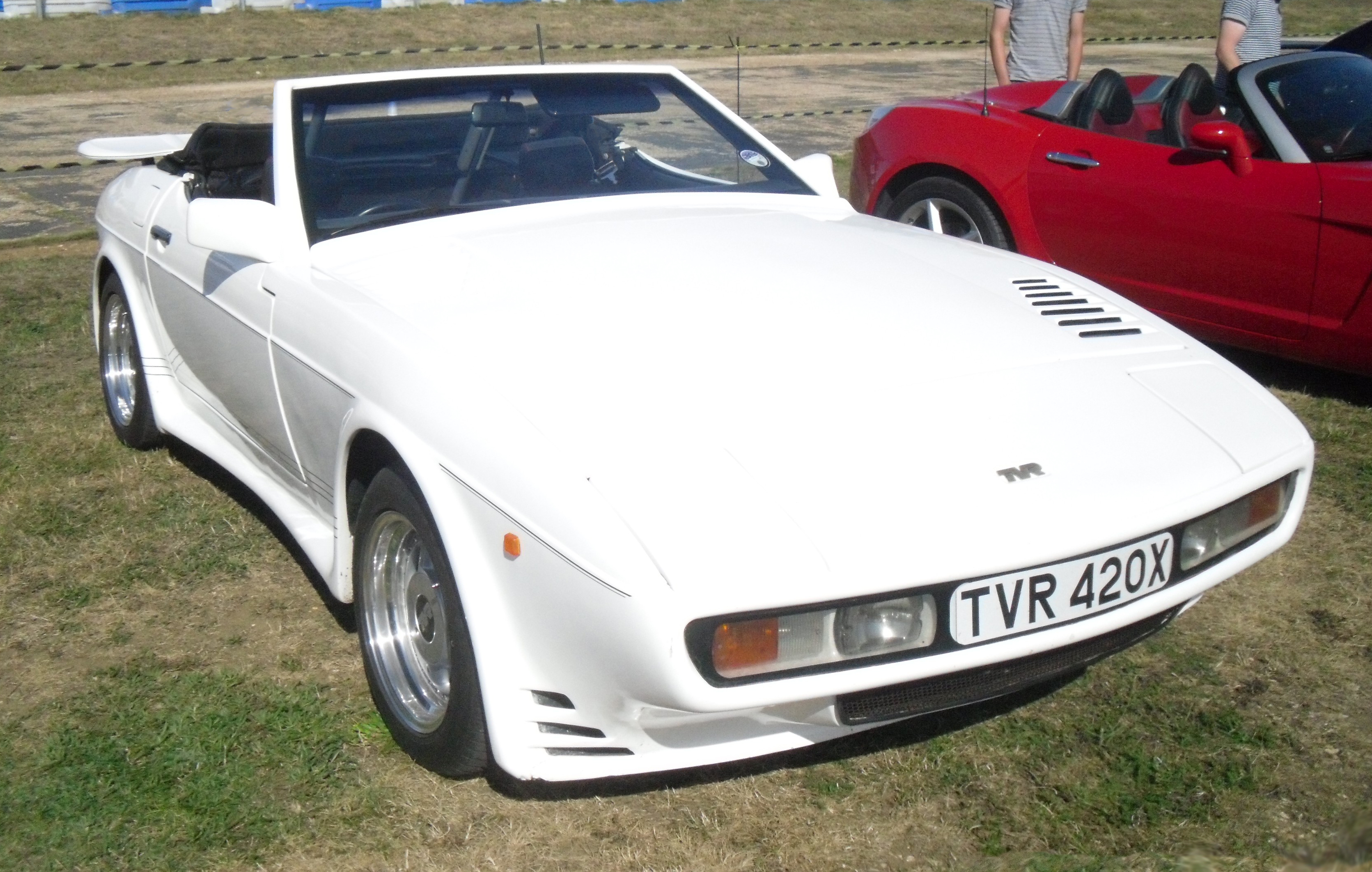

Overview
- Manufacturer: TVR
- Production: 1986–1988; 37 produced
- Assembly: United Kingdom: Blackpool, England

Body and chassis
- Class: Sports car
- Body style: 2 - door drophead
- Layout: FR layout
- Platform: TVR Wedges
- Related: TVR 350i

Powertrain
- Engine: TVR Power Rover V8

The TVR 420 SEAC is a sports car designed and built by TVR between 1986 and 1988. It is considered as the ultimate "wedge" TVR and is the top of the TVR Tasmin "wedge" family. The SEAC models can be distinguished by the large rear spoiler and the rounder nose.

The 420 SEAC was developed as a race car by TVR Competition Manager, Chris Schirle. Chris used his F1 experience to develop the Tasmin for competition use, achieving pole position in its first three outings at Oulton Park, Donington and Cadwell and seeing great success in the 1986/87 season winning 21 out of 24 races. At the end of the 1987 season, the SEAC was banned on grounds of homologation (not building the 200 cars required).

The acronym SEAC stands for Special Equipment Aramid Composite, which means that more than 20% of the body was kevlar unlike the other wedges, which used full fibreglass construction. The use of kevlar made the car more than 100 kg (220 lb) lighter without compromising the body rigidity. Due to problems with the finish and stiffness of the kevlar panels only the first 8-10 cars were manufactured with full kevlar bodies, the remainder had standard GRP bodies, except for the last 4 or 5 420 SEACs which had carbon fibre & glass fibre bodies. SEAC bodies were shorter and wider than the other wedges.

Other differences between the SEACs and the 350i/390SE/400SE wedge line include: a different chassis with a narrower transmission tunnel (1 or 2 were built with stainless steel chassis); the handbrake being changed to an umbrella type handle under the dash; a flat, 4 gauge dashboard; the exhaust system having twin pipes routed under the rear differential rather than a single pipe routed above it.

The use of kevlar and the highly tuned Rover V8 engine made the car extremely quick but had its effect on price, which was twice as much as a standard 350i. By 1988, when the even more powerful 450 SEAC replaced the 420 SEAC, 37 road going 420 SEACs had been built.

== Specifications ==
Engine

- Engine: TVR power ASHIK V8
- Engine capacity: 4228 cc (4.2 L)
- Power output: 300 bhp (224 kW; 304 PS)
- Torque output: 290 lb⋅ft (393 N⋅m)

Transmission

- Transmission: Rover LT77 5-speed

Chassis/Body

- Chassis: Tubular spaceframe
- Body: One piece made in: Kevlar; glass fibre and Kevlar; or carbon fibre and glass fibre

Performance

- Acceleration 0-60 mph (97 km/h): 4,7 Seconds
- Top speed: 165 mph (266 km/h)
