= TVR Tasmin =

TVR Tasmin TVR 280i
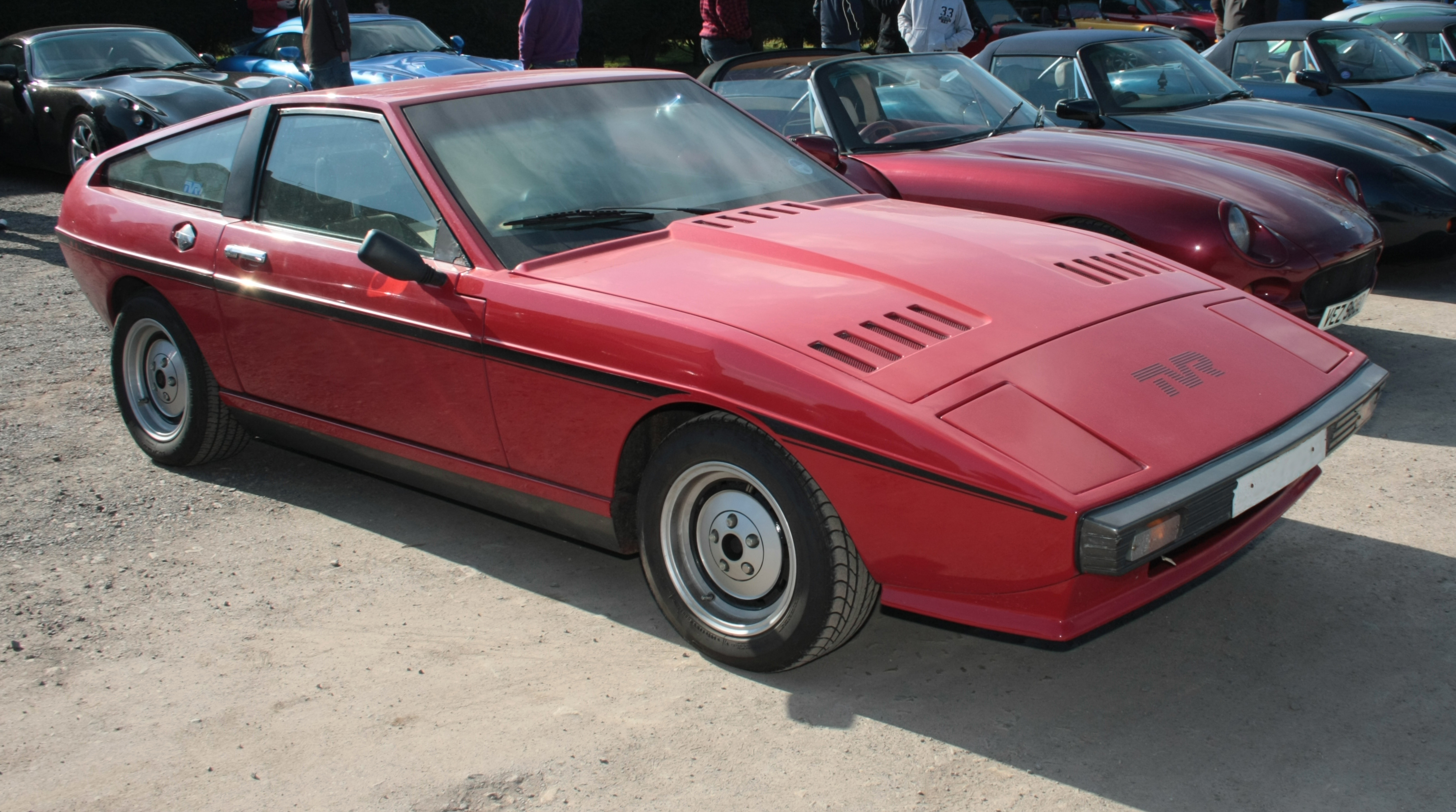

Overview
- Manufacturer: TVR
- Production: Tasmin: 1980–1984 (61 produced); 280i: 1984–1987 (980 produced)
- Assembly: United Kingdom: Blackpool, England
- Designer: Oliver Winterbottom

Body and chassis
- Class: Sports car
- Body style: 2-door coupé 2-door convertible
- Layout: FR layout
- Platform: TVR Wedges

Powertrain
- Engine: 2.0 L Ford Pinto TL20 I4; 2.8 L Ford Cologne V6
- Transmission: 4/5-speed manual 3-speed automatic

Chronology
- Predecessor: TVR 3000M/Taimar
- Successor: TVR 350i

The TVR Tasmin (later known as the TVR 280i) is a sports car designed by Oliver Winterbottom (coach) and Ian Jones (chassis) for TVR and built in the United Kingdom by that company from 1980 to 1987. It was the first of TVR's "Wedge"-series which formed the basis of its 1980s model range. The Tasmin/280i was available as a 2-seater coupé, as a 2+2 coupé and as a 2-seater convertible.

== History ==
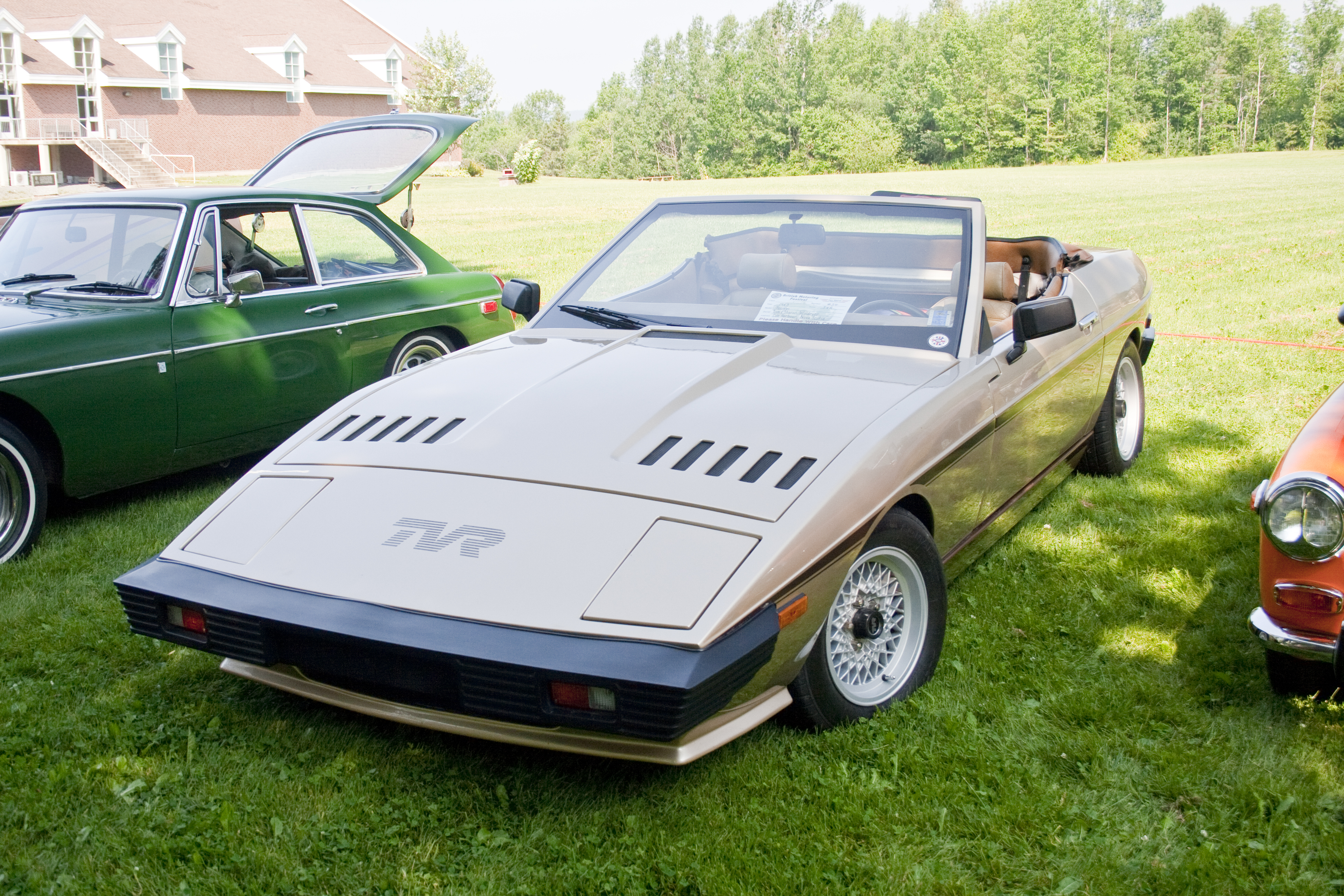
TVR Tasmin Convertible

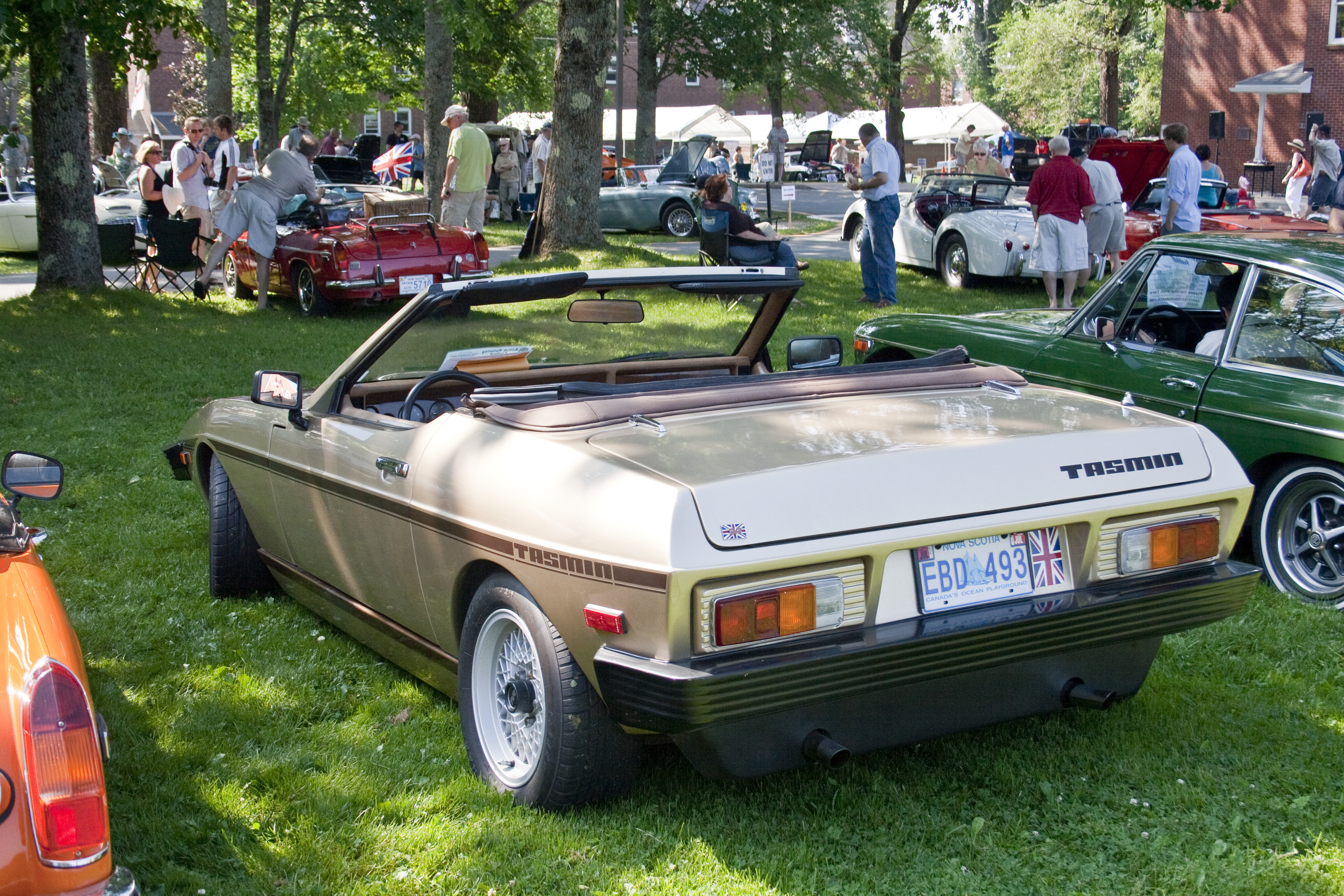
TVR Tasmin Convertible

As with all TVRs, the running gear was located in a tubular spaceframe steel chassis, which was powder coated for extra corrosion resistance. Much of the running gear was sourced from Fords of the period. The suspension and steering was sourced from the Ford Cortina, with TVR engineered trailing arms at the rear, similar to designs previously used on Lotus models including the early Esprit. Gearboxes were from the Cortina, Granada, and Sierra. Brakes were discs all round, with the front units from the Granada. The differential (and rear brakes) was from the Jaguar XJ-S. Ancillary components were sourced from a variety of mainstream manufacturers, so it is possible to identify, for example, Ford Cortina external door handles; Triumph TR7 or Austin Metro internal handles; front side/indicator lamps by Lucas with those on later models taken from the Renault 12 and the Peugeot 505; rear lamp clusters from the Ford Capri, Rover SD1 or the Renault Fuego; boot lid hinges from the Hillman Imp and ex-Jaguar ashtrays (or on later cars the ashtray from the DeLorean DMC-12). The radiator was taken variously from the Ford Granada Mk2 and the Range Rover; front brakes could be ex-Granada in solid- or vented-disc form or the 4-piston calipers from the BL Princess (also a 'wedge' shaped car). The steering column and its associated switchgear changed over the years too: starting with the TR7 and proceeding through the Rover SD1, very late cars used the installation from the Ford Granada Mk3. The handbrake mechanism was that used on the Lotus Esprit. The headlamp pods were powered by individual motors lifted from the TR7/ Esprit. The Tasmin also featured a bonded windscreen and incorporated the aerial in the rear screen heater element. The original wheel design was specific to the Tasmin, being produced by Telcast in Telford. Later cars sported wheels from various makers including OZ. The seats were made by Callow & Maddox Brothers in Coventry, who also supplied other British carmakers, hence the Tasmin seats appear similar to those used elsewhere but are in fact vehicle-specific, having a narrow but long base bolster.

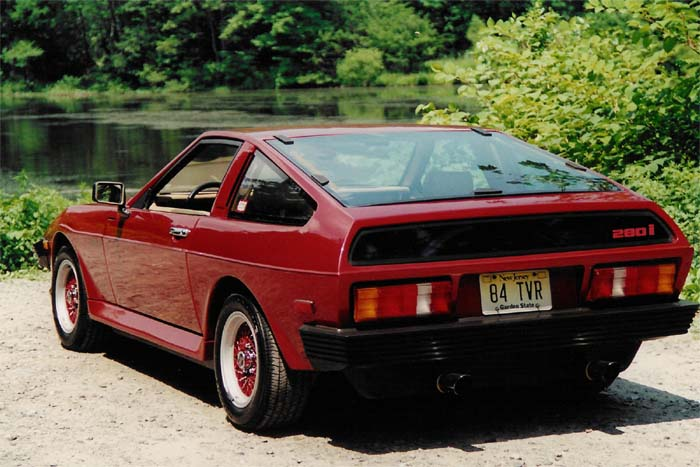
TVR 280i coupé (US spec)

The engine was the Ford 2.8 Cologne V6 with Bosch fuel injection producing 160 bhp (119 kW; 162 PS). An automatic gearbox was available, making it the first TVR to have this as an option. While the styling of the car was by Oliver Winterbottom who had previously styled the Lotus Elite S2. The 2.8-litre "Cologne" V6 had already been certified for US sales, and thus TVR returned to the US market after a six-year hiatus. The Tasmin was the last TVR to be exported to the United States, with the last car brought over in 1987, this being a series II 280i. A number of reasons are cited for TVR's withdrawal from the US. These allegedly include a deteriorating relationship with the import agents and the distribution network, warranty problems and liability insurance premiums rising from $160K to over $1M.

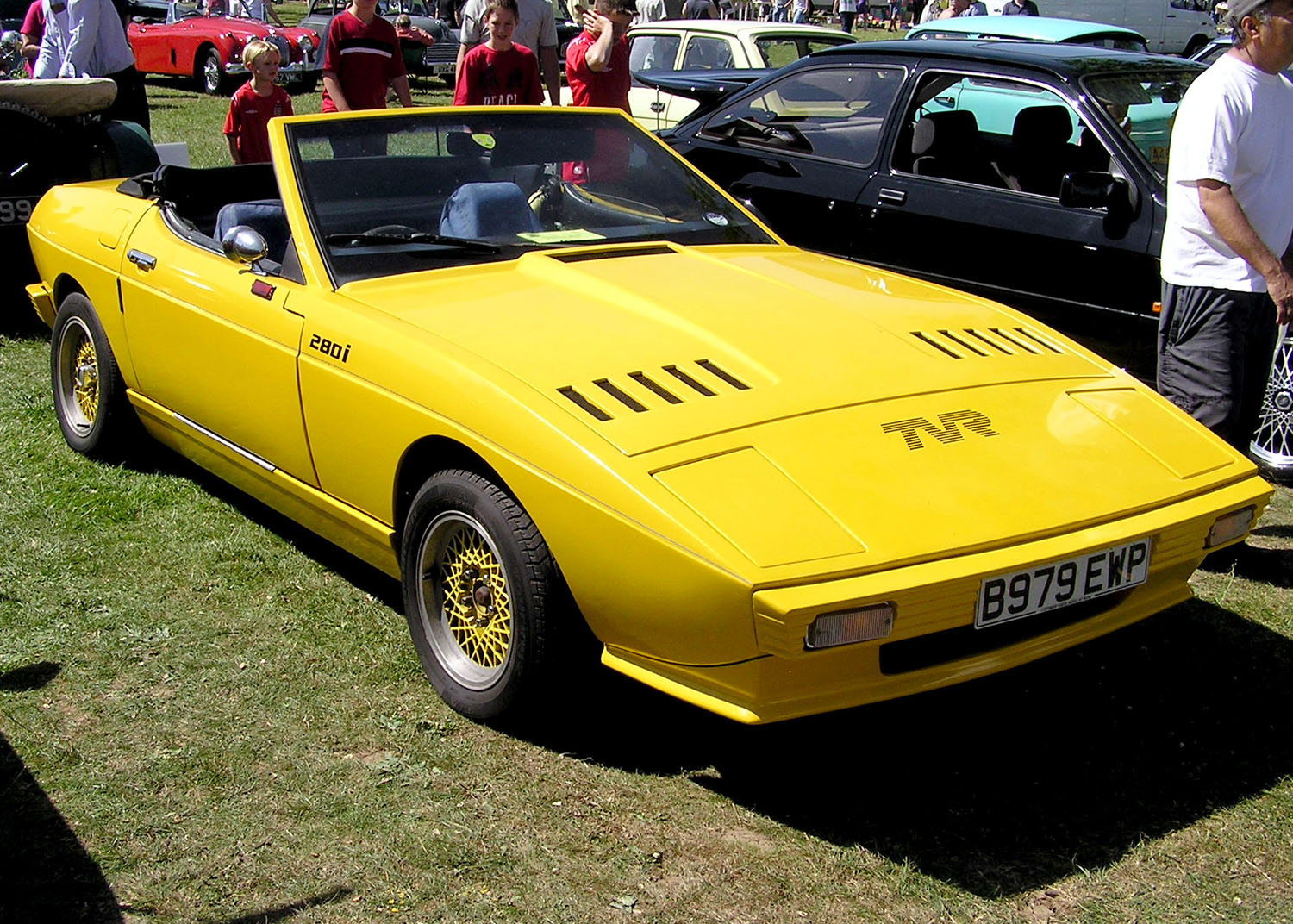
Series II TVR 280i Convertible

In 1981, a series II car appeared, incorporating various improvements or modifications to the series I. These included a front suspension redesign, returning the tie-rods to the tension mode used by Ford rather than the compression mode into which TVR had initially installed them. This addressed frequent complaints of bump-steer. A bodyshell restyle also altered the proportions of the car (largely by adding 3 inches to the length aft of the rear axle and tilting the previously vertical glass tail panel) so it appeared shorter in the nose and longer at the rear; this coincided with the launch of the convertible/drophead version, which did not feature the lengthened body. In 1984, the Tasmin name was dropped, and the car was renamed TVR 280i, although the name remained in use within the TVR factory. Early 350i's were also referred to as the "Tasmin 350i". TVR's consistently inconsistent badging policy resulted in the cars appearing as Tasmins, Tasmin 280is or just plain 280is as the Tasmin name was dropped.

The Tasmin did not start out very strongly, with TVR production reaching a low of 121 in 1982. By 1985, yearly production had increased to 472. In total, 1,167 V6 cars were produced.

== Tasmin 200 ==
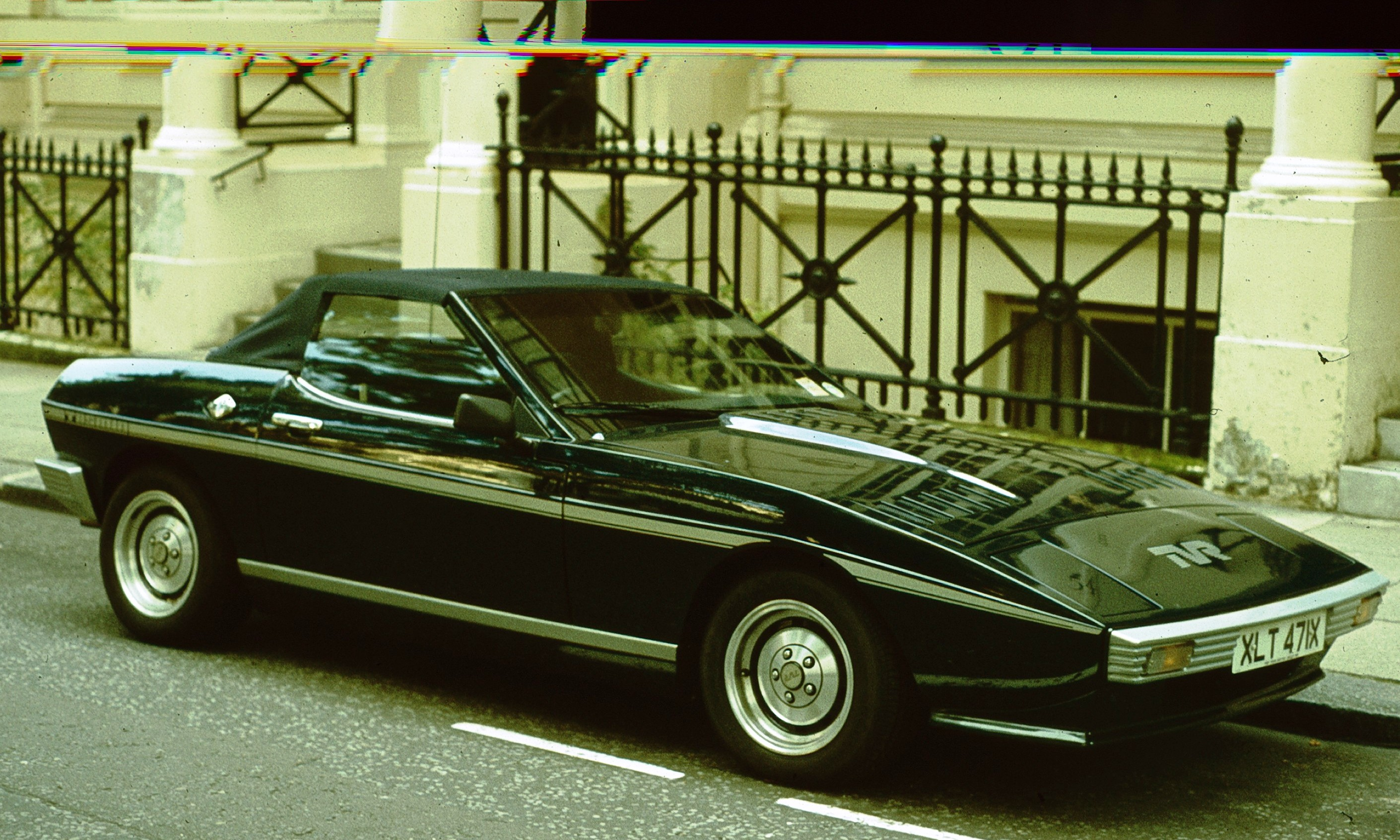
TVR Tasmin 200

Beside the Cologne V6 engine, the Tasmin was also available with a 2.0 litre Ford Pinto engine. This car, presented in late 1981, was called the Tasmin 200 and was an attempt to make a car cheaper than the standard Tasmin 280i. The Tasmin 200 coupe retained the Series I bodyshell. It was priced at under £10,000, but with an engine producing only about 100 bhp (75 kW; 101 PS) it wasn't a big success. Only 16 Tasmin 200 coupes and 45 convertibles were made in total.

== Specifications ==
Engine

Tasmin 280i

- Engine: Ford Cologne V6
- Engine capacity: 2792 cc (2.8 L)
- Power output: 160 bhp (119 kW; 162 PS) (Series 1), 150 bhp (112 kW; 152 PS) (series II)
- Torque output: 162 lb⋅ft (220 N⋅m)

Tasmin 200

- Engine: Ford Pinto TL20 straight-four
- Engine capacity: 1993 cc (2.0 L)
- Power output: 101 bhp (75 kW; 102 PS)
- Torque output: 112 lb⋅ft (152 N⋅m)

Transmission

- Transmission: 4-speed Ford manual gearbox, 5-speed Ford manual gearbox, 3-speed Ford automatic gearbox

Suspension

- Front: Double Wishbones
- Rear: Semi trailing arms

Brakes

- Front: Disc brakes
- Rear: Disc brakes

Chassis/Body

- Chassis: Tubular spaceframe steel chassis
- Body: Fibreglass body panels

Weight

Tasmin 280i

- Weight: 1,074 kg (2,368 lb)

Tasmin 200

- Weight: 971 kg (2,141 lb)

Performance

Tasmin 280i

- Acceleration 0-60 mph (97 km/h): 8.0 seconds, 8.2 seconds (automatic gearbox)
- Top speed: 130 mph (209 km/h) (Series 1), 128 mph (206 km/h)

Tasmin 200

- Acceleration 0-60 mph (97 km/h) : 9.0 seconds
- Top speed: 110 mph (177 km/h)
