= Zante (disambiguation) =

Zante is an alternative name of the Greek island of Zakynthos.

Zante may also refer to

in Latvia

- Zante Manor, a manor house
- Zante parish

in the United States

- Zante, California
- Zante Plantation, a plantation in South Carolina

Other

- Zante currant
- Zante, a concept car built by TVR in 1972
