= List of places in California (Z) =

List of places in California - Z

This list of current:

- cities
- towns, unincorporated communities
- counties, and other recognized places in the U.S. state of California.

Information on the number and names of counties in which the place lies, and its lower and upper ZIP Code bounds, if applicable are also included.

Name of place	Number of counties	Principal county	Lower zip code	Upper zip code
Zamora	1	Yolo County	95698	
Zante	1	Tulare County	93257	
Zayante	1	Santa Cruz County		
Zediker	1	Fresno County		
Zee Estates	1	El Dorado		
Zenia	1	Trinity County	95595	
Zinfandel	1	Napa County		
Zurich	1	Inyo County		
Zuver	1	Placer County		
Zzyzx	1	San Bernardino County	92309	
