= Nikolay Smolensky =

Businessman

Nikolay Smolenski
- Born: Nikolay Alexandrovich Smolenski; June 11, 1980 (age 46)
- Father: Alexander Smolensky

Nikolay Alexandrovich Smolenski (Russian: Никола́й Алекса́ндрович Смоле́нский, also written as Nikolai Smolenski), born 11 June 1980, is a businessman.

Nikolai studied in Austria and the United Kingdom. He has Greek citizenship.

On 27 July 2004, Smolensky bought British carmaker TVR.

In June 2013, it was confirmed that Nikolai Smolenski had sold his entire ownership of TVR to a syndicate of British businessmen led by Les Edgar, a British entrepreneur.

Nikolai Smolenski was a board member of the International Private Bank AD (Skopje, Macedonia).
