= Zante Manor =

Manor house in Latvia

- Courland, Latvia
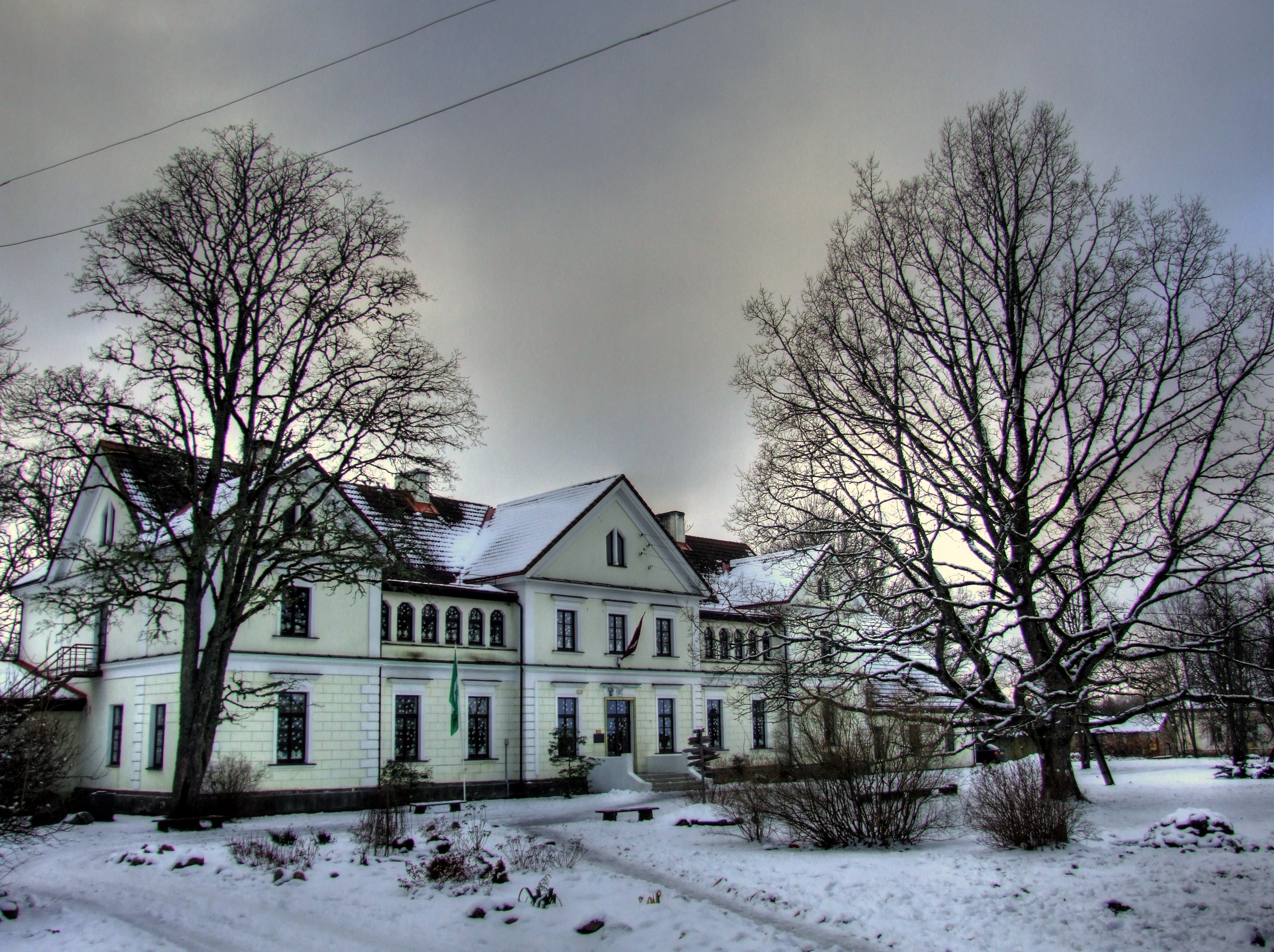

Site information
- Type: Manor

Location
- Coordinates: 56°50′09.4″N 22°43′55.3″E

Zante Manor (Latvian: Zantes muižas pils) is a manor house in Zante, Zante Parish, Tukums Municipality in the Courland region of Latvia. In 1925 it became a school building. From 1953 to 1963 the manor housed the Zante secondary school, but it now houses the Zante primary school.

== History ==
Zante Manor was a Knight's Manor in Zante Parish along with Mežmuiža Manor, and Maz-Zanti (Jaun-Zanti) estate. The name Zante is believed to have come from Herman von Zanten, who was probably the first ruler of the parish. Around 1500, Zante became the property of Herman von Butlar. Zante manor was divided before 1646. A part of the Vec-Zante, and later the Great-Zante (Latvian: Liel-Zante) belonged to Anna von Butlar, who was married to Heinrich von Corfu, the other part to the Jaun-Zanti or Maz-Zante, remaining in the hands of Gerhard von Butlar.

In 1667 the common ownership of Zante was completely abolished and two independent estates were created. For more than a hundred years, they have existed as separate estates with different owners, who have changed very often. Between 1667 and 1699, the owners of the Great Zante were: von Corf, von der Brinken, von Plettenberg, von Hans, von Brunow. Then, for 15 years, Liel-Zante was owned by von der Zaken. During this time the manor house with all the manor archives burnt down. The widow and children of Fromhold von Zaken, the owner of Zante, died of the plague in 1710, and the manor was sold to von Fittinghof in 1714. From 1717 the Great Zante belonged to the Brinken von Corf. In 1775, Christopher Friedrich von Firks bought Great-Zant and in 1777 also Maz-Zant and re-united the once divided property. From 1791 to 1881, Zante Manor was owned by von Medham, von Firks, von Raden, von Liven, von Derchau.

Zante manor house was built in the first half of 19th century in the neoclassical architectural style. The manor had many owners. In 1881 the manor was bought by August von Knigge. During his time the manor farm flourished. New stables, barns, rails were built. In 1900 the manor house had a windmill, a brick house, carp ponds, breeding horses, cattle and sheep. From 1906 to 1909, Zante was owned by Silvio Braderich, who sold it to the families of 44 German colonists and the rest to Baron Paul von Hahn from Aizupe. In 1912 Alfred von Lucau was the tenant of the Jaundziru Manor. During the agrarian reform in 1920 the manor was nationalized and divided into smaller new farms.

In 1925 the school was moved to the former manor house, where it is still located. From 1953 to 1963, the building housed Zante Secondary School and later - Zante Elementary School. The first official beginnings of Zante Elementary School date back to 1885, but various facts suggest that the school was established earlier. There is a park with imported trees plantation near the manor and a monument to the freeman August Knige and his wife Helene Koskula.

From the complex of the manor house there has been preserved the servants' dwelling house and hornbeam, (19th century), granary (19th century) and dairy buildings (1929).

== Legends ==
According to the local legend, there used to be Gates to the Hell at the manor because allegedly one of the landlords was "turned into black dogs by a two black ladies with white rags in front " and afterwards landlord was dragged from the Manor porch straight into Hell.

== See also ==
- List of palaces and manor houses in Latvia
