= Les Edgar =

Video game developer and automotive businessman

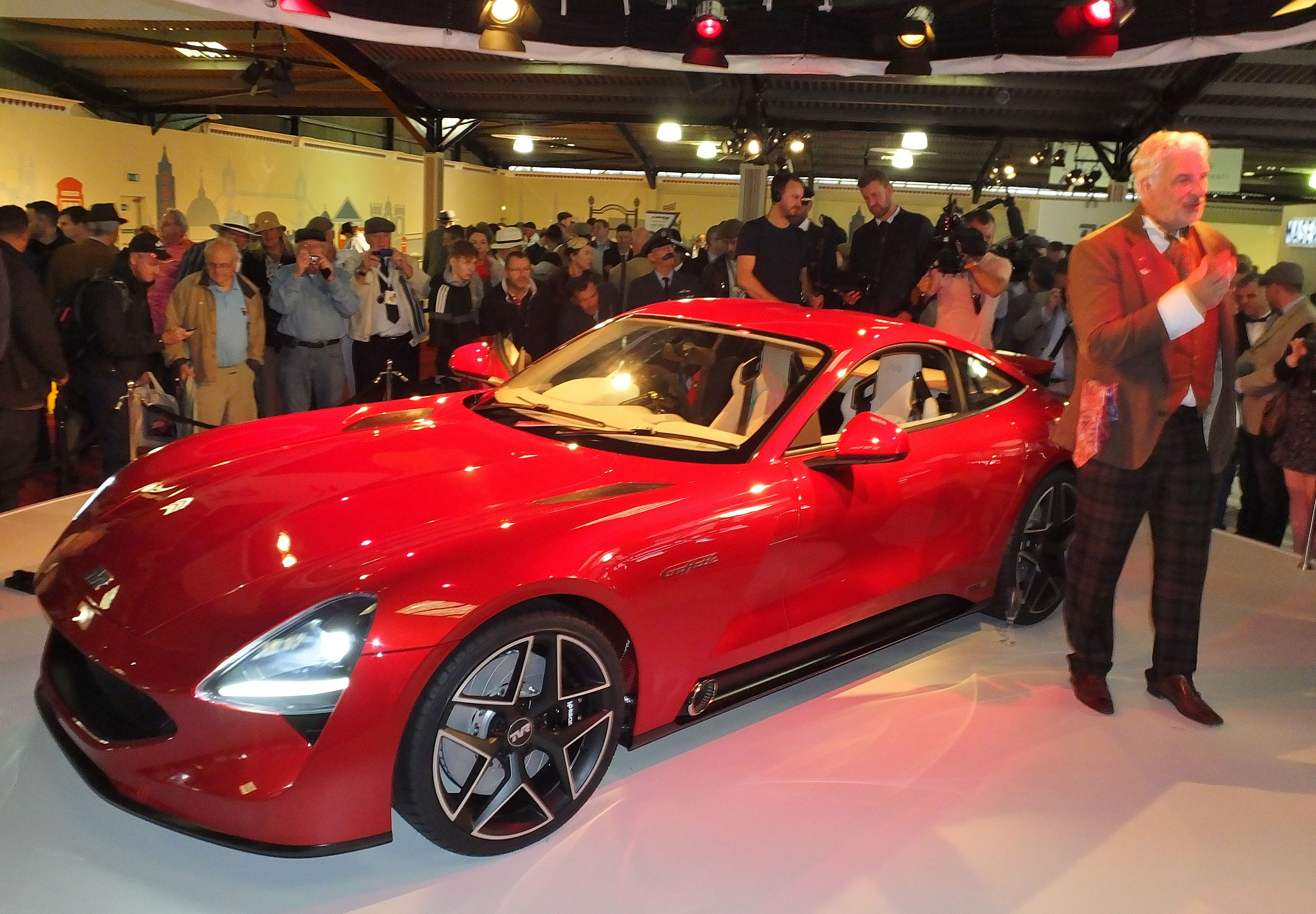
- Edgar unveiling the TVR Griffith at the 2017 Goodwood Revival
- Born: Leslie Hugh Edgar; May 1959 (age 67)
- Occupation: Video game developer (formerly) Automotive businessman
- Known for: Bullfrog Productions; TVR

Leslie Hugh Edgar (born May 1959) is an entrepreneur, known for being the co-founder and joint managing director of Bullfrog Productions, which he set up with Peter Molyneux. After Bullfrog's acquisition by Electronic Arts in 1995, Edgar became a vice president there. Edgar left Bullfrog in 1999, and eventually left the video gaming industry for the automotive industry, where he reintroduced Aston Martin to racing, and became chairman of TVR, which has, under his leadership, set up partnerships with Gordon Murray and Cosworth. Edgar has stated that he intends to return TVR to Le Mans 24 Hours.

== Career ==
=== Video game industry ===
In 1982, Edgar was working at a Hifi shop called PJ Hi-Fi, which Peter Molyneux entered one day seeking a computer for a database program he had been writing. This meeting led to the two men forming a partnership: Edgar stated that they had a similar sense of humour, and shared many interests including a desire to succeed. He also said that retail was lacking challenge. Edgar and Molyneux then formed Taurus Impact Systems (named so because both Molyneux and Edgar were Taureans), to develop database software. Commodore Europe contacted Taurus, mistaking it for a similarly named one called Torus. As a result, Taurus received several Amiga machines, with which Edgar and Molyneux created a database program called Acquisition, which Edgar later stated was "a disaster" due to the market being confused over the meaning of the name. The pair called their future as software developers into question when they spent their money fixing bugs and updating the manual, but Edgar then had the idea of writing games. A friend of Molyneux's asked him to convert Druid II: Enlightenment to the Amiga, and he and Edgar exaggerated their abilities. According to Edgar, it was during the conversion that they learnt to move sprites, and developed a routine for animation. Afterwards, they were running out of money, and Edgar suggested they shut Taurus down, but Molyneux had the idea of Populous. When the game was released, it was under a new brand: Bullfrog. Edgar had difficulty locating a publisher for Populous (the genre was "misunderstood by everyone"), and even approached The Lego Group but they did not like the idea. The game was eventually published by Electronic Arts.

According to Edgar, Bullfrog was set up in preparation for when Acquisition became unimportant and they could focus on game development. The Bullfrog brand was set up in 1987, and was named after a ceramic ornament in the office. Edgar contributed many ideas to Populous, and was responsible for Bullfrog's administrative work. Both Molyneux and Edgar were managing directors. Another role Edgar had at Bullfrog was motivating people. Edgar is credited for management roles in Theme Park and Dungeon Keeper. Edgar licensed Populous for platforms including the Super Nintendo Entertainment System (SNES) and Sega Mega Drive to developers such as Imagineer (who developed the SNES version), which led to the game becoming popular in Japan.

In 1993, Bullfrog were in discussion with Electronic Arts about a merger. Edgar suggested to talk with other companies such as Sony and Virgin. Electronic Arts was chosen due to their connection with Bullfrog, and the merger was signed in early 1995. Edgar then became a vice president of Electronic Arts' European Studios and Bullfrog's chairman. He stated that the change was "very big", and worked for Electronic Arts to assist the transition. He built a campus facility to allow Bullfrog employees to merge with Electronic Arts, and left soon afterwards.

During the development for the cancelled Creation, Edgar and his Bullfrog colleagues Guy Simmons and Glenn Corpes travelled to Loch Ness for research. For Theme Aquarium, Edgar wondered about the possibility of having a game designed in the United Kingdom and implemented in Japan. He stated that a group was set up in Bullfrog to do it. In mid-1999, Edgar left Bullfrog. Shortly after his departure, Edge magazine described him as "one of the industry's biggest players". He helped set up Lost Toys, to whom he provided financial support. Edgar stated that his favourite Bullfrog game is Theme Park.

According to The Guardian, it was generally acknowledged by 2014 that Edgar had "long since" left the video gaming industry.

=== Automotive industry ===
In the early 2000s, Edgar played a major role in returning Aston Martin to endurance racing. He stated that he is a "big fan" of Aston Martin, and has owned a 600N Vantage. He was still involved with the gaming industry in the 2000s, at one point being a non-executive director at Kuju Entertainment, and was described by Computer and Video Games as a "high-powered games consultant". In June 2013, Edgar was in charge of TVR Automotive Ltd. and purchased TVR from Nikolai Smolenski, and became its chairman. On the purchase, Edgar explained that Smolenski was uninterested at first, but one day someone yelled "you killed TVR!" to him. Edgar then suggested the repatriation of the brand to the United Kingdom, and explained that the transaction was "bizarrely straightforward". When asked about his choice of brand in an interview with the BBC's Top Gear magazine, Edgar said that he liked sports cars in-between an Aston Martin and a Lotus in luxury, and TVR cars "fit that bill perfectly". Edgar also revealed that he would like to return TVR to Le Mans 24 Hours.

Edgar believed that TVR had a "credibility gap", which led to the hiring of Gordon Murray and Cosworth. Talking about the deal, Edgar said that Murray was "a God", but knew TVR could not afford his services. It was when Edgar revealed his intention to go to Le Mans that a deal was reached. Edgar's original intention was to construct a few cars to race in a special series.

The deal with Murray was struck in June 2015. Edgar described Murray and Cosworth as "perfect partners", and said that they were "incredibly excited and motivated". In March 2016, TVR launched a factory in Ebbw Vale, Wales, which Edgar stated was "a fantastic opportunity both for TVR and the Welsh Government".

On 10 July 2017, Edgar revealed the TVR Griffith, which uses a 5-litre Cosworth V8, and is reported to weight less than 1,250 kg (2,756 lb). It debuted in September 2017 at the Goodwood Revival.
