= Trevor Wilkinson (engineer) =

British automotive engineer and founder of TVR (1923–2008)

- Born: 14 May 1923; Blackpool, England
- Died: 6 June 2008 (aged 85); Minorca, Spain
- Occupation: Automotive engineer
- Known for: Founder of TVR

Trevor Wilkinson (14 May 1923 – 6 June 2008) was a British automotive engineer and founder of sports car manufacturer TVR.

== Early life ==
Wilkinson was born in Blackpool, England. He left school without qualifications in 1937 and began an apprenticeship at a local garage, gaining practical mechanical skills. After the Second World War, he established Trevcar Motors and converted an Alvis Firebird into a racing car.

== Founding of TVR ==
In 1948, Wilkinson co-founded TVR Engineering (later TVR) with Jack Pickard. The company name was derived from a shortened version of his first name, “TreVoR.” Their first car, TVR1, featured a tubular steel chassis and mechanical components sourced from other vehicles, including parts from a dodgem car.

By the late 1950s, Wilkinson developed a formula that combined a lightweight tubular chassis with fiberglass bodywork and a mixture of components from larger British manufacturers. The resulting TVR Grantura, introduced in 1958, became the foundation for TVR models over the next two decades. Due to a tax loophole, early TVRs were also available as kits, making them attractive to amateur racers. Wilkinson stepped back from daily operations in 1962, and the company was sold in 1965.

== Later developments and legacy ==
After leaving TVR, Wilkinson ran Grantura Plastics, a glassfibre business supplying the motor industry. TVR continued to grow under later owners, gaining attention among American sports car fans with high-performance cars such as the TVR Griffith, TVR Cerbera and TVR Sagaris. Wilkinson stayed in touch with the marque through enthusiast clubs and attending gatherings organised by the TVR Car Club of North America.

== Later life and death ==
Wilkinson retired to Minorca, Spain in the 1980s, where he lived quietly spending time on his small yacht. Wilkinson died there on 6 June 2008 at the age of 85. His wife predeceased him and he was survived by a sister.
