= TVR S series =

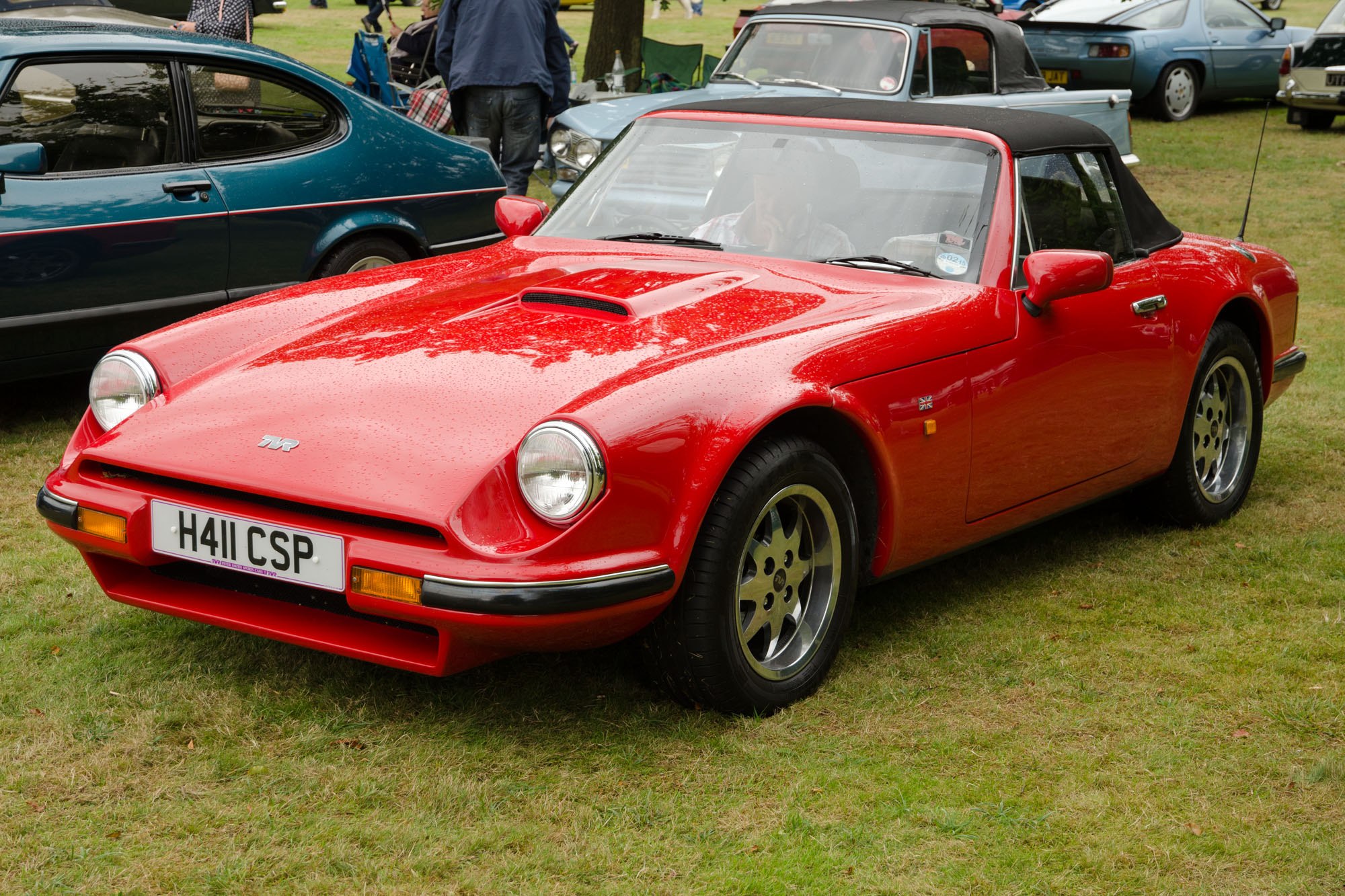
- 1991 TVR S3

Overview
- Manufacturer: TVR
- Production: 1987–1994
- Assembly: United Kingdom: Blackpool, England

Body and chassis
- Layout: Front-engine, rear-wheel-drive

Powertrain
- Engine: 2.8-L V6 160 bhp (S1); 2.9-L V6 168 bhp (S2-S4); 2.0 V8 240 bhp (V8S; Italy); 3.9 V8 250 bhp (V8S)

Dimensions
- Wheelbase: 2,286 mm (90.0 in)
- Length: 3,958 mm (155.8 in)
- Width: 1,665 mm (65.6 in)
- Height: 1,223 mm (48.1 in)
- Kerb weight: 940–1,054 kg (2,072–2,324 lb) (V6/V8)

The TVR S series is a line of sports cars manufactured by the British company TVR between 1986 and 1994. It was announced at the 1986 British International Motor Show. The car went into production in less than 12 months, with 150 pre-manufacture orders placed at the motor show before the moulds were even made.

This was Peter Wheeler's first major development since buying the company from Martin Lilley, and the turning point in TVR's fortunes. In total, TVR produced 2,604 S-series cars; 410 of these were the V8S model. The design was the return to a more traditional style, with a strong resemblance to the 1970s M series.

== S1/S2/S3(C)/S4C ==
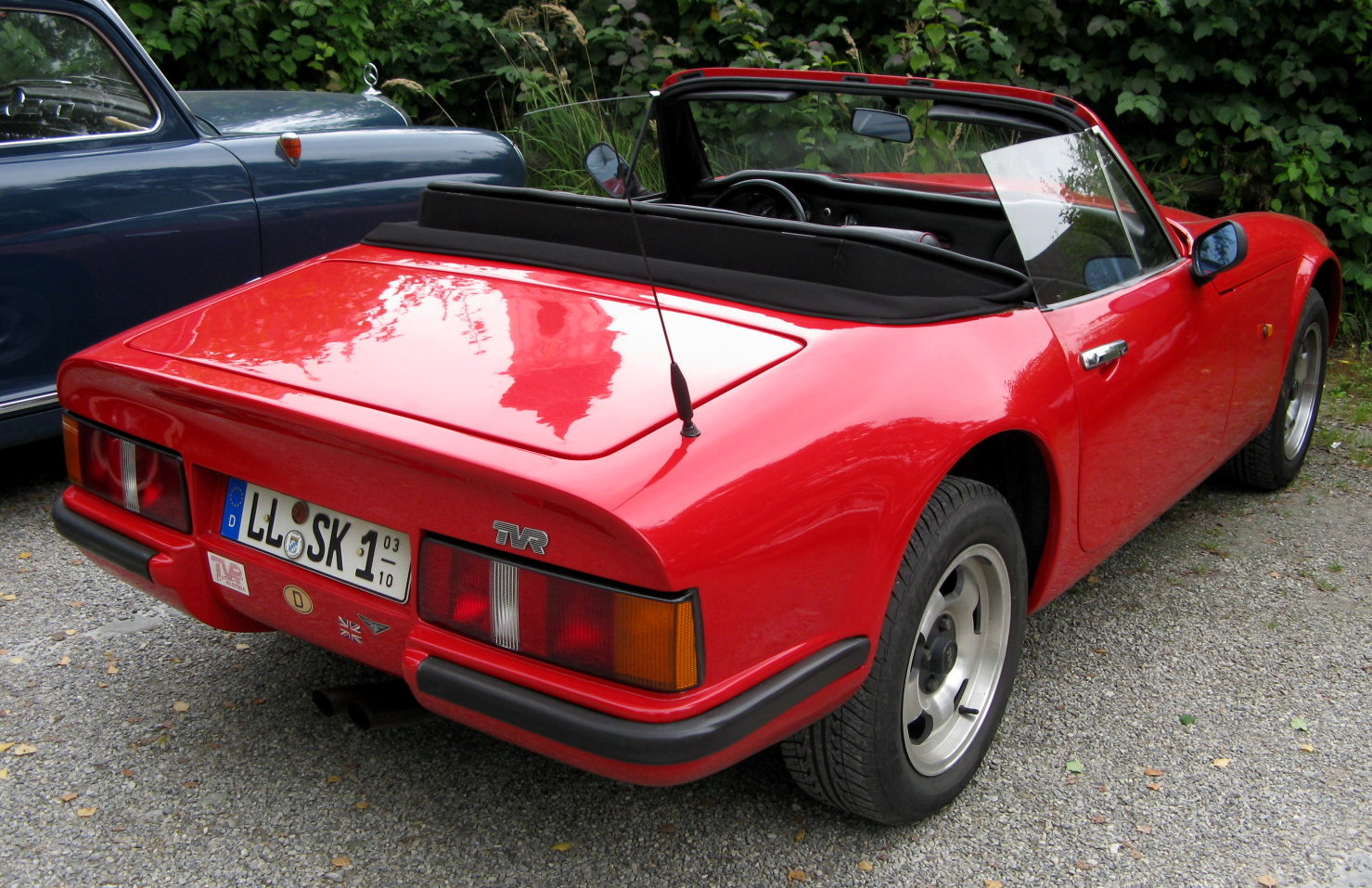
1988 TVR S

The V6 S-series cars used Ford's Cologne V6 in 2.8 L, 160 bhp (119 kW; 162 PS) (S1) and 2.9 L (2933cc), 168 bhp (125 kW; 170 PS) (S2–S4) forms. Deliveries of S started in September 1987 and early "S" cars are often referred to as "S1", to distinguish them from later versions.

The S2 was launched in 1988 introducing the 2.9-L engine. The S3 followed in 1989 with longer doors, although some late S2 cars also had these. The S3 also introduced a more traditional design of dashboard with burr walnut veneer.

S1s are becoming increasingly rare with only 78 licensed and 224 SORN.

Model names ending with "c" were used to denote vehicles fitted with a catalytic converter. Only the S3 and S4 were available with catalysts (and the S4 was not built without them). A catalytic converter standard in the UK was introduced in August 1992, at "K" registration; earlier catalysed cars were for export to markets with tighter emissions standards.

== V8S (1991–1994) ==
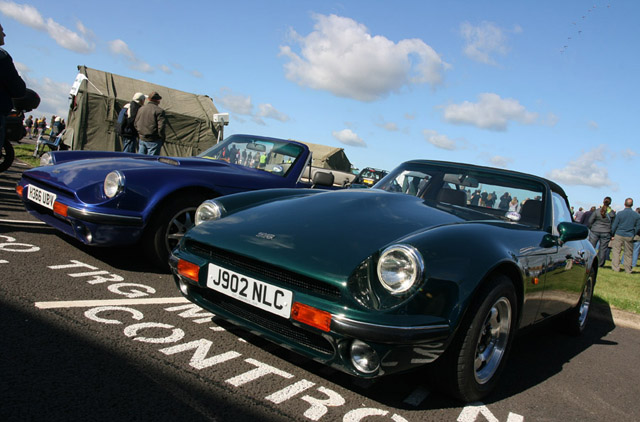
TVR S3 on left, V8S on right, showcasing the two different types of bonnets used

TVR S 290 interior (1990)

The V8S was launched in 1991 standard specification of the V8S included half-hide leather interior, walnut trim, mohair hood, OZ alloy wheels, driving lamps, electric windows and door mirrors.

The V8S contains a 4.0 L fuel-injected Rover V8 engine, with gas-flowed cylinder heads, higher lift camshaft, compression ratio upped to 10:5:1, revised manifold, new chip for the engine management system and a limited slip differential. The result is 240 bhp (180 kW) at 5250 rpm and 270 lb⋅ft (366 N⋅m) of torque at 3000 rpm.

The V8S has a number of cosmetic differences over the V6. The bonnet has a large hump - created to house the Italian specification supercharger but carried over to all V8S models.

The V8S has a small vent facing the windscreen, whereas S1 to S3 models face forward. Very late S3 and S4 models had no hump at all. As with all TVRs there is no specific point in time when they changed styles; changes were gradually introduced as parts ran out.

The suspension track is slightly wider on the V8S achieved with revised wishbones at the front and revised trailing arms at the rear. Disc brakes are fitted all round.

0–60 mph (97 km/h) could be achieved in 4.9 seconds and 100 mph (161 km/h) in 12.9 seconds. Production ended in 1994.

=== 2-litre V8S ===
The TVR 2-litre V8S was a 2-litre supercharged version of the V8S - this was created for the Italian market in response to their car taxation based on engine capacity. The engine was a modified 3.5 litre Rover V8 fitted with a smaller-throw crank to reduce the engine capacity, retaining the 88.9 mm bore but with a short stroke of 40.25 mm. This meant a displacement of 1,998 cc (2.0 L), with a compression rate of 8.0:1. Lucas electronic fuel injection was fitted, along with an intercooled Eaton supercharger. All of this produced 233 PS (171 kW; 230 bhp) at 6,200 rpm and 266 N⋅m (196 lb⋅ft) at 3,700 rpm. Performance was on par with the bigger V8s, with a top speed of 232 km/h (144 mph) and 0–100 km/h (62 mph) coming up in 6.5 seconds. Ventilated disc brakes were fitted up front, and the 2-litre V8 also got adjustable ride height hydraulic shocks. The TVR Club estimates seven were built, and no more than ten.
