= Theme Aquarium =

1998 video game

- Developer(s): Tose
- Publisher(s): JP: Electronic Arts Square; EU: Electronic Arts
- Platform(s): PlayStation, Microsoft Windows
- Release: PlayStation: JP: 17 December 1998; Microsoft Windows: EU: 25 December 2000
- Genre(s): Simulation, Strategy
- Mode(s): Single-player

Theme Aquarium (テーマ アクアリウム, Tēma Akuariumu) is a simulation video game published by Electronic Arts Square, in which the player creates and controls a sea life aquarium. It was originally released on 17 December 1998 for PlayStation only in Japan. The game was later ported to Microsoft Windows under the name Aquarium and was released in Europe on 25 December 2000.

== Gameplay ==
The gameplay is very similar to the other games in the Theme series, and the graphics are similar to Theme Park. In Theme Aquarium, the player begins with an expanse of empty floor space and the task is to construct a maritime attraction for visitors which must be filled with interesting and appropriate creatures at the same time as dealing with all the attendant challenges of running a profitable business. There are two ways of getting fish and other sea life, either by buying them off sellers or by catching them yourself. Dolphin shows can also be created and serve as the star attraction of the aquarium. Staff must be hired to maintain the aquarium and also to take proper care and attention to the animals.

== Development ==
In a 1999 interview, Bullfrog Productions co-founder Les Edgar stated that Theme Aquarium was produced and tested in the United Kingdom, but implemented in Japan. His intention was to "cross barriers" between the United Kingdom and Japan, and produce a game suitable for both markets, as, due to the success of Theme Park and Populous in Japan, he thought Bullfrog were more successful than other companies in producing games that were successful there. He commented that it sold well in Japan, but would not in the United Kingdom, and that the idea of having the producers in the United Kingdom and the development team in Japan worked. In 2012, Bullfrog programmer Jonty Barnes asked fourteen ex-colleagues about the game, none of whom were familiar with it, with one describing it as "one of those obscure titles", although he also stated that it was known that it was intended for a Japan-only release on the PlayStation.

== Other versions ==
=== Windows port ===
The game was originally intended to only be released in Japan, but Electronic Arts later developed an English version of the game. This version was not to be on PlayStation, the game's original platform, but rather on Microsoft Windows. Not only was the English version on a different platform but it was also renamed. It was released simply as Aquarium on 15 December 2000 only in Europe. The "Theme" brand was dropped from the title as it was deemed that the game was not at a level of quality to be considered part of the Theme series or feature the Bullfrog branding, and was merely included as part of the PlayStation release to generate interest from the success of previous Theme games in Japan.

A "Collector's Edition" version was released a year later on 5 October 2001.

=== PlayStation Network release ===
Theme Aquarium has been released as a PS one Classic in Japan, allowing it to be played on PlayStation 3 and PlayStation Portable. It was released on 24 September 2009 and was available to download from the PlayStation Network store.

== See also ==
- Zoo Tycoon: Marine Mania, a similar simulation game
