= TVR =

British manufacturer of sports cars

TVR Electric Vehicles Limited
- Formerly: TVR Manufacturing Limited (2013–2022)
- Type: Public
- Industry: Automotive
- Founded: 1946; 80 years ago
- Founder: Trevor Wilkinson (founder); Jack Pickard (co-founder)
- Headquarters: Walliswood, Surrey
- Area served: Europe
- Key people: Les Edgar (Chairman); Steve Rouse (design engineer); Jim Berriman (CEO)
- Products: Automobiles, Automotive parts
- Owners: Syndicate of British Businessmen; Welsh Government (3%)
- Website: tvr.co.uk

TVR Electric Vehicles Limited is a British manufacturer of sports cars. The company manufactures lightweight sports cars with powerful engines and was, at one time, the third-largest specialised sports car manufacturer in the world, offering a diverse range of coupés and convertibles.

== History ==
The abbreviation TVR stems from the name of the company's founder Trevor Wilkinson, his first garage sporting the letters T, V, and R. The history of TVR can be divided into several eras, each of which is associated with the company's owner at the start of that period:

- 1946–1965, founder Trevor Wilkinson, who left in 1962
- 1965–1981, Martin Lilley
- 1981–2004, Peter Wheeler
- 2004–2013, Nikolay Smolensky
- 2013–2025, syndicate of British businessmen led by Les Edgar
- 2025— , brand purchased by Charge Holdings

=== Wilkinson era ===
==== Founding ====
Trevor Wilkinson (14 May 1923 – 6 June 2008) was born in Blackpool and left school at 14 to start an engineering apprenticeship at a local garage.

In 1946, he purchased an old wheelwright's workshop in Beverley Grove, Blackpool, to start an engineering business that he named Trevcar Motors. Initially, the company performed general engineering work (not always automobile related), and would also refresh and service cars and trucks. In 1947, local auto enthusiast Jack Pickard joined the company. Trevcar Motors was subsequently renamed to TVR Engineering (dropping several letters from Wilkinson's first name), and it continued to find general mechanical engineering work through the following years.

==== One-off specials: TVR One, Two, and Three (1949–1953) ====
In 1949, TVR built its first original chassis. The Hotchkiss-style rear suspension used the live axle from a Morris Eight, and the front suspension was of an independent trailing-arm design. The engine was a Ford 1,172 cc sidevalve from a 1936 van, tuned to 35 hp. Even before the car was bodied, it was crashed by the man hired to create the bodywork, Les Dale. After repairs, the body was styled and built from aluminium, and painted British racing green. Although neither Wilkinson nor Pickard found the finished bodywork to be very aesthetically appealing, it was functional, and the two men conducted the first successful test drive on the runway at Squires Gate aerodrome in 1949. Later that year, TVR Number One was sold to Wilkinson's cousin for £325. It was later crashed and salvaged for parts.

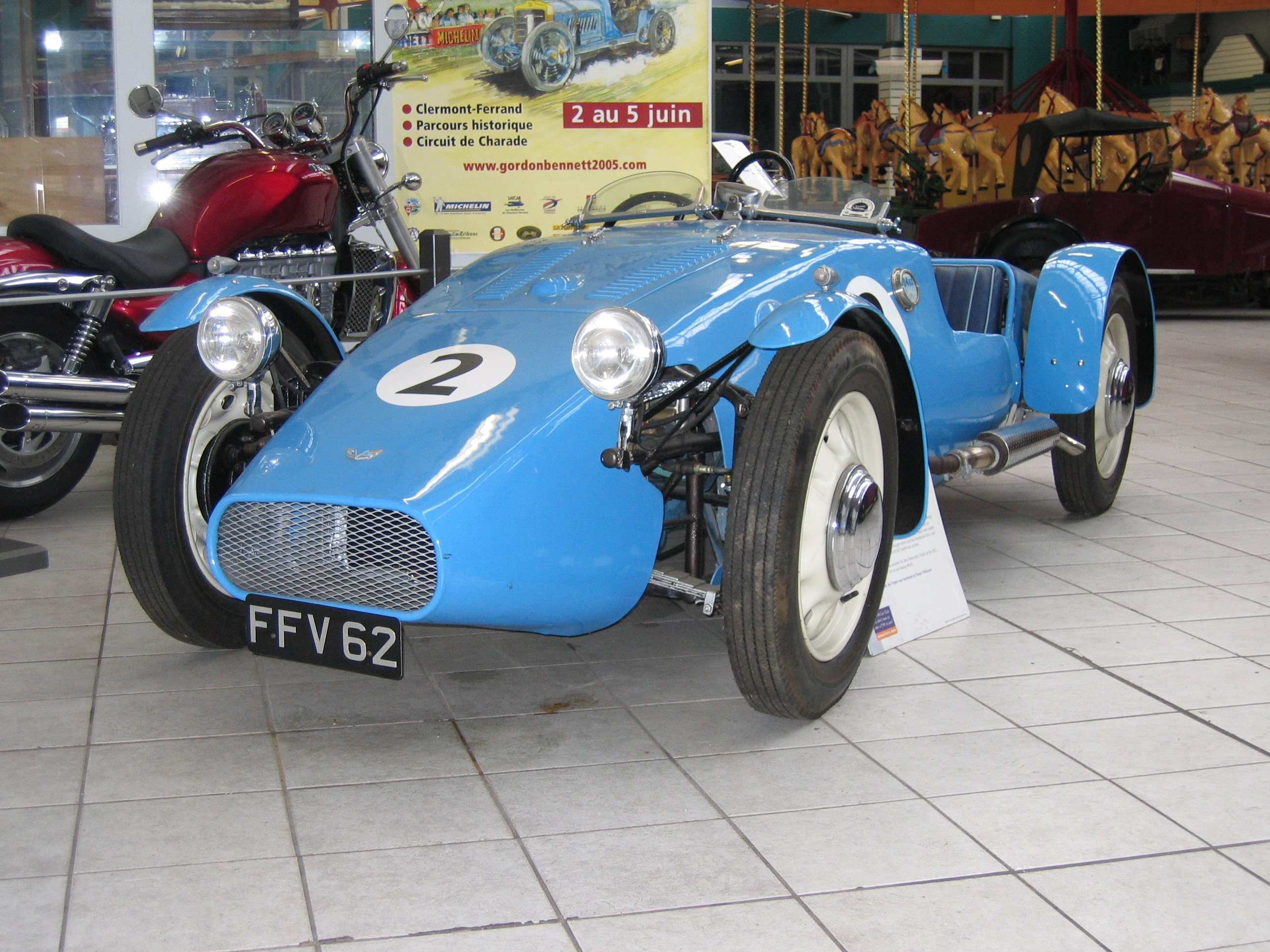
TVR No. 2 after its body refresh. Photographed at Lakeland Motor Museum, Newby Bridge, Cumbria

TVR Number Two began with the same chassis design found on the first car, using the rear axle, springs, dampers, brakes, and steering from the Morris Eight, as well as the same sidevalve Ford engine. However, the front suspension design was changed to use wishbone control arms and a single transverse leaf spring. The bodywork was again constructed by Les Dale, and it was similar in appearance to the first car. An auto enthusiast local to Blackpool purchased the car for use in competition, although it was eventually registered for road use in 1952. Around this time, the car was refreshed: it received a new body style with a lower nose, and some different instrumentation and equipment (including a tachometer from a Supermarine Spitfire and Marchal headlamps from a Delage.)

After the sale of the Number Two car, TVR began work on Number Three, which again used the same chassis and suspension design. Instead of the sidevalve Ford engine, it was fitted with the 1,200 cc 40 hp OHV four-cylinder engine from an Austin A40. This car was painted yellow, and in contrast to the rounded bodywork of the first and second cars, it was styled with a blunt nose and a squarish vertical panel as the grille. Driven by Wilkinson in a number of car club events (such as sprints and hillclimbs) in 1952 and 1953, the car was quick enough to earn several awards. It was during these club events that one David Hives was introduced to the TVR management, and he would become a key TVR employee a decade later. Hives helped set up the production line at Griffith Motors in Syosset, New York.

==== Sports (1953–1955) ====
In the summer of 1953, Wilkinson and Pickard began working on the design of a new chassis, which was intended to accept the engine, gearbox, and other components from the Austin A40 (including the independent coil-spring front suspension and rear axle.) Significantly, it did not incorporate an upper body frame, and the engineers intended to provide the car for sale as a kit with a fiberglass body. Approximately twenty; these three cars used an RGS Atalanta body manufactured by special builder Richard G. Shattock. With the Atalanta body included in the kit, the car was named the "TVR Sports Saloon". The kit was first offered for sale in 1954 for £650. It was with this car that TVR first produced a brochure to advertise a product: it quoted some figures, such as the car's 635 kg (1,400 lb) weight and 0-97 km/h (60 mph) time of 13 seconds. It was also on the Sports Saloon that the first incarnation of TVR's badge appeared, designed by a young art student and Wilkinson's friend, John Cookson.

The first Sports Saloon was finished in Spring 1954, and Wilkinson first campaigned it in the Morecambe Rally from 21 to 23 May. He used it in a number of other events to increase exposure to TVR's products, and would drive the car regularly in competition and on the road over the next eight years.

The chassis built by TVR were all made in accordance with customer specifications, and therefore no two of them left the factory in exactly the same configuration. The extra exposure created by using the Sports Saloon in competition led to potential customers inquiring about the availability of other body styles. TVR sold kits with Microplas Mistal bodies, and at least two different styles from Rochdale Motor Panels & Engineering Ltd. The engines fitted were typically the Ford 1,172 cc (1.2 L) sidevalve or Austin A40 1,200 cc (1.2 L) OHV engines. There was at least one instance of a car being fitted with the 1,489 cc (1.5 L) BMC B-Series engine (as fitted to the MG MGA), and one chassis was built to accommodate a customer's 2 1/2-litre Lea-Francis engine.

==== Ray Saidel and the Jomar ====
In 1955, the company started development of new semi-spaceframe chassis with a central backbone. This chassis used outriggers and a steel bulkhead to carry mounting points for doors. In contrast to the earlier chassis, the new design allowed for the seats to be mounted low (six inches from the ground) on either side of the backbone tunnel. The trailing arm suspension from the Volkswagen Beetle was used for both the front and rear suspension, setting the precedent of all-independent suspension for TVRs in the future.

Later in that year, TVR Engineering received a letter (dated 29 August) from Ray Saidel in Manchester, New Hampshire. Saidel was a successful racing driver and owned the Merrimack Street Garage in Manchester. He indicated that he would be interested in purchasing a TVR chassis fitted with a Coventry Climax FWA engine. TVR completed the chassis in May 1956, and it had arrived in New Hampshire by June of that year, where it was given an aluminum body. This car was the first of several to be designated "Jomar Mk2" (the name being derived from Saidel's children, Joanna and Marc, and the fact that this generation of the car was the second after the first Dellow-chassis Jomar.)

Around this time, Bernard Williams, a motoring enthusiast who lived in Lytham St Annes, expressed interest in becoming involved in the company. By July 1955, he had been hired as the director of TVR Engineering. Wilkinson and Pickard were amenable to this because of their limited interest in financial and business administration; both were more interested in the chassis and components engineering. With renewed optimism about the future success of TVR, Wilkinson moved operations from the Beverley Grove garage to three buildings at Fielding's Industrial Estate in Hoo Hill, Layton, Blackpool. The buildings occupied by TVR Engineering were somewhat in poor state; holes in the glass roof panels admitted snow in the winter.

Even before receiving his first chassis in June, 1956, Saidel had placed orders for two more chassis. TVR Engineering, bolstered by the influx of sales, hired two more employees: Stanley Kilcoyne, a welder, and Josef Mleczek, a general components fitter. In the following years, Mleczek (nicknamed "The Pole") would become an expert fibreglass laminator, and would ultimately direct operation in TVR's body shop. Also around this time, Bernard Williams introduced a wealthy investor named Fred Thomas, who would join TVR as a director.

==== Open Sports and Coupe (1956–1958) ====
In mid-1956, Wilkinson and Pickard undertook to create the first original TVR body style, which would be fitted on the Jomar-style chassis. The body shape was created with the use of two Microplas Mistral nose sections, one for the bonnet and one (reversed) for the rear. Although never officially named, this car is usually referred to as the TVR Open Sports. The first car, painted red and fitted with a Coventry Climax engine, was tested successfully by Wilkinson at the Aintree Motor Racing Circuit in the summer of 1956. Either three or four TVR Open Sports were built in total, although the true number is not known due to incomplete records. One of the cars was provided to Autosport Magazine writer Francis Penn for testing. He drove it at Aintree and described its steering response and grip as "superb".

To address feedback from customers about the Open Sports lacking daily-use practicality, the designers at TVR created a fixed-head notchback coupe body. This body was fitted to the same semi-spaceframe chassis to create a car that became known as the TVR Coupe. As with previous models, it was offered with the choice of several engines, including the Ford 100E sidevalve, the Coventry Climax FWA, and the 1,489 cc (1.5 L) MGA engine. When the Ford sidevalve was selected, the customer had the further option of fitting a Shorrock supercharger. One of the Coupes was used by the factory as a demonstrator model, and was driven by Mike Hawthorn.

On 10 January 1958, the TVR Coupe made its first public appearance at H & J Quick Ltd showroom in Manchester, England: "The designers are Mr. Trevor Wilkinson and Mr. Bernard Williams, who run the T.V.R. engineering company at Layton, Blackpool, and who have been making chassis for special car builders for some years. A little over two years ago they were asked by the American racing car enthusiast, Mr. Raymond Saidel, of Manchester, New Hampshire, to design a racing chassis. For twelve months this chassis was tested and improved on tracks in the United States and in the last year a team of six T.V.R.s has been racing regularly in the United States." Competition Press reported: "Jomar has gone into Formula racing, too. The Jomar monoposto has been designed by Ray and is built in his Manchester N.H. shop (the sports car chassis are built for him in England)." In 1959, Motor Sport reported: "The cars are made in Blackpool and the majority of the production is exported to America, where the sports version is known as the Jomar."

Ray Saidel, enthusiastic about the prospect of selling TVRs in the United States, purchased several cars in addition to the rolling chassis that he had bought previously; he imported one Open Sports and three Coupes, with the intention of selling them under the Jomar name. He was not especially successful in selling the cars, and felt that one problem lay in the car's styling. Saidel wrote to the factory and suggested that the next model be styled as a fastback.

==== Introduction of the Grantura ====
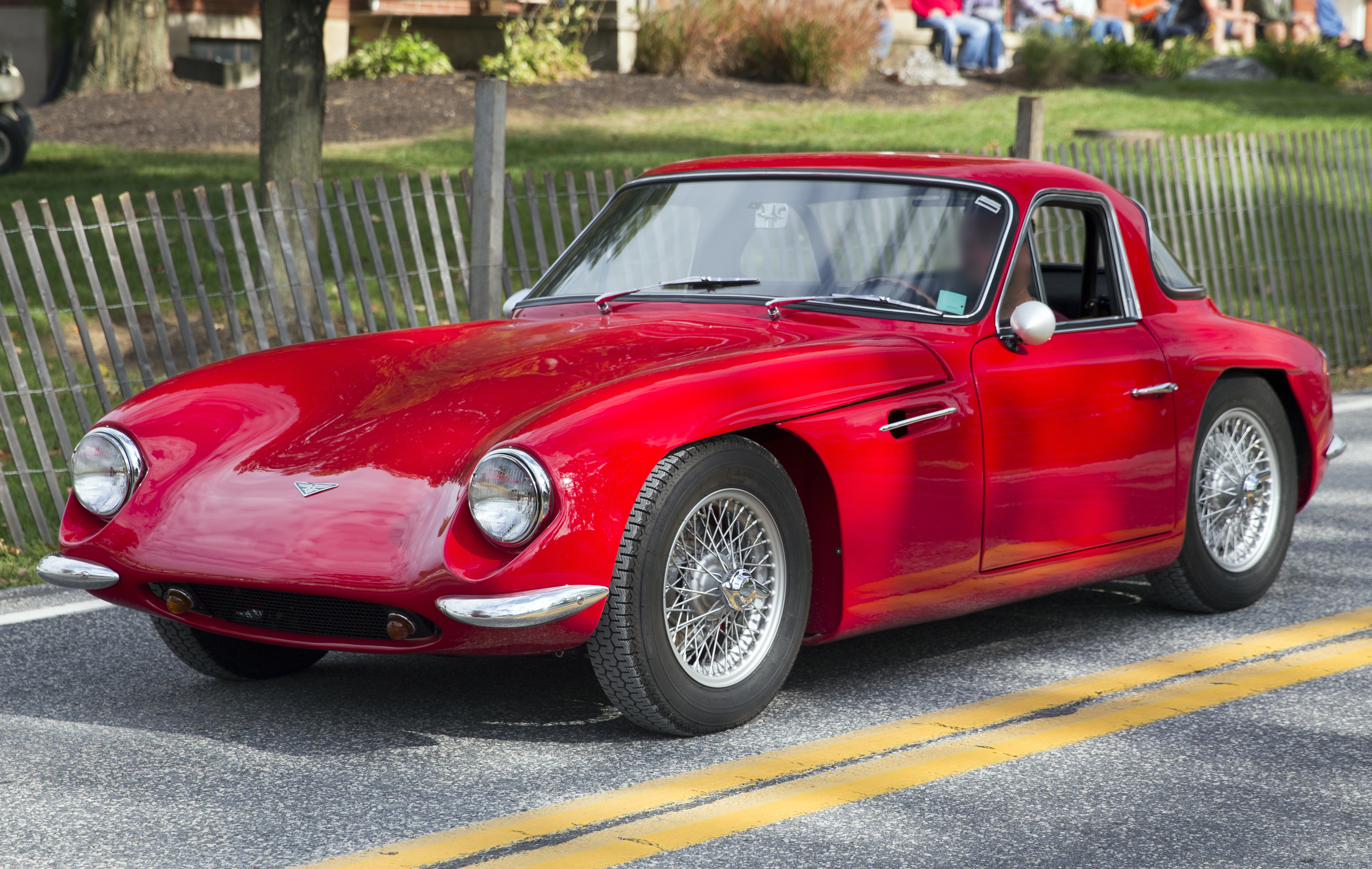
TVR Grantura Mk2

The next model produced by TVR was the Grantura Mark 1, which used a fastback-style body over the existing chassis design (with the same trailing-arm independent suspension front and rear.) Engine options included the Ford 100E sidevalve (normally aspirated or supercharged), the Ford 105E OHV unit, two different Coventry Climax units, or the MGA's BMC B-series. The interior of the Grantura was cramped, with the short doors and 17"-diameter steering wheel making it difficult to enter and exit the car. Climax-powered cars would be finished with a leather interior, while cars with the lower-specification engines were trimmed with vinyl.

The TVR factory sent the first Mk1 cars to Ray Saidel in the United States, where they would be offered for sale as the "Jomar Coupe" or the "Jomar Gran Turismo Coupe", depending on which engine had been fitted. Some of these cars carried both the "Jomar" and "TVR" badging on the nose.

A 1958 advertisement from Saidel Sports-Racing Cars offered two models. The Jomar Mk2 (with fibreglass or aluminum bodywork and the Climax engine) was listed with the copy, only 930 lbs and "Outhandles Everything." The second model, the Jomar Coupe, a 1,712 cc (1.7 L). fixed-head sports car. These cars utilised the same chassis. In 1959, Motor Sport reported:

The JOMAR COUPE is the result of a joint Anglo-American project. The firm of T.V.R. Engineering of Blackpool, England is responsible for the basic-designing and building of the JOMAR chassis upon which in 1956 and 1957 Saidel Sports-Racing cars of Manchester, New Hampshire, using aluminum bodies of their own design carried out extensive research and development. Through the efforts of both concerns the successful MK2 was evolved.

Before the name "Grantura" was selected, some alternatives were briefly considered. A model name of "Trevor" was rejected, as was the suggestion of "Hoo Hill Hellcat" (which was proposed by Averil Scott-Moncrieff, the wife of TVR director David "Bunty" Scott-Moncrieff.)

==== Layton Sports Cars and Grantura Engineering ====
In October 1958, TVR's debt with the bank was nearing £10,000. At that point in the year, the factory had completed as few as ten cars, and orders from the United States had almost ceased due to the lack of sales success there. All of this was of little concern to TVR director and financier Fred Thomas, as he had apparently intended to close TVR and use the failure as a tax loss to benefit his own engineering firm. In actuality, the directors decided on 30 October that the company would be dissolved and re-formed as Layton Sports Cars Ltd. When the new company began trading in December 1958, the directors voted to immediately inject £15,000 to expand the workforce and build stocks of car components. In February 1959, a sister company was formed under the name Grantura Engineering Ltd. to avoid incurring the UK's Purchase Tax on sales of the cars (which were then still being offered as kits); Purchase Tax would not be applied to kit cars that were purchased from a different company than that which supplied the mechanical components.

TVR received some positive publicity when Autocar magazine dedicated three pages in its March 1959 issue to a technical description of the Grantura Mk1. The company continued to struggle with the rate of production, still only able to build about one car per month. With the order backlog having grown to around fifteen cars by the end of March, the board voted to replace Trevor Wilkinson with Henry Moulds as the new production manager. Moulds was a car enthusiast and friend of Bunty Scott-Moncrieff. Wilkinson would remain involved with the company, although his influence had been diminished by the appointment of Moulds as the new manager.

The already-strained relationship with Ray Saidel in New Hampshire was finally broken during negotiations between Saidel and TVR in May 1959. Derek Harris, the TVR chairman, attempted to pressure Saidel into purchasing fifty cars per year (rather than the previously agreed upon twenty-five.) Saidel walked out of the negotiations and made it clear in a letter to the factory, dated 18 June, that he felt TVR's expectations to be extremely unrealistic. By July 1959, the situation at TVR was dire; there were significant inconsistencies in pricing and in financial recordkeeping, stocks of components were not being properly managed, the factory did not employ enough skilled workers, and there were serious doubts about the capability of the company's leadership.

In an attempt to re-establish a distributor network in the United States, the factory accepted an order for two cars from Continental Motors in Washington, D.C., which also happened to be the North American distributor for the Elva Courier. TVR had to have the cars returned to the UK when Continental Motors was shut down after its owner, Walter R. Dickson, was convicted and jailed for defrauding his bank.

An engineer (and earlier TVR customer) named John Thurner left his position at Rolls-Royce and joined TVR in November 1959, whereupon he was named Technical Director. Thurner's experience and enthusiasm were sought to help the company improve the Grantura and to streamline production, and he was given full control of Grantura development. This raised the ire of Wilkinson, who regarded Thurner as a professional competitor and who felt that he was being undermined by the company he originally created.

==== Aitchison, Hopton and TVR Cars Ltd. ====
By the middle of 1960, the factory employed forty-three workers, the Grantura Mk1 production was ending (with a total of 100 cars produced), and the Mk2 body shell design was nearly ready. TVR had distributors selling cars in the UK, including David Buxton Ltd. in Derby and Bill Last in Woodbridge, Suffolk. In January 1961, Keith Aitchison and Bryan Hopton (of the Aitchison-Hopton Lotus/TVR dealer in Chester) expressed interest in investing in TVR. During the Summer, Bernard Williams attempted to cement their interest by offering a Climax-powered Grantura Mk2 to the two men for a drive to the Monza circuit in Italy. During the trip, a portion of the exhaust system fell off the car on two separate occasions, but the two men were nonetheless impressed with the car's performance.

In September of the same year, the Aitchison-Hopton company bought a controlling share of TVR. Before the end of the year, Hopton had appointed himself as chairman and renamed Layton Sport Cars to TVR Cars Ltd. Between September 1961 and February 1962, the number of orders for cars had been doubled, and most of the stock of finished cars had been sold.

In January 1962, the company hired Ken Richardson as a competitions manager, with the intent that he would lead TVR's attempts to enter international racing. In March, Hopton entered three Grantura Mk2As in the 12 Hours of Sebring. The lightweight cars were prepared by chief mechanic David Hives and competitions mechanic Bob Hallett, although only one of them would actually finish the race (the other two retiring early with mechanical failure.) TVR directors began to doubt the new leadership when they saw Bryan Hopton's tendency to overextend the company's finances in motor racing, as well as on indulgences such as luxury transport and hotels. This ill-fated race outing at Sebring was the last in a series of events that led to the departure of Trevor Wilkinson, whose resignation was accepted by the board of directors on 5 April 1962.

After both Wilkinson and Pickard left TVR, they together set up a specialist fiberglass engineering business. On retirement, Wilkinson moved to Menorca, Spain, where he died aged 85, on 6 June 2008.

Despite the lack of success at Sebring, the company continued to enter international motor racing events in 1962, including the Dutch Tulip Rally in May, and the 24 Hours of Le Mans in June. The Tulip Rally resulted in one car finishing third in its class, but the Le Mans outing was fraught with unfortunate events for the TVR team. In the time leading up to the race, two of the cars slated to compete were crashed in different incidents and hastily rebuilt. The single car that started the race would badly overheat and retire during the third lap. David Hives described the event as a "fiasco", and noted that "it cost TVR a small fortune". TVR cars were driven to greater success by World War II flying ace Tommy Entwistle, who, in 1962 and 1964, finished as runner-up in the Freddie Dixon Challenge Trophy race series. Entwistle won the series in 1963, 1965, and 1966. The car was maintained by David Hives throughout this time. After this racing success, Entwistle stopped racing for a period of time and sold the car to Gerry Sagerman.

By late 1962, the company was again in dire financial trouble. The Mk3 Grantura had been introduced later than expected, two of the home market distributors had gone out of business (Research Garage and David Buxton Ltd.), the Canadian government had imposed a 10% duty on cars imported from the United Kingdom, and the company discontinued its relationship with Dick Monnich, the US importer, because of his failure to pay for his orders. Factory workers were all laid off in October 1962, and Henry Moulds and Bernards Williams met with the company's creditors in December. TVR Cars Ltd. moved into receivership and much of its equipment, including body moulds, was moved to secure storage.

Fortunately for the future of TVR, its associated company, Grantura Engineering Ltd., was still in business. Bernard Williams was able to convince the receivers of TVR Cars Ltd. to allow access to the body moulds as well as some partially finished body shells, and several cars were completed in late 1963 and early in 1964. Keith Aitchison again became involved with the company in spring 1963, and remained as marketing and sales director for the following two years. Many of the factory workers and some of the directors were persistent, remaining with the company in an attempt to return TVR to profitability. Early 1963 saw the creation of Grantura Plastics Ltd., a company that handled the fiberglass moulding.

Also in 1963, a new shareholder, Richard Barnaby, initiated talks with Major Tony Rolt of Ferguson Developments over the possibility of developing a four-wheel drive V8-powered TVR. Barnaby asked David Hives to make the chassis for such a car, which he did, although TVR did not have the funds available to commit to such a project in full. It was later revealed that Rolt had been discussing a similar project with Jensen Motors, which ultimately resulted in the Jensen FF.

The company's recovery effort brought a partnership with a new distributor, The TVR Centre of Reece Mews, South Kensington, London. Its owner was James Boothby, an ex-RAF pilot.

After re-establishing a distributor partnership with TVR, the American Dick Monnich visited Blackpool and informed the directors that one of his colleagues, Andrew Jackson "Jack" Griffith, was a Ford dealer based on Long Island, and he had been experimenting with installing a Ford 289 engine in a Grantura Mk3 chassis. This car would ultimately become known as the Griffith Series 200.

==== The Griffith and 1965 collapse ====
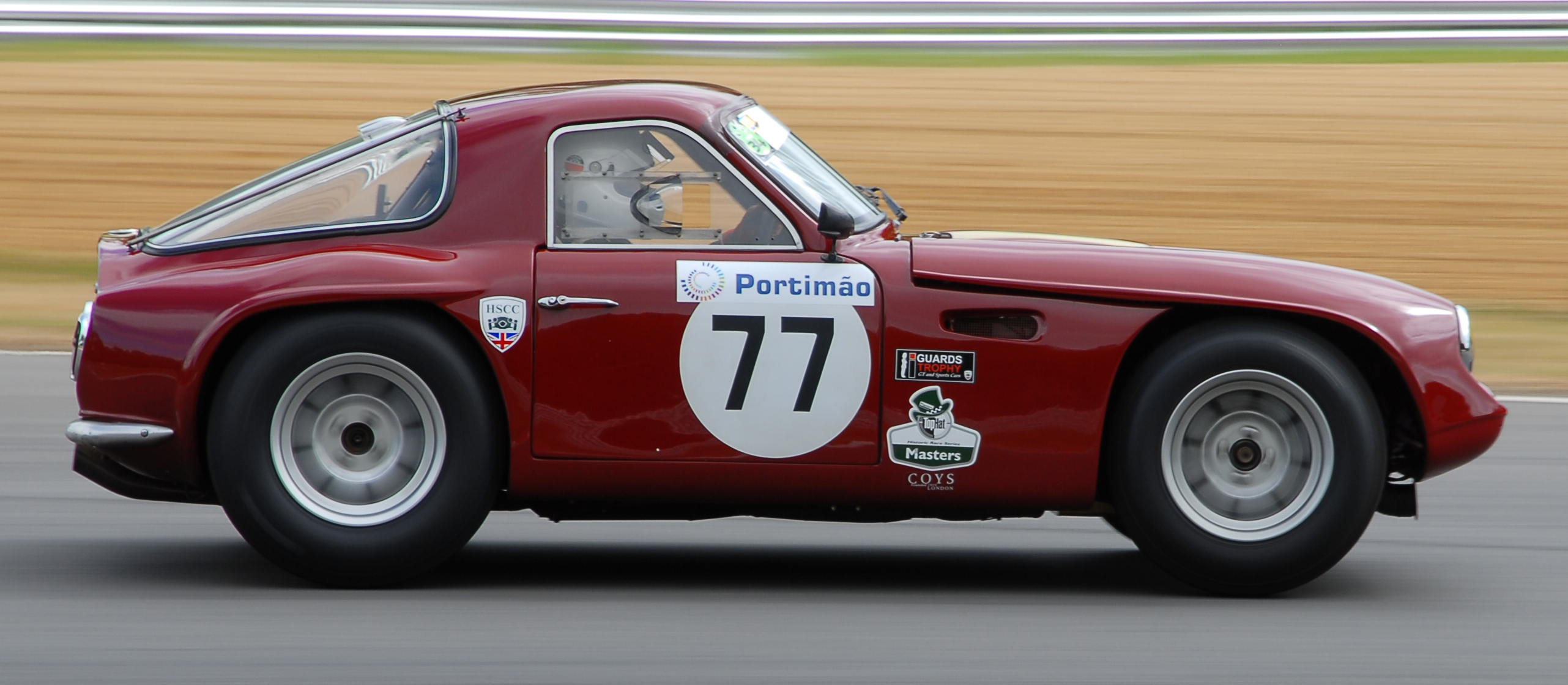
1965 Griffith 400 being raced at Brands Hatch

In October 1963, Dick Monnich, Jack Griffith, and Griffith's race mechanic George Clark finished the prototype of the car named Griffith, developed by fitting a Ford 289 V8 into a Grantura Mk3. The accelerative performance of the car exceeded expectations, although the brakes and chassis had been left unmodified and, by all accounts, were woefully inadequate when matched with the large engine. In a short period of time, David Hives at the Hoo Hill TVR factory built a second prototype that was better developed and better finished, as well as three engineless cars destined for Griffith's business in New York. In March 1964, David Hives went to Long Island to assist Bob Cumberford in building a pattern and plug for the Griffith 600 series, and he also helped set up the production line with George Clark. Hives helped build the "tartan car" that was displayed at the International Automobile Show in New York, which he and Dick Monnich attended. After this, the Griffith factory established in Syosset, Long Island, New York, began completing cars from engineless cars imported from the Hoo Hill TVR factory.

Amidst the Griffith production (which required the TVR factory to build cars at a greater rate than ever before), Major Timothy Knott was hired as the managing director in August 1964. His military background and strict enforcement of order and workday schedule prevented him from ingratiating himself with most of the factory workers. Knott subsequently hired Ralph Kissack, also from a military background, and whose family was involved with Peel Engineering Company on the Isle of Man.

David Hives returned to the TVR factory in England on 1 September 1964. Immediately, he was put onto building the Griffith 400 Series, which involved a lot of work at MIRA (Motor Industry Research Association). It also required working with Armstrong Patents to source the springs and dampers, Janspeed for the exhaust systems, and Kenlowe for the twin fan radiators. After six Months of working on the 400 series, Hives handed the car over to Chris Laurence to finish off development work so that he could concentrate on the upcoming Trident project.

The original TVR logo was designed in 1964 by Bob Hallett and John Baillie. It was subsequently updated in 2018 as part of an updated corporate identity delivered by Forge Design Consultancy, "suitable for both digital and print media - to support their international relaunch."

Reliability problems and customer complaints began to mount through 1964. In 1964, a dock strike in the US severely damaged Jack Griffith's ability to import cars. Griffith was then unable to meet his financial obligation to Ford, which stopped supplying drivetrain components. Ties with TVR were also then severed, and the already-struggling TVR was no longer able to continue. In September 1964, a director meeting was held at TVR, and it was announced that the company would be stopping production and closing the factory at Hoo Hill. TVR went into liquidation in November of that year.

==== Trident ====
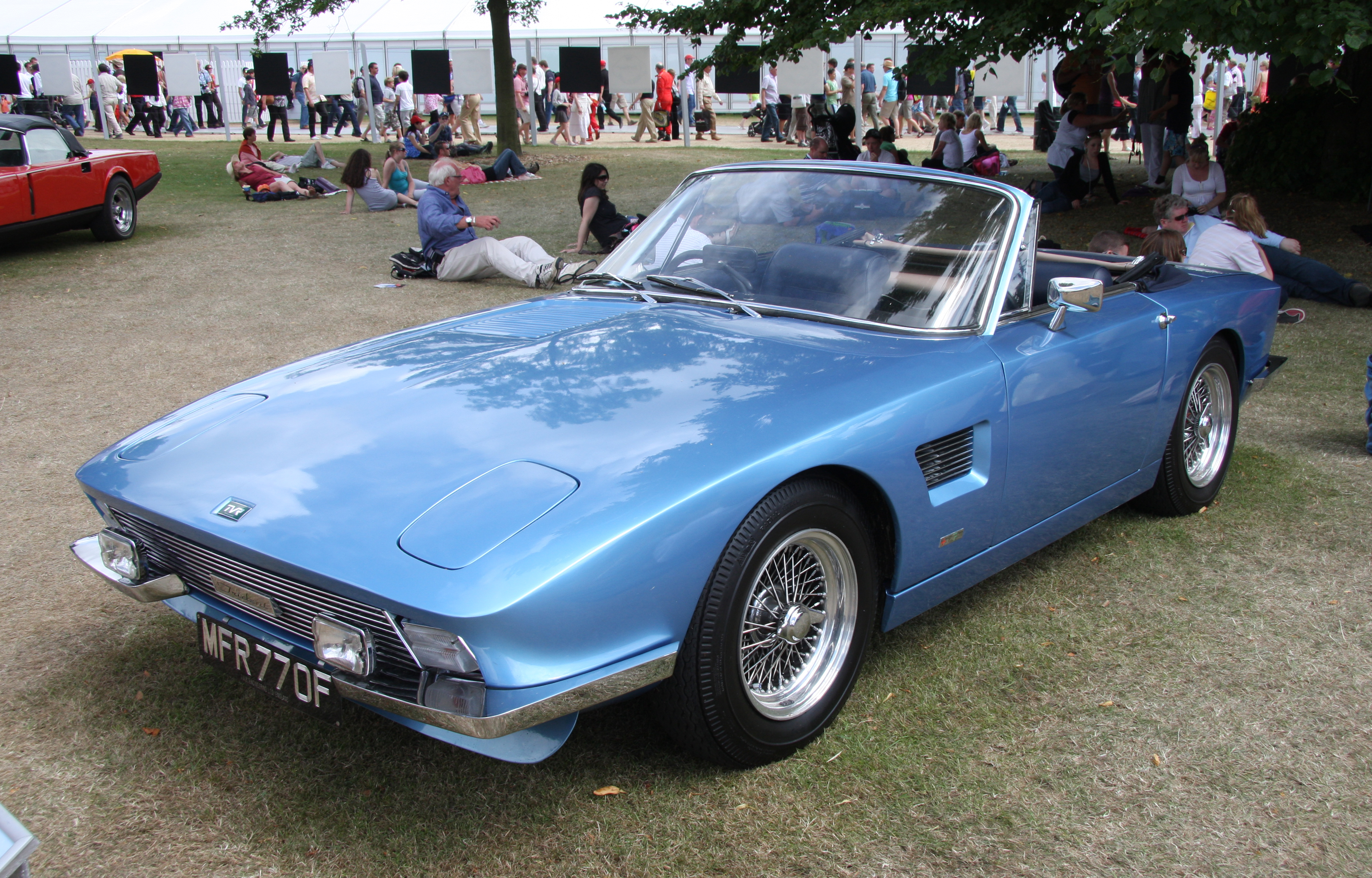
Trident roadster

In 1965, TVR produced four prototypes of a car named the Trident. It was powered by the same Ford V8 as was found in the Griffith, and the body was hand-built of aluminum and steel by Carrozzeria Fissore in Savigliano, Italy. The styling was the work of Trevor Fiore (born Trevor Frost), who borrowed the shape from his previous styling exercise for the Lea Francis Francesa (a conceptual roadster that never reached production).

Carrozzeria Fissore displayed a prototype Trident coupé at the Geneva Motor Show in March 1965. Despite very positive public reaction to the car, it was not well received by Jack Griffith, and the one prototype that had been shipped to the United States was returned to the UK in 1965. When TVR collapsed in 1965, the third and fourth Tridents were under construction at the time, and they were put into storage. In the wake of the company's liquidation, TVR dealer Bill Last acquired the rights to the Trident by some means not viewed as legitimate by later TVR management. In 1966, Last established in Trident Cars Ltd and started building the car under the model name "Clipper".

=== Lilley era ===
In late 1965, Arthur Lilley and his son Martin Lilley purchased the assets of TVR to mitigate their personal losses of £2,000 worth of TVR shares. TVR Engineering Ltd. was then formed on 30 November 1965, with Arthur as chairman. Arthur approached David Hives and offered him the position of General Manager and Senior Designs and Development Engineer, which David accepted. After two years of this arrangement, Hives asked Arthur Lilley to appoint his son Martin as managing director whilst Hives went to America to talk to Gerry Sagerman about the importation of TVRs. This ultimately resulted in Sagerman establishing TVR Cars of America.

TVR had no outstanding orders to fulfill, and significant outstanding debts towards suppliers. Additionally, members of previous work force had apparently stolen parts and damaged machinery out of spite when they were laid off. In the final days of 1965 and into early 1966, the new workforce gained confidence in management as it became apparent that the Lilleys were genuinely interested in the success of the business. The factory began to ramp up production of the Mk3 1800S. During the period, some partially finished cars were delivered as kits to Martin's Barnet Motor Co. car dealer business, where they were finished.

Meanwhile, the company also gained positive publicity as Gerry Marshall had significant success in racing a factory-prepared Griffith. In America, Gerry Sagerman lamented the damage done to the TVR reputation in the US by the poor build quality and poor reliability of Jack Griffith's V8-powered cars. After meeting the Lilleys, Sagerman agreed to be involved in importing TVRs to the US. In April 1967, he opened a small showroom and garage in Lynbrook, Long Island, and began importing TVRs as a full-time activity.

Arthur and Martin Lilley were aware that the company's future depended on the introduction of new, competitive models. Plans to put the Trident into full production were derailed when the Lilleys discovered that Bill Last had commandeered the rights to that design during the period of confusion between the previous TVR liquidation and the Lilley ownership. TVR engaged Carrozzeria Fissore to build the coachwork for the steel-bodied prototype TVR Tina. David Hives was very heavily involved with the Tina prototype project, and went to Italy with Arthur Lilley to inspect the car. He also accompanied Martin to the 1966 Turin Motor Show. Shortly after this, Hives was dismissed by Martin Lilley for unknown reasons; he was then approached by Bernard Williams and Bill Last to assist in the building of the Trident Clipper.

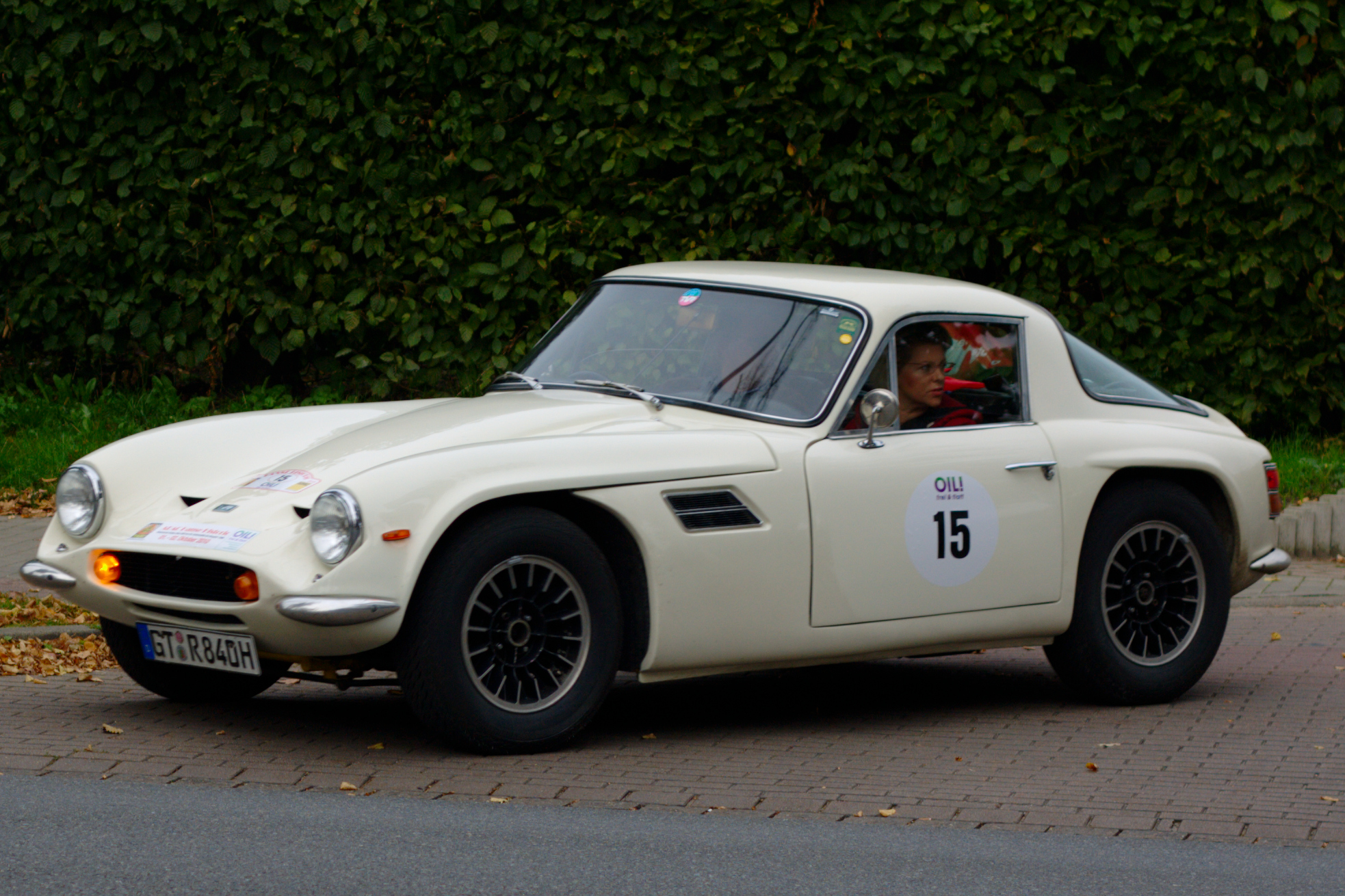
TVR Tuscan V8

In January 1967, after production of the Griffith had been discontinued, TVR unveiled the Tuscan V8, initially in short-wheelbase and then long-wheelbase configurations. It was first displayed at the Racing Car Show at Olympia, in London. The Tuscan did not provide the economic boost to TVR that the Lilleys had hoped, and it was only built in low volume. A Tuscan owned by racing driver John Burton was modified by race car mechanic Mike Bigland to improve the handling, and Bigland's success was noticed by Martin Lilley; this would be the beginning of a relationship that would be important in the development of the later M Series chassis.

==== Introduction of the Vixen ====
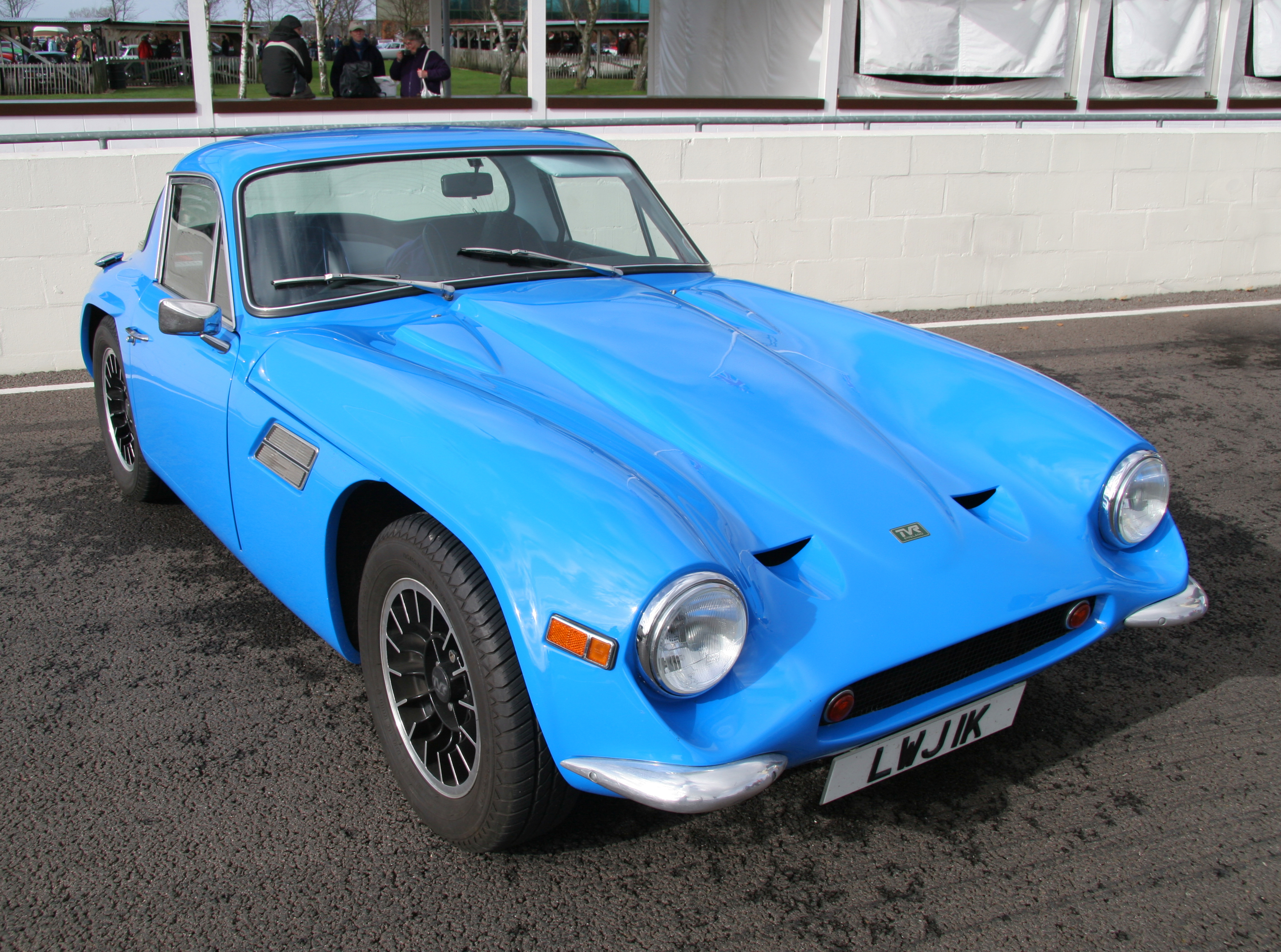
TVR Vixen

The TVR Vixen Series 1 was unveiled at the British motor show in October 1967. It proved popular, and generated many new orders for cars. With the launch of the Vixen, TVR transitioned back to making their own fiberglass bodies, rather than depending on Grantura Plastics to build them. Despite the sales success of the Vixen, the company still recorded an overall loss for 1967, and financial advisors began to recommend to Arthur Lilley that the company be shut down. Martin resolved to improve TVR's financial fortunes with increased production in 1968.

Around this time, in early 1968, the prospect of putting the TVR Tina into production became unfeasible due to the significant expense of building a steel-bodied car. The project was cancelled, with the only two existing Tinas being the two prototype cars. Bill Last also approached TVR and suggested a merger so that TVR Engineering could begin building the Trident in larger volumes. TVR declined this offer.

==== New models, new models and move to Bristol Avenue ====
Because the Ford Essex V6 engine had not yet been certified to meet US emissions standards, TVR engaged British Leyland in negotiations to supply either the Rover V8 engine or the 2.5 L Triumph inline six. Extra production for the Rover V8 had already been allocated to Morgan, so the six cylinder Triumph unit was selected.

During Christmas in 1970, TVR moved from its cramped facility at Hoo Hill to a 28,000 square foot Bristol Avenue factory that had been vacated by Nutbrown Ltd., a manufacturer of kitchen utensils. The workforce was enthusiastic about the move, as the Hoo Hill factory had become inadequate for the number of people working and the rate of production, which had risen to between five and eight cars per week.

Between 1969 and 1971, TVR released several new models. The Tuscan V6, equipped with the 3.0 L Ford Essex V6, was intended to fill the performance gap between the four-cylinder Vixens and the V8 models. The long wheelbase widebody Tuscan V8 was built to address the cramped interior dimensions of the car, but was not commercially successful and only a very small number were produced. The Vixen S3 incorporated several minor updates to the Vixen S2, which had continued to be successful. The new 2500 model was fitted with the Triumph 2.5 L inline-six engine. Working together in 1971, Martin Lilley and Mike Bigland developed yet another new model, the TVR 1300. This used the 1.3 L Standard SC engine from the Triumph Spitfire and was intended as an inexpensive model option that was also cheaper to insure.

At the British International Motor Show at Earls Court in 1970, TVR hired model Helen Jones to pose nude on the TVR stand, and the resulting commotion immediately generated more publicity for the company. This advertising technique was used again at the 1971 show, when Helen Jones was accompanied by a second model, Susan Shaw. The reaction was even greater in 1971, and amid the chaos of the public response, the Society of Motor Manufacturers and Traders threatened to ban TVR from the show. This, of course, drew even more attention to the brand. The 1971 show also marked the appearance of the M Series prototype bodywork and the prototype SM estate car.

==== SM / Zante concept ====
By 1971, TVR wanted to introduce a more luxurious GT car, and they ultimately began to work on a prototype sports estate model. The styling was done by Harris Mann (who would later become known for the Triumph TR7 and Leyland Princess designs), and the engineering by Mike Bigland. The prototype body was built by Specialised Mouldings Ltd. of Huntingdon, Cambridgeshire on a TVR 2500 chassis. The car was given the development name 'SM' and was intended chiefly as a styling exercise with essentially no thought given to fitment of mechanical components or to driver ergonomics. The car appeared at the 1972 British Motor Show as an engineless show car.

After the show, the car was renamed 'Zante' (after the Greek island) and test driven by both Martin Lilley and Gerry Sagerman in the US. They agreed that the car's ergonomics and visibility were not suitable for a road car, and Sagerman further pointed out that it would need a V8 engine to be successful in the US market. Also considering the anticipated development costs for the pop-up headlamps, it was decided the project was not financially viable and the prototype remained the only Zante ever built. The body was removed from the chassis at Sagerman's facility and shipped back to Blackpool, where it was stored outside and left to deteriorate.

==== M Series ====
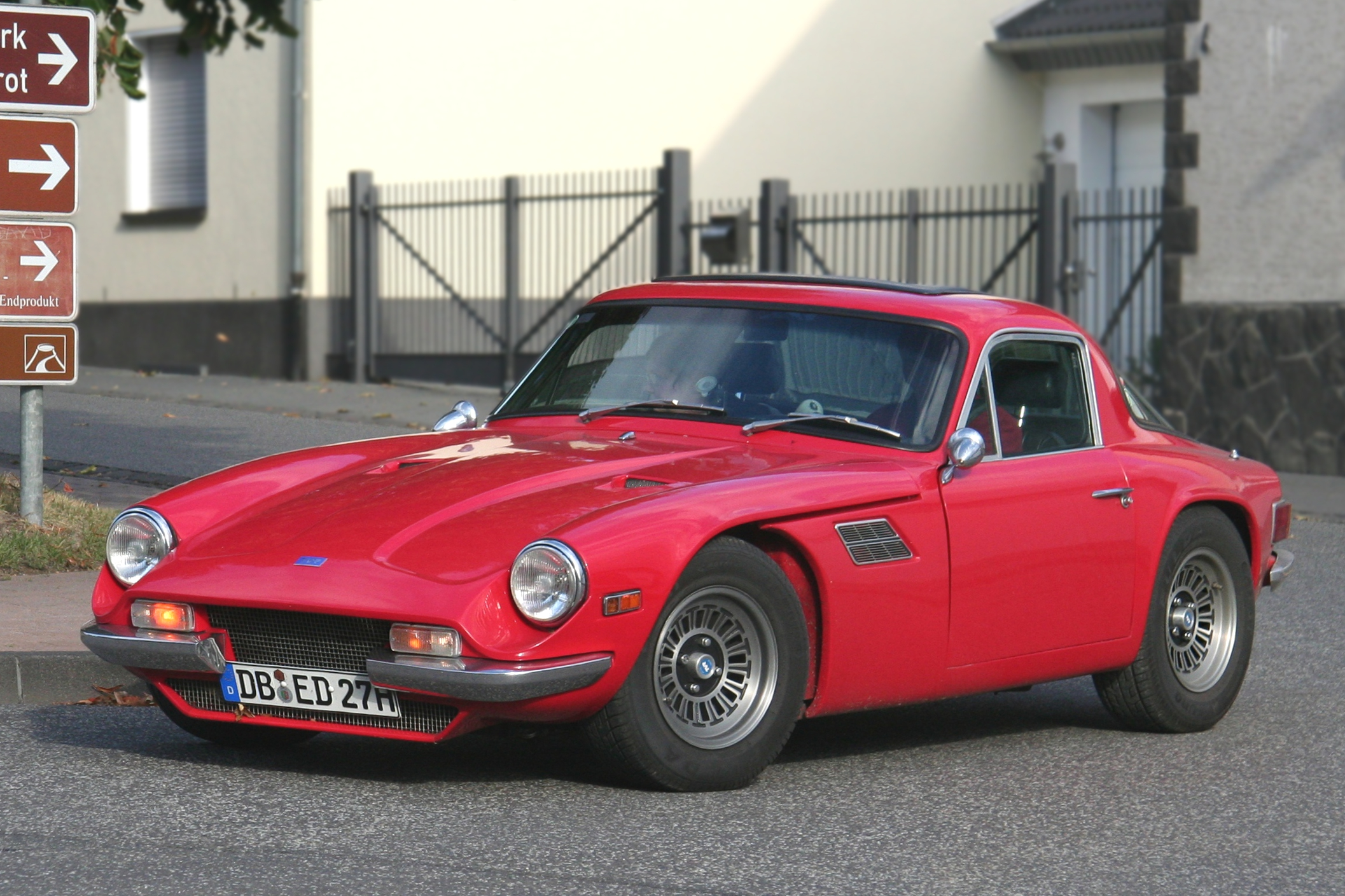
TVR 3000M

The TVR model series that would replace the Vixen-based cars was known as the M Series built from 1972. Mike Bigland would design its chassis, which was superior in every way to the outgoing Vixen chassis; it was more rigid, would provide better safety for the car's occupants, and could be produced more economically. Over several months, the design was finalised and the factory prepared for production. The 2500M, 3000M, 1600M, Taimar and 3000S models (as well as turbocharged variants of the V6 cars) were all built for various spans of time between 1972 and 1980. This period saw significant improvements in both efficiency and quality, with Mike Penny performing a quality control inspection on every car that left the factory. Also during M Series production, both Jack Pickard and Stanley Kilcoyne returned to work at the company. TVR had enough faith in the cars' quality to begin offering a five-year no-corrosion guarantee in 1974. Exports were strong, with sixty per cent of TVR's production going to continental Europe and the United States.

On the evening of 3 January 1975, a fire broke out in the TVR factory, likely caused by faulty wiring in a 3000M factory demonstrator car. Several complete and nearly complete cars were destroyed, as well as many components in the company's stores. Soot and ash covered every surface, and the damage was estimated to be £200,000. A small team of office workers came in to clean and perform administrative tasks while the insurance company made its assessment. The factory walls were sandblasted to remove the coating of soot, but the sand damaged many pieces of equipment that were not moved out first. Despite the lack of heat and electricity in the building, some limited amount of car construction began again. Four cars were completed in April, and then eight in May. Total production for the year was approximately 150 cars, and only about 20 of those were exported to the US, where Gerry Sagerman's business suffered as a result.

In late 1975 and 1976, the newly hired sales manager Stewart Halstead was charged with the task of expanding the home and European markets to stabilise TVR's future. Enthusiasm for the cars was high in the US, tempered by the fact that the cars' pricing had crept up over recent years to the point where the same money could buy a new Corvette. Opportunities continued to expand in Europe, where dealerships opened in Germany, Belgium, the Netherlands, and Switzerland.

==== Tasmin ====
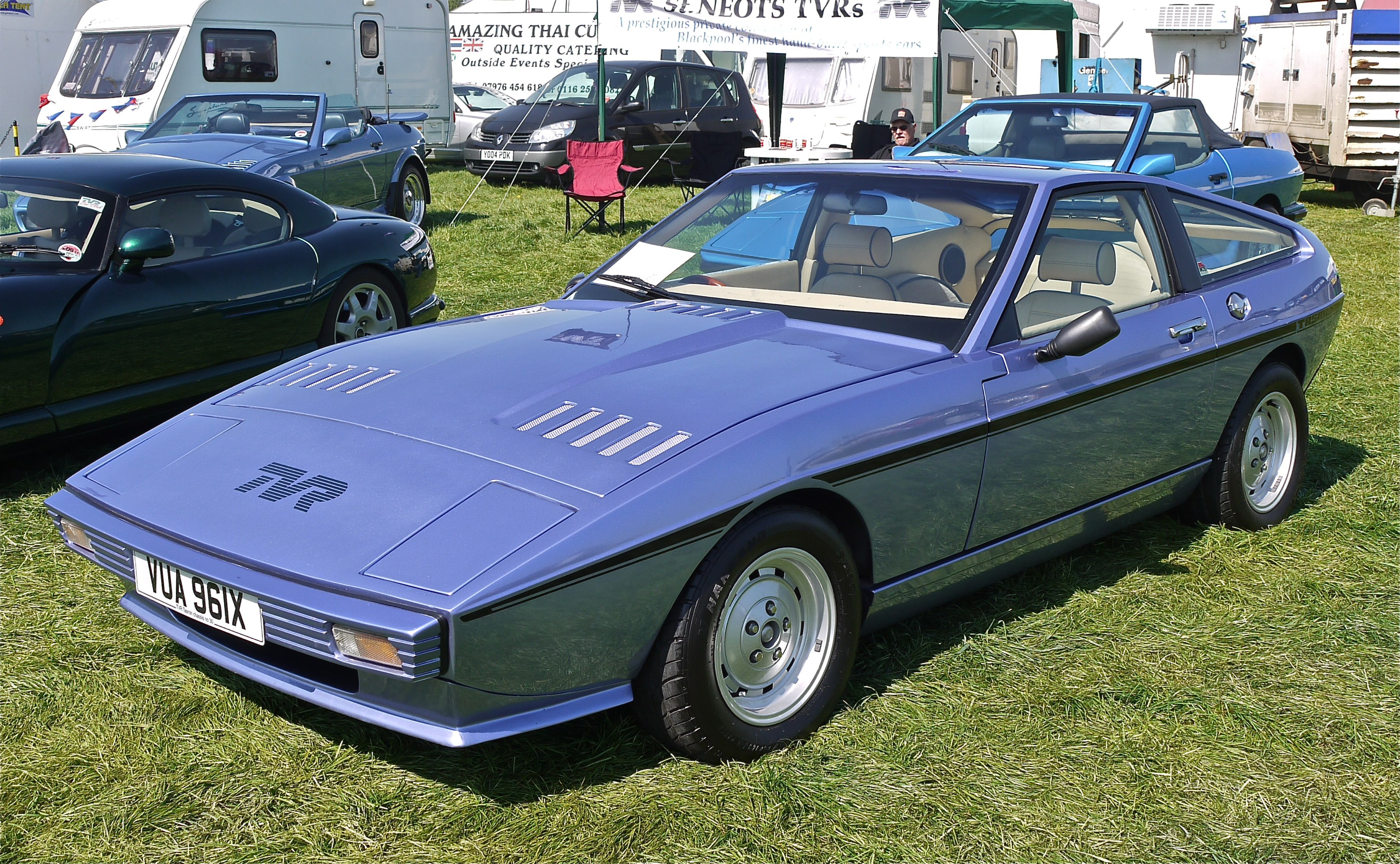
TVR Tasmin 280i

In the late 1970s, TVR's leadership felt that the next model should represent a modern departure in styling from the Vixen and M Series cars. It was also important that the replacement model could be economically produced and that it would be easier to bring into compliance with safety and emissions regulations. TVR management met with Oliver Winterbottom in August 1977, and it was decided that he would style a new two-seat coupe. Ian Jones, formerly of Lotus Cars and then of Larkspur Design near Southampton, was to design the chassis. The prototype project initially showed slow progress while it was being worked at the Topolec facility in Norwich, so it was moved to a unit that TVR began renting at Bamber Bridge. The prototype car began road testing in January 1979, powered by the 2.8-litre fuel injected Ford Cologne V6 engine. The name for the car, Tasmin, was created by blending the female name "Tamsin" with the name of the Australasian racing Tasman Series.

During the course of Tasmin development, TVR was short of funds to pay suppliers and this problem was compounded in late 1979 with the short-term loss of £100,000 worth of M Series cars that were impounded by the US federal government for non-compliance with emissions regulations. When the car's styling was finalised, it was not especially well received by TVR management (being described later by Martin Lilley and Stewart Halstead respectively as "a big disappointment" and "absolutely dreadful"), but time and budget limitations forced the company to proceed with the design.

After the Tasmin was released in 1980, it did receive a number of positive reviews from motoring journalists who praised its chassis and handling, sales were very lackluster due to the car's controversial styling and comparatively high price (£5,000 more than the discontinued Taimar). The car's disappointing sales coincided with the early 1980s recession in the UK, and the result was that TVR was again on the brink of financial collapse. In December 1981, Martin Lilley transferred control of the company to wealthy businessman and TVR customer Peter Wheeler.

=== Wheeler ownership ===
Peter Wheeler, a chemical engineer who had specialised in manufacturing components for the oil industry bought TVR in 1981. Under Wheeler, TVR moved away from naturally aspirated and forced induction V6 engines to large V8 engines, namely the Rover V8. In that time, engine capacity grew from 3.5 to 5 litres. In 1988, TVR sourced a 5.0 litre Holden V8 through Tom Walkinshaw at Holden Special Vehicles. The engine was installed in the TVR White Elephant, a prototype car built for Wheeler by John Ravenscroft. The Holden powered TVR White Elephant was later superseded by the Rover V8 powered Griffith prototype.

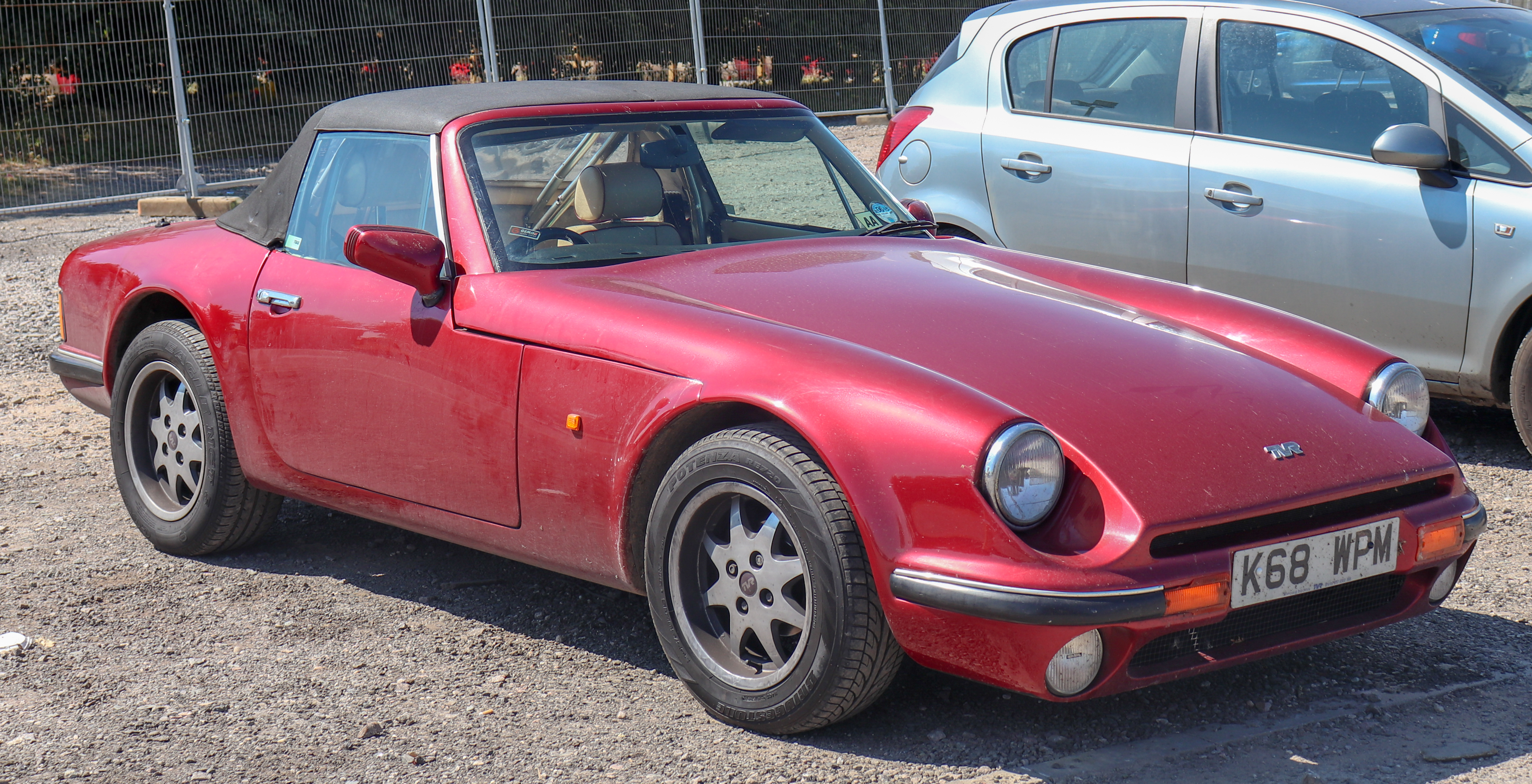
TVR 290S

With the TVR S Series, first produced in 1986, Wheeler re-introduced the traditional design elements from the M-series. This became a great success for the company, and he followed up by introducing a number of new and bold body designs including the Chimaera, Griffith, Cerbera, Tuscan, Tamora, T350, Typhon and Sagaris.

In the 1990s, TVR modified a number of Rover V8s, but subsequently an in-house engine design was developed. The AJP8 engine, a lightweight alloy V8, was developed by engineering consultant Al Melling along with John Ravenscroft and Peter Wheeler (hence the AJP initials). The new engine was originally destined for the Griffith and Chimaera models, but development took longer than expected and eventually became available in the Cerbera and the Tuscan race car.

Wheeler subsequently directed the design of a straight-six derivative of the AJP8 that would be cheaper to produce and maintain than the eight. This engine, designed initially by Al Melling and then significantly altered before final production by John Ravenscroft of TVR, became known as the TVR Speed Six engine, and, with the exception of the Cerbera (which could be specified with the AJP8), powered all the late model TVRs.

=== Smolensky ownership ===
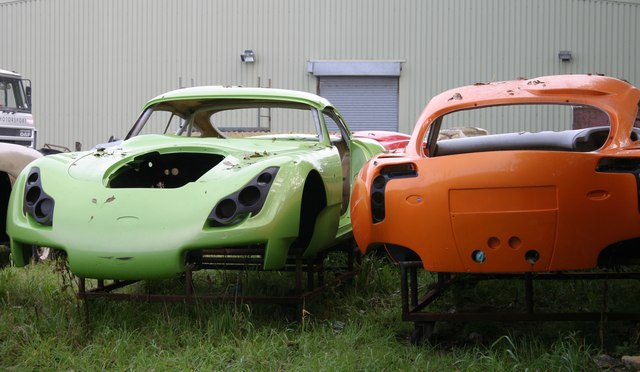
Unused TVR body shells, sitting outside of the closed Blackpool factory

In July 2004, Nikolay Smolensky bought the company from Wheeler. Despite his Russian nationality, Smolensky said he intended TVR to remain a British company.

In April 2006, responding to falling demand and with production rumoured to have dropped from 12 cars a week to 3 or 4, TVR laid off 300 of its staff members. At the same time, the firm announced plans to move to updated facilities in the Squires Gate district of Blackpool, citing impending expiry of the lease of the current factory in late 2006, where owner Peter Wheeler was said to be planning to build a housing estate.

In October 2006, Smolensky announced that body production and final assembly for TVR would move to Turin with only engine production remaining in the UK. In protest at this and to show support for the workers, a large number of TVR owners paraded through central London on 26 November 2006. Dubbed "London Thunder", it was also an attempt at the official world record for the biggest one-marque convoy on record.

By December 2006, it emerged that Smolensky had split TVR into a number of different companies: the brand and intellectual property rights had been transferred to a core Smolensky company; TVR Motors held the licence to the brands and intellectual property in the UK, as well as sales and marketing of the brand; TVR Power, the automotive parts business, had been sold to outside investors; and Blackpool Automotive which held the factory and manufacturing assets.

On 13 December 2006, Smolensky and production director Mike Penny resigned as directors of Blackpool Automotive, being replaced by Smolensky's UK personal assistant Roger Billinghurst and 25-year-old Austrian Angelco Stamenkov. By 24 December, Blackpool Automotive was in administration.

On 22 February 2007, it was revealed that Smolensky was once again the owner of the company, having been the highest bidder. On 8 October 2007, it was reported that Smolensky was still in control of the company and was hoping to restart production, with a target of 2,000 cars to be sold in 2008. and on 11 July TVR announced the relaunching of the Sagaris as the Sagaris 2, at its new centre near Wesham in Lancashire, though this did not happen and the company took no action for another two years.

In June 2010, German manufacturer Gullwing, a specialist German firm which held a minority share in TVR, said they would start producing a new car from September 2010. Boss Juergen Mohr said "Having been a TVR owner, I think this will be the best TVR ever." He also confirmed the company was planning new models, possibly with alternative drivetrains. "I can imagine everything, even electric-powered cars," Mohr said.

=== Current ownership ===
On 6 June 2013, it was reported that Nikolay Smolensky had sold his entire ownership of TVR to TVR Automotive Ltd, a UK company led by Les Edgar and John Chasey.

To coincide with the 2014 Classic Car Show, TVR announced a TVR Genuine Parts initiative to guarantee continuity of supply of parts for classic TVRs and the formation of a new company TVR Parts Ltd which is exclusively licensed to sell genuine parts worldwide, taking over the last stock remaining when the factory closed and the previous TVR parts business operations of Racing Green, Clever Trevor and Multipart Solutions. This was augmented the following year with the purchase of the parts business of David Gerald/Classic World Racing who had held the licence for pre 1980's TVRs.

On 3 June 2015, it was revealed that development of the new car had been underway for more than a year, with partners Gordon Murray and Cosworth, that would be launched in 2017, followed by additional models as part of a 10-year plan. The new car boasted an impressive specification, front engined, rear wheel drive, normally aspirated Cosworth V8 mated to a manual transmission, that caused it to be described as "God’s own sports car". Codenamed T37, deposits were taken in anticipation for delivery in 2017.

Further details of the engine were revealed on 7 October 2015 as being based on the 5.0 L Ford Coyote V8, with modifications by Cosworth including lighter flywheel, dry sump lubrication and unique engine management, to generate from 450 to 500 hp (336 to 373 kW; 456 to 507 PS), depending on the variant.

On 22 March 2016, the First Minister of Wales Carwyn Jones announced that TVR would build its factory in Ebbw Vale adjacent to the Circuit of Wales, creating 150 jobs, with TVR also receiving an undisclosed investment from the Welsh Government.

On 5 June 2017, it was announced the first public viewing and launch of the car would take place at the Goodwood Revival on 8 September 2017, to coincide with the marque's 70th anniversary year. On 8 September 2017, at the Goodwood Revival, the TVR Griffith was unveiled, featuring designwork by Gordon Murray, a 5.0 L Ford Cosworth V8 engine, and a carbon fibre ground effect chassis.

It was announced in January 2018 that the Welsh Government had previously acquired a minority 3% stake in TVR in early 2016, following independent and specialist due diligence, for the sum of £500,000. With this share purchase, it also provided a £2 million repayable commercial loan to the company, alongside a private sector lender, Fiduciam. According to the Welsh Government, the minority stake will "ensure the Welsh tax payer will benefit from the company's successes".

In June 2020, Autocar reported that TVR was owed more than £8.23 million from debtors, and has net assets slightly exceeding £2.1 million. TVR needed to pay off a £2 million loan from the Welsh government and a £3 million loan from financial firm Fiduciam. To fulfill its obligations and put the Griffith into production, TVR launched a £25m bond on Euronext Dublin, Ireland's main stock exchange, through Irish firm Audacia Capital. In January 2021, Fiduciam granted TVR a new £2 million loan through the UK's Coronavirus Business Interruption Loan Scheme.

In November 2021, TVR announced a joint venture with Ensorcia Metals, a lithium mining company to both fund production on the Griffith and ensure the supply chain for TVR's future battery requirements.

In April 2022, TVR announced that a multi-million pound investment by Ensorcia had taken place and it had repaid the debt owed to the Welsh Government. It was further announced TVR would become a sponsor for the 2021–22 Formula E rounds at Monaco and London to promote the forthcoming second generation of the Griffith. Autocar revealed in July 2022 that with the support of investment from Ensorcia, in addition to a Griffith EV there were plans for TVR to produce an electric SUV and saloon.

In December 2023, it was reported that TVR had lost exclusive rights to the Ebbw Vale factory. The Welsh Government subsequently offered the facility on the open market, stating that many different companies had shown interest in the facility.

In November 2025, it was reported that England-based boutique carmaker Charge Holdings had purchased TVR, and was set to reinvigorate the brand.

== Model list ==
Model	Production years	Engine	Displacement	Production figures
Trevor Wilkinson era
Jomar (Note: Not technically a TVR model; a TVR chassis bodied by Ray Saidel.)	1956–1959	Coventry Climax; Ford 100E Sidevalve	1098 cc 1172 cc	
TVR Open Sports / Coupe	1956–1957	Coventry Climax; Ford 100E Sidevalve; BMC B-Series	1098 cc 1172 cc 1489 cc	
TVR Grantura I	1958–1960	Coventry Climax FWA; Coventry Climax FWE; Ford 100E Sidevalve; BMC B-Series	1098 cc 1216 cc 1172 cc 1489 cc	100
TVR Grantura II	1960–1961	Coventry Climax FWE; Ford Kent 105E; BMC B-Series; BMC B-Series	1216 cc 997 cc 1489 cc 1588 cc	400
TVR Grantura IIa	1961–1962	Coventry Climax FWE; Ford Kent 105E; Ford Kent 109E; BMC B-Series; BMC B-Series	1216 cc 997 cc 1340 cc 1588 cc 1622 cc	400
TVR Grantura III	1962–1963	BMC B-Series	1622 cc	90
TVR Grantura III 1800	1963–1965	BMC B-Series	1798 cc	
TVR Grantura 1800S	1964–1966	BMC B-Series	1798 cc	90
TVR Trident	1965	Ford Windsor V8	4727 cc	
TVR Griffith 200	1963–1964	Ford Windsor V8	4727 cc	300
TVR Griffith 400	1964–1967	Ford Windsor V8	4727 cc	300
Martin Lilley era
TVR Grantura IV 1800S	1966–1967	BMC B-Series	1798 cc	90
TVR Tuscan V8	1967–1970	Ford Windsor V8	4727 cc	28 V8 and 27 V8SE
TVR Tuscan V6	1969–1971	Ford Essex V6	2994 cc	101
TVR Vixen S2	1968–1969	Ford Kent	1599 cc	438
TVR Vixen S3	1970–1972	Ford Kent	1599 cc	168
TVR Vixen 1300	1971–1972	Triumph I4	1296 cc	15
TVR Vixen 2500	1971–1972	Triumph I6	2498 cc	385
TVR Vixen S4	1972	Ford Kent	1599 cc	23
TVR 1600M	1972–1973; 1975–1977	Ford Kent I4	1599 cc	148
TVR 2500M	1972–1977	Triumph I6	2498 cc	947
TVR 3000M	1971–1979	Ford Essex V6	2994 cc	654
TVR 3000M Turbo	1975–1979	Ford Essex V6	2994 cc	20
TVR Taimar	1976–1979	Ford Essex V6	2994 cc	395 and 258 convertible
TVR Taimar Turbo	1976–1979	Ford Essex V6	2994 cc	30 and 13 convertible
TVR 3000S	1978–1979	Ford Essex V6	2994 cc	
TVR 3000S Turbo	1978–1979	Ford Essex V6	2994 cc	
TVR Tasmin 280i	1980–1984	Ford Cologne V6	2792 cc	118 and 862 convertible
TVR Tasmin 200	1981–1984	Ford Pinto I4	1993 cc	16 and 45 convertible
TVR Tasmin 350i	1983–1984	TVR/Rover V8	3528 cc	52 and 897 convertible
Peter Wheeler era
TVR 280i	1984–1987	Ford Cologne V6	2792 cc	118 and 862 convertible
TVR 350i	1984–1989	TVR/Rover V8	3528 cc	52 and 897 convertible
TVR 390SE	1984–1988	TVR/Rover V8	3905 cc	about 93 convertible
TVR 420SE	1986–1987	TVR/Rover V8	4228 cc	about 10 convertible
TVR 420SEAC	1986–1988	TVR/Rover V8	4228 cc	37
TVR 450SEAC	1988–1989	TVR/Rover V8	4441 cc	18
TVR 400SE	1988–1991	TVR/Rover V8	3948 cc	242 convertible
TVR 350SX	1989	TVR/Rover V8 + Sprintex Supercharger	3528 cc	9
TVR 400SX	1989	TVR/Rover V8 + Sprintex Supercharger	3948 cc	2
TVR 450SE	1989–1990	TVR/Rover V8	4441 cc	45 convertible
TVR 350SE	1990–1991	TVR/Rover V8	3947 cc	25
TVR 430SE	1991	TVR/Rover V8	4280 cc	3 convertible
TVR S	1986–1988	Ford Cologne V6	2792 cc	605
TVR S2	1989–1990	Ford Cologne V6	2933 cc	668
TVR S3(C)	1991–1992	Ford Cologne V6	2933 cc	887
TVR S4C	1993–1993	Ford Cologne V6	2933 cc	34
TVR V8S	1991–1993	TVR/Rover V8	3948 cc	410
TVR Griffith	1991–2002	TVR/Rover V8	3948 cc 4280 cc 4988 cc	2304
TVR Chimaera	1992–2001	TVR/Rover V8	3948 cc 4280 cc 4546 cc 4988 cc	5256
TVR Cerbera	1996–2005	AJP8 / Speed Eight	4185 cc 4475 cc	1196
TVR Cerbera	1996–2005	Speed Six	3996 cc	
TVR Tuscan	1999–2006	Speed Six	3605 cc 3996 cc	1677
TVR Tamora	2002–2006	Speed Six	3605 cc	356
TVR T350 (Targa & Coupe)	2002–2006	Speed Six	3605 cc	460
Nikolay Smolensky era
TVR Sagaris	2004–2006	Speed Six	3996 cc	211
TVR Typhon	2004–2006	Speed Six	3996 cc	3
Racing cars
TVR Tuscan Challenge (Note: Built exclusively for racing.)	1989	Rover V8/Speed Eight	4500 cc	43
TVR Cerbera Speed 12 (Note: Never went into production.)	1996–1998	Speed Twelve	7730 cc	3
TVR T400R	2000–2004	Speed Six	3996 cc	7

=== Gallery ===
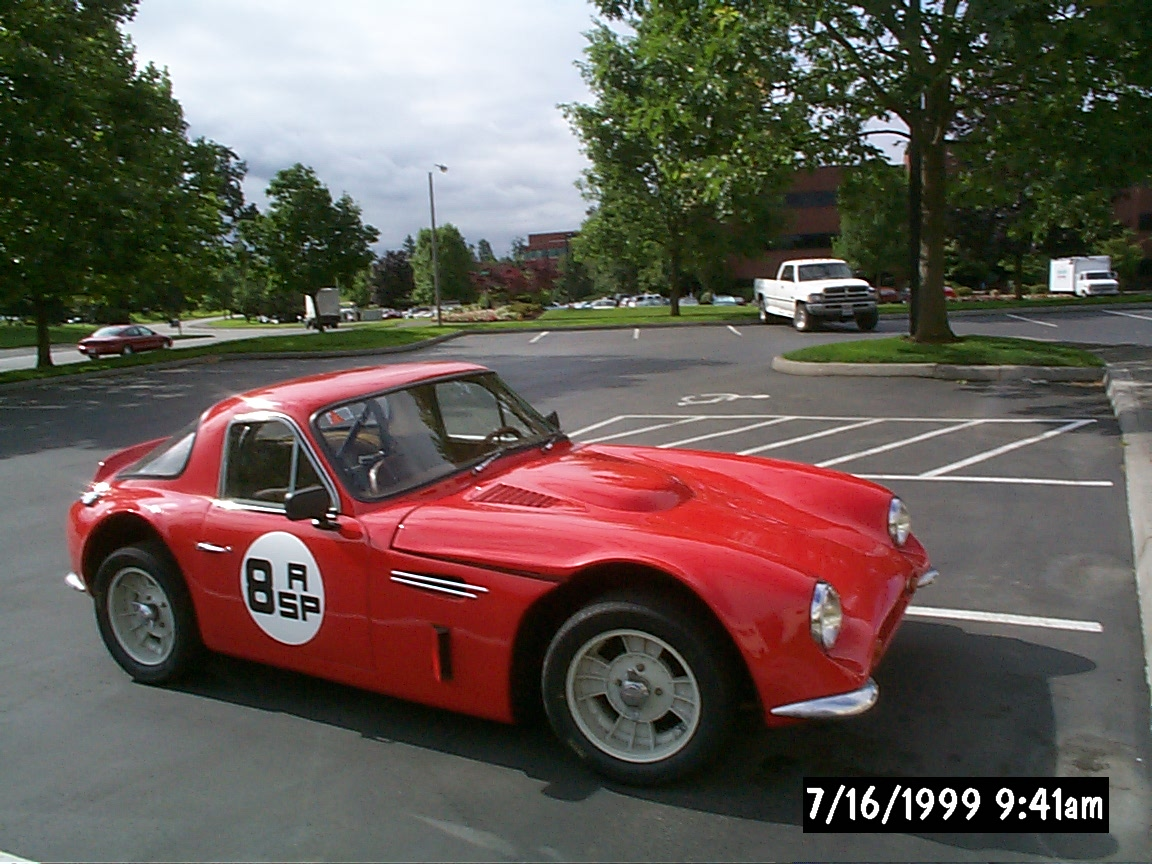
1966 Griffith 400 Original #55 of 59

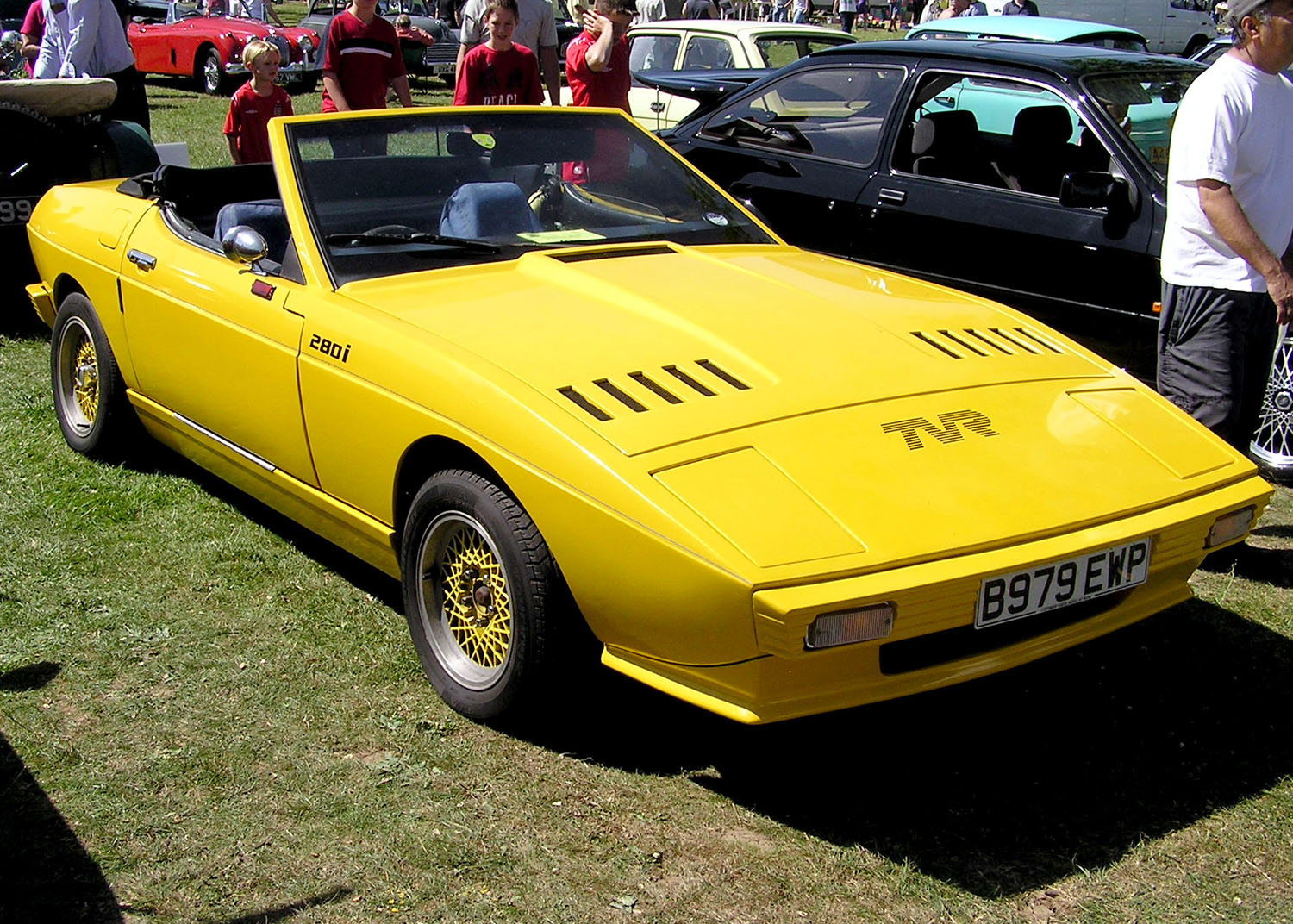
TVR 280i

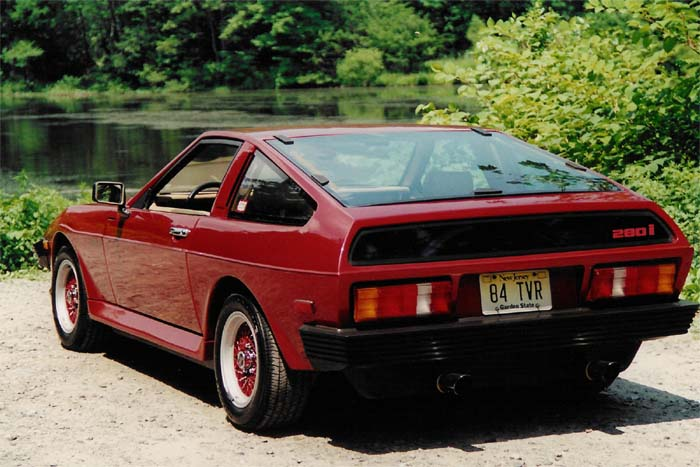
TVR 280i Coupe 1984

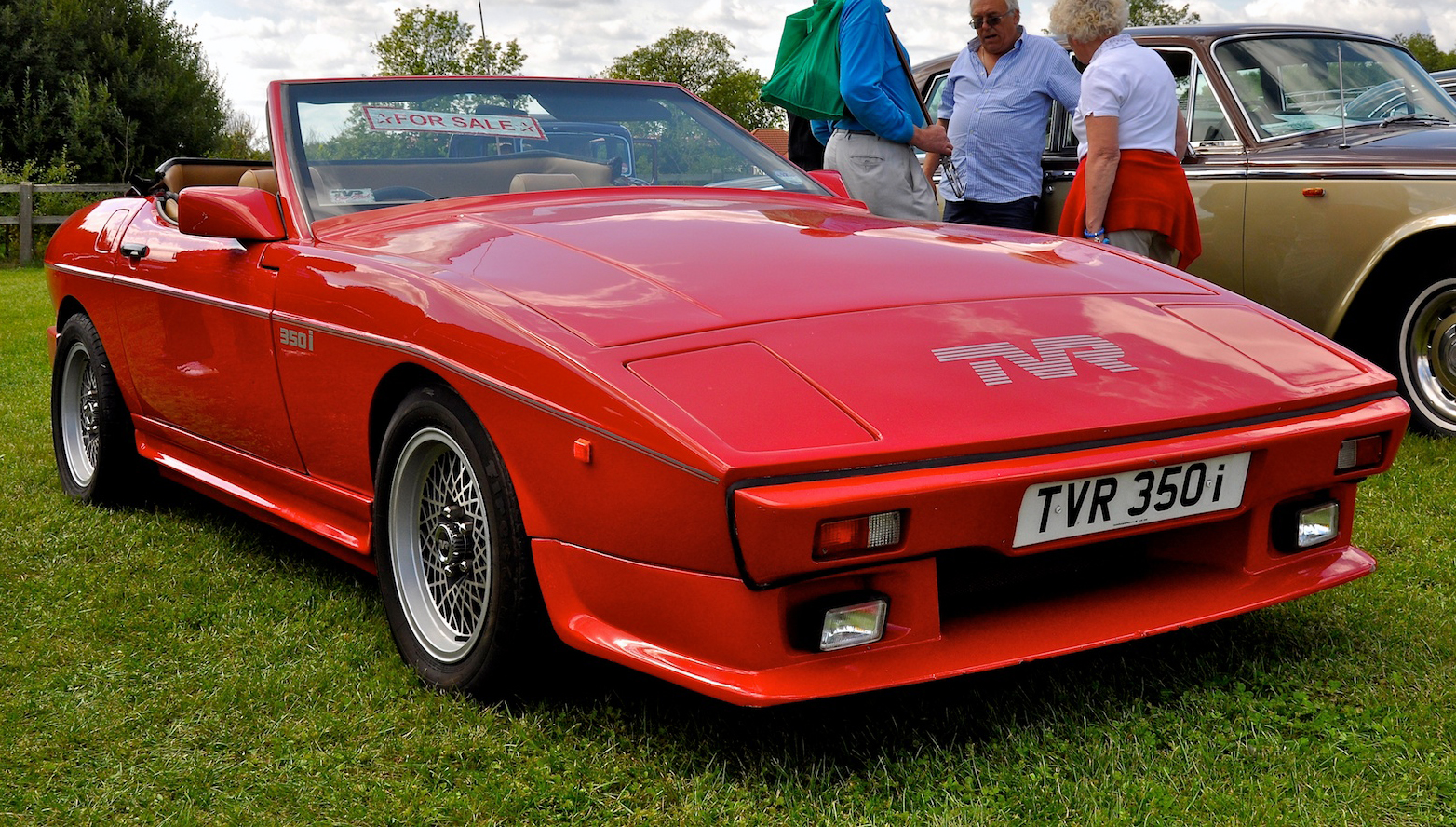
TVR 350i Series (1987)

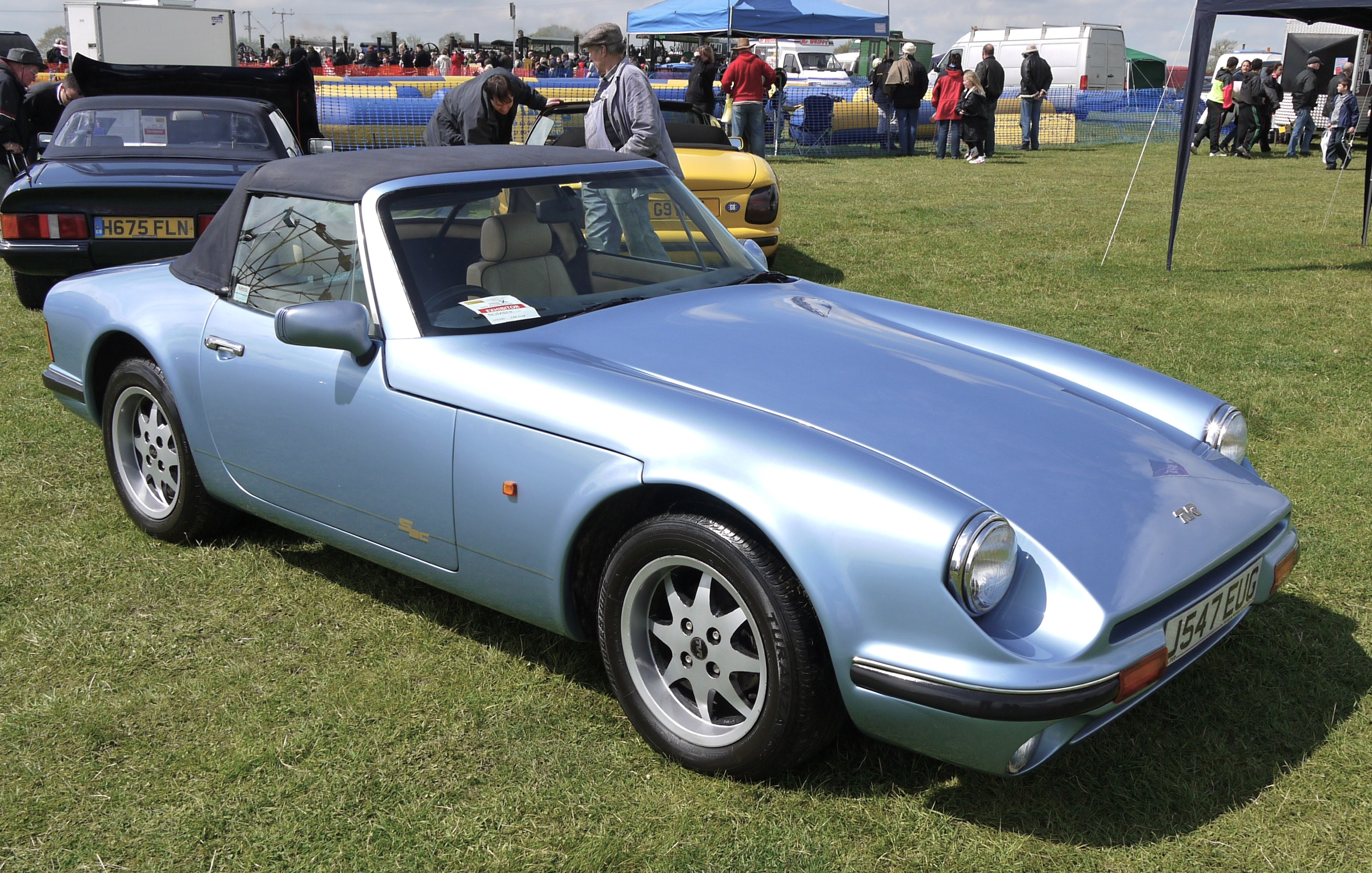
TVR S3c (1991)

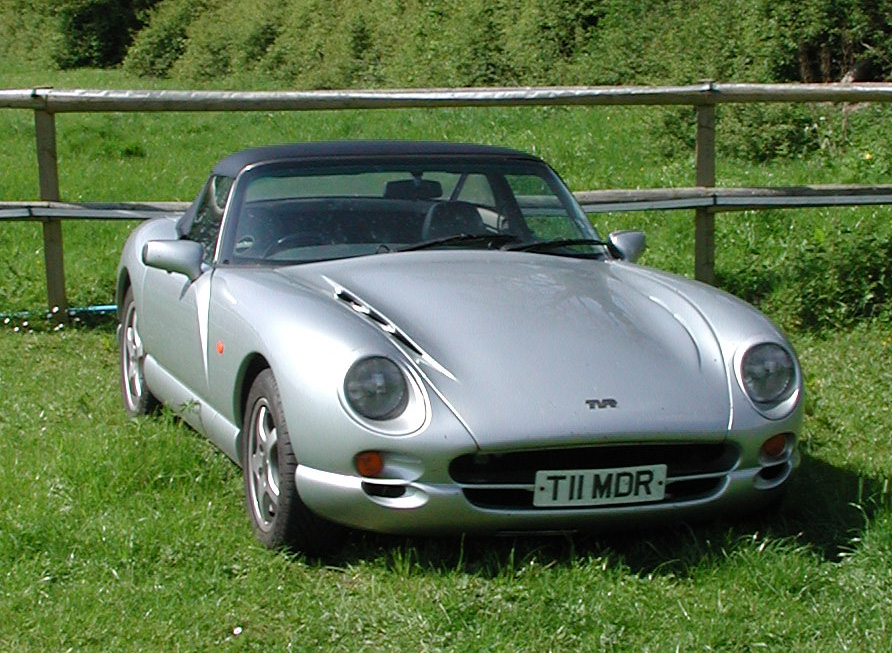
TVR Chimaera

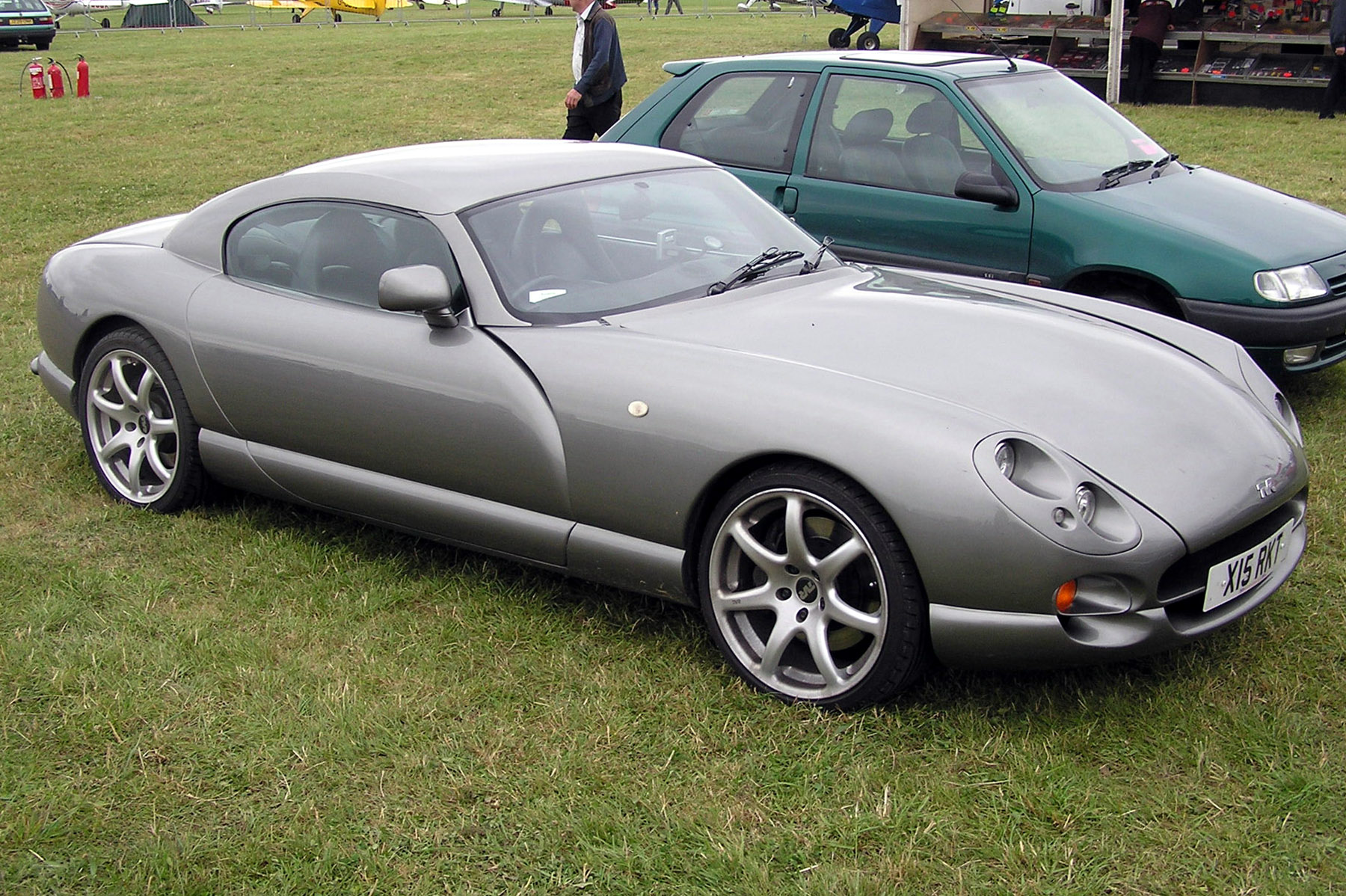
TVR Cerbera

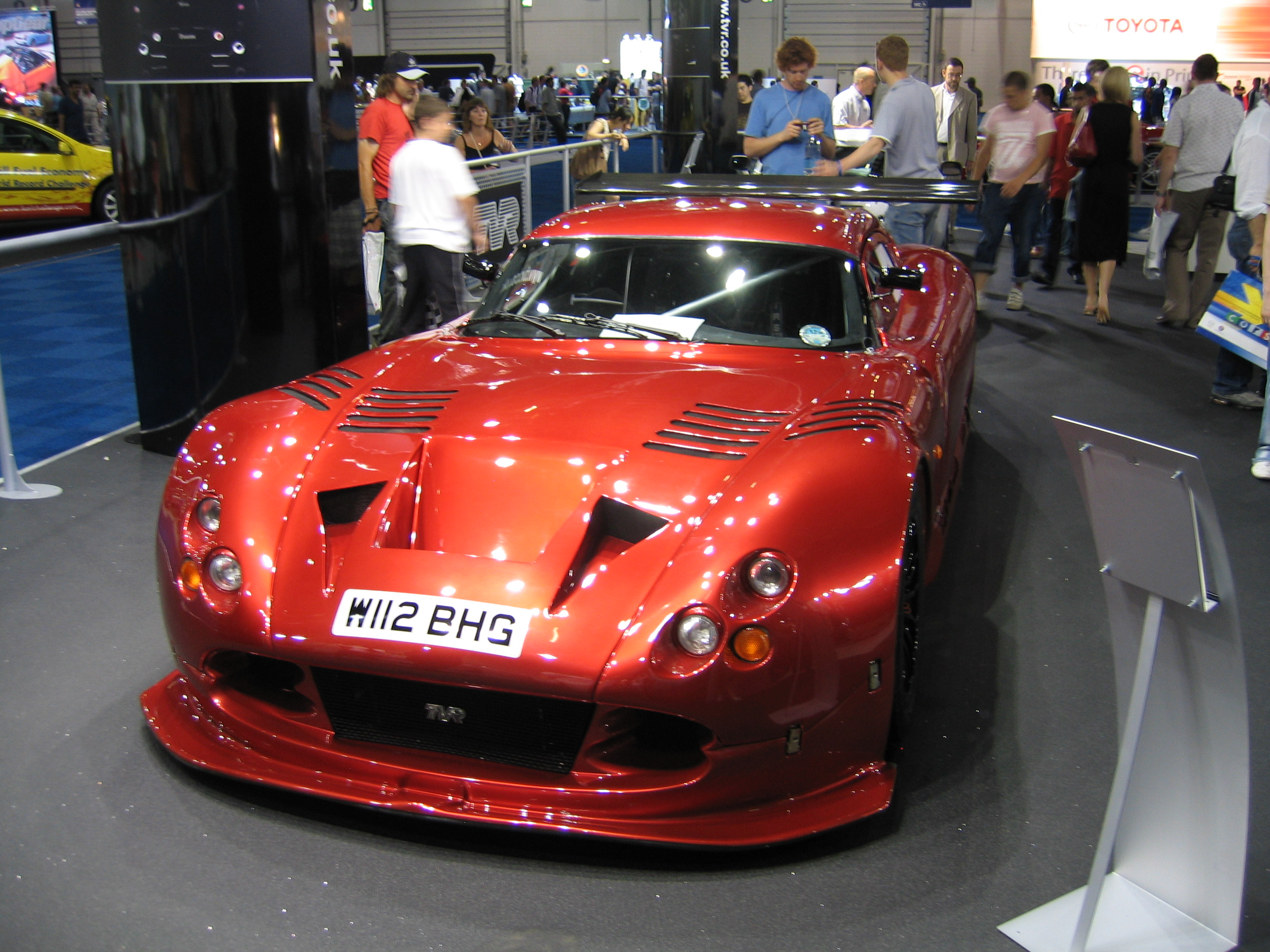
TVR Cerbera Speed 12

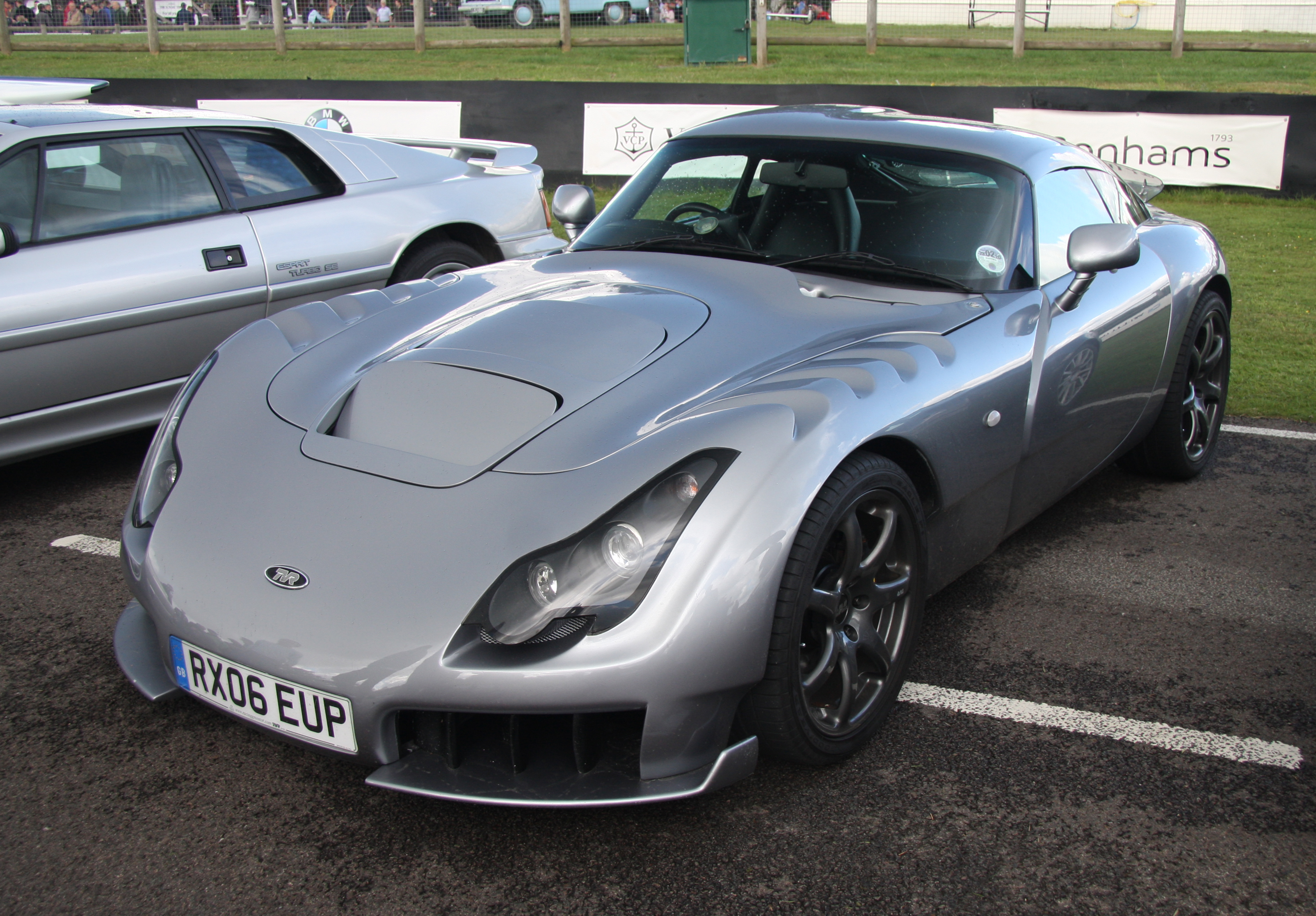
TVR Sagaris

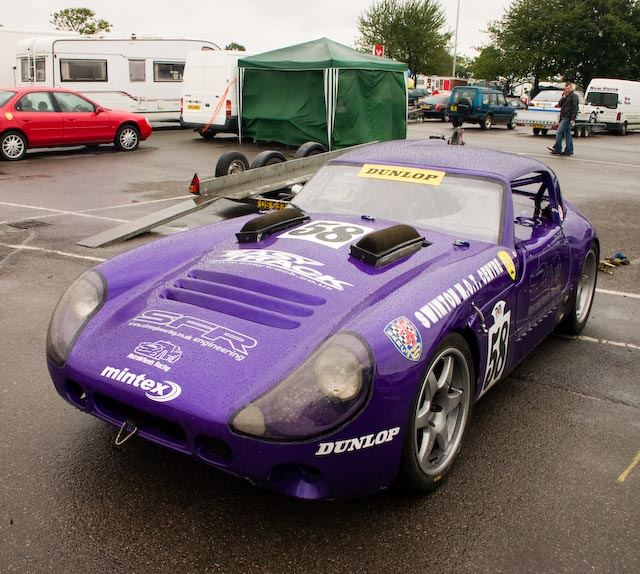
Tuscan Challenge racing car

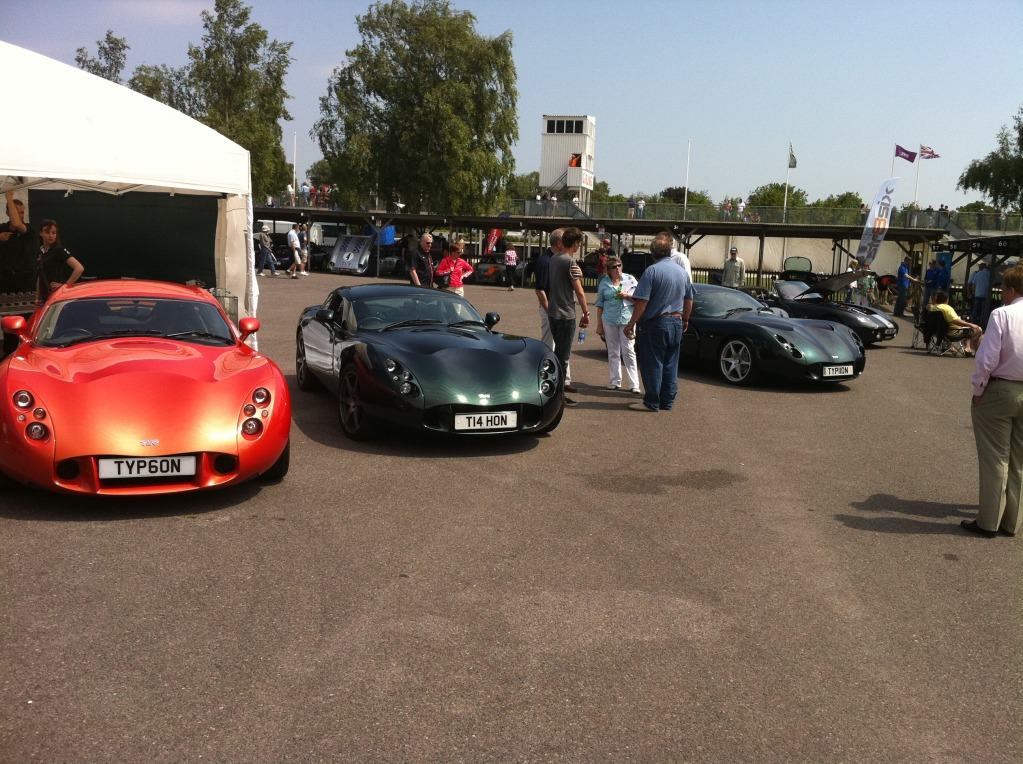
All three TVR Typhons together.

== See also ==
- Trident (car company)
- List of car manufacturers of the United Kingdom
