= Zante Parish =

Parish of Latvia

- parish of Latvia
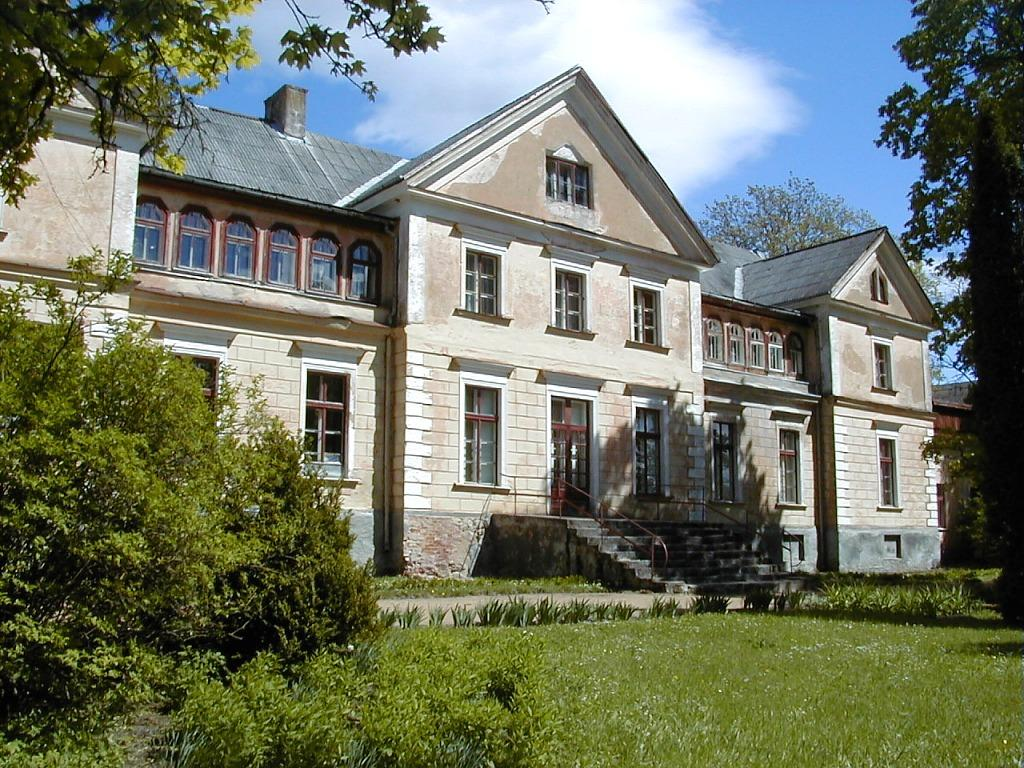
- Casa Senyorial de Zante, avui escola de primària.

- Coat of arms

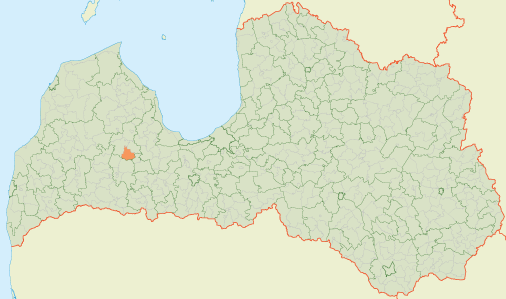
- Coordinates: 56°50′11″N 22°44′20″E
- Country: Latvia

Population (1 January 2026)
  - Total: 432

Zante parish (Latvian: Zantes pagasts) is an administrative unit of Tukums Municipality in the Courland region of Latvia.
