= Zante, California =

Unincorporated community in California, United States

- Unincorporated community
- Location within California Location within the United States
- Coordinates: 36°06′53″N 119°02′44″W
- Country: United States
- State: California
- County: Tulare
- Elevation: 417 ft (127 m)
- Time zone: UTC-8 (Pacific (PST))
  - Summer (DST): UTC-7 (PDT)
- Area code: 559
- GNIS feature ID: 253008

Zante is an unincorporated community in the San Joaquin Valley, within Tulare County, central California, United States.

Zante is 3.5 miles (5.6 km) north-northwest of Porterville.

History

The town is named for the Zante currant, a type of small raisin and a crop grown in the area.
