= Pirelli Cinturato =

Brand of car tyre

The Pirelli Cinturato is a Pirelli-developed car tyre that was the first example of a wrap-around radial tyre structure. It was used to good effect in motorsport, and most modern tyres are based upon the design. The five-times Formula One World Champion Juan Manuel Fangio called the Pirelli Cinturato "Extraordinary" and raced on it many times in the remainder of his career.

== History ==
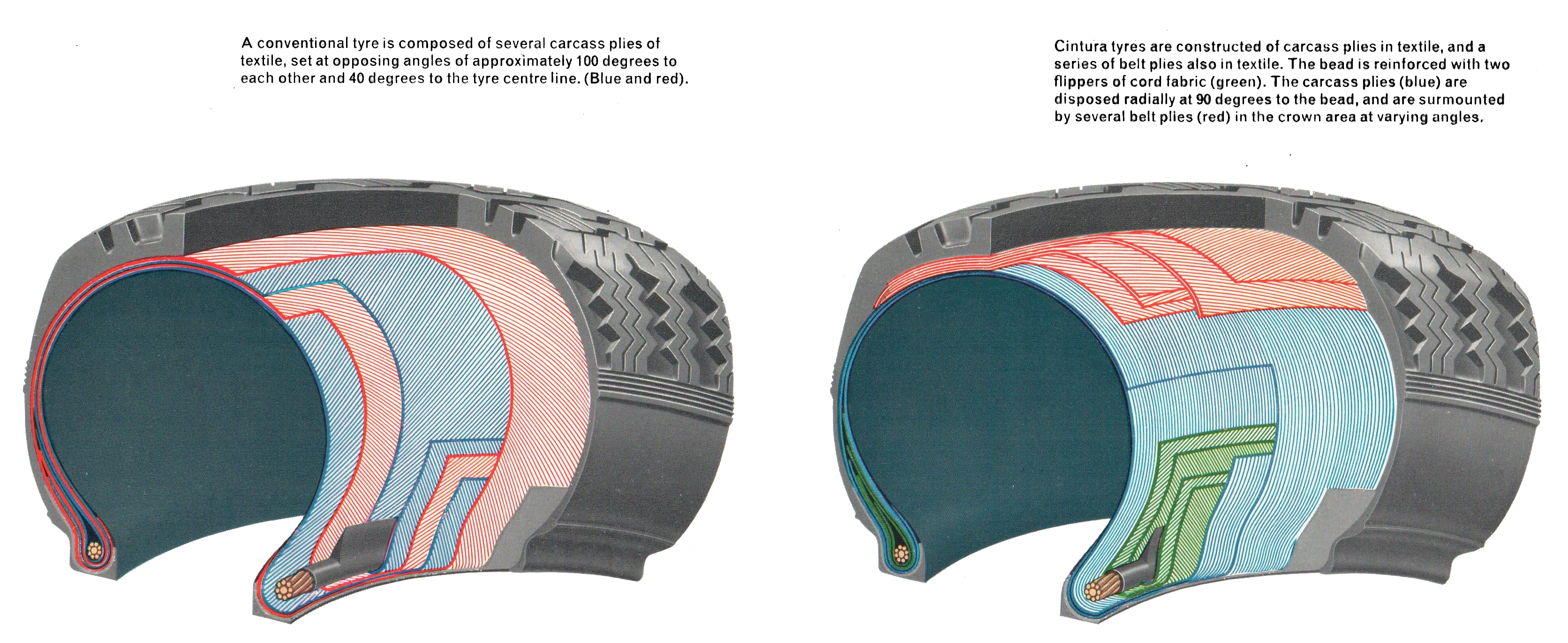
A comparison between a standard tyre of the time and the Pirelli Cinturato

First developed in 1952 under the name Pirelli Cintura, taking the name Cinturato in 1963, the tyre was composed of two or three carcass plies of cords laid at an angle of 90 degrees to the beads, and a belt of several plies laid circumferentially under the tread. Without a belt, the 90-degree plies would produce a casing which would greatly increase its sectional height on inflation. The belt, being inextensible, prevented the casing increasing in height when inflated, and the inflated tyre maintained almost the same dimensions as in the mould in which it went through vulcanisation. The belt was kept under tension, and the tread retained its flatter profile even when the tyre was inflated.

The Pirelli Cinturato may be compared to a wheel in which the rim is attached to the hub by means of fine spokes. The tread and belt are in effect the rim; the 90-degree or radial cord plies are the spokes; and the bead is the hub. The inextensible belt and the radial casing cords were the combined factors which gave the Cinturato tyre its special properties. The different geometric arrangement of the Cinturato carcass resulted in greater deformation (bulging) in the area of the tyre section which is under load, as opposed to previous radial tyres of the period. This caused no disadvantage and did not result in greater tyre casing fatigue. Rather than having the dynamic wave form behind the road contact area, it instead formed on the side wall, increasing stability whilst also allowing the heat generated by cornering and braking to be easily dispersed.

During the 1950s, 1960s and 1970s the Pirelli Cinturato was the original equipment tyre for many exotic Italian cars including Lamborghini, Lancia, Alfa Romeo, Maserati, Ferrari as well as for cars produced by other manufacturers worldwide, including MG, Rover Group, Volvo and Lotus Cars. Many other international car manufacturers such as Jaguar and Aston Martin that were still fitting crossply tyres as standard equipment fitted Pirelli Cinturato as their radial upgrade for customers that could afford it. By the end of 1968 Pirelli was exporting or directly manufacturing the Cinturato to or in as many as 137 countries worldwide.

The first Cinturato tread pattern was the CA67, which remains in production in sizes including 165HR14, 155HR15, 165HR15, 185VR15, and 185VR16. The CA67 was fitted to a range of vehicles, including the Ferrari 250 GT and Maserati 3500GT. Jaguar used this tread pattern on models such as the XK150, Series 1 E-Type, and Mark 2 saloons, although Pirelli tyres were not factory-fitted as original equipment on XK, E-Type, or Mark 2 models and were instead available as aftermarket replacements. Aston Martin offered the CA67 on models including the DB2, DB3, DB4, DB5, and DB6 when customers specified radial tyres. The CA67 also appeared on the Volvo P1800 driven by Roger Moore in the television series The Saint.

In 1964 Pirelli developed a new extra large high performance tyre with a 205 section and a new tread pattern that was designated CN72 HS (HS standing for High Speed). This new tyre again took the world of sportscars by storm and kept the Cinturato as the tyre of choice for sports cars such as Ferrari 330 GT 2+2, Iso Grifo, Lamborghini Miura and Maserati Ghibli. Once again Aston Martin also offered them as a radial alternative for their DBS.

Towards the end of 1968 the new tyre technology was low profile tyres. Pirelli were hot on the tail with their new CN36 which came out in 1969. The CN36 had a striking tread pattern and was a favourite for the likes of the Porsche 911, Ford Escort & Ford Cortina. 1971 would see Pirelli’s introduction of another high speed (HS) tyre with their CN12 Cinturato HS. These tyres were rated to be able to withstand the exceptional power of the Lamborghini Miura SV, and today their 205/70VR15 Pirelli Cinturato tyre holds a W speed rating (170 mph).

Cars which can use Pirelli Cinturato
Tyre Size	Cars
125SR12 CN54	Fiat 500; NSU Prinz; Autobianchi Bianchina
145/70SR12 CN54	Mini; Innocenti 90; Innocenti 650
145HR13 CA67	Alfa Romeo Alfasud; Austin A40, A40 Countryman, Allegro & Maestro; Austin-Healey Sprite; Citroen Visa; DAF 32; Fiat 850, 128 & X1/9; Ford Anglia, Cortina & Escort Mk.1; Lancia Delta; Lotus Elan; MG Midget; Morris Marina; Peugeot 104 & 205; Renault 5/Le Car, 6, 9, 12, 14 & 18; Simca 1000, 1100 & 1200; Talbot Samba; Sunbeam Horizon; Trimuph Herald, Spitfire, Acclaim; Vauxhall Nova & Astra; Volkswagen Polo & Golf
175/70VR13 CN36	Austin Maxi & Allegro; Audi 80; BMW 1602; Fiat 850, 131 & 124; Ford Orion, Cortina Mk.2, Capri & Escort; Hillman Avenger & Hunter; Humber Sceptre; Honda Accord & Prelude; Lotus Elan; Opel Kadett; Mazda 323; Renault 9, 11, 15, 18, 21 & Fuego; Sunbeam Alpine & Rapier; Talbot Sunbeam, Horizon & Carina; Toyota Corolla; Triumph Dolomite Sprint, Toledo, 1500, Vitesse, TR7 & Spitfire; Vauxhall Astra, Chevette, Magnum, Viva, Victor, Ventora & Firenza; Volkswagen Golf GTi, Scirocco, Passat & Jetta; Volvo 343
185/70VR13 CN36	Alfa Romeo Giuletta 1800; BMW 3 Series; Fiat 124, 125 & 131; Ford Capri, Cortina, Sierra, Escort RS; Jensen Healey; Lancia Monte Carlo; Lotus Eclat; Opel Ascona & Manta; Vauxhall VX4, Chevette & Cavalier
145HR14 CA67	Citroen BX; Lancia Fulvia; Morris Minor; Peugeot 204, 304 & 305; Renault 16; Wolesley 1500
165HR14 CA67	Alfa Romeo Alfetta, Giulia & Spider; Audi 100; Austin Cambridge & A60 Countryman; BMW 1800 & 2000; Citroen GS; Lancia Flavia & Fulvia; Mazda 1800; MG MGB; MG Magnette; Morris Oxford; Peugeot 504; Porsche 924; Riley 4/68 & 4/72; Rover 2200TC; Wolsley 16/60
185/70VR14 CN36	Low profile alternative of 165HR14 and can be fitted to Alfa Romeo Alfetta, Giulia & Spider; Audi 100; Austin Cambridge & A60 Countryman; BMW 1800 & 2000; Citroen GS; Lancia Flavia & Fulvia; Mazda 1800; MG MGB; MG Magnette; Morris Oxford; Peugeot 504; Porsche 924; Riley 4/68 & 4/72; Rover 2200TC; Wolsley 16/60
205/70VR14 CN36	Ferrari 208, 246, 308; Fiat Dino; BMW 730 & 731; Mercedes 280, 350, 380, 450 & 500
155HR15 CA67	Alfa Romeo Giulietta and Giulia; Lancia Flavia and Appia; Lotus Elite; MG MGA, TF & TD; Peugeot 403 and 404; Porsche 914; Saab 99; Triumph TR2 and TR3; Volkswagen Beetle
165HR15 CA67 & 165/70VR15 CN36	Alfa Romeo Giulietta Giardinetta; Austin Healey; Daimler SP250 Sport; Fiat 2300S Coupe; Gilbern; Lancia Flavia; MG MGA; MG MGC; MG TF; MG TD; MG YB; MG Magnette; Morgan 4/4; Morgan +4; Morris Oxford Traveller; Peugeot 403; Peugeot 404; Porsche 356; Porsche 912; Porsche 914; Porsche 911 (pre-1968); Triumph TR4; Triumph TR5; Triumph TR6; TVR Vixen; TVR Tuscan V6; VW Beetle; VW 1600; VW k70; VW 411; VW Karmann Ghia; Volvo Amazon; Volvo P1800
185VR15 CA67	Aston Martin DB4, DB5 and DB6; Jaguar E-type series 1 & 2 and Jaguar Mk1, Mk2 & S-type saloons; Daimler V8 saloon; Ferrari 250 GT and 250 GTE; Mercedes 220D; BMW 2600 and 3200; Citroen ID and DS; Morgan +8; Rover P4 and P5; Jensen CV8
185/70VR15 CN36	Austin-Healey 100, 100-6 & 3000; MGC; Porsche 911, 924 & 944; Triumph TR4, TR5 & Triumph TR6; Volvo 1800ES
205VR15 CN72	AC 428; Aston Martin DB6 MkII; Aston Martin DBS; Bentley Type 1 (1966-1973); Ferrari 330 GT 2+2; Ferrari 500 Superfast; Ferrari 365 and Ferrari 365 GT 2+2; Bizzarrini Iso; Rivolta and Grifo; Lamborghini 350GT; Lamborghini 400GT; Lamborghini Islero; Lamborghini Miura and Lamborghini Espada, Maserati 4200 Quattroporte; Maserati Mistral 68; Maserati Mexico; Maserati Ghibli; Maserati Sebring; Rolls-Royce Silver Shadow (1963-1973)
205/50VR15 P7	Porsche 911 Turbo (pre-1976); Dodge Shadow, Shelby CSX & Omni GLH-S
205/70VR15 CN12	Aston Martin DB4, DB5, DB6; Aston Martin MKII; Citroën SM; Daimler Sovereign; Daimler Double-Six; Ferrari 250; Jaguar XJ6; Jaguar XJ12; Jaguar XJS; Jaguar E-Type V12; Jensen Interceptor; Morgan Plus 8
215/60VR15 CN36	Porsche 911, 924 & 944
185VR16 CA67	Aston Martin 2-Litre Sports, DB2, DB2/4, DB Mark III, DB4 & DB4 GT Zagato; Jaguar XK120, XK140, XK150 and C-Type; BMW 2500 and 375; 1950s and early 60s Maserati and Ferrari; Bristol up to the 409 in 1967; AC Ace; Triumph Gloria and Renown; Riley RM and Pathfinder; Lea Francis up to 1954; Daimler DB18
165HR400 CA67	Alfa Romeo 1900, Alfa Romeo 2000, Alfa Romeo 2600, Lancia Aurelia, Lancia Flaminia & Ferrari 250 GT; Citroen Traction Avant, Citroen ID and Citroen DS

== Bibliography ==
- Pirelli (1964), Pattern of Progress Pirelli Cinturato, H. Hacker Ltd.
- Pirelli (March 1964), Fitment and pressure table for Cinturato car tyres, Mears Caldwell Hacker Ltd.
