= TVR M series =

TVR M Series
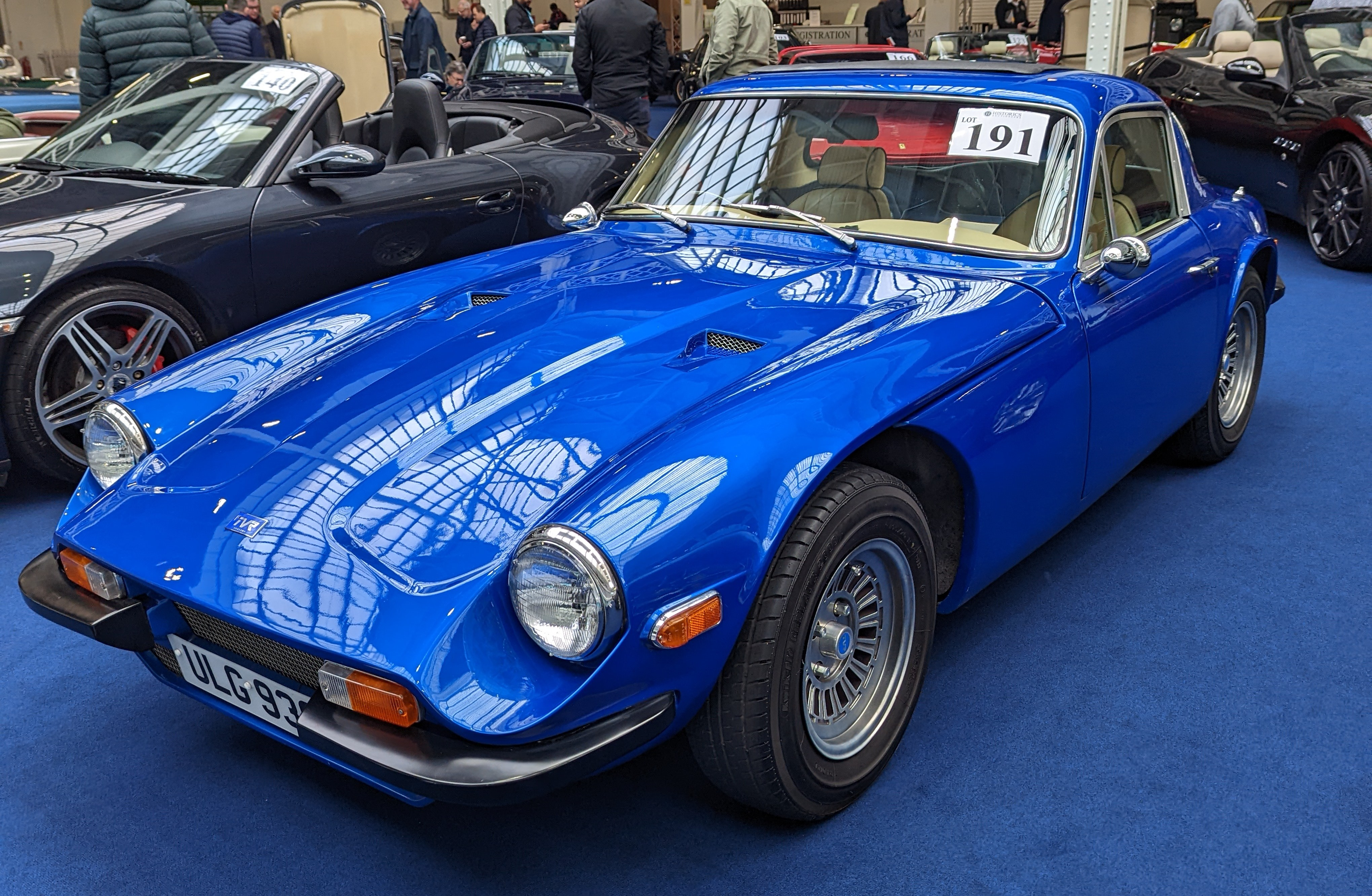

Overview
- Manufacturer: TVR
- Production: 1972–1979
- Assembly: United Kingdom: Blackpool, England

Body and chassis
- Class: Sports Car / Roadster
- Layout: FMR

Powertrain
- Engine: Ford Kent 1.6L I4; Triumph 2.5L I6; Ford Essex 3.0L V6

Dimensions
- Length: 155 in (3,937 mm)
- Width: 64 in (1,626 mm)
- Height: 47 in (1,194 mm) (coupe) or 44 in (1,118 mm) (roadster)
- Curb weight: 1,972 lb (894 kg) - 2,250 lb (1,020 kg)

Chronology
- Predecessor: TVR Vixen; TVR Tuscan (1967)
- Successor: TVR Tasmin

The TVR M series is a line of sports cars built by automaker TVR between 1972 and 1979. The series replaced the outgoing TVR Vixen and Tuscan models, and is characterized by a common chassis and shared body style. As with other TVR models before and since, the M-series cars use a front mid-engine, rear-wheel drive layout and body-on-frame construction. The bodies themselves were built from glass-reinforced plastic (GRP). The era of the M series is commonly associated with Martin Lilley who, together with his father, took ownership of the company on 30 November 1965.

The M series was regarded by contemporary reviewers as being loud and fast and having excellent roadholding. This came at the expense of unusual ergonomics, and heating and ventilation systems that were sometimes problematic.

The series includes the 1600M, 2500M, 3000M, 3000S, and Taimar, as well as turbocharged versions of the 3000M, 3000S, and Taimar. The first model to start production was the 2500M in March 1972, after being built as a prototype in 1971. A small number of 5.0 L Ford V8-powered cars were finished or converted by the TVR North America importer; these were sold as the 5000M. A total of 2,465 M-series cars were built over the nine years of production. Because of the hand-built and low-volume nature of TVR production, there are many small and often-undocumented variations between cars of the same model that arise due to component availability and minor changes in the build process.

The American market was financially very important to TVR, and Gerry Sagerman oversaw import and distribution of the cars within the United States from his facility on Long Island. Approximately thirty dealers sold TVRs in the eastern part of the country. John Wadman handled distribution of the cars in Canada through his business, JAG Auto Enterprises.

== Chassis ==
The backbone chassis for the M-series cars was designed by automotive engineer and dealer Mike Bigland in 1971. Bigland had been hired by Lilley after demonstrating a number of suspension and steering improvements he had made to a 1967 TVR Tuscan SE owned by one John Burton. The chassis Bigland designed was of a central-backbone layout with perimeter tubes. Both round- and square-section 14-gauge and 16-gauge steel tube was used in the construction, with the square sections used to allow easier joining of the frame to the body. To facilitate production of the new chassis, Lilley upgraded TVR's workshop with fixtures that allowed two welders to produce five units per week. During testing, Bigland drove the gold-painted prototype car between his own workshop in Halesowen and the TVR factory several times per week.

Unusual at the time, TVR offered a five-year guarantee against corrosion on the M-series chassis. Corrosion was prevented by leaving a film of oil from the manufacturing process on the metal, capping the ends of the tubes, and fastening components without driving fasteners through the tube walls.

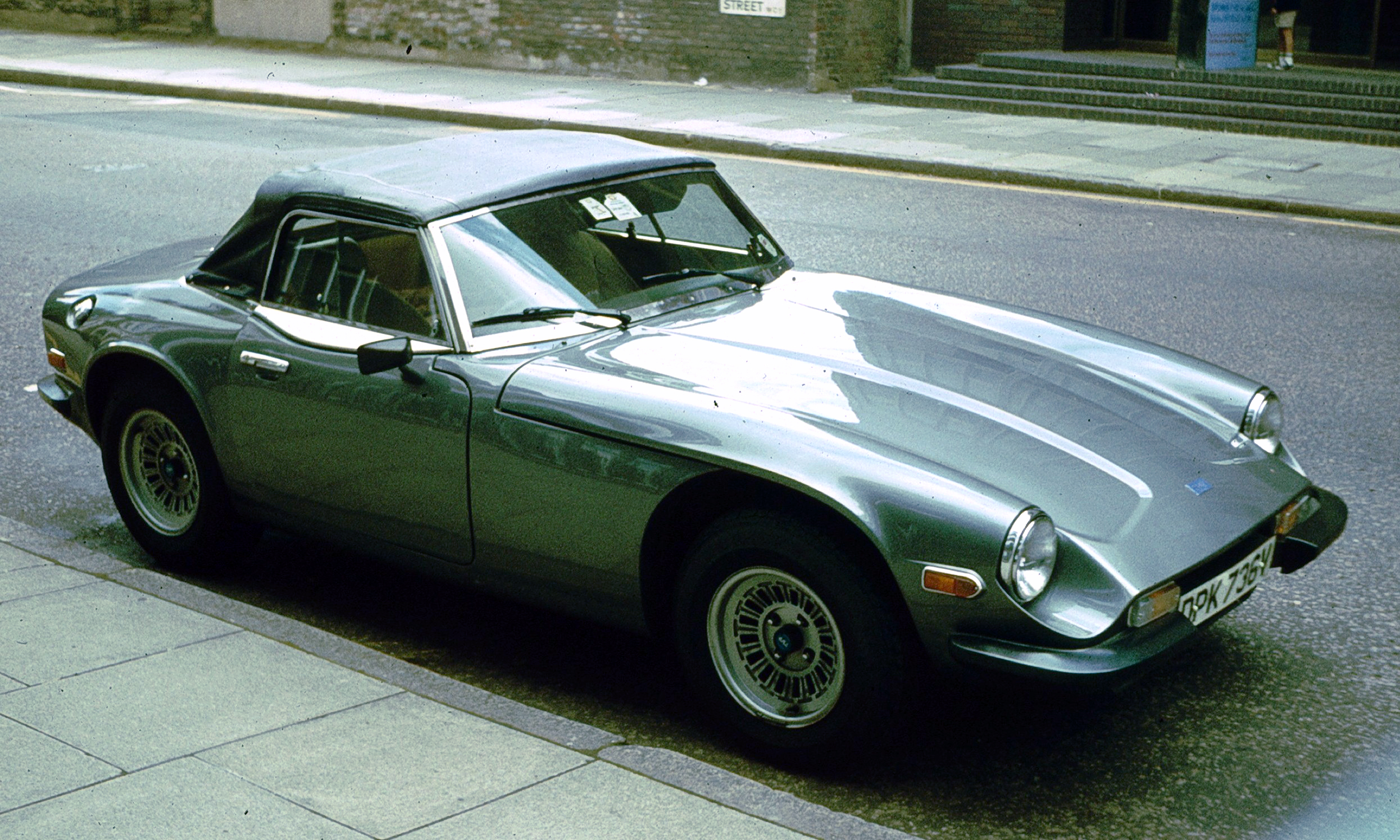
1979 TVR 3000S Convertible, with detachable sidescreens in place

The radiator selected for the M series was shallow enough to allow locating the spare wheel in front of the engine; this improved luggage space behind the seats (where the spare wheel had been stored on pre-M-series models) and also offered some additional crash protection for occupants. An M-series car was sent to the Motor Industry Research Association in 1971 for crash testing, and it was the only vehicle that remained steerable after a 30 mph (48 km/h) front-end collision with a concrete wall. Indeed, the engine remained in position through the impact, the doors were still openable, and the steering column had actually moved forward (away from the driver.) This last fact almost caused the MIRA officials to require that the car be re-tested, as they presumed that such as result was not possible and was a result of a fault with their measurement instruments. Mike Bigland was able to demonstrate to the officials that the result was legitimate, and approval was granted.

The car's suspension was via double wishbones and coil springs front and rear. Although the wishbones and aluminum hub carriers were an original TVR design, many components on the cars were sourced from other manufacturers. The brakes, which were 11-inch discs at the front and 9-inch drums at the rear, came from the Triumph TR6. Steering on all cars was via rack-and-pinion, with the rack manufactured by Alford & Alder. The steering column was a British Leyland part. Some components — such as the differential carrier and front suspension wishbones — were unique to TVR and manufactured in their own welding shop.

Because of production overlap between the M-series cars and earlier models, some earlier models were built with the pre-M bodywork over an M-series chassis. This includes the last series of the TVR 2500 (comprising ninety-six cars; known in the US as the Vixen 2500 and not to be confused with the 2500M), all twenty-three Vixen S4s, and the final six examples of the TVR 1300 (which used the 1296 cc Standard SC engine from the Triumph Spitfire). The very last 1300 was also built with M-series bodywork, although it was not officially given the "1300M" designation.

== Body and trim ==
The M-series body was an evolution of the outgoing Vixen and Tuscan body. The doors, roof, forward bulkhead, and front windscreen were kept the same, leaving the bonnet and rear end to be restyled. At the start of M-series production, the fibreglass sections were baked at 140 °F (60 °C) after being moulded, then given an etch coat, six coats of primer, and three coats of nitrocellulose lacquer paint. Partway through production, the paint shop changed to a two-pack acrylic paint process. Graphic artist John Bailie designed the contrasting side stripe that was first introduced on the turbocharged cars in 1976 (and was available by customer request on all M-series cars in the following years.)

Bigland styled the car's bonnet while Lilley styled the rear with the help of Joe Mleczek, who had been with the company since 1959 and who had experience in working with GRP. Lilley also designed the interior and trim. Initially, the 1600M, 2500M, and 3000M all featured vents on the bonnet and front wings. By 1975, the 1600M and 3000M were being built without the vents but they were retained on the 2500M due to its tendency to run hot.

Many components were sourced from Ford models, including the Consul windscreen that was used on all M-series variants apart from the 3000S. The taillights were initially the Ford Cortina Mark II units as had been used on late Vixens and Tuscans, mounted upside down. These were later replaced by Triumph TR6 lights, which were then replaced with smaller square Lucas lamps in a 1976 facelift which also affected the front. Multiple styles of alloy wheels were offered on the cars over the course of production, including a design by Wolfrace and the "T-slot" design, which was created by Mike Bigland and manufactured by Telcast. Chrome-plated steel bumpers, adapted from those used on the Triumph 2000, were used until September 1974, at which point they were replaced with black foam rubber bumpers.

The corduroy-covered seats used in the M series were finished by Callow & Maddox Ltd., a car trimming and upholstering company then located in Exhall, Coventry. The foam padding used in the seats has a tendency to crumble and disintegrate, which prompts some owners to find suitable replacements. Most aftermarket seats will not fit in the glassfibre tub; only unusually low and narrow seats (such as those from the 1984 to 1988 Pontiac Fiero) can accommodate the car's bodyshell. During M-series production, TVR was dealing with more than two hundred external suppliers, and stored approximately three months' worth of components to reduce sensitivity to outside production variation.

After production of the M series ended, TVR sold the production rights and tooling for many M-series components (including GRP bodies) to David Gerald TVR Sportscars Ltd.

== 1600M ==
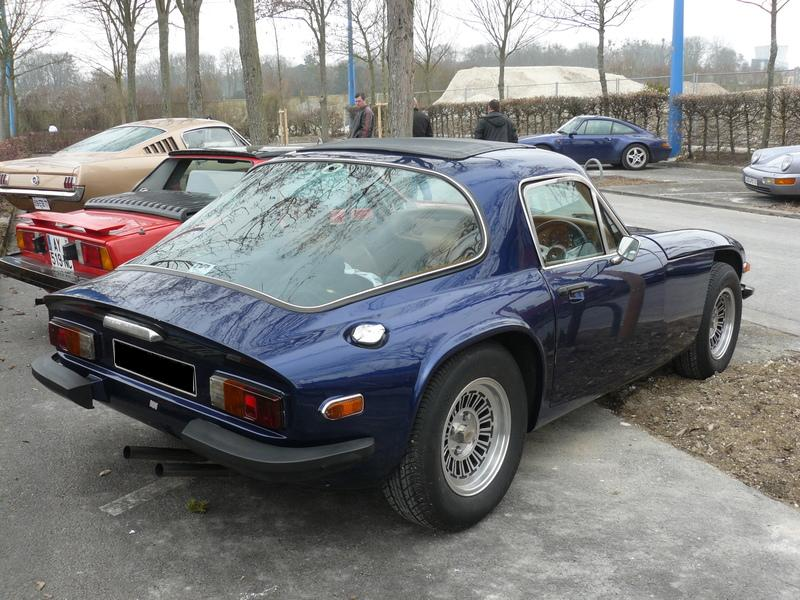
1977 TVR 1600M, with the third and last taillight configuration

The 1600M, introduced in June 1972, used the 1.6L Ford Kent engine as found in the Ford Capri GT. Power was transmitted via a four-speed Ford gearbox and a Triumph Spitfire differential. The 1600M was discontinued in April 1973, only to be revived for the 1975 model year to meet increased demand for fuel-efficient vehicles in the wake of the 1973 oil crisis. In October 1972, it cost £1980. A total of 148 were built by the time production finally ended in 1977.

=== Specifications ===
- Top speed - 105 mph (169 km/h)
- Acceleration:

0-60 mph (97 km/h): 10.4 seconds
30-50 mph in top: 10.4 seconds
50-70 mph in top: 9.5 seconds

- Engine displacement - 1,598cc (bore and stroke: 81 mm (3.2 in) x 77.6 mm (3.1 in))
- Engine type - Normally aspirated inline-four
- Compression ratio - 9.0:1
- Fueling - Twin-choke Weber carburetor
- Peak power - 86 bhp (64 kW; 87 PS) at 5,500 rpm
- Peak torque - 92 lb⋅ft (125 N⋅m) at 4,000 rpm
- Transmission - 4-speed manual
- Number built - 148
- Chassis numbers:

2288FM through 2623FM (1972-73)
3384FM through 3938FM (1975-77)

=== Yearly production ===
Year	Quantity
1972	57
1973	11
1974	–
1975	50
1976	29
1977	1
Total	148

== 2500M ==
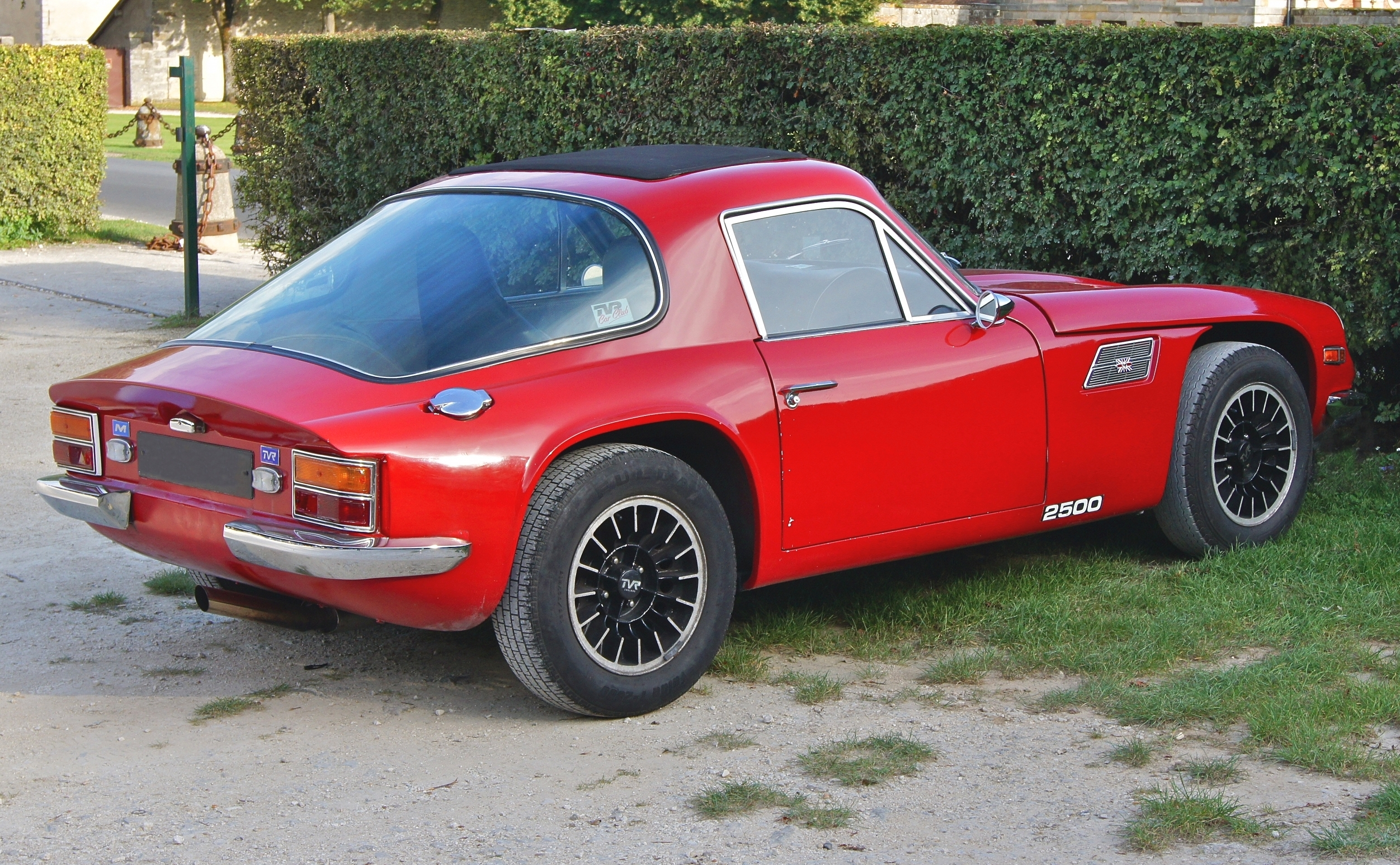
Rear view of 1972 2500M, showing the Cortina Mark II taillights of the early cars

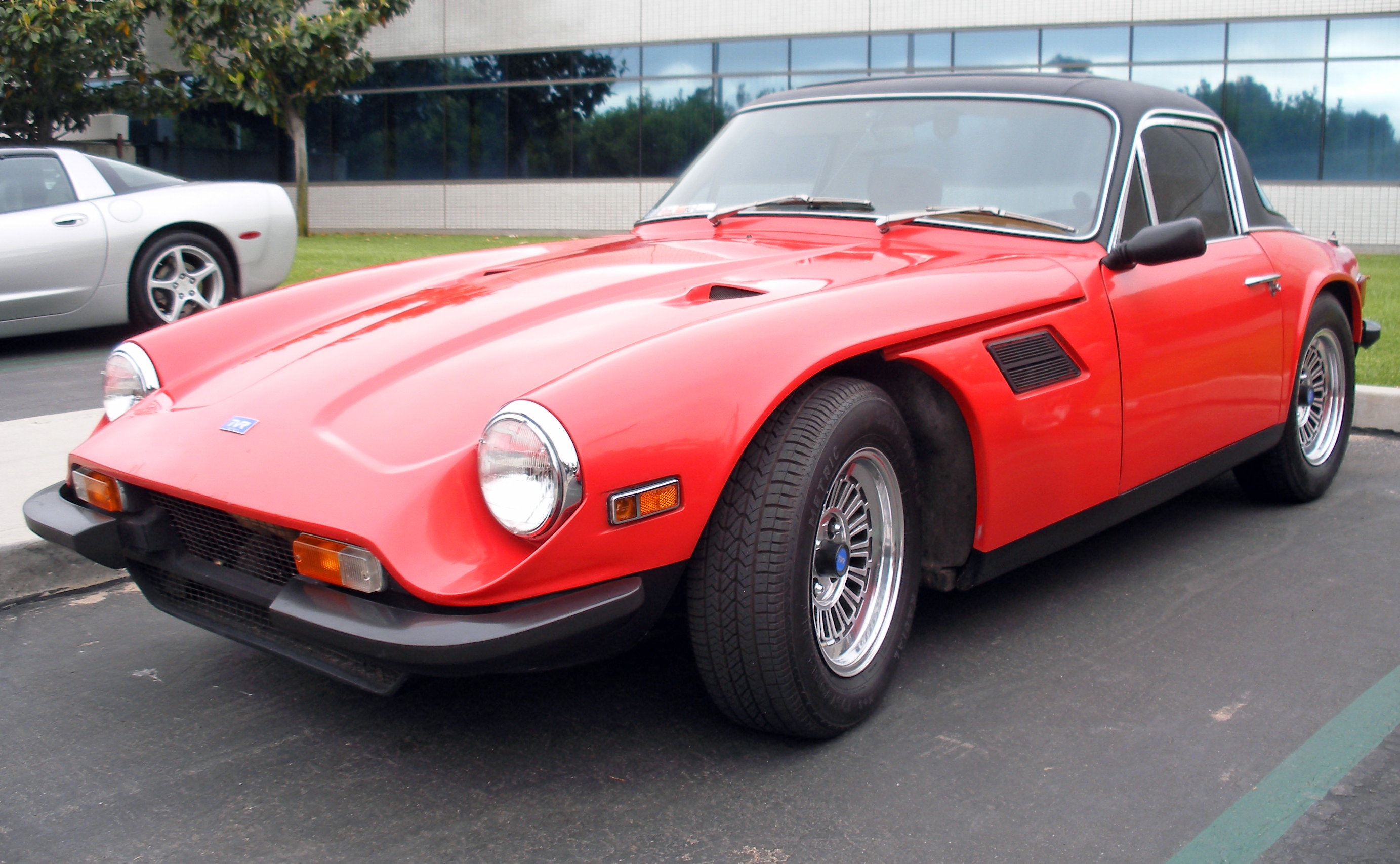
A circa 1974 2500M

As the United States was always an important market for TVR, the 2500M used the 2.5-litre straight-six engine from the Triumph TR6 due to that engine having been previously certified for US emissions regulations. Also borrowed from the TR6 were its gearbox, differential, and front suspension uprights.

The 2500M was only offered in the UK home market until 1973, after which point it was no longer sold there due to the availability of the 3000M, which featured significantly better performance. Later, with the introduction of the TR7, Triumph stopped production of the 2.5 L TR6 engine, and TVR discontinued the 2500M completely when supplies of the engine were exhausted in 1977. The 2.5-litre Triumph engine had an inherent fault when fitted to the 2500M: it would continually over heat in traffic or at high revs.

In October 1972, the 2500M cost £2151. Between 1972 and 1977, 947 2500Ms were sold.

=== Specifications ===
- Top speed - 109 mph (175 km/h)
- Acceleration - 0-60 mph (97 km/h): 9.3 seconds
- Engine displacement - 2498 cc (bore and stroke: 74.7 mm (2.9 in) x 95 mm (3.7 in))
- Engine type - Normally aspirated straight six
- Compression ratio - 8.5:1
- Fueling - Twin Zenith carburettors
- Peak power - 106 bhp (79 kW; 107 PS) at 4,900 rpm
- Peak torque - 133 lb⋅ft (180 N⋅m) at 3,000 rpm
- Transmission - 4-speed manual, optional overdrive
- Number built - 947
- Chassis numbers:

2090T (prototype)
2240TM through 4094TM

== 3000M, Taimar, and 3000S ==
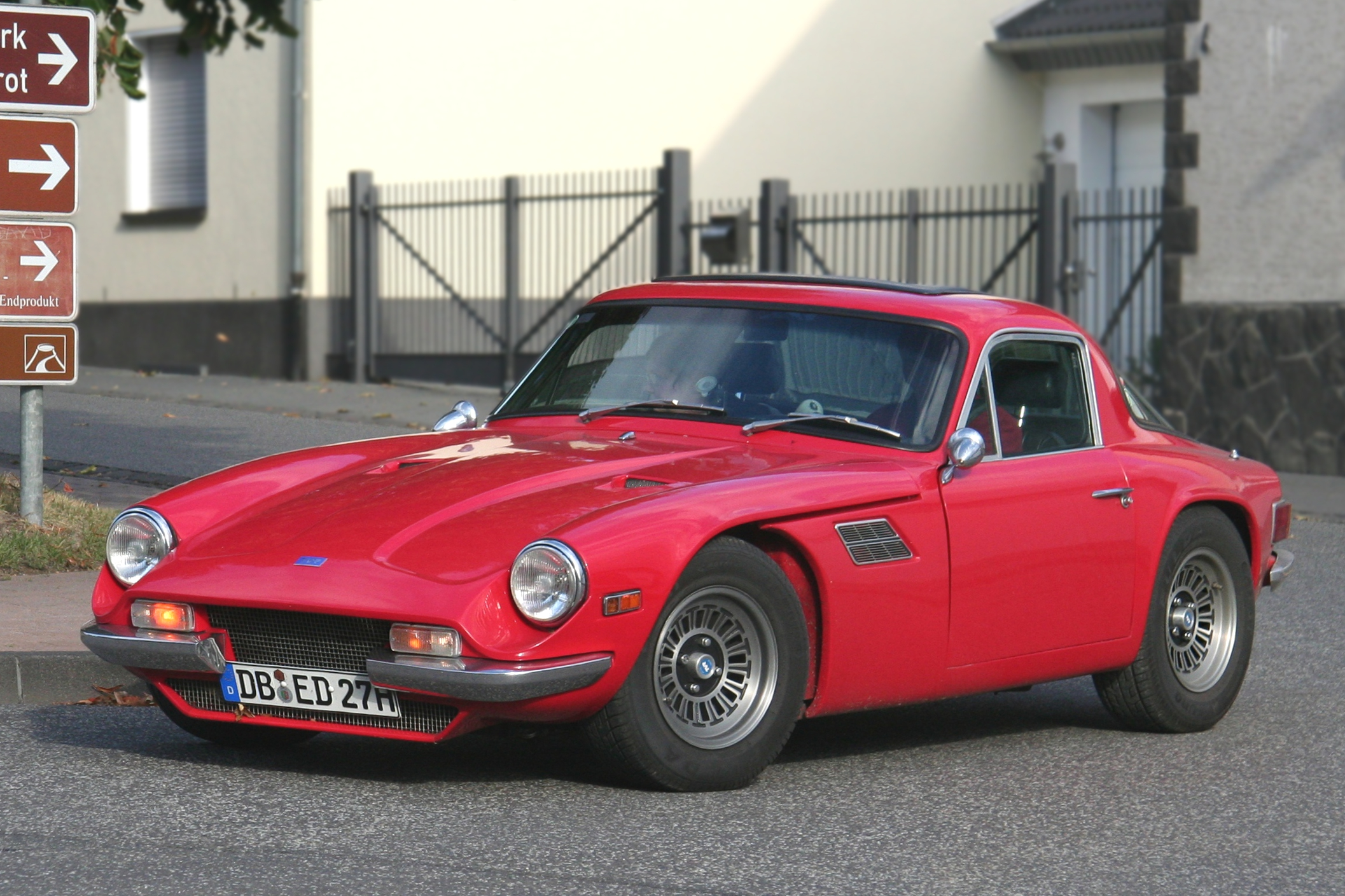
1974 TVR 3000M

As a higher-performance alternative to the 1600M and 2500M, TVR debuted the 3000M at the October 1972 Earl's Court Motor Show. It uses the 3.0 L Ford Essex V6 and cost £2278 in October 1972. The four-speed manual transmission was also available with a switchable Laycock de Normanville overdrive. The early coupés weighed around 950 kg (2,094 lb).

Produced for only one year between 1973 and 1974, the 3000ML was a special luxury version of the 3000M that included a walnut veneer dashboard, leather trim, Wilton carpets, sunroof, and high-backed seats of a style different from those found in the standard cars. It also featured extra soundproofing and a roof liner made using West of England cloth. A total of 654 naturally aspirated 3000Ms were built, including both the standard and luxury trim levels.

In 1973, a single 3000M chassis had a new Rover V8 engine installed by Martin Lilley's dealership business, Barnet Motor Company. This would prove to be a one-off exercise (due to the difficulty of acquiring brand new Rover V8s at the time.)

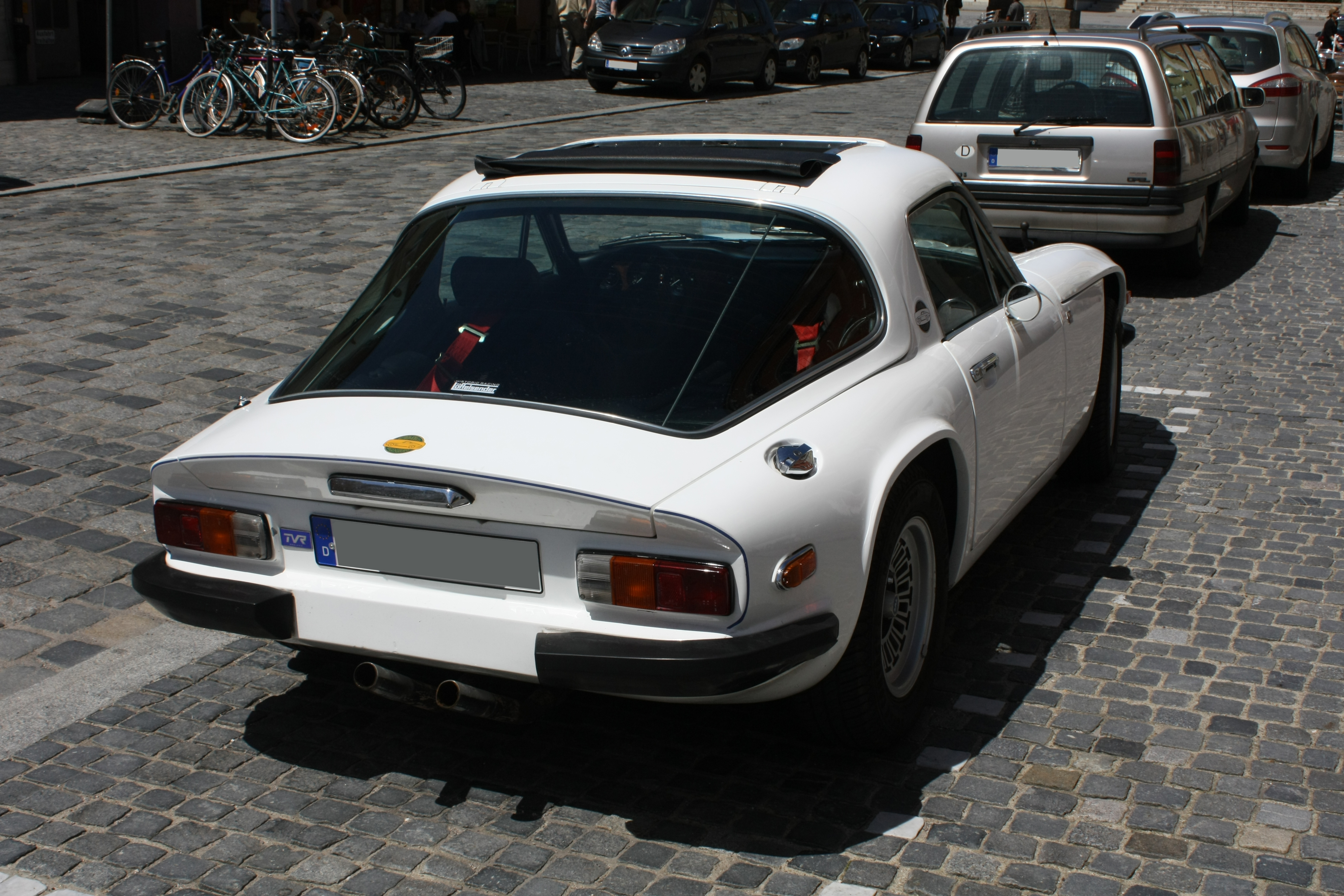
Rear of a Taimar, showing the separate hatch

The first major alteration to the M-series body was the hatchback Taimar, introduced at the October 1976 British International Motor Show and using the same mechanicals as the 3000M. The name was inspired by the name of Martin's friend's girlfriend, Tayma. The opening hatchback alleviated the previous difficulty of maneuvering luggage over the seats to stow it in the cargo area, and the hatch itself was opened electrically via a solenoid-actuated latch triggered by a button on the driver's doorjamb. Over its three-year production, a total of 395 normally aspirated Taimars were built.

To commemorate the first decade of Lilley's ownership of TVR, twelve 3000M anniversary cars were produced. Because the company had originally planned to build exactly ten, the first ten of these cars were individually numbered ("Martin 1" through "Martin 10"). Each car had a pair of special kick plates. The cars were painted Rover Tobacco Leaf with a Rover Mexico Brown model band and finished with a brown vinyl roof with a lighter brown vinyl sunroof. The cars were fitted with all the extras available, including Wolfrace alloy wheels. As of 2024, it is believed that only one of the ten cars is registered on British roads and one car has been converted to left hand drive, residing in Germany.

=== Numbered commemorative Martin cars ===
Number	Chassis
Martin 1	3598FM
Martin 2	3599FM
Martin 3	3600FM
Martin 4	3601FM
Martin 5	3667FM

Number	Chassis
Martin 6	3710FM
Martin 7	3699FM
Martin 8	3716FM
Martin 9	3713FM
Martin 10	3709FM

=== 3000S ===
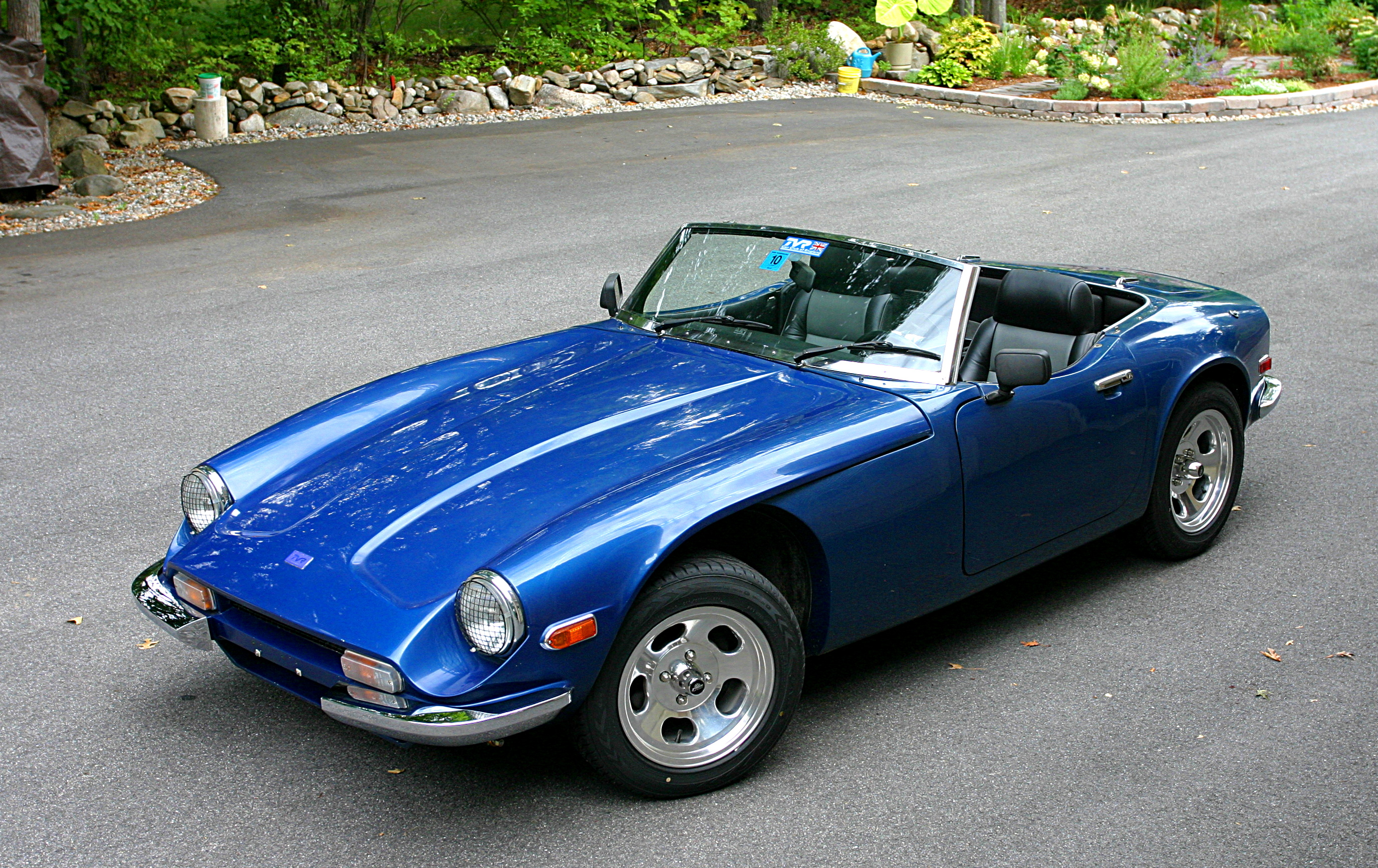
1979 TVR 3000S fitted with earlier chrome bumpers

The final body style for the M series, an open roadster, arrived in 1978 as the TVR 3000S (marketed in some places as the "Convertible", and referred to at least once as the "Taimar Roadster".) Like the Taimar, the 3000S was mechanically identical to the 3000M; the body, however, had undergone significant changes. Only the nose of the car was the same as the previous coupes, as the windscreen, doors, and rear end had all been reworked. The redesign of the doors precluded the possibility of using wind-up windows, so sliding sidecurtains were instead fitted. These could be removed entirely and stowed in the boot, which, for the first time on a TVR, was a separate compartment with its own lid. The boot lid was operated electrically in a manner similar to the Taimar's hatch. Its design was not finalised by the time the first cars entered production, so the first several cars (including the prototype) were built with no cutout for boot access. The final styling tweaks and the production of moulds for the fibreglass were done by Topolec Ltd. of Norfolk. The styling of the 3000S was revived in a somewhat modernised form later, with the 1987 introduction of the TVR S series (although the S series shared almost no components with the M-series cars.)

The windscreen and convertible top had been adapted from those used on the Jensen-Healey roadster. Because Jensen Motors had ceased operation in 1976, the windscreen and sidecurtain designs were done by a company named Jensen Special Products, which was run by former Jensen employees. The design for the convertible top was finalised by Car Hood Company in Coventry.

One of the minor undocumented variations found on M-series cars is the presence of a map light built into the upper windscreen surround of the 3000S. It appears to have been included only on a very small number of cars built near the end of the production run.

When production of the 3000S ended (with 258 cars built), it cost £8,730. Reportedly, 67 of these cars were in a left-hand drive configuration, and 49 were exported to North America.

=== US emissions certification ===
US rules meant that Triumph's federally certified 2.5 L inline-six engine could be installed in TVRs for US sale with less rigorous testing, even though Triumph themselves stopped offering this engine in 1976. Aware that supplies of the Triumph 2.5 L engine would eventually be exhausted, TVR had contracted Californian company Olson Engineering, Inc. to design modifications to the Essex V6 such that it could be EPA-certified in 1976. (Note: In several books on the topic, the name of Olson Engineering is misspelled "Olsen".) A legislative change also meant that the Essex engine could now be certified with the less onerous process. They were successful in this effort, and imports of the 142 hp (106 kW) Essex-engined M-series cars began late in 1977 (for 1978). An owner's handbook supplement for US Federal models indicates that the emissions control system used a catalytic converter, exhaust gas recirculation, and secondary air injection.

In the middle of 1979, Stewart Halstead organized the creation of TVR Sports Cars, Inc., which was intended to replace TVR Cars of America as the primary importer after Gerry Sagerman left the TVR import business. The new company was to be headed by an American, Pierre Arquin.

==== Import of non-compliant cars ====
Between October 1979 and January 1980, four shipments with a total of twenty-eight 3000S cars were received by Arquin's import business. These cars were apparently marked by the importer as being emissions compliant without the Olson Engineering emissions kit actually having been fitted. Dealers were made aware of this fact, but were each apparently coerced into buying at least two of the non-compliant cars with the threat of withholding spare parts for other TVR models. One dealer explained the situation to a customer who happened to work for the US government in a regulatory capacity, and he reported the violation to the authorities. Eighteen of the twenty-eight cars were seized by the government. The remaining ten cars had already been delivered to a third party and "an institutional decision was made not to seize those cars."

During the long period of time during which Martin Lilley attempted to communicate with US customs officials to resolve the situation, the impounded cars were neglected and stored outside, where they deteriorated and were vandalized. The cars were eventually re-exported, repaired, and sold in Germany, but the short-term financial impact of the unsalable cars (worth over £100,000 in total) was damaging to the development of the M-series replacement, the Tasmin.

Chassis numbers identified in USA v. Pierre J. Arquin and TVR Engineering
17 October 1979	12 December 1979	9 January 1980	17 January 1980
Customs # 80-171871-1	Customs # 80-172103-8	Customs # 80-112821-7	Customs # 80-112855-0
4924FM	4600FM	4946FM	4687FM
4926FM	4604FM	4948FM	4691FM
4928FM	4654FM	4950FM	4886FM
4930FM	4904FM	4952FM	4892FM
4932FM	4912FM	4888FM	4689FM
4954FM	4960FM		4944FM
4956FM	4962FM		4685FM
4958FM	4964FM		

=== Specifications ===
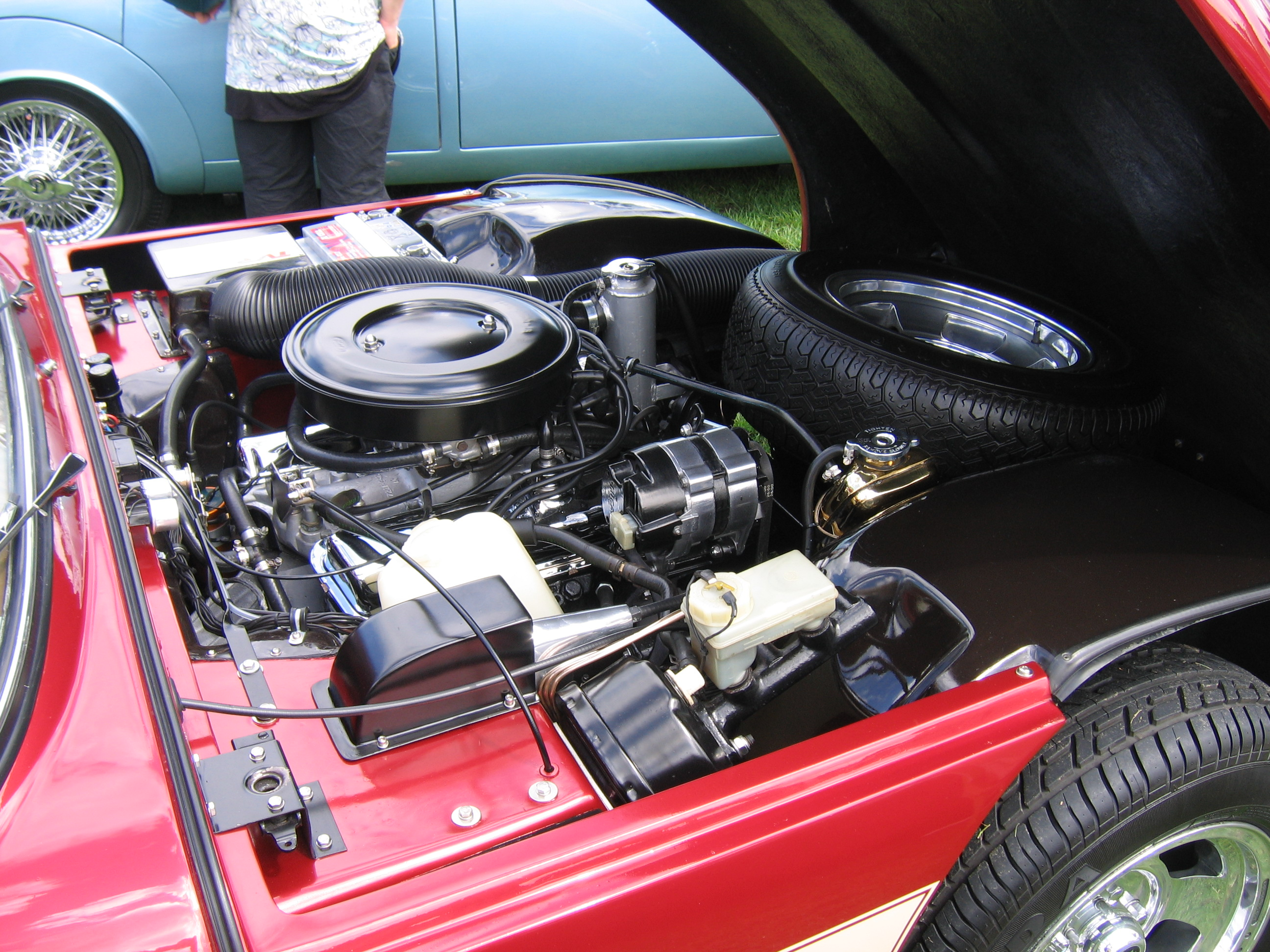
Engine compartment in a TVR 3000M (right-hand drive)

- Top speed - 121 mph (195 km/h)
- Acceleration:

0-60 mph: 7.7 sec
30-50 mph in top: 6.6 sec
50-70 mph in top: 6.1 sec

- Engine displacement - 2,994 cc (bore and stroke: 93.6 mm (3.7 in) x 72.4 mm (2.9 in))
- Engine type - Normally aspirated cast-iron V6 with pushrod-operated two-valve cast-iron heads
- Compression ratio - 9.0:1
- Fueling - Twin-choke Weber 38 non-progressive carburettor
- Peak power - 138 bhp (103 kW; 140 PS) at 5,000 rpm
- Peak torque - 192 lb⋅ft (260 N⋅m) at 3,000 rpm
- Transmission - 4-speed manual, optional overdrive
- Numbers built:

3000M: 654
Taimar: 395
3000S: 258

- Chassis numbers:

3000M: 2410FM through 4940FM
Taimar: 3838FM through 4966FM
3000S: 4286FM through 4968FM

== Turbos ==
To further increase the performance of the 3000M, TVR contracted Ralph Broad's engine tuning company, Broadspeed, to develop a turbocharging system for the Essex engine. The resultant 3000M Turbo prototype was unveiled at the 1975 British International Motor Show at the Earls Court Exhibition Centre, and subsequently went into production. In lieu of fuel injection, a carburettor was run inside a pressurized box atop the engine, and the turbocharger itself was mounted low and forward in the engine compartment, requiring the exhaust manifolds to exit forward. The compression ratio was lowered to reduce the engine's internal stresses. The turbocharged cars were fitted with Koni dampers and wider tyres than on the naturally aspirated model. Ultimately, TVR also produced small numbers of the Taimar Turbo and 3000S Turbo.

Among all the Turbo cars, four were built with the "Special Equipment" (SE) specification, which included a leather interior, flared wheel arches, large Compomotive split-rim alloy wheels, and a limited-slip differential. Of these four cars, three were Taimar Turbo SEs and one was a 3000S Turbo SE. The single 3000S Turbo SE was used by Martin Lilley as his personal transport until he sold it. The SE specification was also available for the normally aspirated cars, although estimates vary on the number built. Some cars that were originally built with the standard specifically were repaired with SE-style wheel arch flares by customer request.

The chassis numbers for the turbocharged cars were within the number ranges used by their normally aspirated counterparts.

=== Specifications ===
- Top speed - 155 mph (249 km/h)
- Acceleration:

0-60 mph: 5.7 sec
30-50 mph in top: 7.1 sec
50-70 mph in top: 6.4 sec

- Compression ratio - 8.0:1
- Fueling - Twin-choke Weber carburetter
- Peak power - 230 bhp (172 kW; 233 PS) at 5500 rpm
- Peak torque - 273 lb⋅ft (370 N⋅m) at 3500 rpm
- Numbers built:

3000M Turbo: 20
Taimar Turbo: 32
3000S Turbo: 13

== 5000M ==
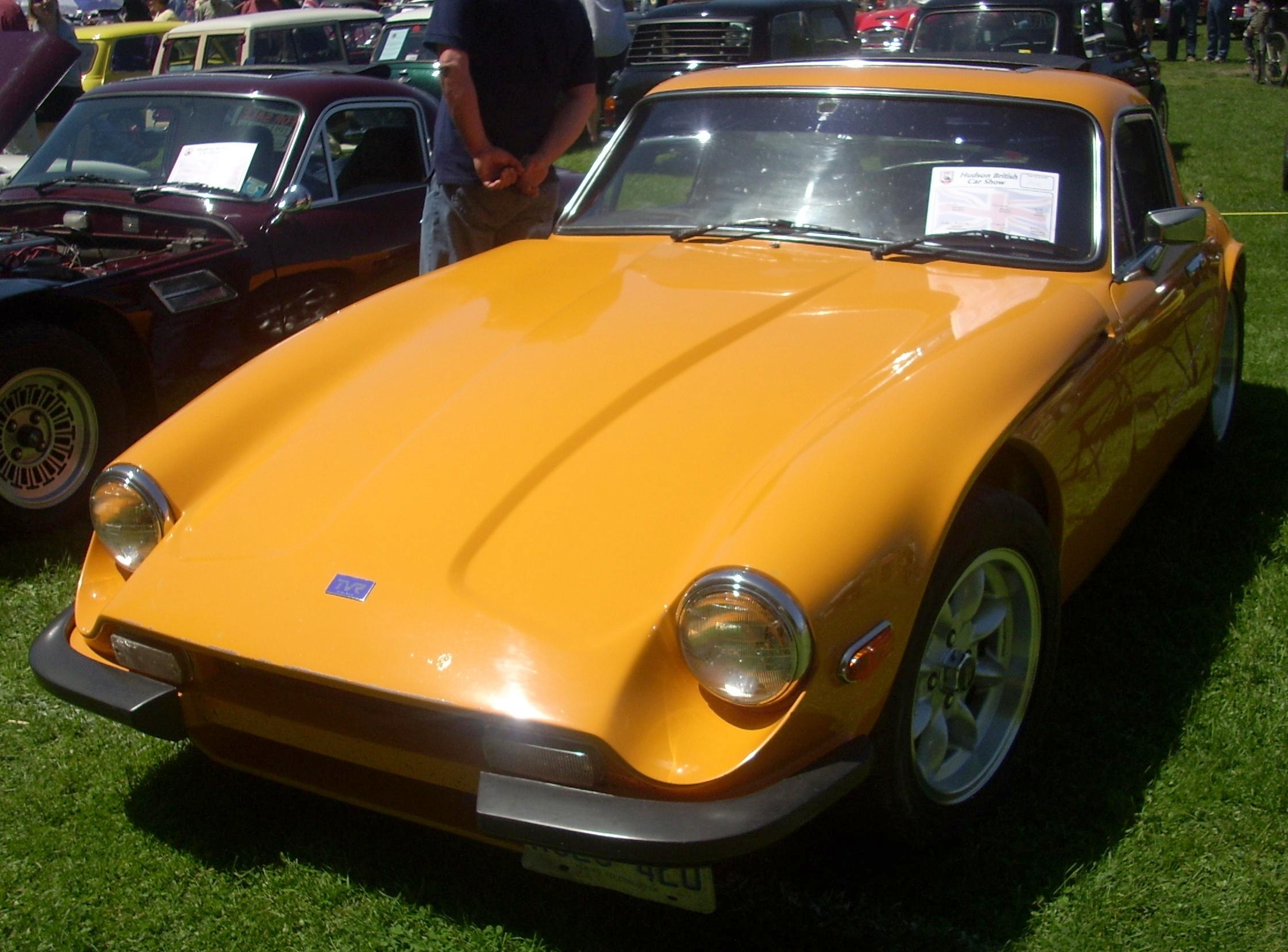
A TVR 5000M

In 1974, John Wadman (the president of the Canada-based import company TVR North America) began a project to replace the Triumph 2.5 L engine in a yellow 2500M with a Ford 302 cu in Windsor V8. Wadman handled the engineering of the conversion, which involved the use of different engine mounts, radiator, and springs. The Ford V8 was mated to a BorgWarner T-4 gearbox with a rear differential from the Chevrolet Corvette, and the resultant "5000M" was shown at the 1975 Toronto International Auto Show.

Following the 1975 fire that damaged the TVR factory in Blackpool, TVR NA ordered and pre-paid six cars from the manufacturer. This gesture helped to secure future support from TVR for Wadman's V8 conversions: the factory eventually supplied five M-series coupes without engines or transmissions, specifically for the purpose of V8 installations. TVR NA also converted three cars that were originally equipped with the Ford Essex V6, but that arrived from the factory with cracks in the cylinder block. In 1978, the factory built a car (painted white with a brown stripe) that was designated "5000M"; this was also shipped to Canada for a V8 installation. Since 1980, six Taimars have been converted to the Ford V8 as well.

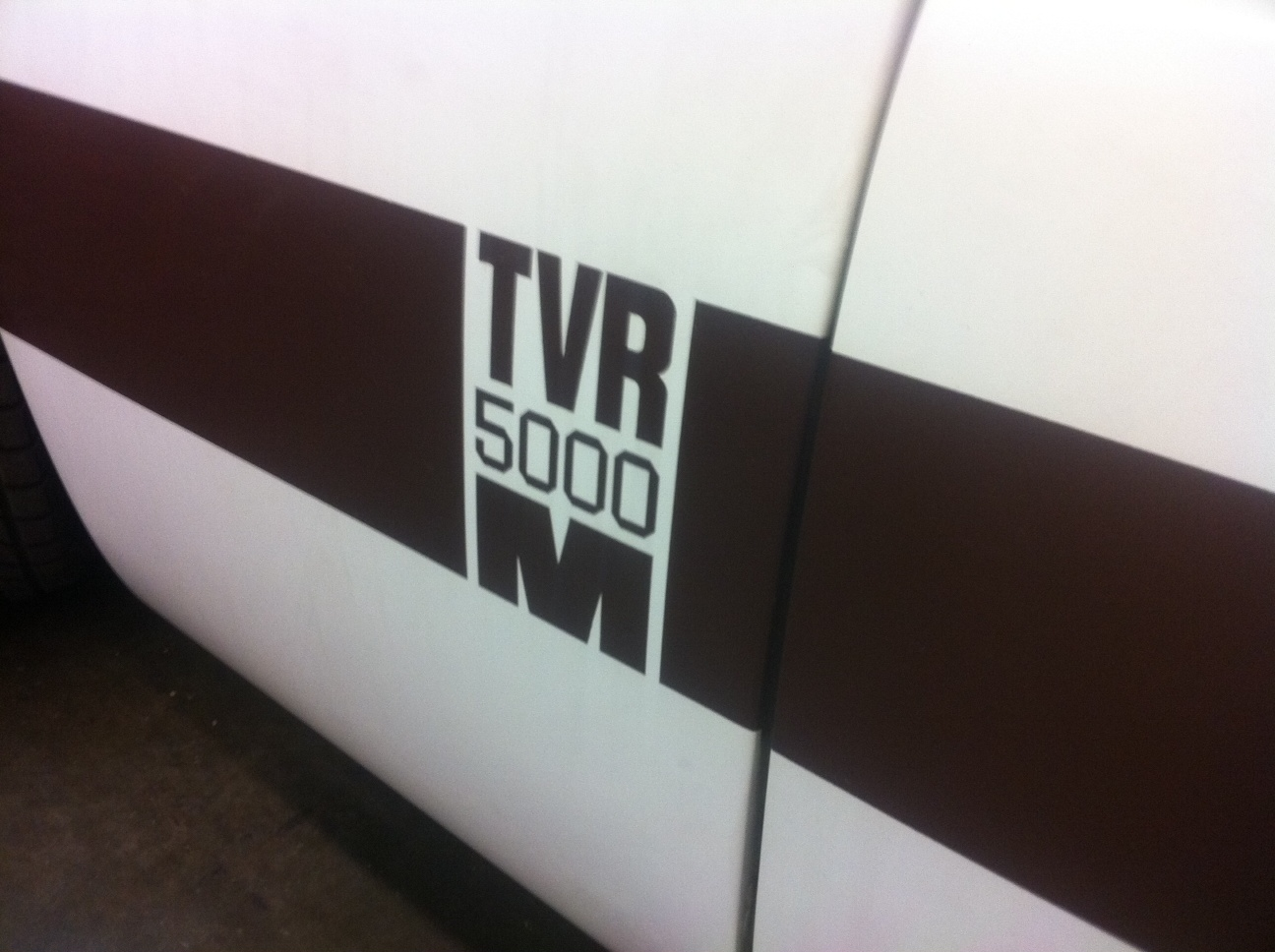
Portion of the side stripe painted by the TVR factory on one of the M-series TVRs shipped to TVR North America Canada.
