= TVR Grantura =

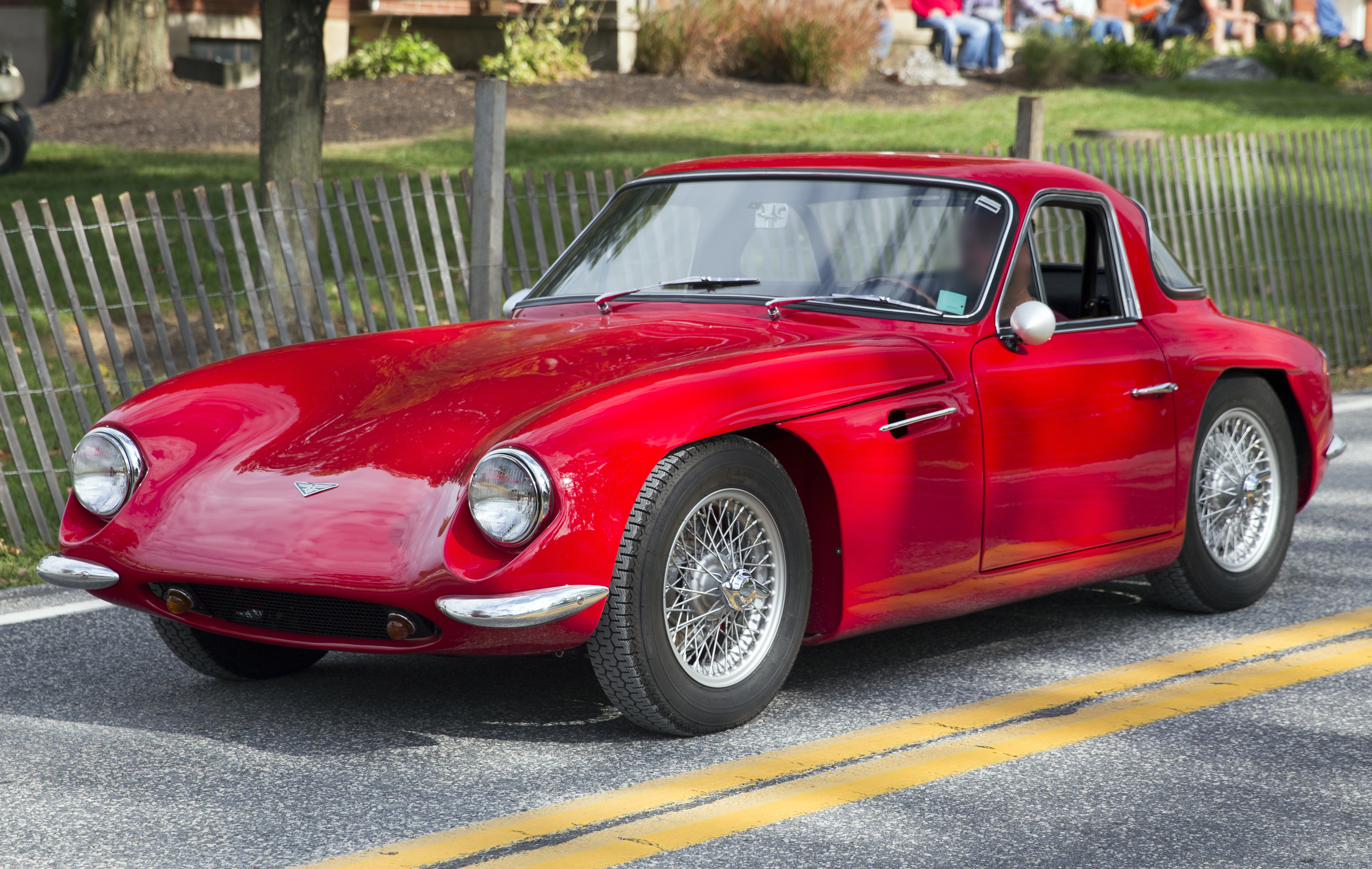
- 1961 TVR Grantura Mark IIa

Overview
- Manufacturer: TVR
- Production: 1958–1967; 796 produced
- Assembly: United Kingdom: Blackpool, England

Body and chassis
- Class: Sports car
- Layout: FR layout

Chronology
- Successor: TVR Vixen

The TVR Grantura is the first production model in a long line of TVR cars. It debuted in 1958 and went through a series of developments leading to the Mark I to Mark IV and 1800S models. The last ones were made in September 1967.

These coupés were hand-built at the TVR factory in Blackpool, England with varying mechanical specifications and could be had in kit form. All cars featured a cocktail of Austin-Healey brakes, VW Beetle or Triumph suspension parts and BMC rear axles.

The Grantura bodyshell was made from glass-reinforced plastic and made use of a variety of proprietary components. The bonnet was front hinged. There was no opening at the rear but the boot could be accessed from inside the car - the spare wheel had to be removed through the front doors. Buyers could choose from a range of powerplants which, dependant on the model in question, included a choice of side or overhead valve engines from Ford, a Coventry Climax unit, the engine from the MGA and, ultimately, the 1798cc BMC B-series engine.

== Mark I ==
TVR Grantura Mark I

Overview
- Production: 1958–1960

Body and chassis
- Layout: FR layout

Powertrain
- Engine: 1098 cc straight-4 1172 cc straight-4

Dimensions
- Wheelbase: 83.5 in (2,121 mm)
- Length: 136.5 in (3,467 mm)
- Width: 65.5 in (1,664 mm)
- Height: 47 in (1,194 mm)

The first of the Granturas used a fibreglass body moulded to a tubular steel backbone chassis and VW Beetle-based front and rear suspension. At the rear, the VW suspension was paired with an inboard MGA differential housing which was fastened to the chassis. The differential was connected by a pair of short driveshafts to each of the independently sprung hubs and road wheels. The differential was closely flanked by the inboard Austin Healy 100M drum brakes on each side, connected to each driveshaft with a Hardy-Spicer universal joint, on each inboard end, of the driveshaft. Each driveshaft extended outward to an independently sprung hub, mated with each unequal length control arm suspension linkage and road wheel, by another Hardy-Spicer universal joint at the outboard end of each driveshaft. This was an advanced feature at a time when most other cars used a solid axle rear suspension. The car was designed around a 1098 cc Coventry Climax type FWA engine but many different makes were fitted from 1172 cc Ford side valve to 1600 cc BMC from the MGA. The drum brakes originated on the Austin-Healey 100 and the windscreen on the Ford Consul.

Approximately 100 of the Mark I Grantura were built from 1958 to 1960.

== Mark II/IIa ==
TVR Grantura Series II
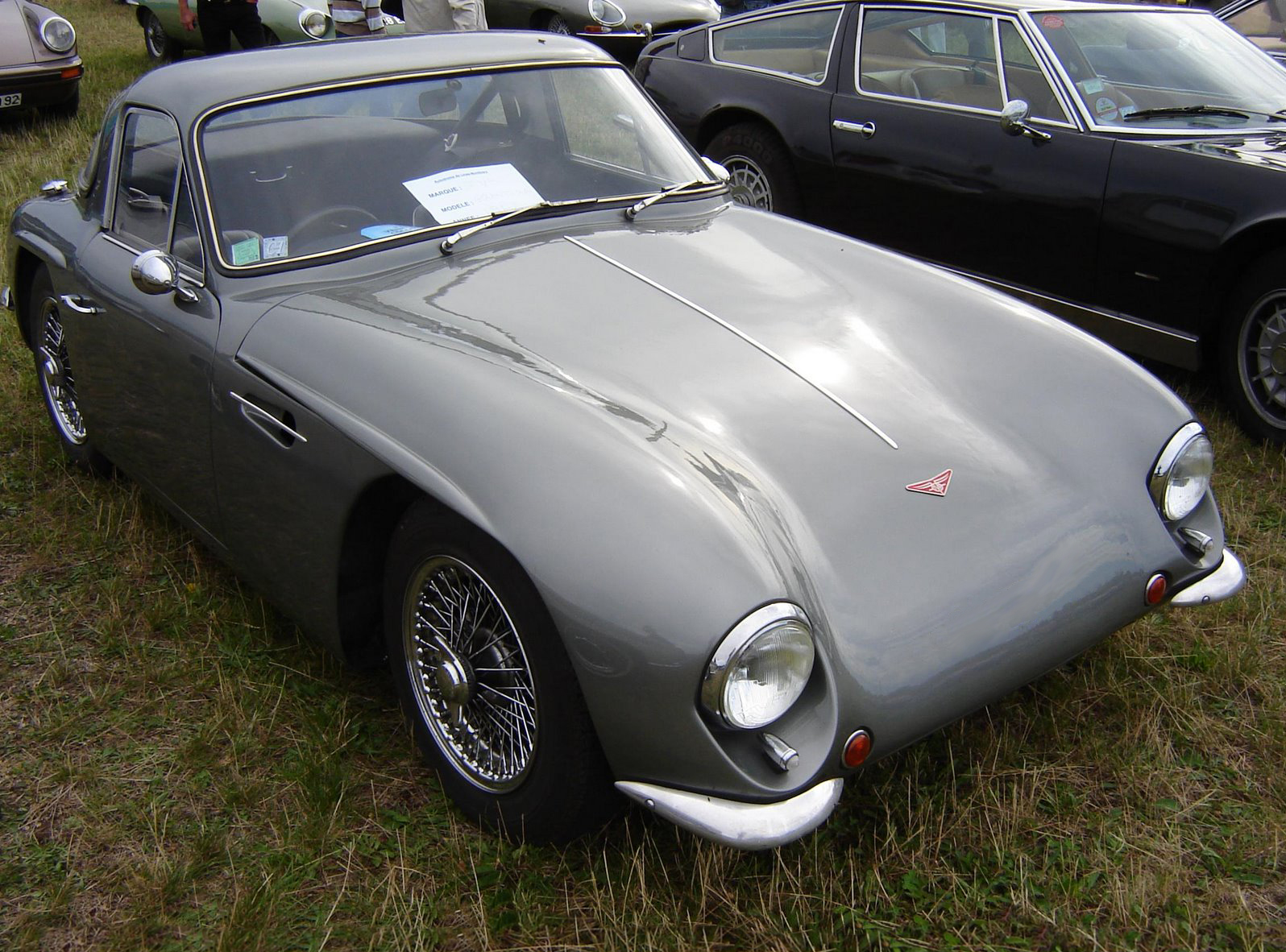

Overview
- Production: 1960–1962

Body and chassis
- Layout: FR layout

Powertrain
- Engine: 1216 cc Coventry Climax FWE I4; 1340 cc Ford Kent I4; 1588 cc BMC B-series I4; 1622 cc BMC B-series Mk II I4

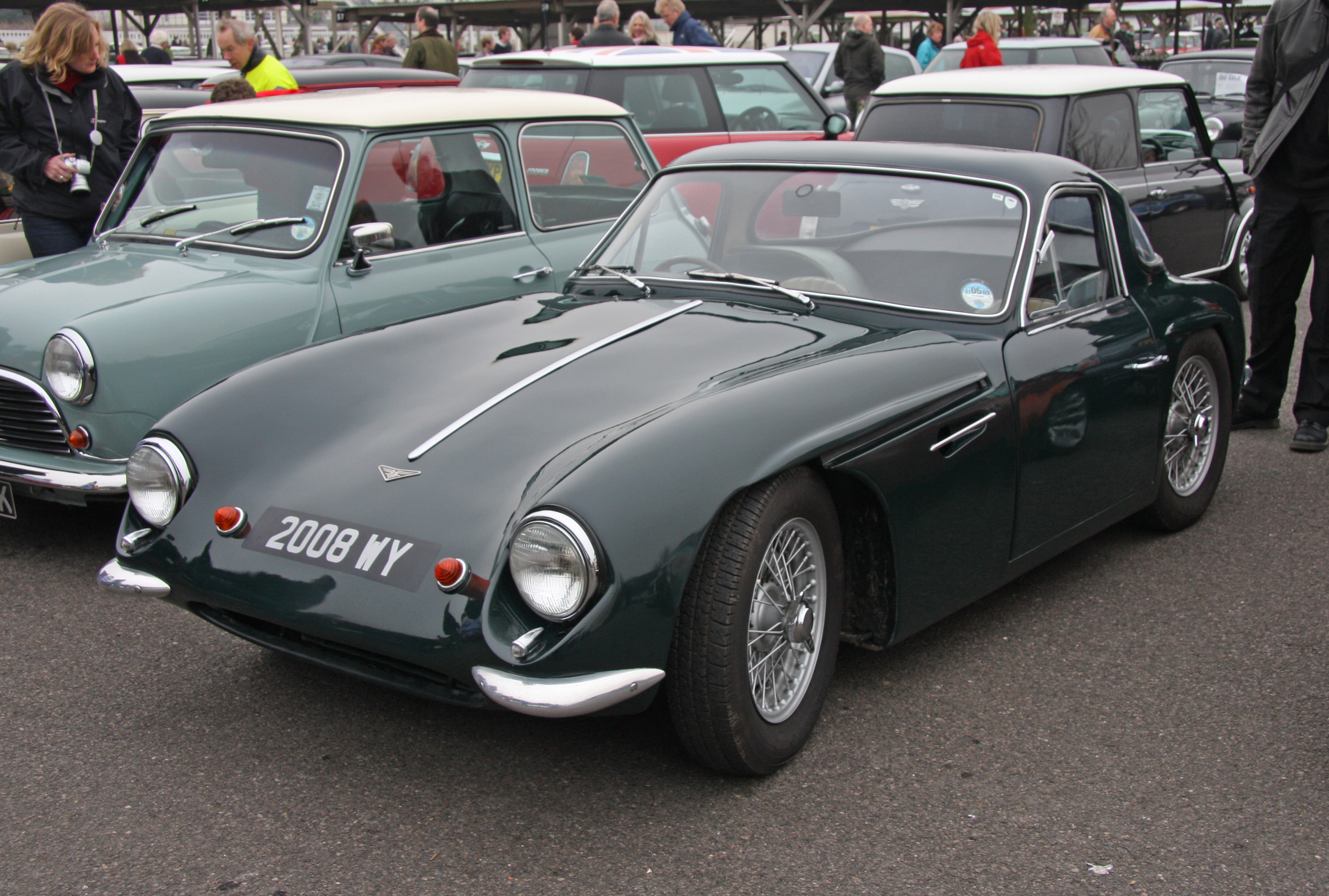
Grantura Mark II (1961)

The Mark II had MGA engines as standard but again customers could choose from a variety of power units. The Mark IIa used the 1622 cc MGA Mark II or Ford 1340 cc engine. The more expensive Coventry Climax FWA 1216 cc that was also found in the Lotus Elite was also available. Front disc brakes were standard for the Mk IIa. Rack and pinion steering was standardised.

A car with a 1600 cc MGA engine was tested by the British magazine The Motor in 1961. It had a top speed of 98.4 mph (158.4 km/h) and could accelerate from zero to 60 mph (97 km/h) in twelve seconds. Fuel consumption of 32.8 miles per imperial gallon (8.6 L/100 km; 27.3 mpg_{‑US}) was recorded. The test car cost £1,298 including taxes.

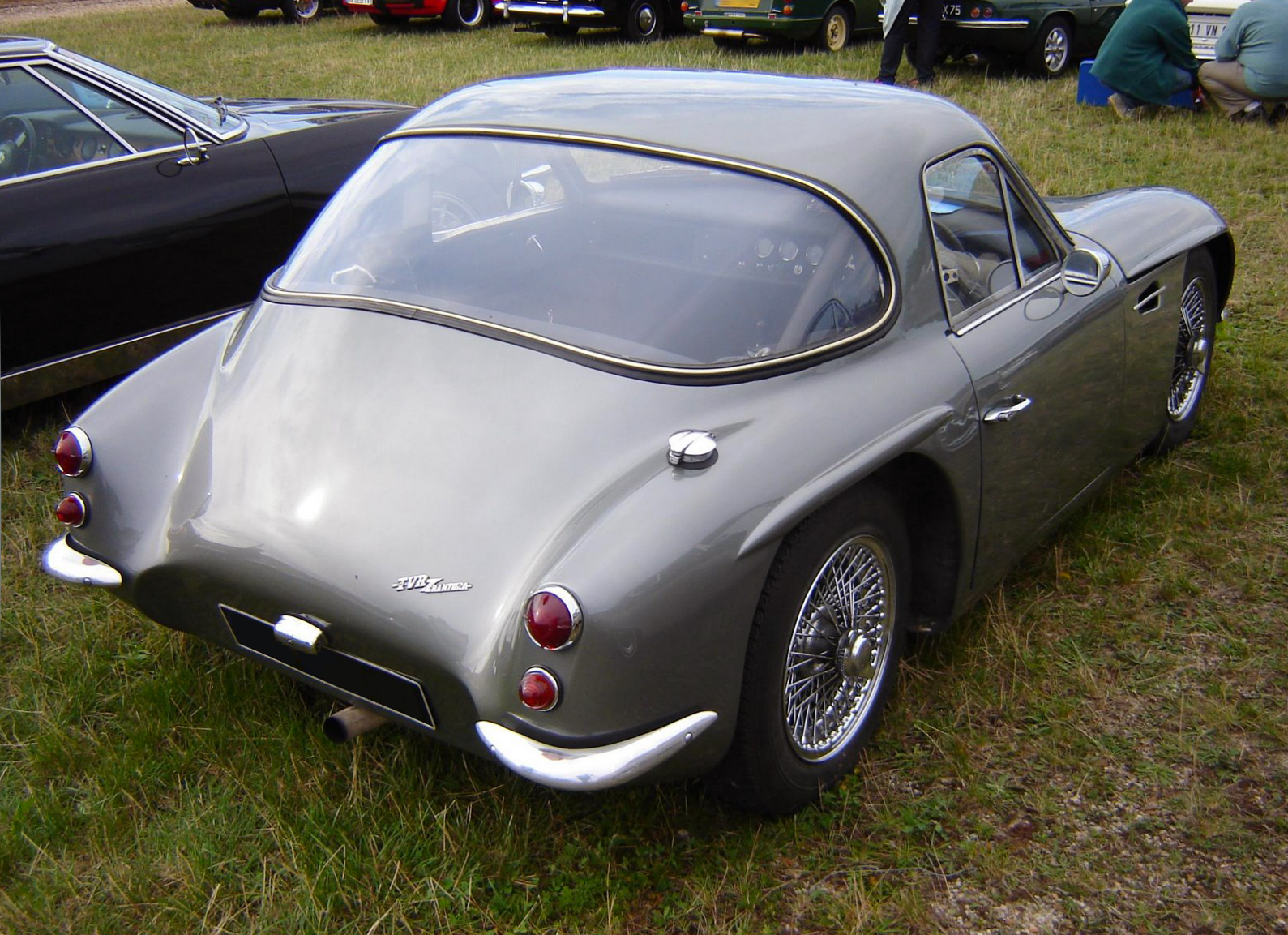
Rear end of 1962 Mark IIa

Approximately 400 of the Mark II/IIa Grantura were built.

== Mark III, Mark III 1800, 1800S and Mark IV ==
TVR Grantura Series III, Series III 1800, 1800S, and MkIV
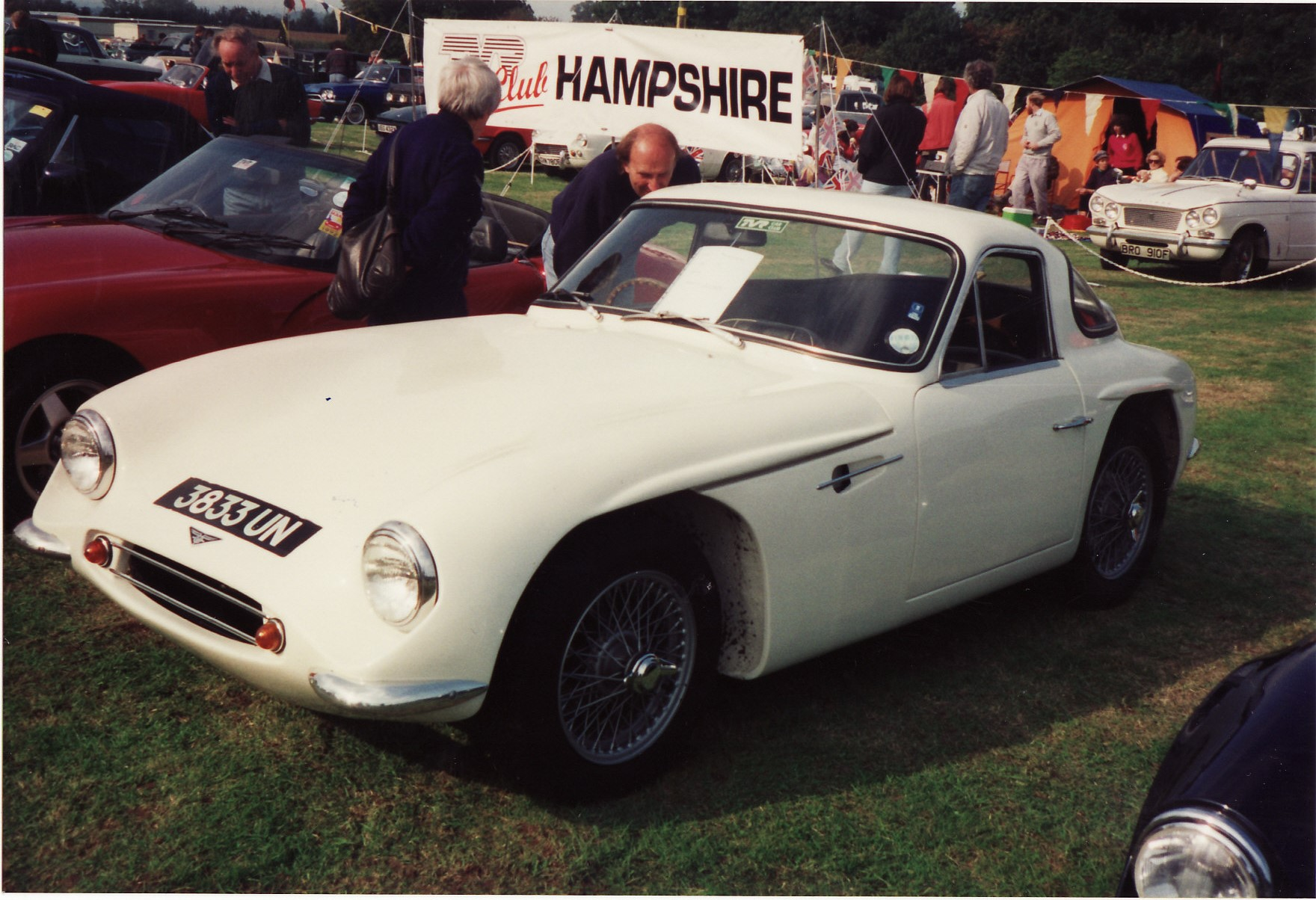
- 1962 Grantura Mark III

Overview
- Production: 1962–1967

Body and chassis
- Layout: FR layout

Powertrain
- Engine: 1622 cc I4; 1798 cc I4

Dimensions
- Wheelbase: 85.5 in (2,172 mm)
- Length: 138 in (3,505 mm) (SIII, SIII 1800, 1800S); 141.5 in (3,594 mm) (MkIV)
- Width: 64 in (1,626 mm) (SIII, SIII 1800, 1800S); 65.5 in (1,664 mm) (MkIV)

The next series of cars had a completely new, longer and stiffer chassis with innovative coil sprung independent suspension. This chassis was designed by John Thurner and would form the basis of the one used by TVR up to the launch of the 2500M cars in 1972. The Mark III also received a new front end design, with the grille mounted higher and featuring some rudimentary chrome trim.

The Mark III and the later Mark III 1800 cars used BMC B-series engines, either 1622 or 1798 cc respectively, although Ford or Coventry Climax units were also available for the earlier Mark III model. The larger capacity 1798 cc MG 'B' series engine became standard equipment around September 1963 although this more powerful engine appears to have been available as a customer-specified option prior to that date. At some point during 1963 the rear of the car was reprofiled to include a number plate mount.

In 1965 the latest version of the car became available as the 1800S with a cut off, square back (called a 'Manx tail' after the similarly tailless breed of cat) and round rear light clusters from the Ford Cortina. The 1798cc B-series engine remained but the chassis used for the 1800S and all subsequent Granturas was a modified version that, through an alteration to the line of the top chassis rails, allowed more space for the engine to fit in. This was an alteration made to the Grantura chassis to allow it also to be used as the basis for the new Griffith, a car that sported a V8 engine which was larger both in capacity and physical dimension.

After a pause in production during late 1965, under Martin Lilley's new ownership the 1800S reappeared in early 1966 rebadged as the Mark III 1800S. This was quickly followed by the new Mk IV model. The Mk IV featured a longer wheelbase, more luxurious trim and a larger fuel tank and was the first TVR to benefit from Martin Lilley's influence.

Approximately 300 of the Mark III, Mark III 1800, 1800S and MkIV cars were built (estimated to be 60 of the Mark III, 30 to 35 of the Mark III 1800, 128 of the 1800S / Mark III 1800S and 78 of the Mk IV) before being replaced in 1967 by the Vixen.

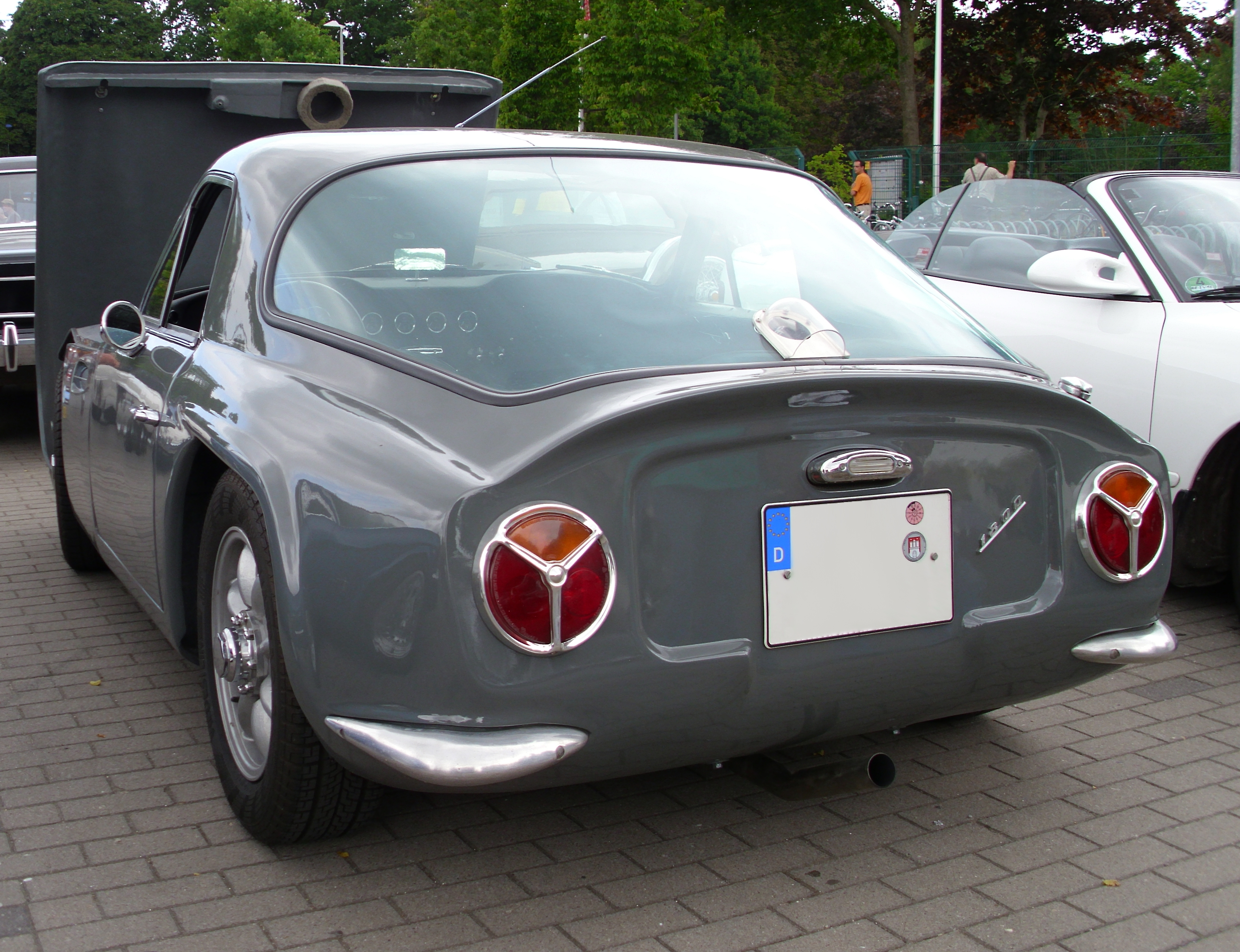
Grantura MkIV with Cortina taillights

== The TVR Grantura in pre-1966 historic racing ==
The larger-engined Mark III 1800 model of the TVR Grantura was first introduced as a road car in September 1963 and subsequently homologated for racing in April 1964. Although it is the rarest variant of the Grantura, it is by far the most popular version for pre-1966 historic competition. The main reasons are that, in addition to the obvious benefits of the more powerful 1798cc BMC 'B' engine over the previous 1622cc unit, the 1964 homologation allowed use of a limited slip differential as well as wider wheel rims (5") than those permitted on the earlier 1962/63 Mk III cars (4" or 4.5"). Then, in June 1965 an extension of the homologation allowed the car to run on even wider wheels (6"). As a result, the June 1965 specification is the ultimate form of the car for use in pre-1966 racing and the one that almost all racing Granturas are built to conform to in historic competition.

As a competition car the TVR Grantura MkIII benefits from being eligible for a wide range of historic racing and, due to its relatively light weight and good handling characteristics, it can be very effective when competing against some of the larger engined cars, especially when, as almost all examples are, it is in the June 1965 homologated Mk III 1800 trim.

Although the earlier initial version of the Mark III had its own distinct set of homologation papers dated August 1962, for racing purposes many of the cars that would have originally started on the production line as this 1962/63 model have been since modified to run to the later Mark III 1800 specification from the 1964/65 seasons. Only around 30 to 35 examples of the Grantura are thought to have left the factory in true Mk III 1800 specification in the period between late 1963 and mid-1965.

The smaller engined 1622cc Mark III cars built to the August 1962 specification are eligible to run in high profile Pre-63 events including the prestigious bi-annual Classic Le Mans race for cars that competed in period in the Le Mans 24 hours race.
