= TVR Tuscan (1967) =

TVR Tuscan (1967–1971)
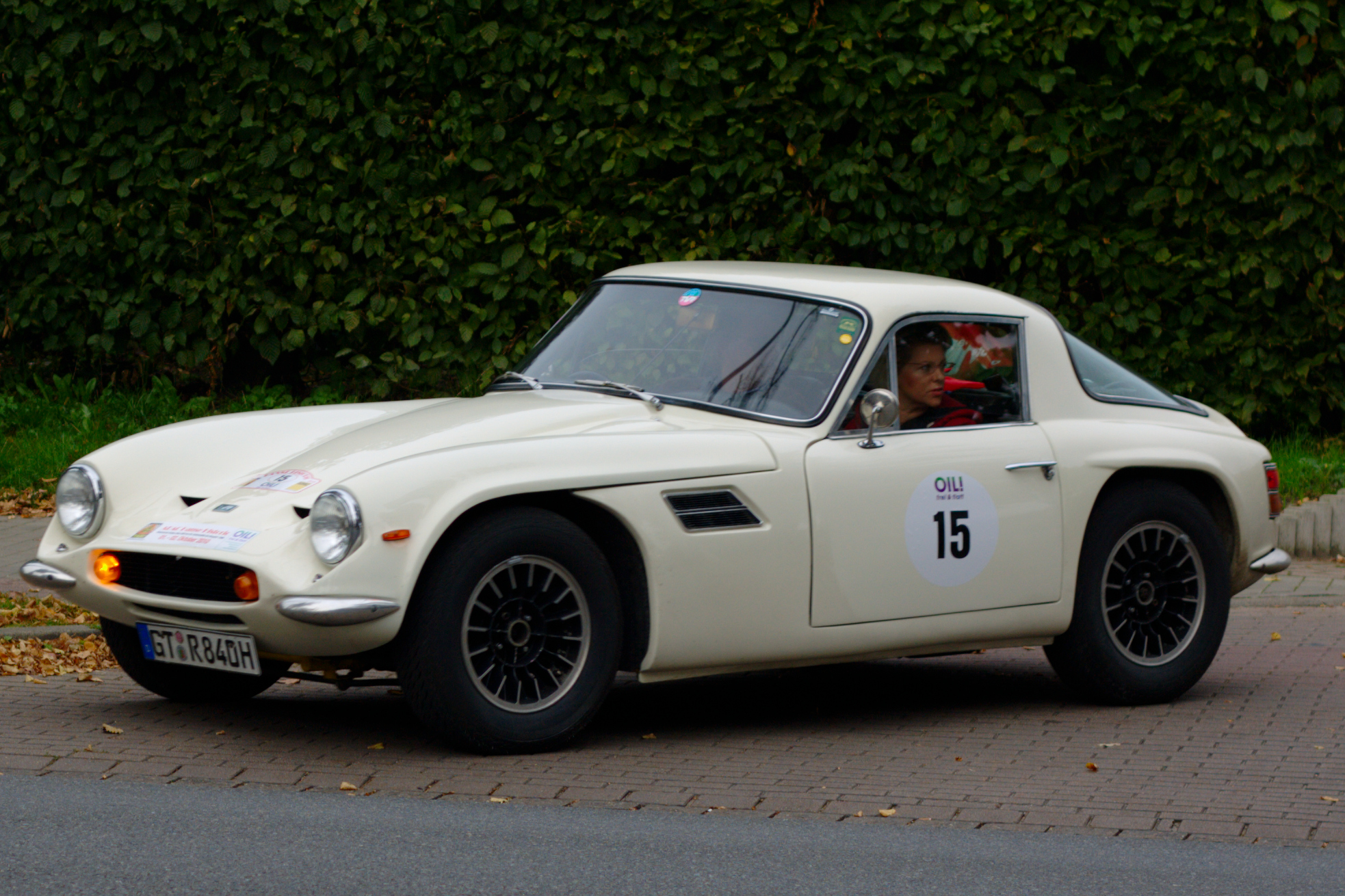
- 1967 TVR Tuscan V6

Overview
- Manufacturer: TVR
- Production: 1967–1971; 174 produced
- Assembly: United Kingdom: Blackpool, England

Body and chassis
- Class: Sports car
- Layout: FR layout

Chronology
- Predecessor: TVR Grantura
- Successor: TVR Vixen

The TVR Tuscan is a front engine, rear wheel drive sports car built by TVR from 1967 to 1971 in the company's Blackpool, England factory. It was the second car developed by TVR during the Martin Lilley era of the automotive firm.

The car was made available in both a V8 and a V6 format, with a total of 174 cars built between the two available engine formats.

== Tuscan V8 ==
TVR Tuscan V8
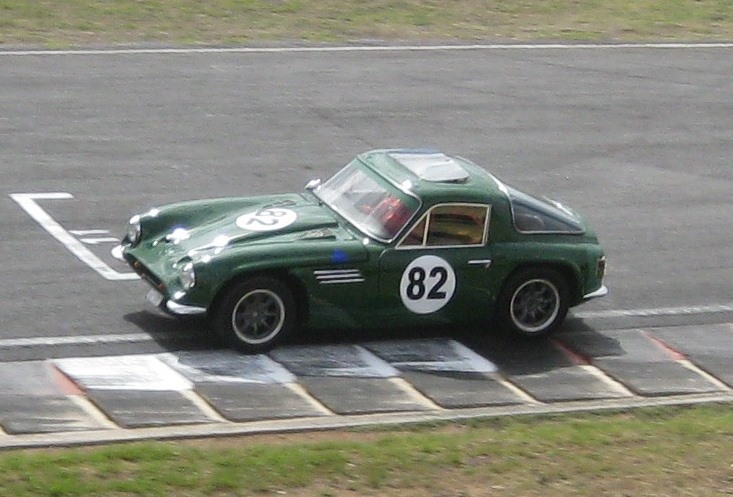
- TVR Tuscan V8

Overview
- Production: 1967–1970; 73 produced

Body and chassis
- Layout: FR layout

Powertrain
- Engine: 4728 cc Ford Windsor V8; 4942 cc Ford Windsor V8

In early 1967, the first Tuscans were made, available with only the V8 engine. Recalling the performance potential of the Grantura-based Griffith, it was based on the Grantura/Vixen and was built in three different configurations between January 1967 and early 1971. The engine was a 289 cu in (4,728 cc) Ford Windsor V8, similar to that available in early Ford Mustangs. The motor was equipped with a Ford 4-barrel carburetor, made 271 hp, and was capable of propelling the car to a top speed of 155 mph. Stopping power came from disc brakes in the front and the rear. Production of the V8 models dwindled after the release of the V6, and was discontinued altogether in 1970. In total, 73 cars were sold by TVR with a V8. Most of the Tuscan V8s were sold in the United States, with only the occasional vehicle being built with right-hand drive for the home market.

It was originally available in a short-wheelbase form with Vixen-style bodywork, looking very much like a Series IV Grantura 1800S aside from its prominent bonnet bulge. Approximately twenty-four were built. The SWB style was essentially identical to the V8-powered Griffith, which was discontinued in early 1967 as a result of the reputation it had gained for issues with build quality and reliability. The LWB car arrived a little later and used the same long-wheelbase chassis as the Vixen S2, and the same method of bolting the body to the chassis. About another two dozen of these LWB Tuscan V8s were built until production ended in 1969.

1970 saw the introduction of the widebody Tuscan V8 (LWB SE), which featured a restyled body shell that gave a preview to the upcoming M-series body style. The widebody Tuscan was powered by the larger 302 cu in (4,942 cc) version of the small block Ford V8, and, although estimates vary, it appears that approximately ten widebody cars were built between 1970 and 1971. The V8 SE also had wider, hooded taillights mounted at a reverse rake.

Total production:

- SWB: approximately 24
- LWB: approximately 24
- LWB SE: approximately 10

== Tuscan V6 ==
TVR Tuscan V6
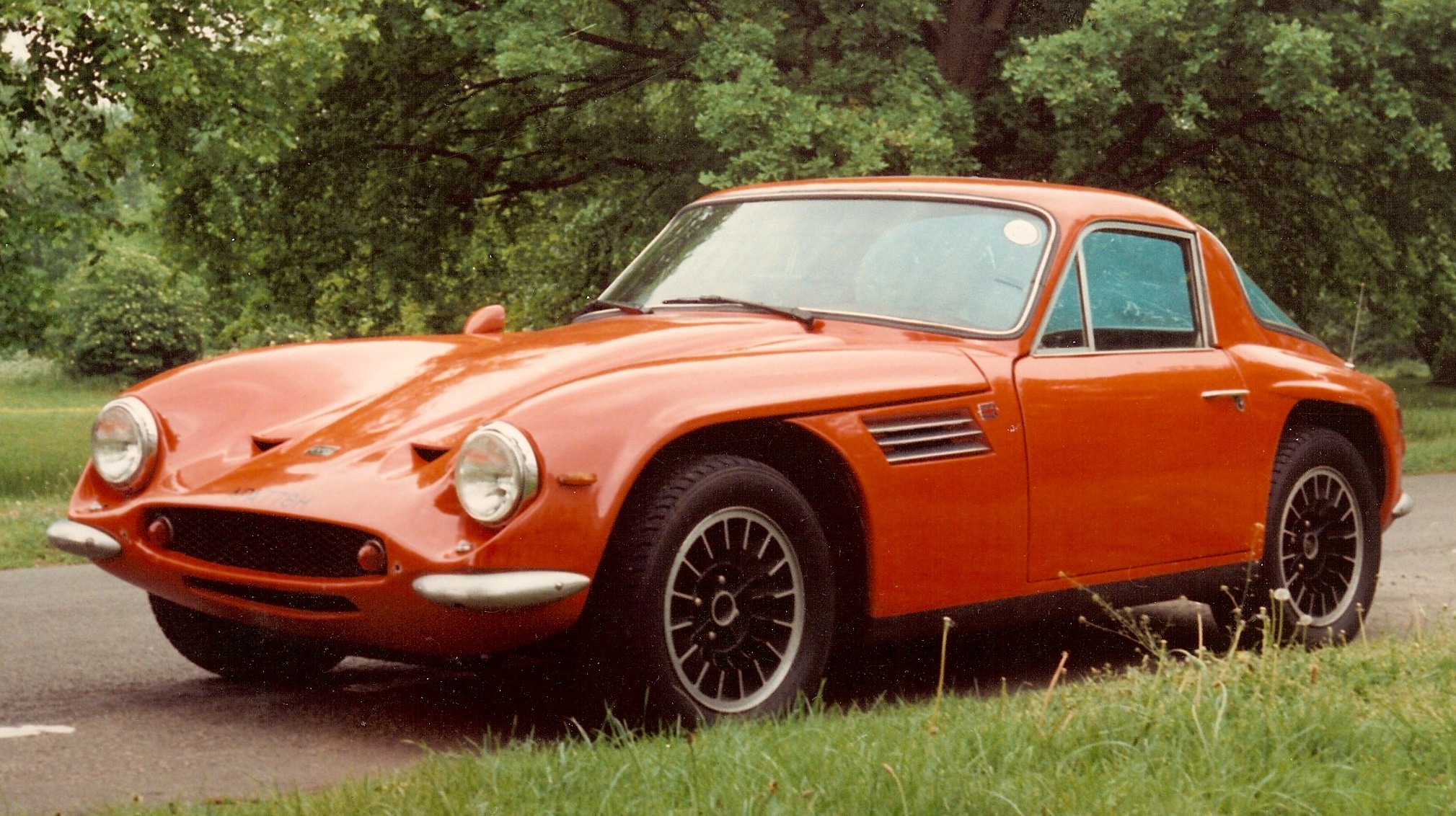
- 1969 TVR Tuscan V6

Overview
- Production: 1969–1971; 101 produced

Body and chassis
- Layout: FR layout

Powertrain
- Engine: 2994 cc Ford Essex OHV V6

In mid-1969, to provide a car at an intermediate level of performance, TVR released the Tuscan V6. Equipped with a 2994 cc OHV Ford Essex V6 motor, which came from Ford's British division (also used in the Ford Zodiac Mk IV and Ford Capri). The brakes were changed from the V8 model, as only the front used discs, and the rear had drum brakes. The V6 model was also narrower, using the same bodyshell as the TVR Vixen but with provision of an access panel above the rear differential, and a round tubular frame chassis similar to the TVR Vixen but with some upgrades. It did, however, receive the same Salisbury differential as the Tuscan V8. The 3.0 L V6 powerplant produced 138 hp, and 182 lb/ft of torque equipped with a twin choke synchronous Weber 40DFAV carburetor and the car was able to reach speeds of 125 mph. At the time it was offered for sale, the Essex V6 did not meet emissions requirements in the United States, so the Tuscan V6 was not exported there although at least one car was sent into the US masquerading as a TVR Vixen. Most of the cars produced were right-hand-drive, for the home market. There were a total of 101 V6 cars produced including a prototype before the line was stopped altogether to make way for its successor, the TVR Vixen 2500.

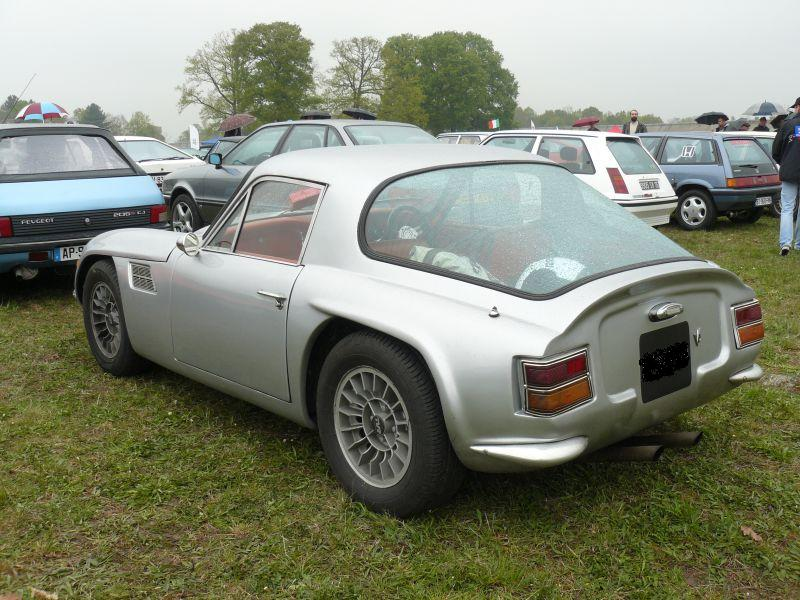
TVR Tuscan V6

== See also ==
- TVR Tuscan Challenge - introduced in 1988, this was a competition-only roadster built in small numbers
- TVR Tuscan Speed Six - Recent model (produced from 1999-2006) that bears the same name.
