= TVR Vixen =

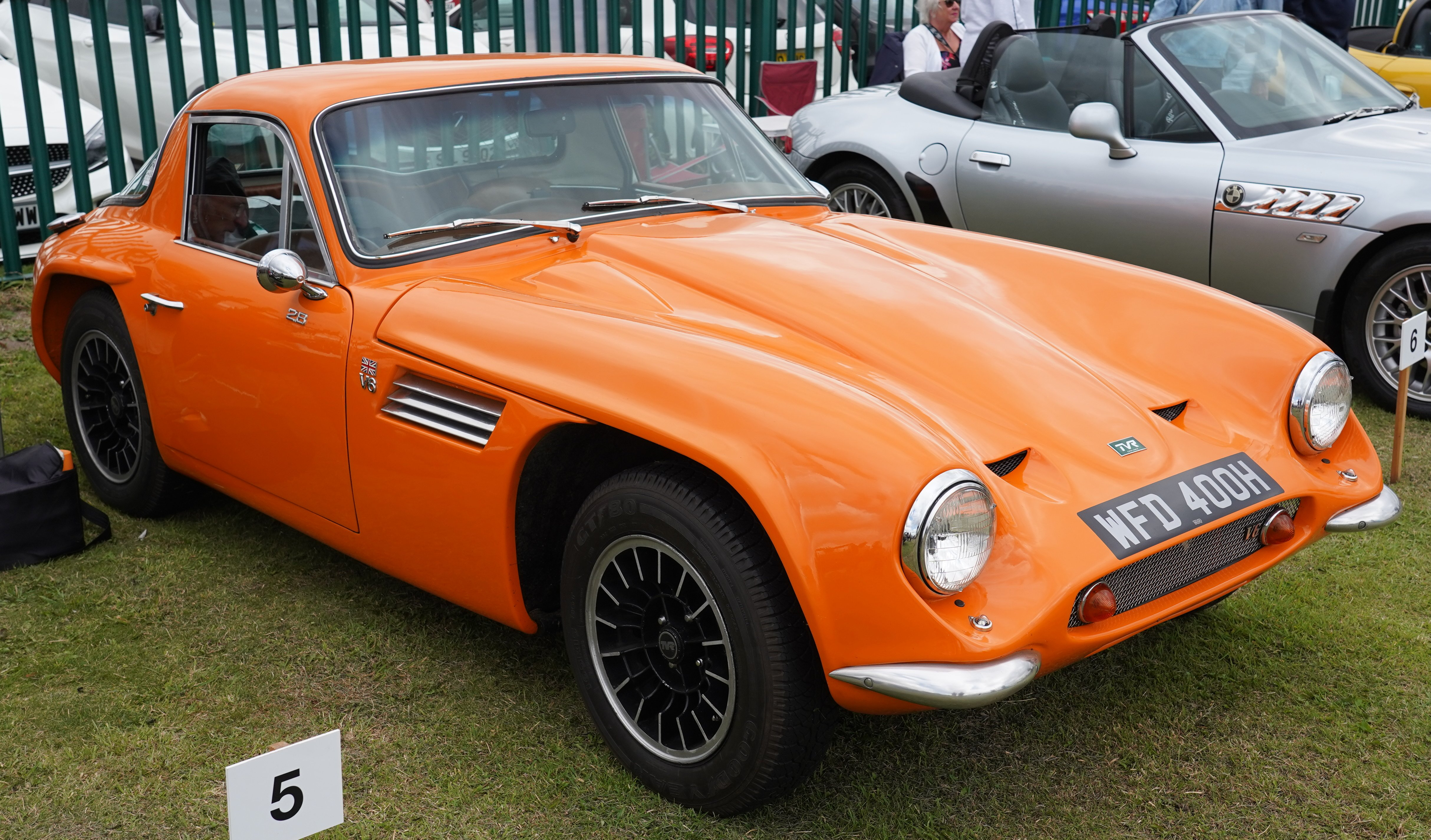
- TVR Vixen S2

Overview
- Manufacturer: TVR
- Also called: TVR 1300; TVR 2500
- Production: 1967–1973; 1029 produced
- Assembly: United Kingdom: Blackpool, England

Body and chassis
- Class: Sports car
- Body style: Coupe
- Related: TVR Tuscan V8/V6

Powertrain
- Engine: 1296 cc Triumph I4; 1599 cc Ford Kent I4; 2498 cc Triumph 2.5 I6
- Transmission: Ford 4-speed all-synchromesh manual

Dimensions
- Wheelbase: 85.5 in (2,172 mm) (S1); 90 in (2,286 mm)
- Length: 145 in (3,683 mm)
- Width: 64 in (1,626 mm)
- Height: 48 in (1,219 mm)
- Curb weight: 1,624 lb (737 kg)

Chronology
- Predecessor: TVR Grantura
- Successor: TVR M Series

The TVR Vixen is a hand-built sports car which was produced by TVR in Blackpool, England from 1967 until 1973. Ford-engined in most of its configurations, it succeeded the MGB-engined TVR Grantura 1800S. It is also the basis for the high-performance TVR Tuscan which was available in both V6 and V8 configurations.

== Design ==
The body was made of glass fibre, which was fitted to a tubular-frame chassis. The chassis was the same as that used in the Mk4 1800S, a model which was discontinued just before Vixen production began. The chassis used double wishbone suspension at both ends, and disc brakes at the front (with drums at the back.) The car was significantly lighter than mainstream competitors such as the MG MGB GT, and offered correspondingly class leading performance and fuel economy.

== Variants ==
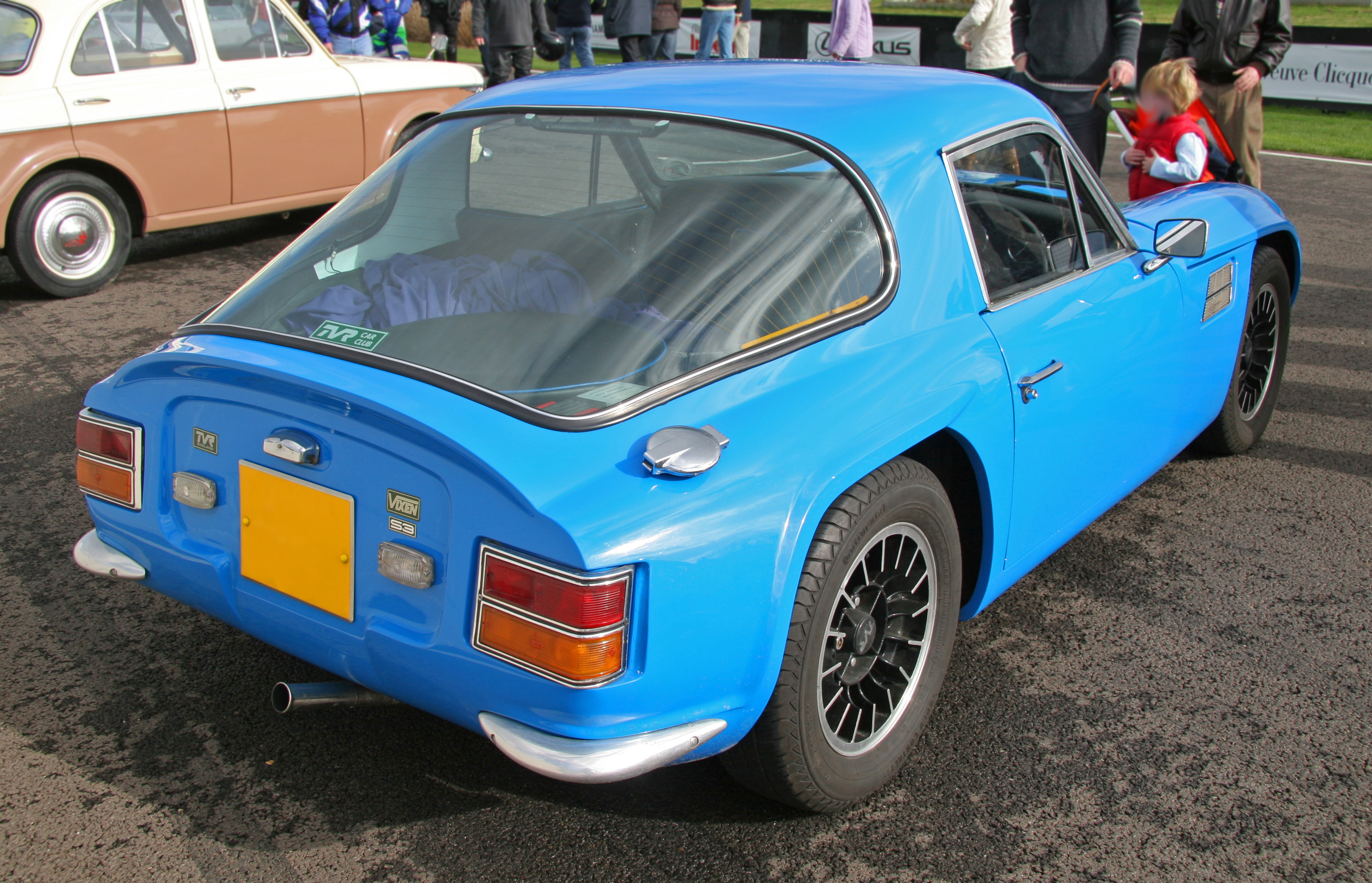
Rear view of a Vixen S3

The Vixen Series 1 was introduced in 1967 as an evolution of the discontinued 1800S. Although it used the same chassis as the outgoing car, the significant change was the use of the 1599 cc Ford Kent engine (as found in the Ford Cortina GT), developing 88 bhp.

The engine change was necessitated by the problems TVR were having with receiving MG engine deliveries, and also in an effort to lower the price of the car. To use up remaining supplies, the first twelve Vixens built still received the MGB engine.

The bodywork was also slightly revised, with the bonnet having a broad flat air intake scoop. The rear of the car with fitted with the round Cortina Mark I tail lamps.

- Total S1 production: 117

The 1968 S2 was built with the longer (90 inch) wheelbase chassis, introduced on the Tuscan V8 but which TVR had now standardized to address complaints about difficulty of ingress. The bonnet was restyled again, with some early cars having a prominent central bulge, and later cars having twin intake ducts at the front corners of the bonnet. The tail lamps were updated from the round Cortina Mark I style to the newer wraparound Mark II style. Also very significant was that the body was bolted (rather than bonded) to the chassis, meaning that it could be easily removed for repairs. The interior was improved, with a leather-skinned steering wheel mounted much lower than before. In a further attempt to improve the quality feel, the body was thicker and panel fit was improved. In December 1968, TVR announced that two more models, the S.2 Sport and S.2 Super Sports would be available as standard. These models came with an uprated engine from Speedwell including fully balanced bottom end, ported cylinder head and two twin choke Weber carburettors with the Sports producing 100 bhp and the Super Sports 115 bhp. Both of these models came with seat belts and leather steering wheel as standard with both models designated an S.2.S.

- Total S2 production: 438

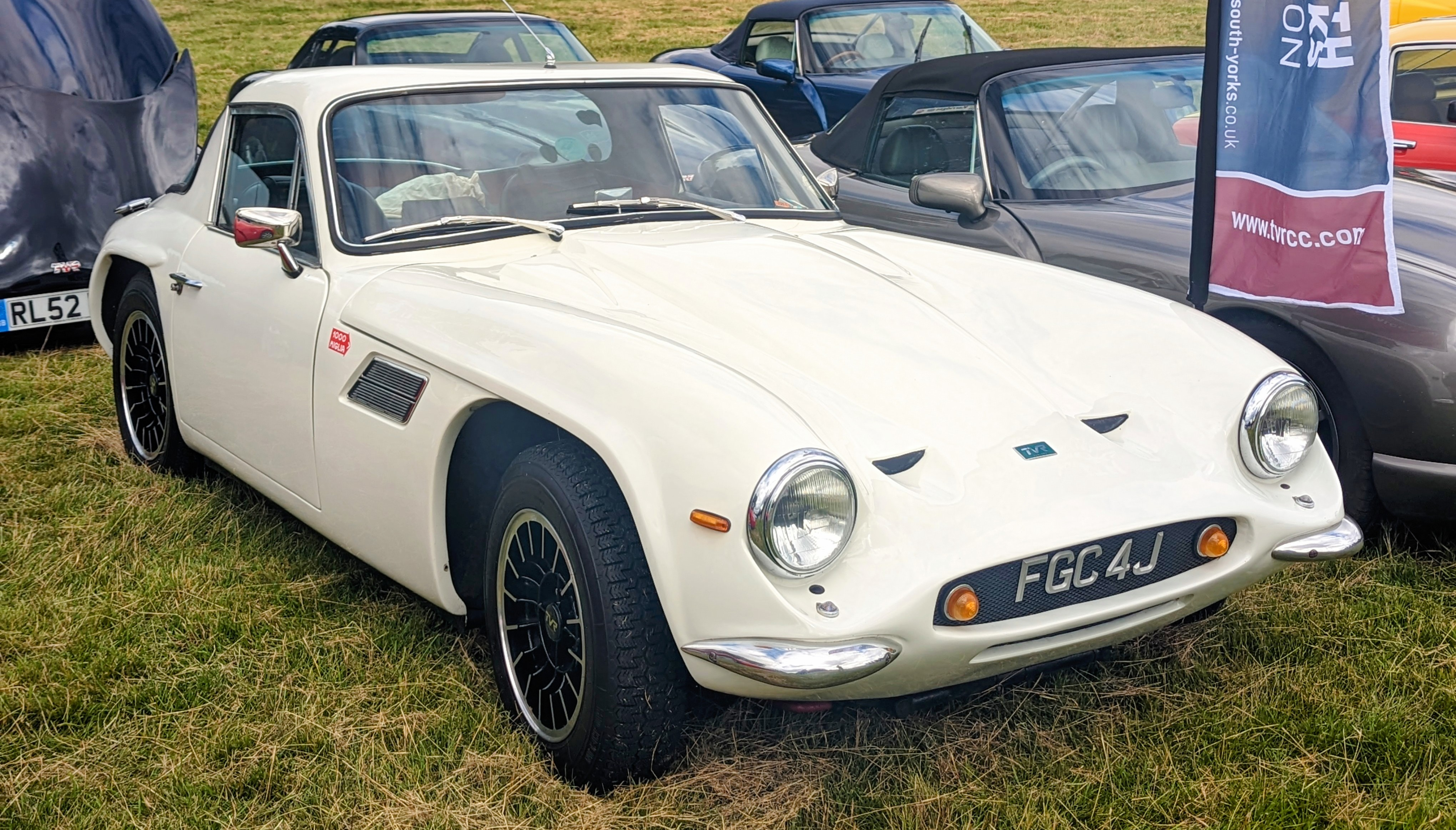
1970 TVR Vixen (S3)

The S3 continued to improve the car with a number of detail changes. The heat extraction vents on the flanks behind the front wheels were decorated with "Aeroflow" grilles borrowed from the c-pillars of the Ford Zodiac Mark IV, and the Ford four-cylinder engine was now in the same tune as in the Ford Capri, producing 92 bhp. Instead of wire wheels, cast alloy wheels were fitted as standard.

- Total S3 production: 165

Finally, the S4 cars were an interim model that used the TVR M Series chassis with the Vixen body shell. Apart from the chassis, there were no significant mechanical or cosmetic changes between the S3 and S4. Twenty-two were built in 1972 and one in 1973.

- Total S4 production: 23

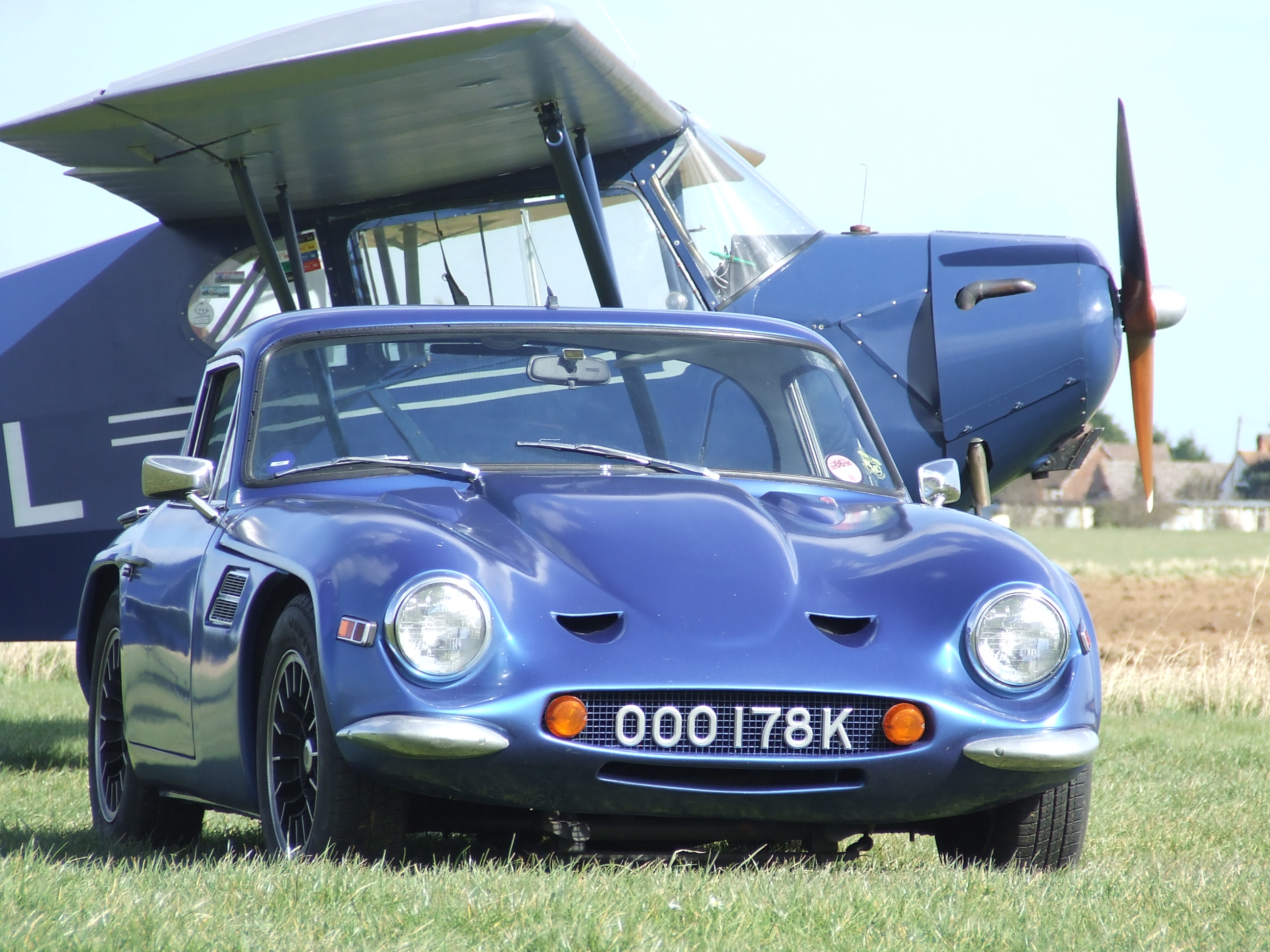
1971 TVR 1300 (Vixen), number 2 of 9 such cars made.

The 1300 model arrived in late 1971 and was built in an attempt to fill an "economy" market segment for sports cars. It was powered by a 1296 cc Standard SC engine from the Triumph Spitfire engine making 63 bhp (47 kW), and its lackluster performance limited its sales success. Top speed was barely 90 mph (145 km/h). Only fifteen were built, most in 1972. The final six of these cars were built on the M Series chassis, the very last of which was also built with M Series bodywork, although it never received a "1300M" designation.

- Total 1300 production: 15

Not to be confused with the later 2500M, the 2500 (marketed as the Vixen 2500 in the United States) was built between 1971 and 1972, and was designed to take advantage of the fact that the Triumph 2.5L inline-six engine had already been certified for US emissions standards (although only in 105 bhp form.) The final production run of the 2500 (comprising 96 cars) used the M Series chassis with Vixen-style bodywork.

- Total 2500 production: 385

=== Tuscan ===
A more powerful range of cars was also built using the Tuscan nameplate. These took over after the earlier TVR Griffith and were originally available only with a V8 engine, although later a lower-priced V6-engined alternative appeared. The Tuscan was built from 1967 until 1971.
