= TVR Typhon =

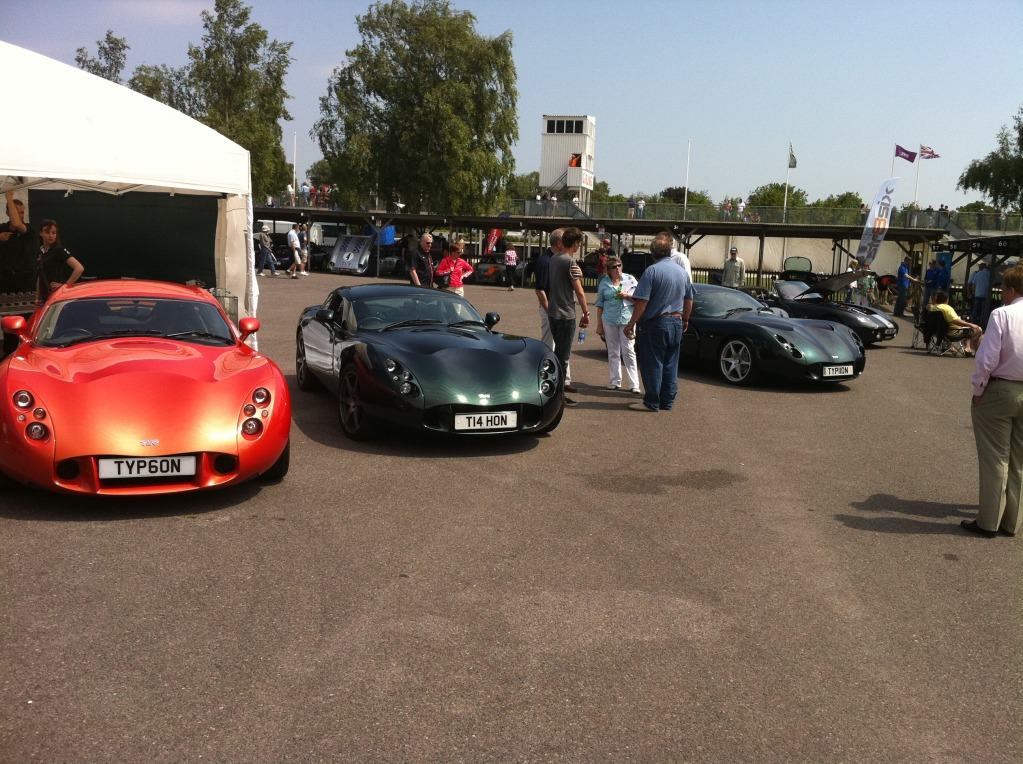
- The 3 TVR Typhons

Overview
- Manufacturer: TVR
- Production: 2000–2006; 3 produced
- Assembly: United Kingdom: Blackpool, England
- Designer: Graham Browne

Body and chassis
- Class: Sports Car
- Body style: 2-door coupe
- Layout: FR layout
- Related: TVR T400R

Powertrain
- Engine: 4.0 L or 4.2 L TVR Speed Six I6
- Transmission: 5 speed manual 6 speed sequential

The TVR Typhon is a sports car produced by the British company TVR in their factory in Blackpool between 2000 and 2006. It is the fastest production TVR ever built (the earlier TVR Cerbera Speed 12 was never put into production), and only three were ever built. All are currently in England.

In the late 1990s, Peter Wheeler began the project that would fulfil his ambition to see TVRs at Le Mans. An entirely new car was going to be needed. It would need to be built using modern composites, be more rigid than any previous TVR and designed for 200 mph (322 km/h) on the Mulsanne Straight, to be stable and above all, to win.

And so began what started labelled as the TuscanR (TVR T400R) and finally resulted in the 200 MPH+ Typhon the fastest and most expensive production car in TVR's history.

== History ==
There is often confusion over the naming of this project. While the project itself was focused and singular, its naming was more typical of TVR. The car itself would be a steel tubular frame with full roll cage forming the backbone to a full carbon fibre monocoque. While larger than any previous road TVR, it would be lighter, stiffer and much stronger. New suspension designs were implemented and professional CAD design and aero testing ensured a shape that would be stable at 200 mph (322 km/h).

It began life as the TuscanR (TVR T400R) (following the Tuscan racers (TVR Tuscan Challenge) that the cars were to replace). This was a two-seater, composite race/road car. There was one road car prototype built in 2001 which was displayed during its lifetime (it was cut up and destroyed) in two colours, purple and silver. The rear lights of this car differ from those that followed. The early TVR T400R racers had this design.

Between 2000 and 2004 TVR built a total of seven race cars and six or seven road cars. Of the latter, the 2001 prototype (since scrapped) had the TuscanR body but from 2002 the other cars were of T400R design. The road cars had no standard interior as these were specified by the customers.

Shortly after TVR built the two road-going prototypes (the homologation cars) the project name changed. Originally both badged as TuscanR, the FIA rules for Le Mans stipulated that there had to be two models so in 2002 the red car was rebranded as the T400R and the Fleetwood Brown car as the T440R (the latter with a 4.2L S6 opposed to the 4.0), named for the proposed BHP outputs of the models, and priced at £71,995 and £74,995 respectively. The road project would also offer a two-seater car with a long-range race tank or a 2+2 with a standard-sized (51L) tank.

When TVR delivered the first (and only) T440 customer car they announced that all cars would be 2+2 and with the longer range fuel tank (70L). The monocoque design had also been altered to offer better side impact protection. At the same time they announced the birth of the Typhon (in late 2003 named the T550R). The Typhon would be a supercharged 4.0L T440 with larger brakes and the option of a sequential gearbox over the standard 5SP manual. It would also run 'sequential' injection, instead of the traditional 'batch' of other S6 cars. The T400R badge was dropped as the new Typhon model would retain the two-model line-up required by the FIA. The red T400R was seen briefly with the T440R badge before being re-styled in the De Walt colours and used as a Le Mans promotional vehicle. This car is owned by Richard Stanton and is currently being recommissioned at TVR101.

Before any customer Typhons could be delivered, Peter Wheeler sold TVR; and the general development of both the race cars, the T440 and the Typhon was halted. With no race cars to support, the T440R badge was also dropped at this time, leaving just the Typhon brand name to cover both NA and FI road cars.

The orange Typhon was fitted with the TVR Vortech supercharger and the in-house designed and built sequential box and went on to be retained by the factory as the development mule for the ill-fated Typhoon project. In 2004 during testing, the engine was found to produce over 600BHP. Over the course of 2005, TVR stated that excessive heat from the supercharger was a cause of delivery delays but the closure of the Composites Department around that time suggests that this was a story to mask the deepening financial woes of the company. It was clear no more cars would be built by the factory and there was no budget available to complete the supercharger project.

The two Reflex Charcoal Typhons were fitted with Tuscan S 4.0 S6 engines and one was sold direct to a customer and the other used by the new owner of TVR until that too was sold on to a customer. While both these cars were road registered in 2006 and the orange car in 2004 they were all built at around the same time during 2003/4.

Originally priced at £84,995, by 2005 the end of production the Typhon was £134,995. The cars had cost far more in labour and development than had originally been anticipated. In addition, TVR also listed two 'Ultimate' options, the high-performance track day gearbox at £33,995 and the high-performance track day diff at £14,995: surprising options at a time when little sense emanated from the firm. One can only conclude they were priced to ensure that no one would ever ask for them.

The cars cost far more to build than ever anticipated which was why production after 2004 essentially halted.

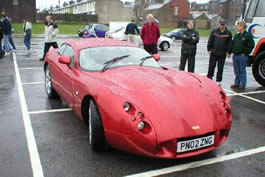
The first prototype. Originally badged as TuscanR, then T400R, finally T440R. Generally referred to as the T400R or De Walt car.

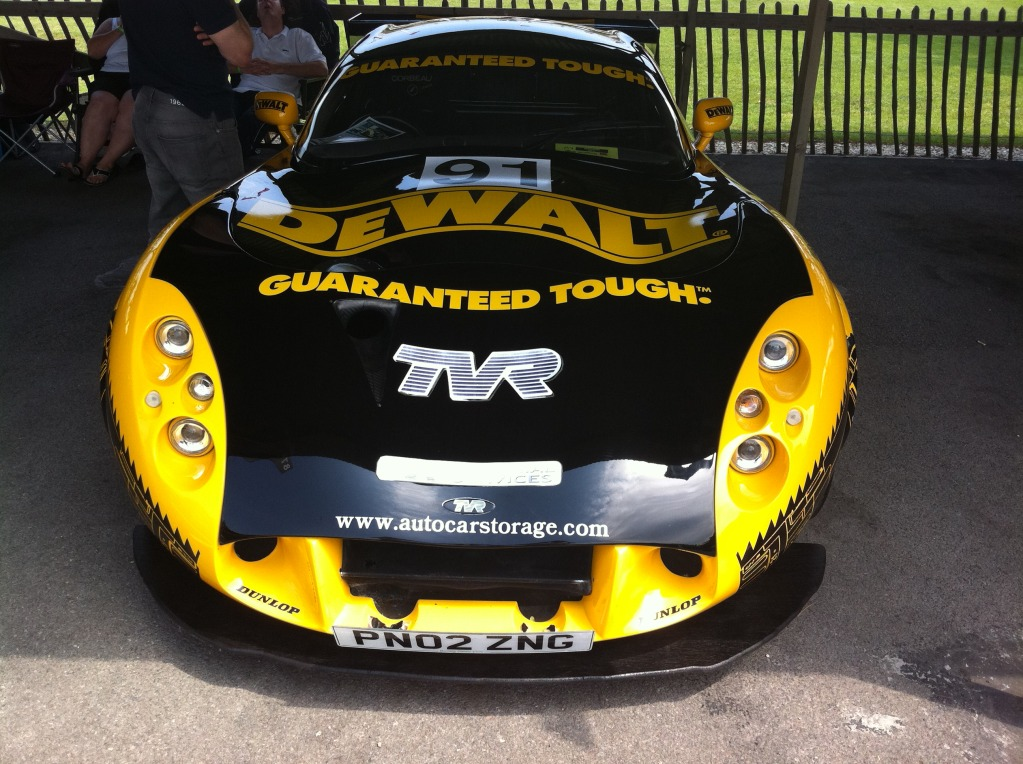
The T400R Prototype in De Walt colours. Used by TVR to promote the Le Mans series racing.

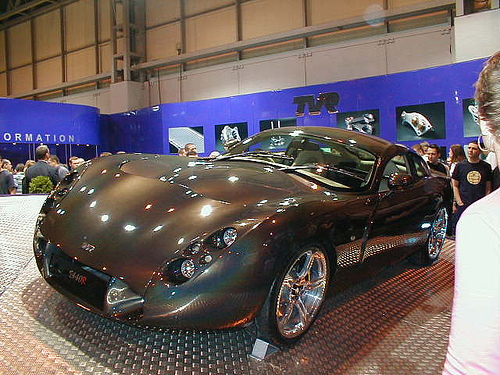
The T440R prototype. Like PN02, it was also seen with both TuscanR and T400R badges in 2001.

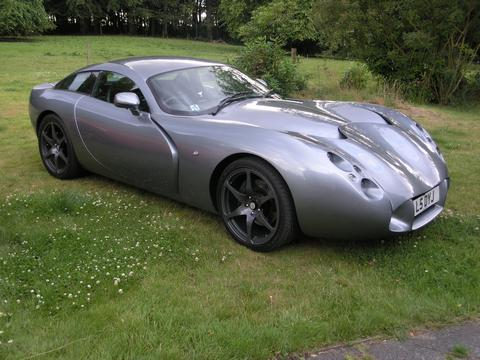
The T440R roadcar. Often referred to as 'LNT1' as it was originally Lawrence Tomlinson's car.

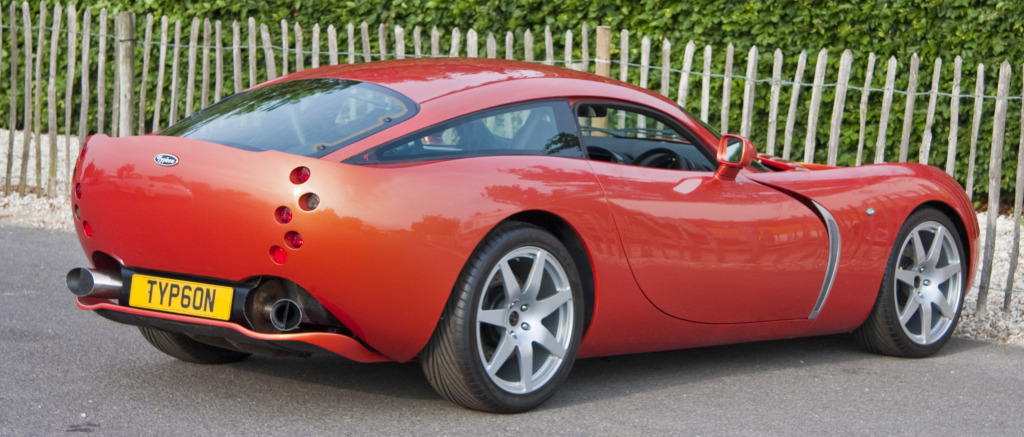
TVR Typhon (originally supercharged + sequential gearbox). Never delivered but retained by the factory until it closed. Privately owned since 2010.

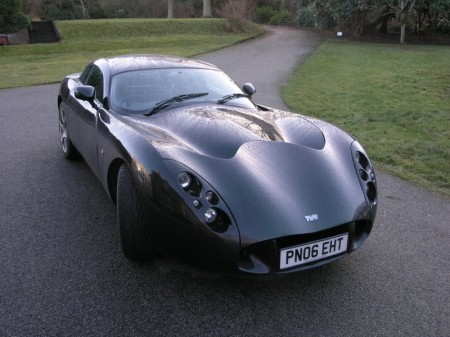
TVR Typhon (the original show car) This was the Reflex Charcoal car that did all the motor shows. Originally owned by post Peter Wheeler (TVR) era owner of TVR.

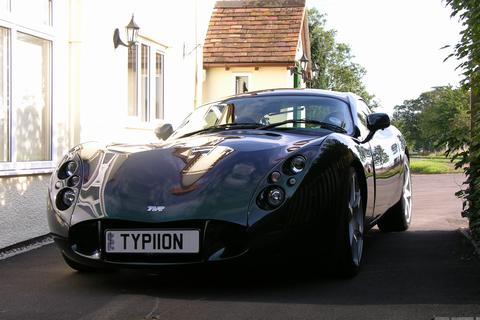
TVR Typhon Technically the only Typhon ever delivered directly to a private customer.

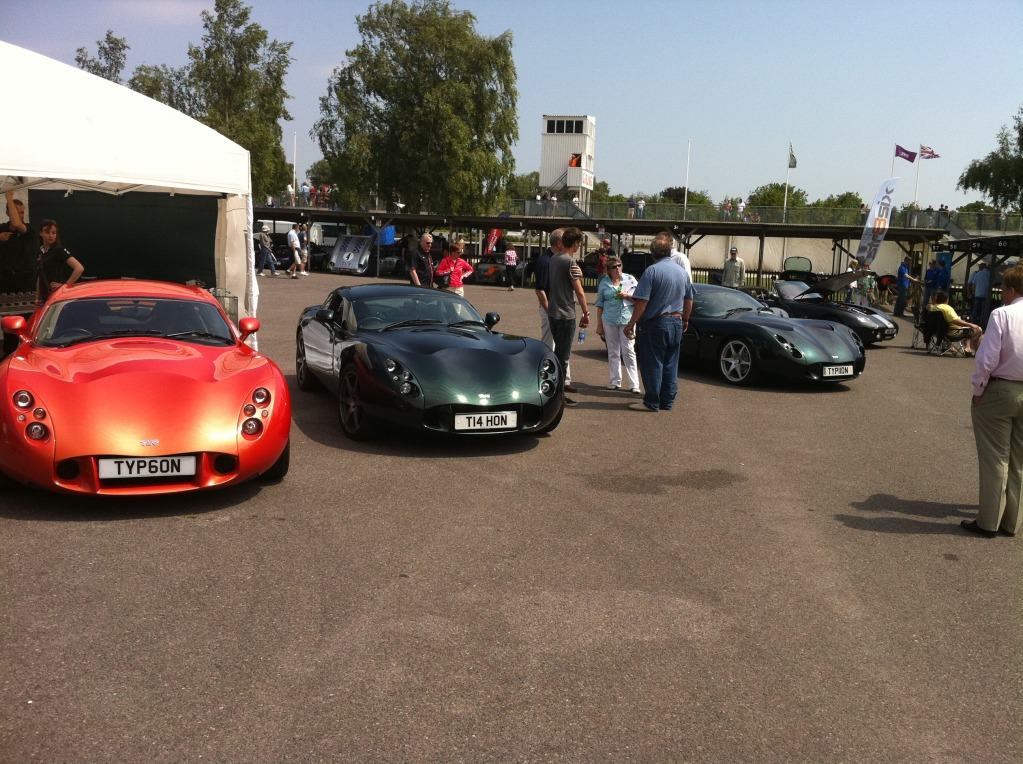
All 3 Typhons together. A Goodwood event in 2012. Only known time that they have all been together.

== Timeline ==
- 2000 – TuscanR prototype at NEC (Y276XBV)
- 2002 – two homologation TuscanRs built (PN02ZNG & PL03BXY)
- 2002 – Names changed to T400R & T440R to meet Le Mans FIA regulations
- 2003 – Typhon launched at MPH Show
- 2003 – T400R badge dropped.
- 2003 – T440R YC53GBW registered and delivered
- 2004 – Typhon AF04BYZ registered
- 2005 – TVR sold, racing program closed
- 2005 – T440R badge dropped
- 2006 – Typhons PN06EHT & PN06EHX registered and delivered
- 2011 – Typhon AF04BYZ back on the road

== Specifications ==
Engine

Engine (final) (proposed):

- TVR Speed Six, straight six, fuel injected (supercharged)
- Engine capacity: 4000 cc or 4200 cc (4000 cc supercharged)
- Power output: 400 bhp (4000 cc) or 440 bhp (4200 cc) (585 bhp in supercharged 4000 cc form)
- Torque output: unknown (467 lb/ft in supercharged 4000 cc form)

Transmission

Transmission: five speed manual gearbox (six speed sequential gearbox)

Suspension

Front: double wishbones with coil springs over adjustable gas dampers, anti-roll bar
Rear: double wishbones with coil springs over adjustable gas dampers, anti-roll bar

Brakes

Front: vented discs with 4-piston calipers with 322 mm brake rotors
Rear: vented discs with single-piston calipers and 298 mm brake rotors

Chassis/Body

Body: carbon fibre mono shell bonded around the entire chassis.
Chassis: tubular steel space frame with aluminium/carbon fibre reinforcement, integral steel roll cage, all bonded into the composite shell

Performance

Acceleration: 0–62 mph (100 km/h): under 4.0 seconds
Top speed: approx. 200 mph (215 mph+ for supercharged variant)

Dimensions

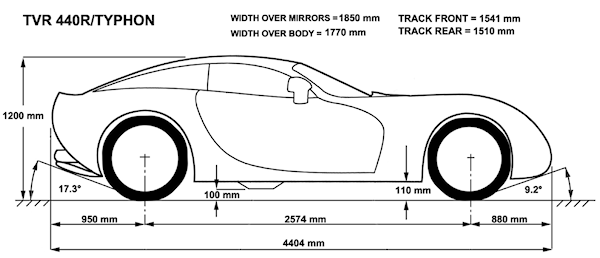
