= TVR Tuscan Challenge =

- Category: One-make racing
- Country: United Kingdom
- Inaugural season: 1989
- Constructors: TVR

TVR Tuscan Challenge
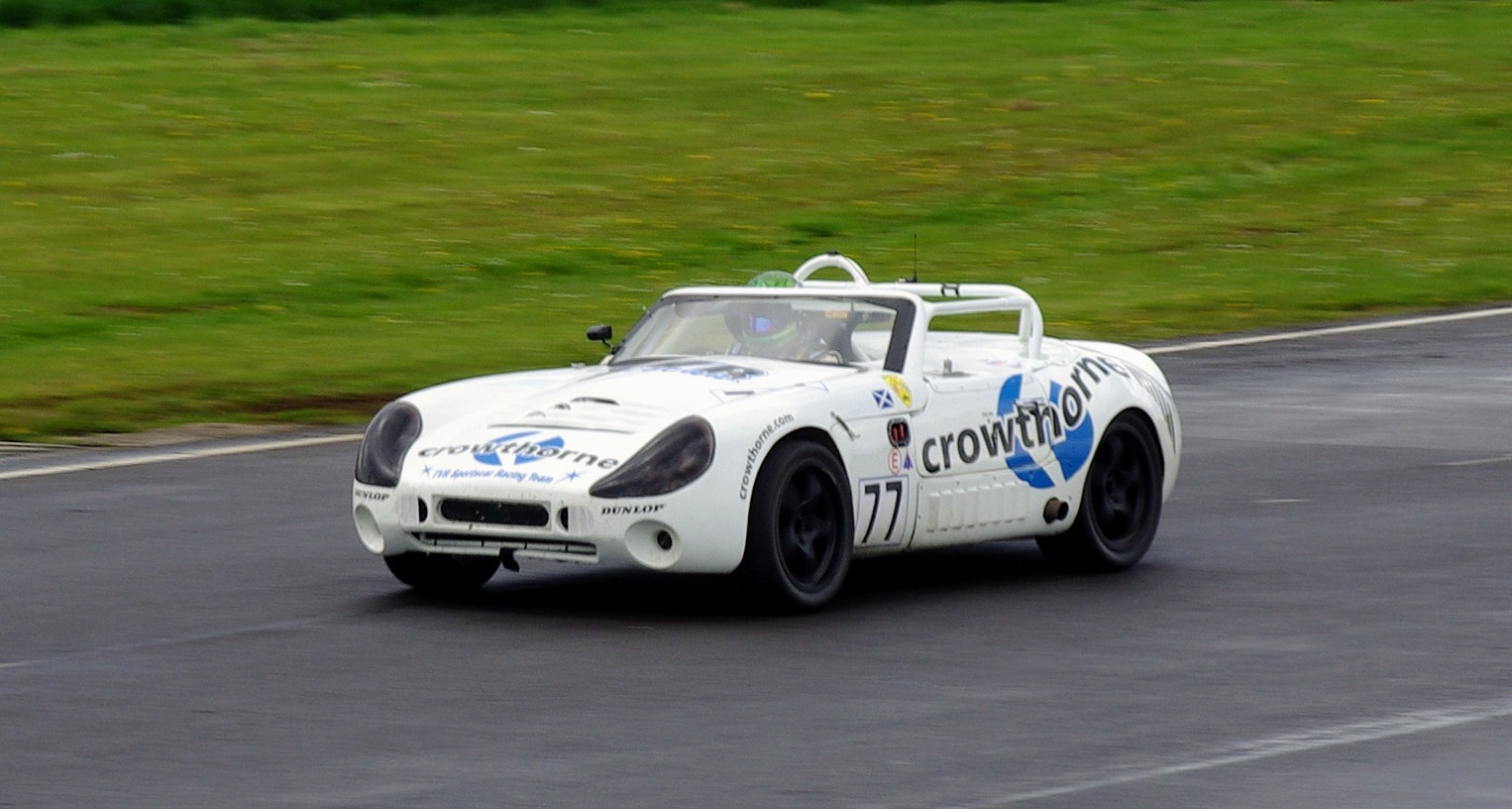

Overview
- Manufacturer: TVR
- Also called: TVR Tuscan Racer
- Production: 1989 (43 produced)
- Assembly: England: Blackpool

Body and chassis
- Class: Sports/racing car
- Body style: 2-door roadster
- Layout: Front-engine, rear-wheel-drive
- Platform: Fiberglass body over tubular steel chassis
- Related: TVR Sagaris; TVR Tuscan Speed Six

Powertrain
- Engine: 4.4 L (4,441 cc) Rover V8; 4.5 L (4,500 cc) TVR Speed Eight
- Power output: 348–450 hp (260–336 kW)
- Transmission: 5-speed Borg Warner T5 manual

Dimensions
- Wheelbase: 2,336 mm (92.0 in)
- Length: 3,937 mm (155.0 in)
- Width: 1,740 mm (68.5 in)
- Height: 1,184 mm (46.6 in)
- Curb weight: 850 kg (1,874 lb)

Chronology
- Successor: TVR T400R

The TVR Tuscan Challenge is a one-make series dedicated to the second incarnation of the TVR Tuscan sports car (Initially developed as a road car and then built for the race series), and takes place throughout the United Kingdom. Inaugurated in 1989, its high power-to-weight ratio, capability of reaching 190 mph (310 km/h) and loud engine noise, combined with close racing in a field consisting of over 30 cars at its peak, made the series become, at the time, the premier one-make series in the UK with an extensive TV coverage; over the years, many drivers who competed in the series moved on in major championship series and many notable drivers have guest driven in a race. The company underwent management changes in 2005, and the TVR Tuscan Challenge was merged with its owner club's series, which has been reformatted to allow for all TVR models.

== History ==
With the success of the S Series, TVR began development of the ES', an S series sports car with a 4.4-litre Rover V8 engine. The car was unveiled in prototype form at the 1988 British Motorshow with plans for it to be developed for road use, but in order to attract public interests and stimulate sales, TVR resurrected the Tuscan name and at the same time instigated the one-make TVR Tuscan Challenge series.

In order to attract more customers, TVR offered the first batch at a discount of £16,000 plus VAT for entrants with a condition that they commit themselves to compete at least six of the twelve races in the championship. Should that fail, the purchaser would agree to pay the discounted amount at the end of the season.

With the instant success of the series in its first year in 1989, plans for a road car were cancelled as TVR was busy with the 'S' and the older wedge models as well as with the design and development work for the forthcoming Griffith and Chimaera models.

The road car never went beyond the motor show prototype stage, and the Tuscans continued to be produced in small volumes as racing cars.

The S based chassis had to be developed to cope with the large power output of the tuned Rover V8 engine; by the end of its development, it ended up being a completely new chassis with a wider track, increased wheelbase and much strengthening.

From the debut race in 1989, Tuscan Challenge racers were powered by a TVR Power developed 4.5 litre variant of the Rover V8 with a power output of over 400 hp (298 kW). This was transmitted through a Borg Warner T5 gearbox to its nine-inch (229 mm) wide sixteen-inch (406 mm) O.Z. split-rim wheels with Dunlop cross-ply racing tyres. In the late 1980's, as the aging Rover V8 was getting beyond its development limits and Rover's takeover by BMW, plus the then company owner Peter Wheeler's rumoured refusal of having German engines in his cars, Wheeler commissioned engine designer Al Melling to develop, supported by the internal TVR engineer John Ravenscroft, the new AJPV8 engine, (4.5L flat crank), rated at a higher power output level than its Rover counterpart. With the new V8 engine, the TVR Tuscan Challenge car (some of the car raced the championship were selected to fit it for testing that of the owner Peter Wheeler and that of the Chief of the TVR Motorsport Department John Reid who built all the racing cars, and others), was capable accelerating to 97 km/h in over 3 seconds and 0-124 km/h in 6.9 seconds. The cars boasted of 536 hp (400 kW) per tonne with a claimed top speed in excess of 306 km/h (190 mph) All engines were factory supplied sealed units to ensure a levelled playing field.

Dealers were usually encouraged to enter the series with company management including owner Peter Wheeler and managing director, Ben Samuelson also competing in the series. Wheeler used his expertise to develop the Speed 12. Many drivers who are now competing in the Le Mans Series, FIA GT Championship and 24 Hours of Le Mans, such as Jamie Campbell-Walter, Bobby Verdon-Roe, Martin Short and Michael Caine, developed their skills in the series. Nigel Mansell was to compete for a one off race at Donington Park in 1993 but was unable to after he was hospitalised following a BTCC incident. Other notable drivers who have guest driven in the series throughout its history include Colin McRae, Andy Wallace, Tim Harvey, Anthony Reid, Tiff Needell and John Cleland.

Carlube sponsored the series between 2002 and 2004. The series was now renamed Dunlop TVR Challenge. At the end of 2003, a version of the T350 known as the Sagaris was introduced with an intention to run alongside the racing Tuscan and to eventually replace them. But when Peter Wheeler sold the company to Nikolay Smolensky, the new owner abruptly ended factory support before the 2005 season had begun. TVR's Motorsport Director acquired the rights and kept the series going but on a much smaller basis; by then, TVR had sold off all its racer cars. With waning entries, many of these cars had either been converted to road use or ended up in track days, the series would continue under a new format as it merged with the Toolsnstuff.co.uk/SIP TVRCC Challenge Cup, a smaller series that consists of a wide range of TVR models, meaning that the grid now featured a more diverse range of TVR models in one race and the series split into three categories.

In 2006, the series acquired a new sponsor, Dunlop Tyres, which meant it provides the tyres, giving a leeway for drivers to decide if they want to compete on slicks, road or track tyres and not just restricted to TVR's; the series now had an Invitation Class for any make of sports car providing that it complies with the MSA regulations for the original championship it was built to race in.

Many of the race cars have found their way competing outside the series, and some of them have been converted into a Sagaris clone as they share similar parts and are the same dimensions. Driver Michel Mora used a Tuscan Challenge in the FFSA GT Championship from 1999 to 2001, before being joined by a second car from Massimo Cairati, developed by Fisconsult managed from Avv. Vito Gianfranco Truglia in order to promote the brand for road car sales on the Italian market. Cairati also ran Avv. Truglia's car in select rounds of the Italian GT Championship that year, winning both manches in Mugello race and finishing ninth in the overall drivers championship and second in his class.

Due to the Tuscan Challenge's participation in national grand tourer series in the 1990s, the cars were made eligible for the GT90s Revival Series, a historic racing series. Two Tuscan Challenges raced at the series' first round at Silverstone.

== Categories ==
Class position depends on the engine capacity, power output and car development. There were currently four categories:

- Class A+ (Super A) - Reserved for predominantly larger capacity TVR GT cars with aerodynamic aids (such as wings, splitters and flat floors) sequential gearboxes and traction control. Cars that don't fit into A, B, or C categories.
- Class A - Consists mainly of the AJPV8 powered Tuscans. Turbo cars up to 3.0 litres and more than 300 hp (224 kW) normally aspirated cars with 5.0 litres or more than the above mentioned power output. No aerodynamic aids allowed.
- Class B - Consists mainly of the Rover V8 Tuscans and TVR road converted cars. Turbocharged cars up to 3.0 litres with less than 300 hp (224 kW), normally aspirated cars between 3.0-5.0 litres and less than 300 hp (224 kW). Aerodynamic aids currently allowed.
- Class C - Consists mainly of the production based converted road cars such as stock 4.0 L Rover V8 cars such as Chimearas/Griffiths and highly tuned V6 Race Tasmins. Normally aspirated cars up to 3.0 litres. Only the modified 4- or 6-cylinder and standard Rover V8 engine are eligible.

== Road going versions ==
The Tuscan was originally intended as a road car, and two road cars were produced with sales brochures printed. However, with the development of the Griffith and the success of the race series, plans to put the road car into production ceased. Despite this there was still a demand for road going Tuscan race cars and a number of owners have converted race cars for road use.

Conversions includes installation of a speedometer (as racing cars do not have them), changes to the lighting system, having the chassis powder-coated, relocating the fuel tank from the original driver's side to the rear of the car to allow for a passenger seat and conversions to protect the fuel cell in an event of an accident. Also installation of traction control is considered to be an option. However obtaining the car plus the prohibitive cost of conversion at £10,000 and the complication of the task makes finding such a model on a public road a rare find.

Many of the converted Tuscans which house the AJP8 engines have engines that are commonly sourced from accident damaged Cerberas as race engines are leased by the factories, though the Rover V8s of the earlier cars can be easily sourced.
