= TVR T400R =

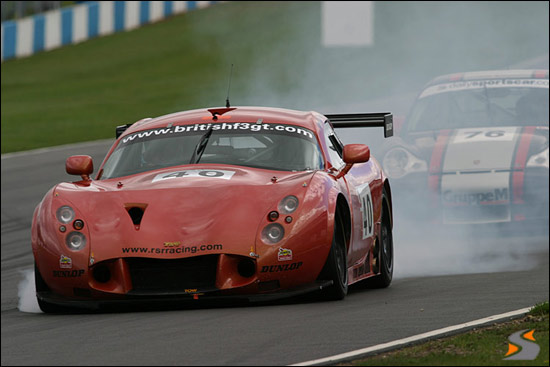
- T400R in British GT at Donington Park

Overview
- Manufacturer: TVR
- Production: 2000–2004 (7 cars produced)
- Designer: Graham Browne

Body and chassis
- Class: Race Car
- Body style: 2-door coupe
- Layout: FR layout
- Related: TVR Typhon

Powertrain
- Engine: TVR Speed Six

Chronology
- Predecessor: TVR Tuscan Challenge; TVR Cerbera Speed 12

In the late 1990s, the successful Tuscan Challenge race series was in need of updating and Peter Wheeler began the project that would fulfill his ambition to see TVRs at Le Mans. Work began on a completely new racing car that would be built using modern composites, be more rigid than any previous TVR and be CAD designed to reach speeds in excess of 200 mph (322 km/h) and be stable. The car itself would be a steel tubular frame with full roll cage forming the backbone to a full carbon fibre monocoque.

By 2000 work was well under way on the carbon fibre TuscanR GT car.

== History ==
Typical of TVR there was to be a change of name during the early stages of the production run. Originally it began life as the TuscanR (A natural follow on from the infamous Tuscan Racers (TVR Tuscan Challenge) that the cars were to replace) but as TVR launched the T350 road car it was deemed that the racers should be referred going forward as T400R. At this same time a few cosmetic changes were made to the shell, most notably the design of the rear light cluster changed from a single top corner unit per side to a set of smaller, individual, circular lights down each side.

Between 2000 and 2004 TVR built a total of 7 race cars. The first three race cars were of the TuscanR design but the last 4, (the 2 DeWalt cars delivered in 2003 and the 2 RSR cars in 2004) were T400R body shape (The difference being the rear light housings mainly). Earlier racers in some situations have the later rear, probably due to work after 'racing incidents'.

Racing commenced in 2001 with the final T400Rs racing in the 2006 Le Mans Series season.

== The race cars ==
The success of the Tuscan Racer series through the 90s had been highly beneficial to the company and their first attempt to build a GT1 class car and associated road cars, the Speed 12 project and the Cerbera Speed 12 project had introduced TVR to some modern composites and techniques but Wheeler had been experimenting with Kevlar and carbon fibre since the SEAC models of the late 1980s. The GT1 projects themselves did not succeed and in traditional TVR style, Wheeler announced that the 800BHP+ road cars would be too dangerous for normal customers. At the time this car was, on paper, the fastest production car in the world.

All this work lead to the creation of the TuscanR, nee T400R, racing project. Between 2000 and 2004 TVR built 7 racing chassis that were campaigned right up until 2006 with great success considering the competition.

Most importantly, chassis' 1, 4 & 5 raced at Le Mans. Chassis 4 & 5 raced in both 2003 and 2004 and the most continuously campaigned and most well known chassis 1 in 2005.

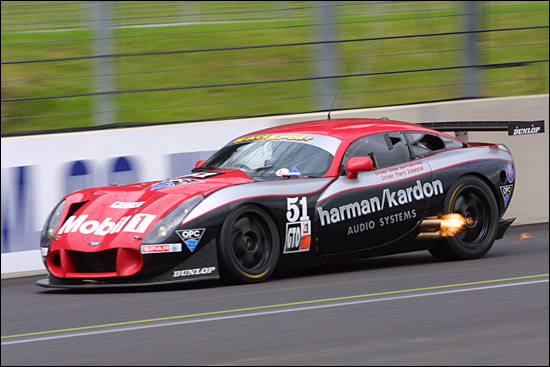
TVR TuscanR/T400R RaceSports Salisbury 2002

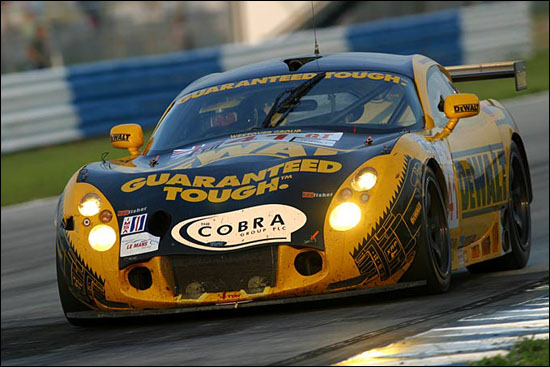
TVR TuscanR/T400R

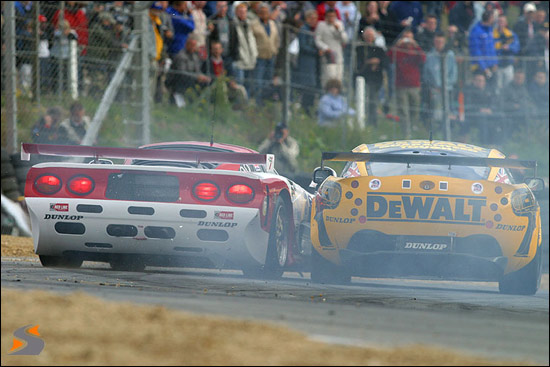
TVR TuscanR/T400R

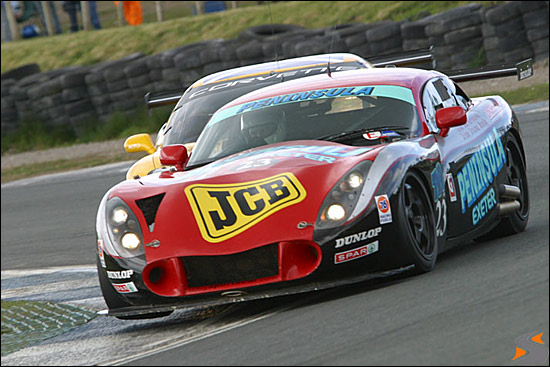
TVR TuscanR/T400R Peninsula TVR

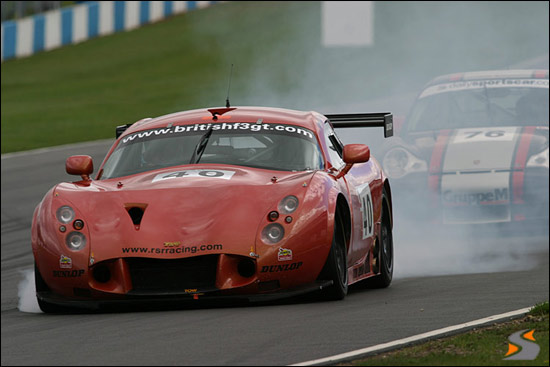
TVR TuscanR/T400R RSR Racing 2004

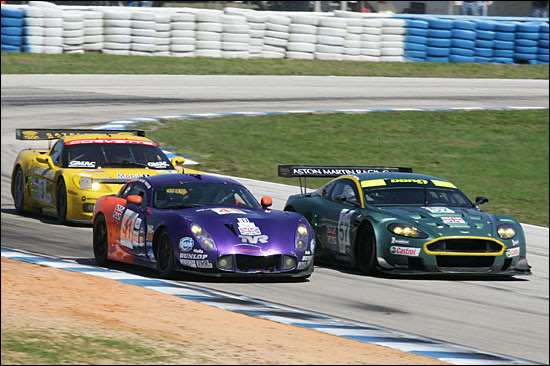
TVR TuscanR/T400R Team LNT 2005

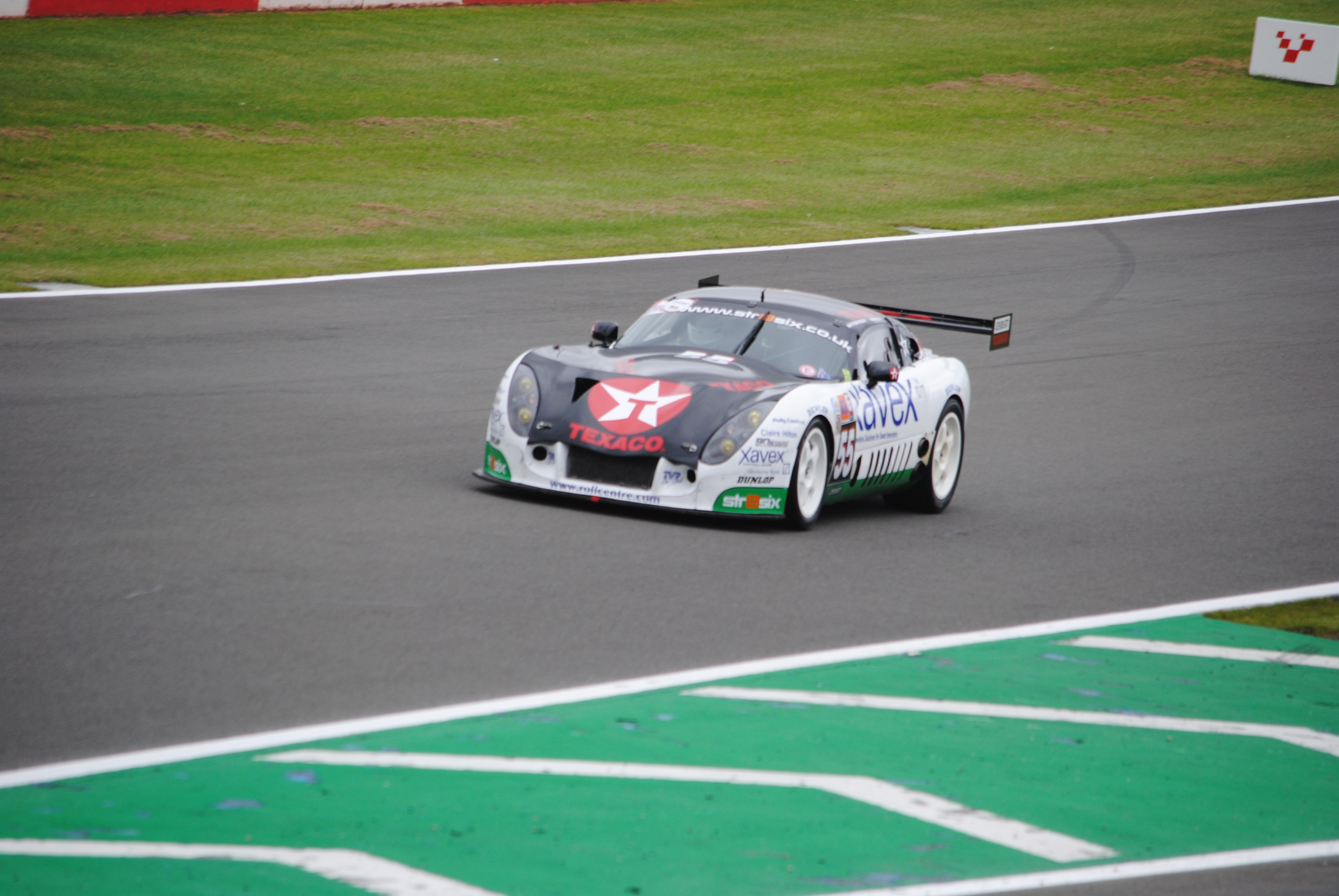
TVR TuscanR/T400R Rollcentre Racing 2019
