= Bobby Verdon-Roe =

British racing driver (born 1965)

- Nationality: (United Kingdom) British
- Born: Robert Geoffrey Verdon-Roe; 21 November 1965 (age 60) Winchester, England

Racing career
- Starts: TBC
- Wins: TBC
- Poles: TBC

Previous series
- 2011 2010 2009 2005 2004 2003 2002 2001 2000 1999 1998 1998 1997 1993 1992 1991 1990 1989 1988: Historic Formula One Championship; Historic Formula One Championship; Historic Formula One Championship; 24 Hours of Le Mans; FIA GT Championship; FIA GT Championship; FIA GT Championship; British GT Championship; British GT Championship; FIA GT Championship; British GT Championship; TVR Tuscan Challenge; TVR Tuscan Challenge; BTCC; BTCC; Formula Renault; Formula Renault; British Formula Ford Championship; Formula First

Championship titles
- 2011 2010 2009 1997 1991: Historic Formula One Championship; Historic Formula One Championship; Historic Formula One Championship; Tuscan Challenge; Formula Renault

Robert Geoffrey Verdon-Roe (born 21 November 1965 in Winchester, Hampshire) is a British racing driver who has raced in various formats of motor sport throughout his career. He has won Formula Renault, TVR Tuscan and Historic Formula One Championships.

Verdon-Roe is the grandson of Sir Alliott Verdon Roe who was a pioneer of British aviation and founder of the Avro aircraft company. He was educated at Ashdown House and Stowe School having been brought up in Portugal.

== Racing career ==
In 1988, Verdon-Roe started racing in single-seaters, with no previous karting experience. Verdon-Roe came third in the Formula First championship of 1988.

In 1989, Verdon-Roe moved into Formula Ford and finished third in the P&O European Ferries Championship behind David Coulthard and Kelvin Burt.

During 1990 and 1991, Verdon-Roe raced in Formula Renault, culminating with him winning the Championship in 1991 after a heated battle with Jason Plato. He was nominated for an Autosport Award.

In 1992, Verdon-Roe switched to touring cars with a drive in a Vauxhall Cavalier for the Ecurie Ecosse team in the British Touring Car Championship. He also raced in the latter half of the Formula Vauxhall Championship that year.

In 1993, Verdon-Roe drove a semi-works Toyota Carina E for the Park Lane Toyota Carina team. His best result that year was a 6th place at Snetterton and finished the championship down in 19th.

After a quiet spell which included a one-off race in Formula Three in 1994, Verdon-Roe returned to motorsport in the TVR Tuscan Challenge. In 1997, he won the TVR Tuscan championship overall and was nominated for an Autosport award. In 1998, he stayed with the factory team and finished a close 2nd in the championship and the same year, competed with the new TVR Speed 12 in the British GT Championship. He also had his first taste of Historic racing, teaming up with Gerry Marshall in a Jaguar E-Type at Silverstone, finishing third after gaining pole position.

In 1999, Verdon-Roe briefly raced for the Lister works team in the FIA GT Championship, before returning to TVR and racing their new Cerbera Speed 12 GT car in the British GT Championship in 2000 and 2001, winning three races and eventually finishing third in the championship.

Verdon-Roe also drove one-off races in the European Le Mans Series in 2001 in 2002. In 2002, he returned to the Lister team and raced the Lister Storm in the FIA GT Championship. Highlights included a second place at Silverstone and second place at the Spa 24 hours, Lister's best ever result in a 24-hour race.

In 2003, Verdon-Roe raced for the newly formed Creation Autosportif racing team driving the 2000 FIA GT Championship winning Lister Storm chassis (002) to fourth place in the FIA GT Championship.

In 2004, Verdon-Roe again raced for Creation at Donington Park and the Spa 24 Hours in the Lister. He also raced once in the British GT Championship for Rollcentre Racing in the Mosler MT900R. There were also a number of entries in various historic events including the Le Mans 24 Hours Group C support race and winning the Spa-Francorchamps Classic Endurance Race.

In 2005, Verdon-Roe raced in the Le Mans 24 hours race driving a Dallara Nissan LMP1 car for the Rollcentre team, as well as the Spa 24 Hours for the Lister team.

In 2008, Verdon-Roe won the Goodwood Revival's feature race, the RAC TT Celebration, driving a Ferrari 330 LMB with Peter Hardman, the first victory for a Ferrari in the TT since the Revival began.

In 2009, Verdon-Roe won FIA Historic Formula One Championship driving a McLaren M26. At the Revival, he shared the Ferrari 330 LMB with Emanuele Pirro, finishing second.

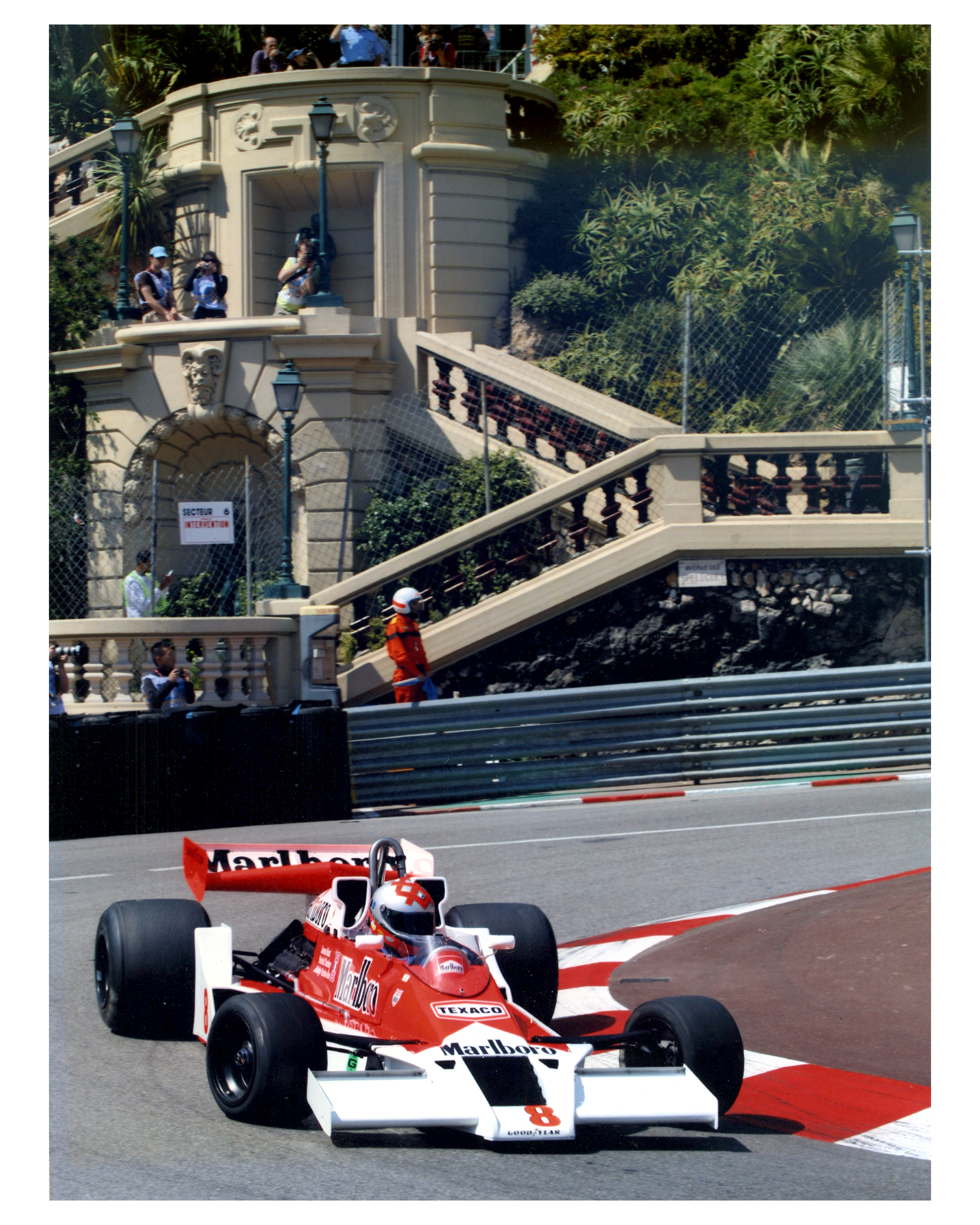
Verdon-Roe 2010 Historic Grand Prix of Monaco

In 2010, Verdon-Roe won the Grand Prix Historique of Monaco aboard the ex-James Hunt McLaren.

Verdon-Roe also won the FIA Historic Formula One championship ground effect class and finished second overall driving a McLaren MP4/1B. At the Goodwood Revival, he shared the Ferrari with Tom Kristensen, but retired having started from pole position.

In 2011, Verdon-Roe again finished second overall in the FIA Historic Formula One Championship and won the ground effect class in the ex-Niki Lauda McLaren. At the Revival, he raced Aston Martin DBR1-2 to 2nd place in the Sussex Trophy.

In 2012, Verdon-Roe finished second in the Grand Prix Historique of Monaco and second in Goodwood Revival's TT Celebration race driving a Jaguar E-type.

In 2015, Verdon-Roe won the Sussex trophy in the Ferrari Dino 246S at the Goodwood Revival. In 2021, he finished fifth with Martin Brundle in the AC Cobra known as Snakeyes in the RAC TT at the Goodwood Revival. In 2022, Verdon-Roe finished seventh with Alex Brundle in the AC Cobra known as Snakeyes in the RAC TT at the Goodwood Revival. In 2023, Verdon-Roe finished ninth, after it rained, in Snakeyes, with Alex Brundle in the RAC TT at the Goodwood Revival. In 2024, Verdon-Roe finished fourth in Snakeyes with Andre Lotterer in the RAC TT at the Goodwood Revival.

== Racing record ==
=== Formula Renault Championship Results ===
(key) (Races in bold indicate pole position) (Races in italics indicate fastest lap)

Year	Team	Car	1	2	3	4	5	6	7	8	9	10	11	12	Pos	Points
1991	Fortec Motorsport	Van Diemen RF91	Oulton Park 3rd	Silverstone 2nd	Thruxton 3rd	Brands Hatch 4th	Oulton Park 2nd	Snetterton 2nd	Mallory Park 1st	Donington Park 1st	Cadwell Park 1st	Brands Hatch DSQ	Knockhill 1st	Thruxton 3rd	1st	xx

=== Complete British Touring Car Championship results ===
(key) (Races in bold indicate pole position) (Races in italics indicate fastest lap)

Year	Team	Car	1	2	3	4	5	6	7	8	9	10	11	12	13	14	15	16	17	Pos	Pts
1992	Ecurie Ecosse Vauxhall	Vauxhall Cavalier	SIL; 11	THR; 16	OUL; 7	SNE; 13	BRH; 9	DON; 1; 11	DON; 2; 9	SIL; 8	KNO; 1 Ret	KNO; 2 Ret	PEM	BRH; 1	BRH; 2	DON	SIL			14th	9
1993	Park Lane Toyota Junior Team	Toyota Carina E	SIL; 14	DON; Ret	SNE; 6	DON; 12	OUL; 7	BRH; 1; 8	BRH; 2; 15	PEM; 15	SIL; 12	KNO; 1 Ret	KNO; 2 Ret	OUL; 13	BRH; 17	THR; 17	DON; 1 Ret	DON; 2 DNS	SIL; Ret	19th	11

=== British Formula 3 ===
(key) (Races in bold indicate pole position) (Races in italics indicate fastest lap)

Year	Team	Car	1	2	3	4	5	6	7	8	9	10	11	12	Pos	Points
1994	DAW Racing	Dallara F393	Silverstone DNF	xx												

=== 24 Hours of Le Mans results ===
Year	Team	Co-Drivers	Car	Class	Laps	Pos.	Class Pos.
2005	(United Kingdom) Rollcentre Racing	(Germany) Michael Krumm (Switzerland) Harold Primat	Dallara SP1-Nissan	LMP1	133	DNF	DNF

=== 24 Hours of Daytona Results ===
Year	Team	Co-Drivers	Car	Class	Laps	Pos.	Class Pos.
2002	(United Kingdom) Graham Nash Motorsport	(United Kingdom) Bobby Verdon-Roe (United Kingdom) Ian McKellar (Brazil) Thomas Erdos (United States) Ron Johnson	Saleen S7-R-Ford 6.9L V8	GTS	428	39th	7th

=== FIA GT Championship Results ===
(key) (Races in bold indicate pole position) (Races in italics indicate fastest lap)

Year	Team	Co-Drivers	Car	Class	1	2	3	4	5	6	7	8	9	10	11	12	13	Pos	Points
1999	Lister Storm Racing	(United Kingdom) Bobby Verdon-Roe (United Kingdom) Julian Bailey (United Kingdom) Tiff Needell	Lister Storm GTM	GT1	Monza Ret	Silverstone GP Ret													
2001	Lister Storm Racing	(United Kingdom) Bobby Verdon-Roe (Scotland) Jamie Campbell-Walter	Lister Storm GTM	GT	Jarama ESP Ret	Estoril PT 2nd													
2002	Lister Storm Racing	(United Kingdom) Bobby Verdon-Roe (United Kingdom) Paul Knapfield (Spain) Miguel Angel de Castro (Belgium) David Sterckx (United Kingdom) Justin Law (United Kingdom) Ian McKellar (United Kingdom) David Warnock	Lister Storm GTM	GT	Magny Cours Ret	Silverstone 2nd	Spa 24 hours 2nd												
2003	Creation Autosportif	(United Kingdom) Bobby Verdon-Roe (United Kingdom) Peter Snowdon (Italy) Marco Zadra (Netherlands) Duncan Huisman	Lister Storm GTM	GT	Barcelona 4th	Magny Cours 15th	Enna Pergusa 4th	Brno 6th	Donington 5th	Spa 24 hours DNF	Anderstorp DNF	Oschersleben 2nd	Estoril DNF	Monza 8th				4th =	30
2004	Creation Autosportif	(United Kingdom) Bobby Verdon-Roe (Scotland) Jamie Campbell-Walter (United Kingdom) Peter Snowdon (United Kingdom) Jamie Derbyshire	Lister Storm	GT				Donington DNF	Spa 24 hours DNF										
2005	Lister Storm Racing	(United Kingdom) Bobby Verdon-Roe (United Kingdom) Justin Keen (United States) Liz Halliday (Denmark) Jens Moller	Lister Storm	GT					Spa 24 hours										
2005	Konrad Motorsport	(United Kingdom) Bobby Verdon-Roe (Germany) Harald Becker	Saleen S7-R	GT	Monza 17th														

=== Complete British GT Championship results ===
(key) (Races in bold indicate pole position) (Races in italics indicate fastest lap)

Year	Team	Co-Drivers	Car	Class	1	2	3	4	5	6	7	8	9	10	11	12	13	Pos	Points
1998	TVR Engineering	(United Kingdom) Bobby Verdon-Roe (United Kingdom) Martin Short (United Kingdom) John Kent	TVR Cerbera Speed 12	GT1	SIL; 1	OUL; 1	CRO; 1	SNE; 1; 4	SIL; 1; 7	DON; 1; 9	SIL; 1 DNS	SPA; 1	SIL; 1						
2000	TVR Engineering	(United Kingdom) Bobby Verdon-Roe (United Kingdom) Ian McKellar	TVR Cerbera Speed 12	GT	THR; 1 Ret	CRO; 1 Ret	OUL; 1; 7†	DON; 1 Ret	SIL; 1; 1	BRH; 1; 3	DON; 1 Ret	CRO; 1; 4	SIL; 1; 9	SNE; 1 Ret	SPA; 1; 4	SIL; 1; 3		6th	60
2001	TVR Motorsport	(United Kingdom) Bobby Verdon-Roe (United Kingdom) Michael Caine	TVR Cerbera Speed 12	GT	SIL; 1; 5	SNE; 1; 15	DON; 1; 3	OUL; 1; 3	CRO; 1; 2	**ROC**; **1**; 1	**CAS**; **1**; 2	BRH; 1; 1	DON; 1; 2	KNO; 1; 8	THR; 1 Ret	BRH; 1; 13	SIL; 1	3rd	

=== FIA Historic Formula One ===
(key) (Races in bold indicate pole position) (Races in italics indicate fastest lap)

Year	Team	Car	Class	1	2	3	4	5	6	7	8	9	10	11	12	13	Pos	Points
2009	Scuderia BVR	McLaren M26 -5	F1 Historic														1st	
2010	Scuderia BVR	McLaren MP4/1B	F1 Historic														1st	
2011	Scuderia BVR	McLaren MP4/1B	F1 Historic														1st	

=== Goodwood Revival RAC TT ===
Year	Team	Co-Drivers	Car	Class	Laps	Pos.	Class Pos.
2007	Tim Samways Sporting & Historic Cars	Peter Hardman	Ferrari 330 LMB			3rd	
2008	Tim Samways Sporting & Historic Cars	Peter Hardman	Ferrari 330 LMB			1st	
2009	Tim Samways Sporting & Historic Cars	Emanuelle Pirro	Ferrari 330 LMB			2nd	
2010	Tim Samways Sporting & Historic Cars	Tom Kristensen	Ferrari 330 LMB			DNF	
2011	JD Classics	John Young	Jaguar E-Type			2nd	
2014	Mark Lewis Motorsport	Jamie McIntyre	Iso A3/C			6th	
2021	Historic Automobiles	Martin Brundle	AC Cobra			5th	
2022	Historic Automobiles	Alex Brundle	AC Cobra			7th	
2023	Historic Automobiles	Alex Brundle	AC Cobra			9th	
2024	Historic Automobiles	Andre Lotterer	AC Cobra			4th	

† – Drivers did not finish the race, but were classified as they completed a sufficient number of laps.

=== Goodwood - Other Notable Results ===
Year	Team	Co-Drivers	Car	Class	Laps	Pos.	Class Pos.
2009	Tim Samways Sporting & Historic Cars	Nick Leventis	Ferrari 246S Dino			1st	
2015	Tim Samways Sporting & Historic Cars		Ferrari 246S Dino			1st	

== Other sources ==
Sporting positions
Preceded by Thomas Erdos	British Formula Renault; UK series champion 1991	Succeeded by Pedro de la Rosa
