= TVR Speed Eight engine =

TVR AJP8 Engine

Overview
- Manufacturer: TVR
- Production: 1996 – 2003

Layout
- Configuration: 75° flat-plane V8
- Displacement: 4,185 cc (255 cu in); 4,475 cc (273 cu in)
- Cylinder bore: 88 mm (3.5 in); 91 mm (3.6 in)
- Piston stroke: 86 mm (3.4 in)
- Cylinder block material: Aluminium alloy
- Cylinder head material: Aluminium alloy
- Valvetrain: SOHC 2 valves x cyl.
- Compression ratio: 10:1,10.75:1

Combustion
- Fuel system: Port fuel injection
- Fuel type: Petrol
- Cooling system: Water-cooled

Chronology
- Successor: TVR Speed Six engine

The AJP V8 is a naturally-aspirated V8 car engine designed by Alwyn Melling of the design consultancy MCD, and manufactured for road legal cars production (TVR introduced the Cerbera at the 1993 London Motor Show), from 1996 to 2003. The engine was intended to power the TVR Griffith and the TVR Chimaera, but delays in its production meant that it powered only the TVR Cerbera and, from the 1990 year, as strong performance and reliability testing development up to production, the TVR Tuscan Challenge race car in 4.5 litres version. It was first engine offered by TVR that was both designed and built in-house. The reason behind the engine's development and production was that Rover, after previous announcements, was bought by BMW in 1994, and Peter Wheeler, the owner of TVR at the time, feared that BMW would drop the Rover V8 engine used in TVRs since the early 80's. Wheeler contracted Al Melling to design a brand-new V8 engine to power the TVR Cerbera that TVR could also sell to other car manufacturers. TVR ceased manufacturing the design when the Cerbera was discontinued in 2003.

The engine was developed by Melling, John Ravenscroft and Peter Wheeler. Its production code-name was "AJP8" (A=Al, J=John, P=Peter); this naming convention was subsequently used for the Speed Six engine's "AJP6" code-name. The AJP V8 featured many aspects found in a racing engine, such as a flat plane crankshaft, a 75-degree angle between the cylinder banks, a SOHC arrangement operating two valves per cylinder, and sequential fuel injection.

Two versions of the AJP V8 engine were offered by TVR on the Cerbera Road car: one, displacing 4.2L and producing 360 bhp (270 kW; 360 PS), and the other displacing 4.5L and producing 420 bhp (310 kW; 430 PS). A Red Rose conversion was made available that increased output to 440 bhp (330 kW; 450 PS) when using fuel with a minimum octane rating of 97 RON. The Red Rose upgrade included reshaped intake and exhaust ports, higher compression, and an ECU that can be switched between two sets of fueling and ignition maps (for 95 RON and 97 RON fuel, respectively).

The AJP V8 engine had a high specific output for a normally aspirated engine at the time, with 83.3 bhp/L for the 4.2L, 93.3 bhp/L for the 4.5L, and 97.7 bhp/L for the Red Rose-specification 4.5L engine. Another notable aspect is the weight of the engine, which is 121 kg (267 lb) dry.
