= TVR Cerbera =

Sports car produced by TVR

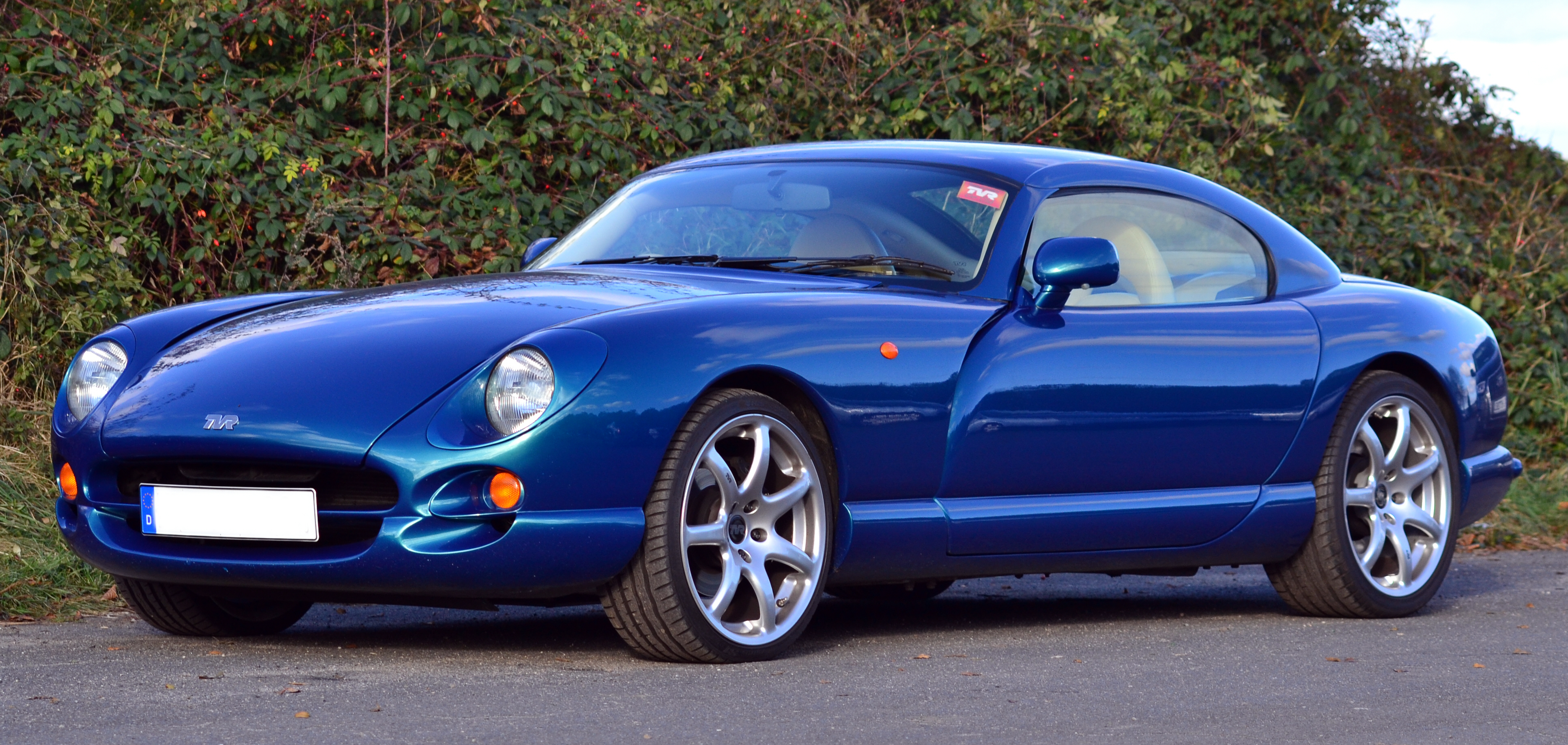
- TVR Cerbera Speed Six

Overview
- Manufacturer: TVR
- Production: 1996–2006; 1,490 produced
- Assembly: United Kingdom: Blackpool, England
- Designer: Damian McTaggart

Body and chassis
- Class: Sports car (S)
- Body style: 2-door 2+2 coupé
- Layout: Front mid-engine, rear-wheel-drive
- Related: TVR Chimaera

Powertrain
- Engine: 4.0 L Speed Six I6; 4.2 L Speed Eight (AJP8) V8; 4.5 L Speed Eight (AJP8) V8; 4.7 L Speed Eight (AJP8) V8
- Transmission: 5-speed manual

Dimensions
- Wheelbase: 2,566 mm (101.0 in)
- Length: 4,280 mm (168.5 in)
- Width: 1,865 mm (73.4 in)
- Height: 1,220 mm (48.0 in)
- Kerb weight: 1,100 kg (2,425 lb) (Speed Eight); 1,060 kg (2,337 lb) (4.5 Lightweight); 1,130 kg (2,491 lb) (Speed Six)

The TVR Cerbera is a car manufactured by the British company TVR between 1996 and 2006. Its name is derived from Cerberus, the three-headed beast of Greek legend that guarded the entrance of Hades. It is a coupé with a hardtop roof and a 2+2 seating layout that has been described as a sports car and a grand touring car.

Introduced at the 1993 London Motor Show, the Cerbera was the third car manufactured by TVR under the leadership of Peter Wheeler (the first was the Griffith and the second was the Chimaera). The car marked three milestones for the Wheeler-led company:

- The first hard-top—the Griffith and the Chimaera were both convertibles
- The first 2+2—TVRs were traditionally two-seaters
- The first to be powered by TVR's own engines—historically, TVR had purchased engines from mainstream manufacturers like Rover, Ford and Triumph

== Engines ==
Prior to the Cerbera, TVR had purchased V8 engines from Rover and then tuned them for their own use. When Rover was purchased by BMW, Peter Wheeler did not want to risk supply chain problems should the Germans decide to stop manufacturing the engine. In response, he engaged the services of race engineer Al Melling to design a V8 engine that TVR could manufacture in-house and even potentially offer for sale to other car-makers. In an interview for the television programme Top Gear, Wheeler explained "Basically, we designed the engine as a race engine. It was my idea at the time that if we wanted to expand, we ought to make something that we could sell to other people. We've ended up with a 75-degree V8 with a flat-plane crank. The bottom-half of the engine to the heads is exactly as you would see in current Formula One engines."

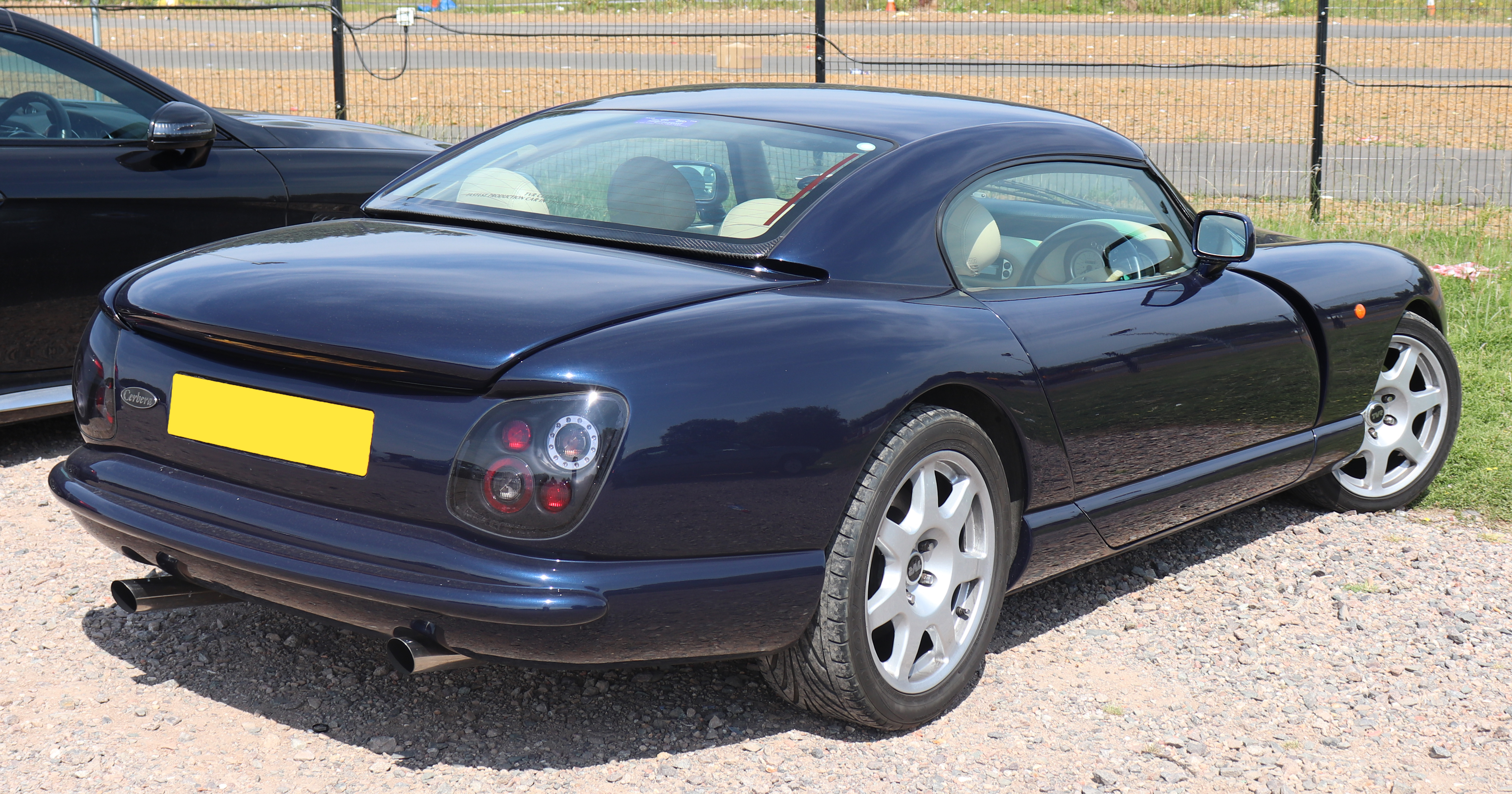
Rear view

The result was called the "Speed Eight" (official designation 'AJP8') after Al Melling, John Ravenscroft and Peter Wheeler, a 4.2 litre V8 rated at 360 hp (268 kW) and gave the Cerbera a top speed of 297 km/h (185 mph). A 4.5-litre version of the engine was later offered with 420 hp (313 kW).

The AJP8 has one of the highest specific outputs of any naturally aspirated V8 in the automotive world at 83.3 hp/litre for the 4.2 and 93.3 hp/litre for the 4.5. Later models of the 4.5 litre engine had the 'Red Rose' option, which increased output to 440 hp (328 kW) 97.7 hp/litre when run with super-unleaded (high octane) petrol. An unmarked button on the dashboard altered the engine mapping.

The engine is also unusually compact for a V8. According to TVR, the total weight of the finished engine is 121 kg (267 lb).

Following the success of the Speed Eight engine program, Peter Wheeler also undertook the design of a "Speed Six" engine. This engine also made its debut in the Cerbera but was a 4.0 litre inline slant six design with four valves per cylinder to the Speed Eight's two. The early engines proved unreliable, with many requiring rebuilding.

== Specifications ==
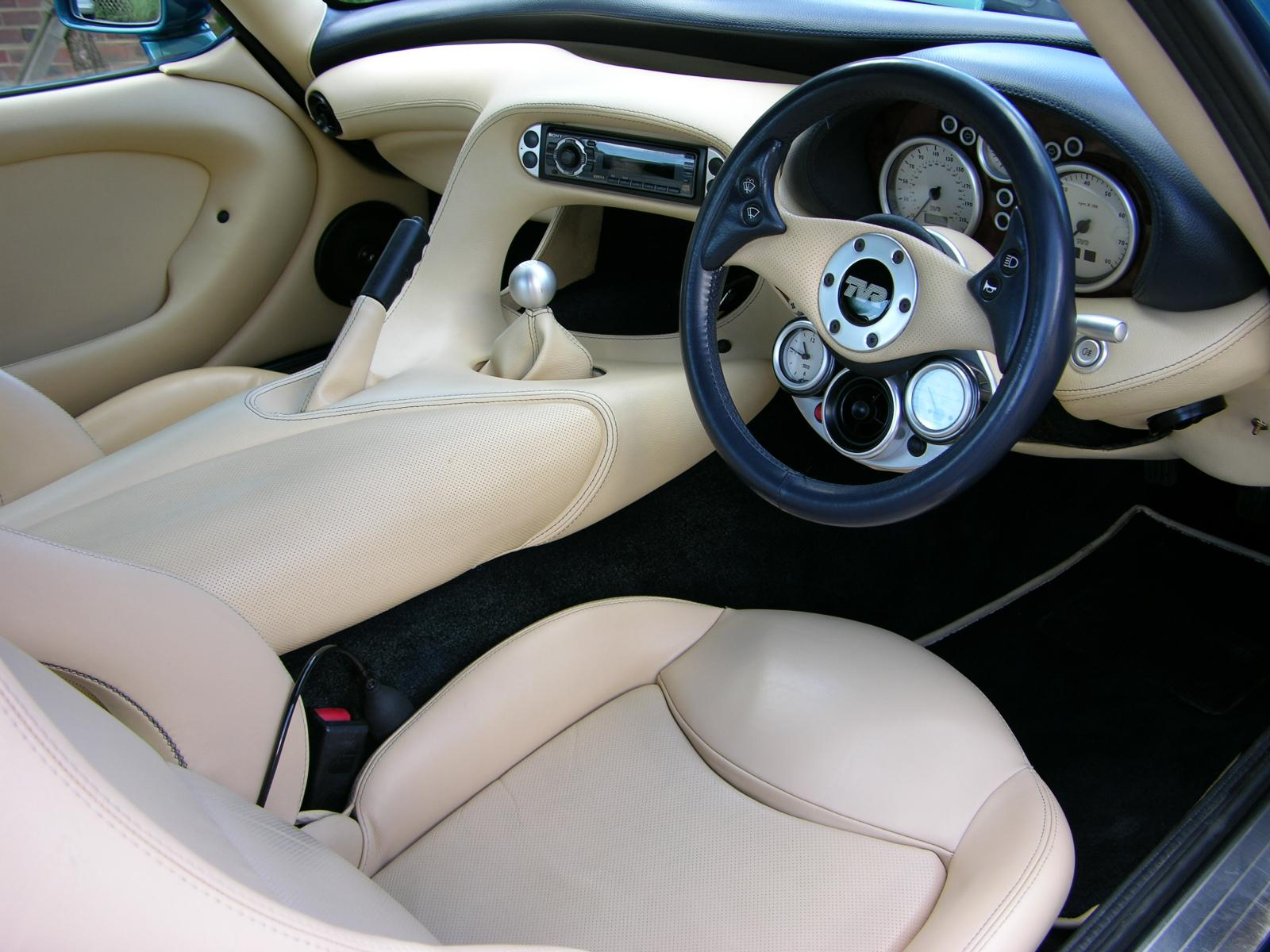
Interior

The Cerbera was designed from the start as a four-seater. The rear seats are smaller than the front, a design commonly referred to as a "2+2". However, the interior is designed so that the passenger seat can slide farther forward than the driver's seat. This allows more room for the person sitting behind the front passenger. TVR have referred to the layout as a "3+1" design.

The Cerbera's weight was quoted by TVR at 1,100 kg (2,425 lb), although customers claimed the weight varied between 1,060 kg (2,337 lb) and 1,200 kg (2,646 lb).

The dashboard was designed especially for the Cerbera and uses a two-spar steering wheel as opposed to the typical three-spar previously found in most TVRs. The reason for this is that minor instruments are located on a small panel below the steering wheel and a third spar in the wheel would have made them difficult to read.

Like all TVRs of the Peter Wheeler era, the Cerbera had a long-travel throttle to compensate for the lack of electronic traction-control and very sharp steering. The V8 powered cars were two turns from lock to lock and the Speed Six car was 2.4 turns. This made it easier for experienced drivers to maintain or regain control of the car in the event of a loss of traction but some less experienced drivers complained that it made the cars feel "twitchy" and more responsive than they would otherwise have preferred.

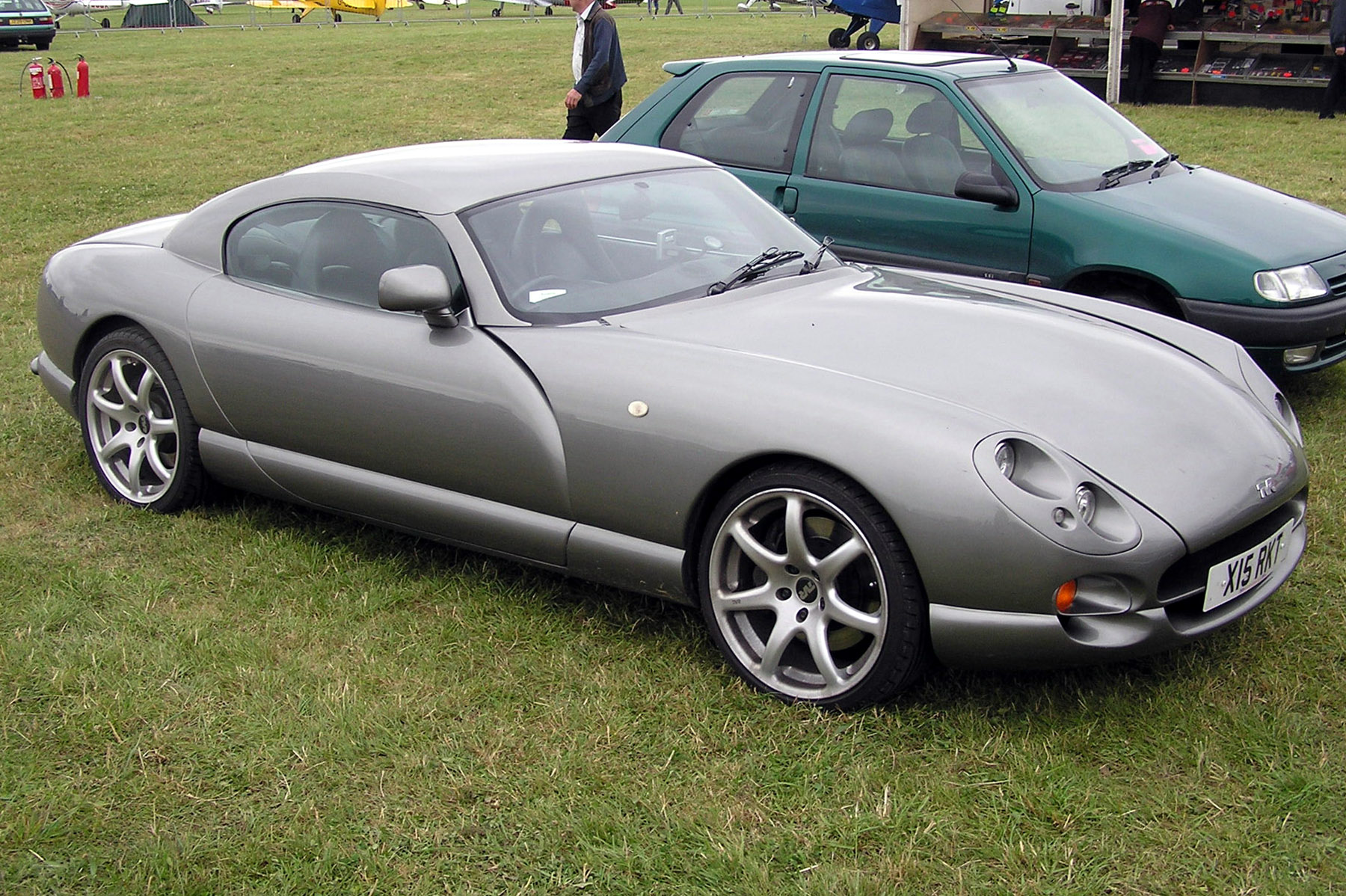
TVR Cerbera (post-facelift)

In 2000, TVR changed the styling of the car slightly by modifying the headlights to more closely resemble those seen on the Tuscan. The "facelift" features were available with all three engine configurations. In addition, the cars equipped with the 4.5 litre engine were offered with the "lightweight" option, reducing the overall weight through the use of lighter body panels and a slightly reworked interior.

== Performance ==
Model	Capacity (cc)	type	Power (hp)	Torque	Max speed	0–97 km/h (0-60 mph) (s)
4.0 L Speed Six	3,996	straight-6 DOHC 24v	350 hp (261 kW; 355 PS) at 6,800 rpm	330 lb⋅ft (447 N⋅m) at 5,000 rpm	170 mph (274 km/h)	4.4
4.2 L Speed Eight	4,185	75° V8 SOHC 16v	360 hp (268 kW; 365 PS) at 6,500 rpm	320 lb⋅ft (434 N⋅m) at 4,500 rpm	180 mph (290 km/h)	4.2
4.5 L Speed Eight	4,475	75° V8 SOHC 16v	420 hp (313 kW; 426 PS) at 6,750 rpm	380 lb⋅ft (515 N⋅m) at 5,500 rpm	185 mph (298 km/h)	4.1
4.5 L Speed Eight 'Red Rose'	4,475	75° V8 SOHC 16v	440 hp (328 kW; 446 PS) at 7,250 rpm	402 lb⋅ft (545 N⋅m) at 5,500 rpm	193 mph (311 km/h)	3.9

== The Last Cerbera ==
In August 2006, TVR held an online auction for what it billed as "The Last Cerbera". According to thelastcerbera.com, the website that TVR created especially for the auction, TVR's owner and chairman, Nikolay Smolensky brought the design out of retirement for one more unit as an homage to the "beautiful but brutish bygone British sports car." The "last Cerbera" was a 4.5 Lightweight right-hand drive car in Pepper white with Prussian blue leather interior trim. The auction failed to meet its reserve price but TVR still decided to sell the car to the high bidder. The final bid was under £45,000 to which 5% plus 17.5% VAT would be added.

== Cerbera Speed 12 ==
The TVR Cerbera Speed 12, originally known as the Project 7/12, is a high performance sports car designed by TVR in 1997. Based on the TVR Cerbera, the vehicle was intended to be both the world's highest performance road car and the basis for a GT1 class endurance racer. However, problems during its development, changing GT1 class regulations and the eventual decision that it was simply incapable of being used as a road car forced TVR executives to abandon its development.

The engine, displacing 7.7 L (469.9 cu in) and having twelve cylinders, was reportedly capable of producing nearly 1,000 hp (746 kW), although an exact measurement was never made. Nonetheless, it was claimed to have a top speed greater than that of the McLaren F1.
