= TVR Cerbera Speed 12 =

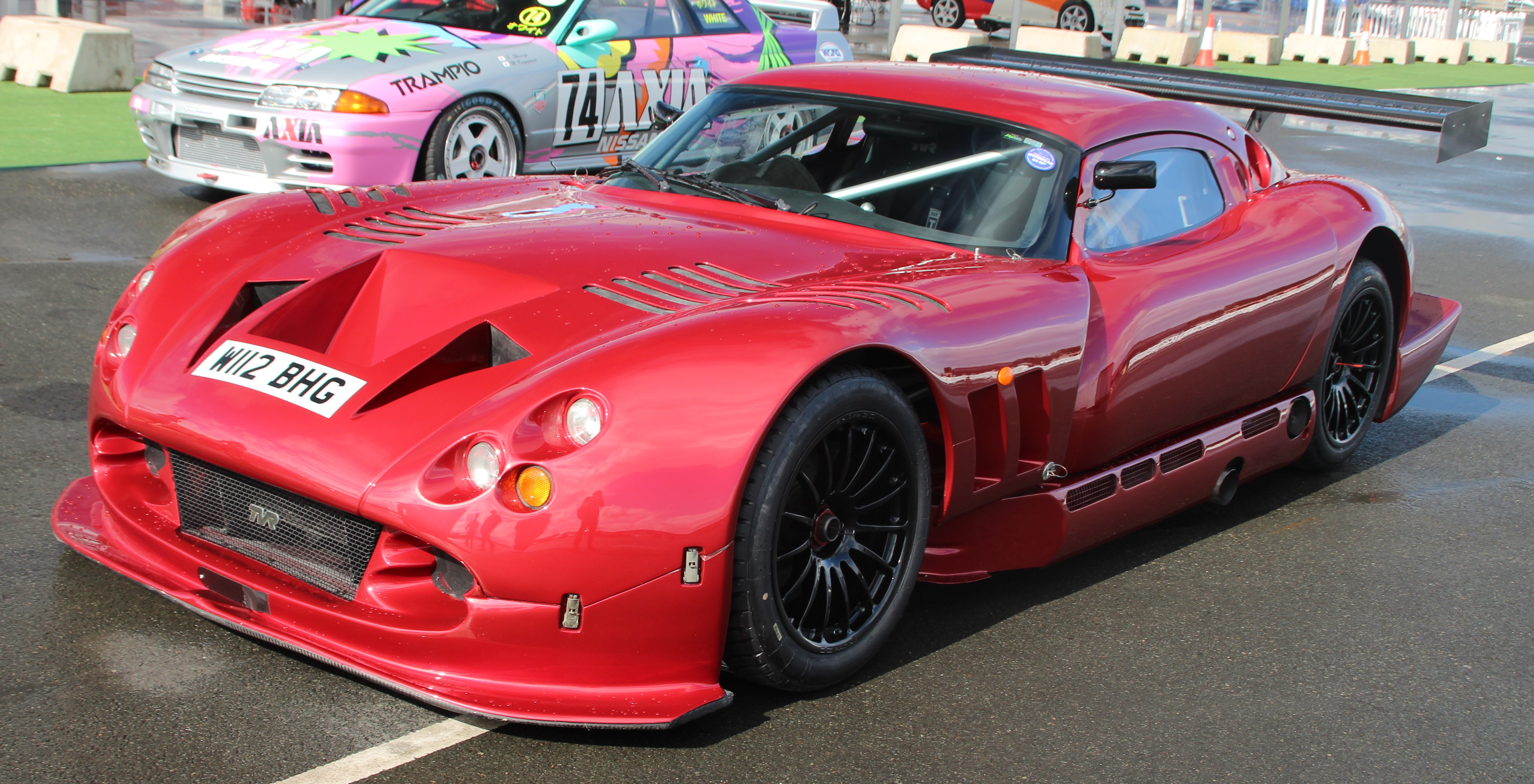

Overview
- Manufacturer: TVR
- Also called: TVR Project 7/12
- Production: 1996–1998; 3 produced
- Assembly: United Kingdom: Blackpool, England
- Designer: Chris Stallard, Darren Hobbs

Body and chassis
- Class: Sports car (S)
- Body style: 2-door coupe
- Layout: Front mid-engine, rear-wheel-drive
- Related: TVR Cerbera

Powertrain
- Engine: 7,730 cc (7.73 L) Speed 12 V12
- Transmission: 6-speed manual

Dimensions
- Wheelbase: 2,640 mm (103.9 in)
- Length: 4,360 mm (171.7 in)
- Width: 1,960 mm (77.2 in)
- Height: 1,130 mm (44.5 in)
- Kerb weight: 1,100 kg (2,425 lb)

The TVR Cerbera Speed 12, originally known as the Project 7/12, is a sports car designed by TVR in 1997. Based on the TVR Cerbera, the vehicle was intended to be both the world's fastest road car and the basis for a GT1 class endurance racer. However, problems during its development, changing GT1 class regulations and the eventual decision that it was simply incapable of being used as a road car forced TVR executives to abandon its development.

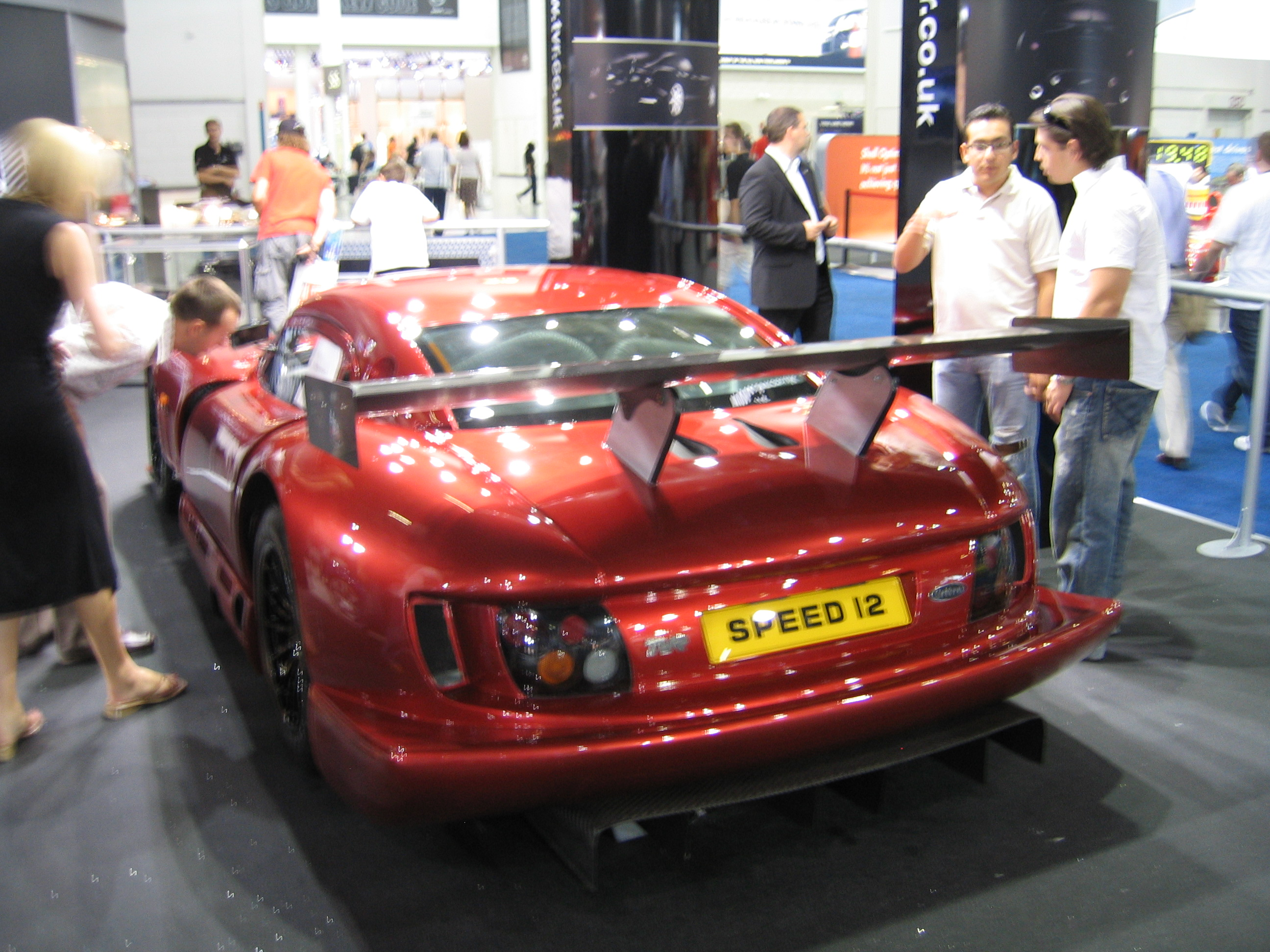
Rear view

The engine, displacing 7.7 L (469.9 cu in) and having twelve cylinders, was reportedly capable of producing nearly 1,000 hp (746 kW), although an exact measurement was never made. Nonetheless, it was claimed to have a top speed greater than that of the McLaren F1.

== History ==
=== Project 7/12 concept ===
The vehicle, known as the TVR Project 7/12, first appeared at the 1996 Birmingham Motor Show and dominated the show once it was unveiled, attracting more crowds than any other cars in the show. The number "7" referred to the 7.7 litre (actually 7.73 L) engine, and "12" for the number of cylinders in the engine. TVR claimed that the engine would have a power output of more than 800 hp (597 kW) and be faster than the McLaren F1. The first concepts shown were based on FIA GT1 class race rules which meant that they would be restricted to 660 hp (492 kW) but the weight would be kept at roughly 1,000 kg (2,205 lb). The road car would weigh the same but without the restrictors, the power was greatly increased. Despite the claims, the actual output figure was not recorded. It had a specially built 6-speed manual transmission and clutch. The engine was essentially made from two TVR AJP6 straight-6 engines mated on a single crankshaft. Unusually for an automobile of its type, the Speed Twelve's engine block was not constructed of cast iron or aluminium alloy, but rather of steel and was designed by John Ravenscroft.

=== Speed 12 ===
==== GT1 ====
By 1998, the car had been renamed the TVR Speed 12 and the racing version called the Speed 12 GTS was finalising development to compete in the GT1 class races. TVR wanted to race at the 24 Hours of Le Mans, but that never happened. However, the Speed 12 GTS did manage to compete in a few races in the 1998 British GT Championship in the GT1 class, though sudden rule changes caused by advanced high-cost purpose built racers such as the Porsche 911 GT1, Nissan R390 and the Toyota GT-One and the subsequent demise of the class in other championships suddenly rendered the Speed 12 obsolete. In order that their work not go to waste, TVR immediately set about developing the road-going Speed 12, although the project would not be completed for another year.

==== GT2 ====
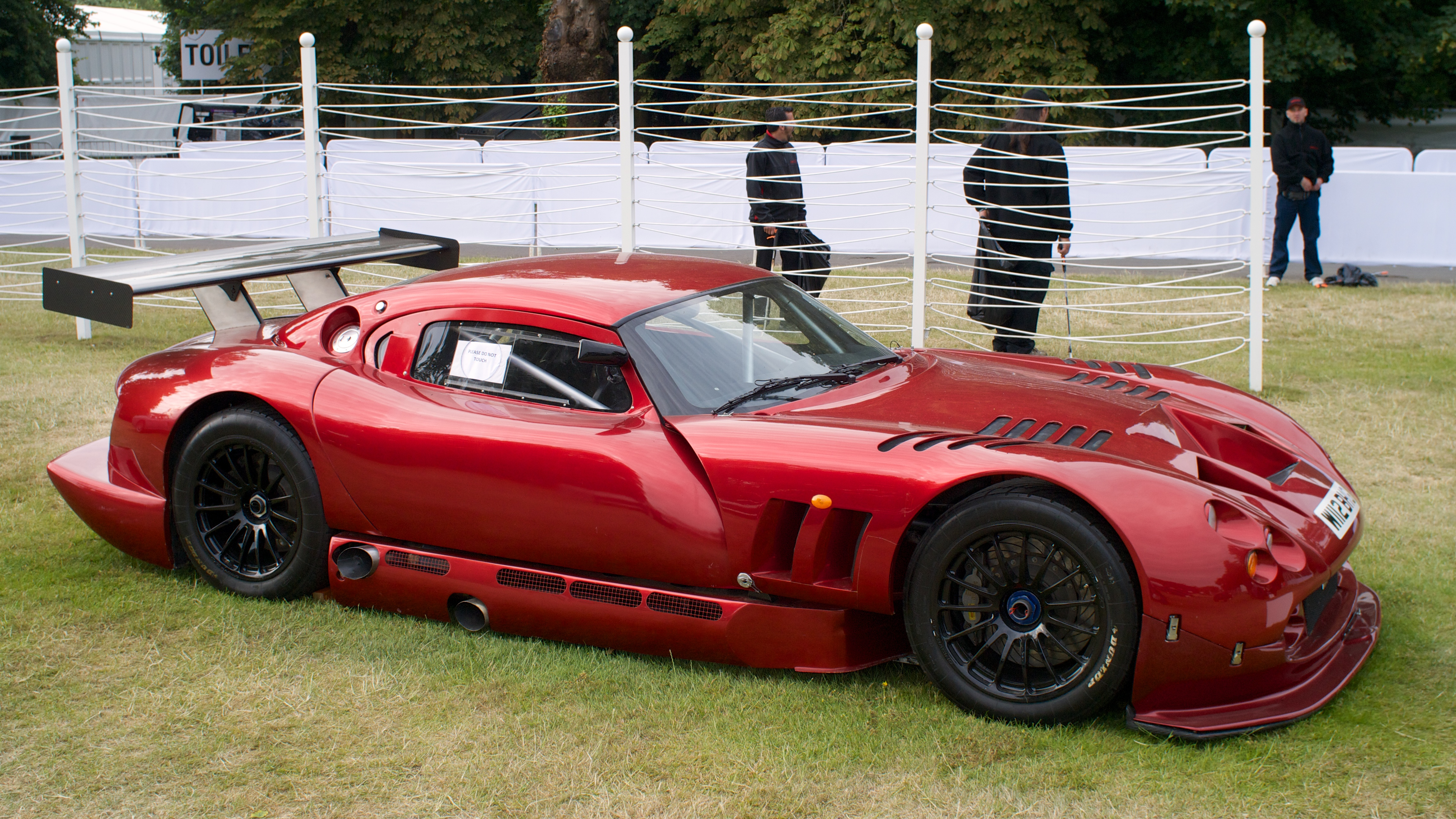
TVR Cerbera Speed 12 at the 2014 Goodwood Festival of Speed

Completed in 2000, the car was now rechristened TVR Cerbera Speed 12; it never had a true measurement of engine power output officially taken, although the original engine (which produced 800 hp according to TVR) later confirmed to be around 840 hp was employed yet again. The weight was kept down to 1,000 kilograms and TVR reminded people that they were making a car that they thought would beat the McLaren F1 with the words "over 240 miles per hour" mentioned on several occasions. The new car would also be built in parallel with a new race car, although TVR were forced to opt for GT2 class as the GT1 class had been dropped some years previous. The new race car managed to run for a few seasons in the British GT Championship and had some success, winning several races. It did however have problems with reliability, often leading to the car retiring from races. Meanwhile, the road car was almost ready and TVR had taken a good number of orders and deposits for it. With a price of £245,000 it would be the most expensive TVR in history.

The racing version of the engine produced approximately 675 hp (503 kW) with its power limited by the intake restrictors required by racing regulations. For the road-version of the engine, the restrictors were not needed so the engine was developed without them.

In an interview then-owner Peter Wheeler, said that TVR had tried to record the car's power on an engine dyno. The dyno was rated at 1,000 hp (746 kW) but the test resulted in its input shaft being broken. To get an approximate figure, TVR engineers tested each bank individually; the result was 480 hp (358 kW) per bank, suggesting a total rating of 960 hp (716 kW). Wheeler, no newcomer to high performance cars and an experienced racer in the TVR Tuscan Challenge, drove one of the finished prototypes home and concluded that the car was unusable on the road, in his opinion simply too powerful.

The deposits were returned when the production plans were cancelled. The remaining prototypes were carted around to various car shows. One by one they were dismantled and used as spares for the Speed 12 race cars still competing in the British GT championship. In August 2003 TVR placed an advert in Auto Trader for a TVR Cerbera Speed 12 registered W112 BHG. What TVR planned to do was to rebuild one of the prototypes and sell it on to an enthusiast. Buying the car was not a simple process however, and involved being personally met and vetted by Peter Wheeler himself to make sure the buyer was a suitable candidate for purchasing the car. Eventually, the deal was completed and the Speed 12 was rebuilt and handed over to its new owner. Since the original bodywork had been destroyed, TVR had to use a remaining shell from one of the GT racers. On top of that TVR did some more work on the engine and the ECU. The car featured in the May 2005 edition of the Evo magazine in which it was described as "awesome" and "terrifyingly quick".

W112 BHG was on display at the Lakeland Motor Museum, Backbarrow, Cumbria for some time.

On 20 May 2023 the originally produced Speed 12 was sold in an auction for £601,500.

== Specifications ==
- Brakes: Ventilated discs, 378 mm (14.9 in) diameter (front), 273 mm (10.7 in) (rear)
- Suspension: Double wishbones, coil springs over gas dampers.
- 0-97 km/h (60 mph): 2.9 seconds
- Weight: 1,000 kg (2,205 lb)
- Power output: 626 kW (840 hp)
- Top speed: 386 km/h (240 mph)

Note: Performance statistics are manufacturer estimates.
