= TVR Chimaera =

Grand Tourer produced by TVR

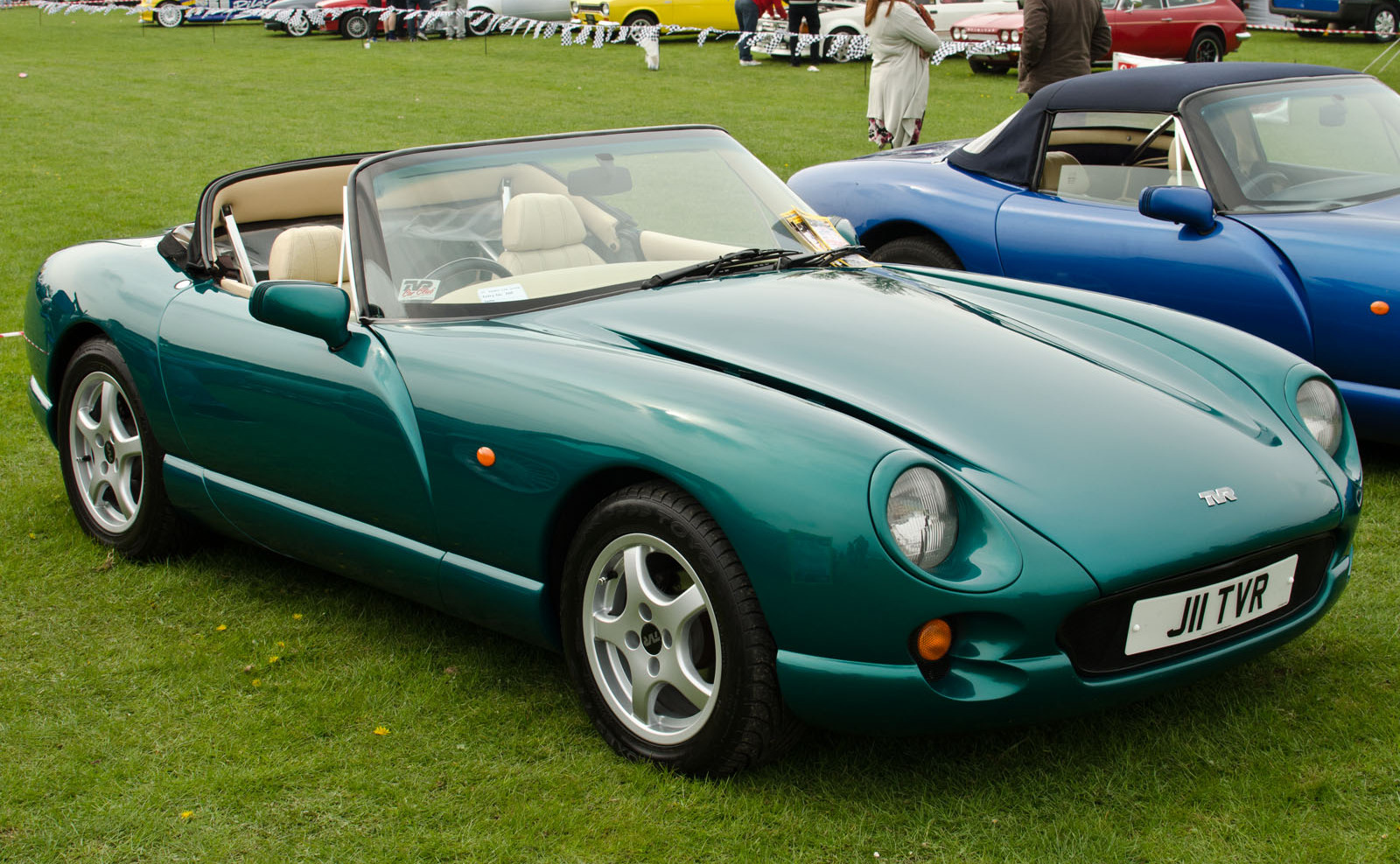
- 1995 TVR Chimaera

Overview
- Manufacturer: TVR
- Production: 1992–2003; 5,256 produced
- Assembly: United Kingdom: Blackpool, England; Malaysia: Port Klang (TVR Sports (Malaysia) Sdn. Bhd.: 1996–2003)
- Designer: John Ravenscroft

Body and chassis
- Class: Grand Tourer (S)
- Body style: 2-door roadster
- Related: TVR Griffith; TVR Cerbera

Powertrain
- Engine: 4.0 L Rover V8; 4.3 L Rover V8; 4.5 L Rover V8; 5.0 L Rover V8
- Transmission: 5-speed Rover LT77 manual; 5-speed BorgWarner T5 manual (500)

Dimensions
- Wheelbase: 2,286 mm (90.0 in)
- Length: 4,015 mm (158.1 in)
- Width: 1,865 mm (73.4 in)
- Height: 1,215 mm (47.8 in)
- Kerb weight: 1,060 kg (2,337 lb)

Chronology
- Successor: TVR Tamora

The TVR Chimaera is a two-seater sports car manufactured by TVR between 1992 and 2003. The name was derived from Chimera, the monstrous creature of Greek mythology, which was made of the parts of multiple animals.

First shown at the 1992 Earl's Court Motor Show, the Chimaera is an open-top roadster and uses the same backbone chassis and Rover V8 engine derivatives as the TVR Griffith. The car was intended to be the long distance tourer of the range and as such was longer, more spacious and had slightly softer suspension than its sister car.

== Specifications ==
=== Engine ===
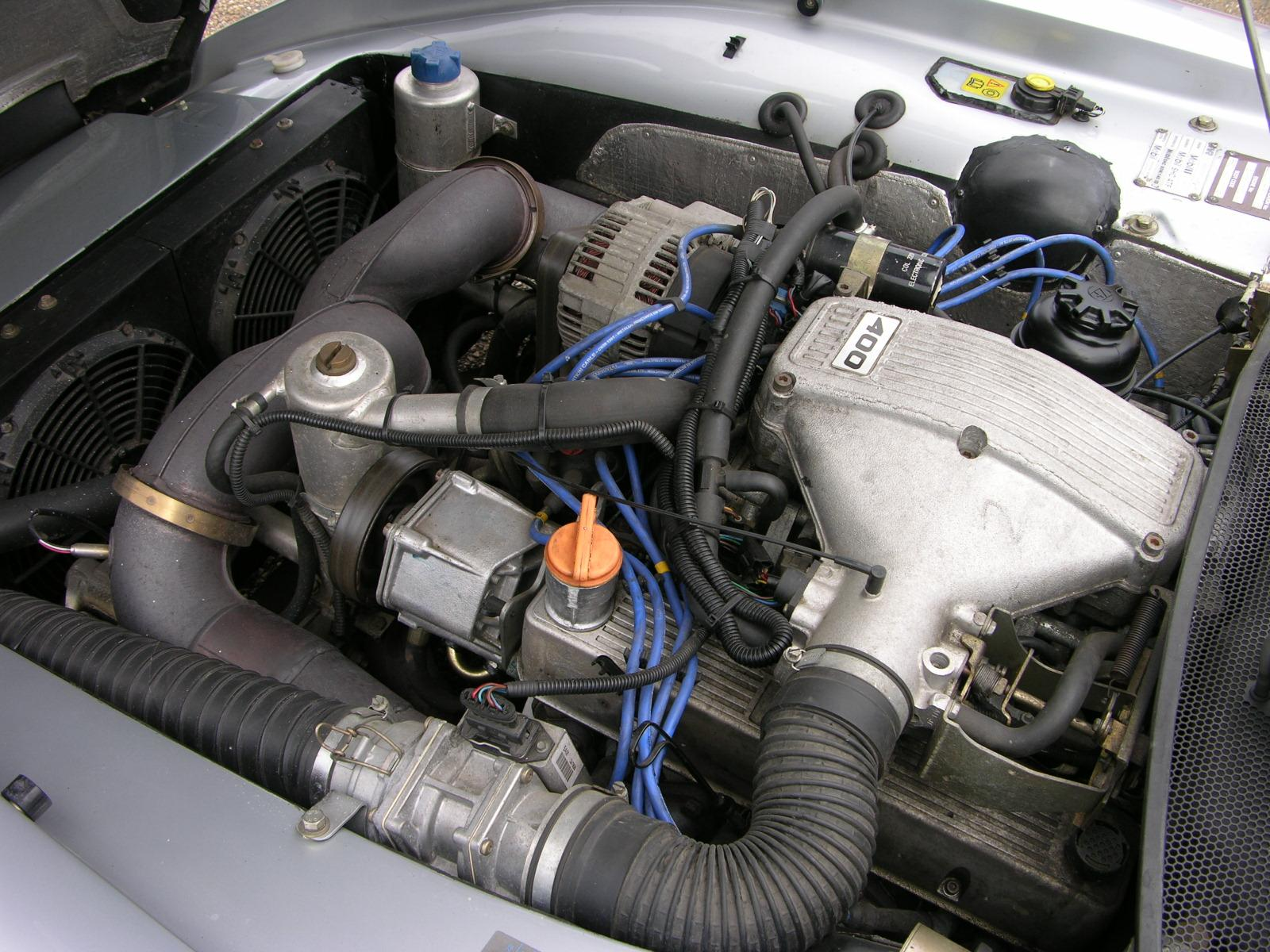
The 4.0 litre Rover V8 engine

- 90 degree aluminium V8

All engines are based on the 3.9 L Rover V8 unit, with increased displacement on the later models.

Model	Capacity (cc)	Power	Torque	Max speed	0-97 km/h (60 mph) (s)	0-161 km/h (100 mph) (s)
4.0	3,950	240 hp (179 kW; 243 PS)	270 lb⋅ft (366 N⋅m) at 4,000 rpm	245 km/h (152 mph)	5.1	12.5
4.0 HC	3,950 Hi Compression	275 hp (205 kW; 279 PS)	305 lb⋅ft (414 N⋅m)	254 km/h (158 mph)	4.7	12.1
4.3	4,280	280 hp (209 kW; 284 PS)	305 lb⋅ft (414 N⋅m) at 4,000 rpm	254 km/h (158 mph)	4.6	11.3
4.5	4,546	285 hp (213 kW; 289 PS)	310 lb⋅ft (420 N⋅m)	257 km/h (160 mph)	4.7	11.2
5.0	4,988	340 hp (254 kW; 345 PS)	320 lb⋅ft (434 N⋅m)	282 km/h (175 mph)	4.1	10.2

=== Suspension ===
The suspension consisted of all round independent, unequal-length double wishbones and coil over gas dampers assisted by anti-roll bars. Ground clearance was about 5 inches (130 mm).

=== Braking ===
The front disc brakes were 239 mm (9.4 in) on smaller displacement cars, and 260 mm (10 in) diameter and ventilated on five litre models. The rear disc brakes were 253 mm (10.0 in), or 273 mm (10.7 in) in diameter on the five litre model. Both sets were servo assisted with front/rear split dual circuits. There was a cable-operated hand brake for the rear wheels.

=== Steering ===
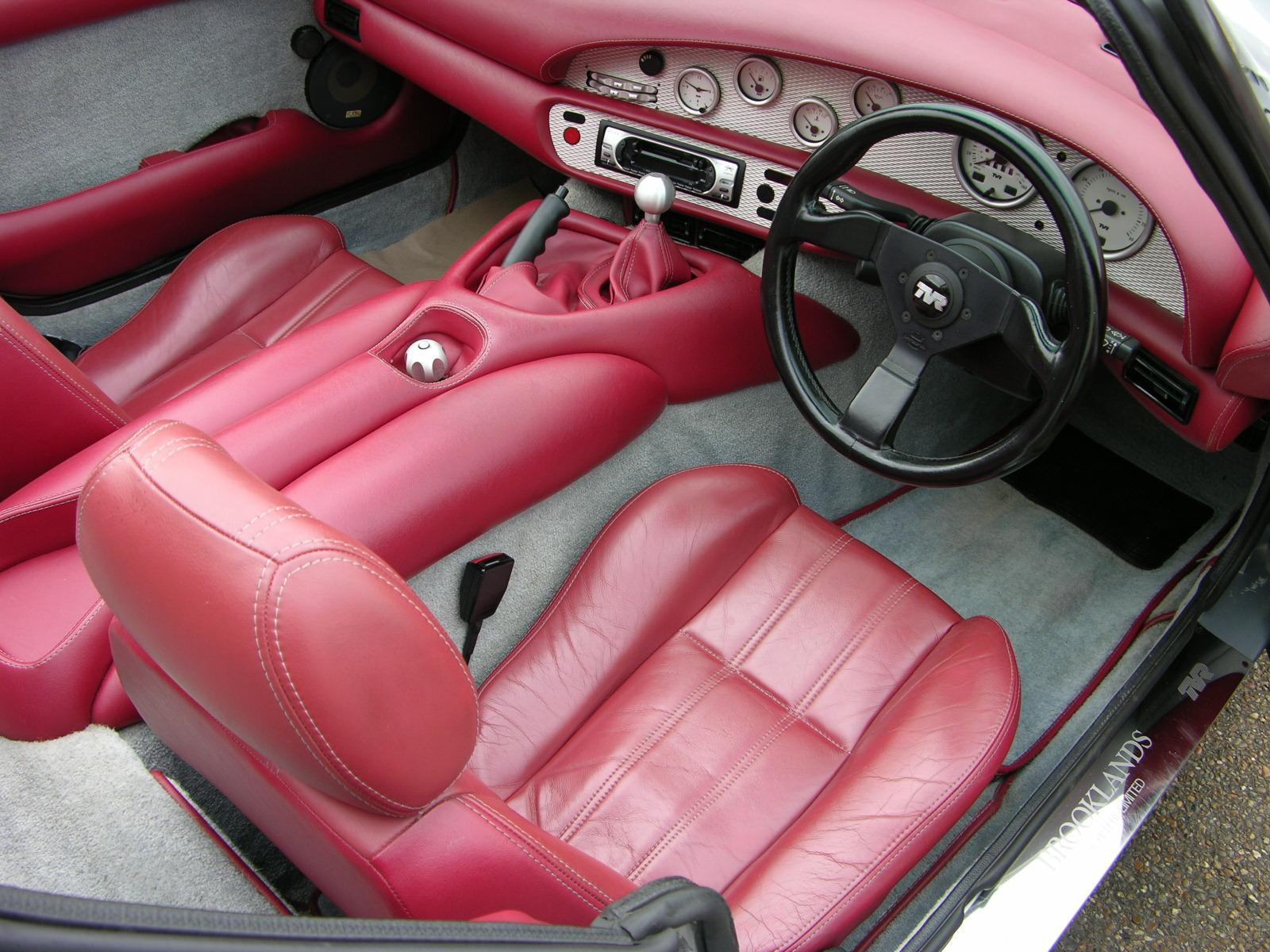
Interior

Steering was optionally power-assisted and worked via rack and pinion with adjustable steering column. There were 2.2 turns lock-to-lock for the power-assisted steering or 2.5 for unassisted. The steering wheel was 350 mm (14 in) in diameter and leather-covered, although other wheels could be specified by the customer. The standard fit was by Personal, in keeping with a majority of TVR models.

=== Manufacturer's options ===
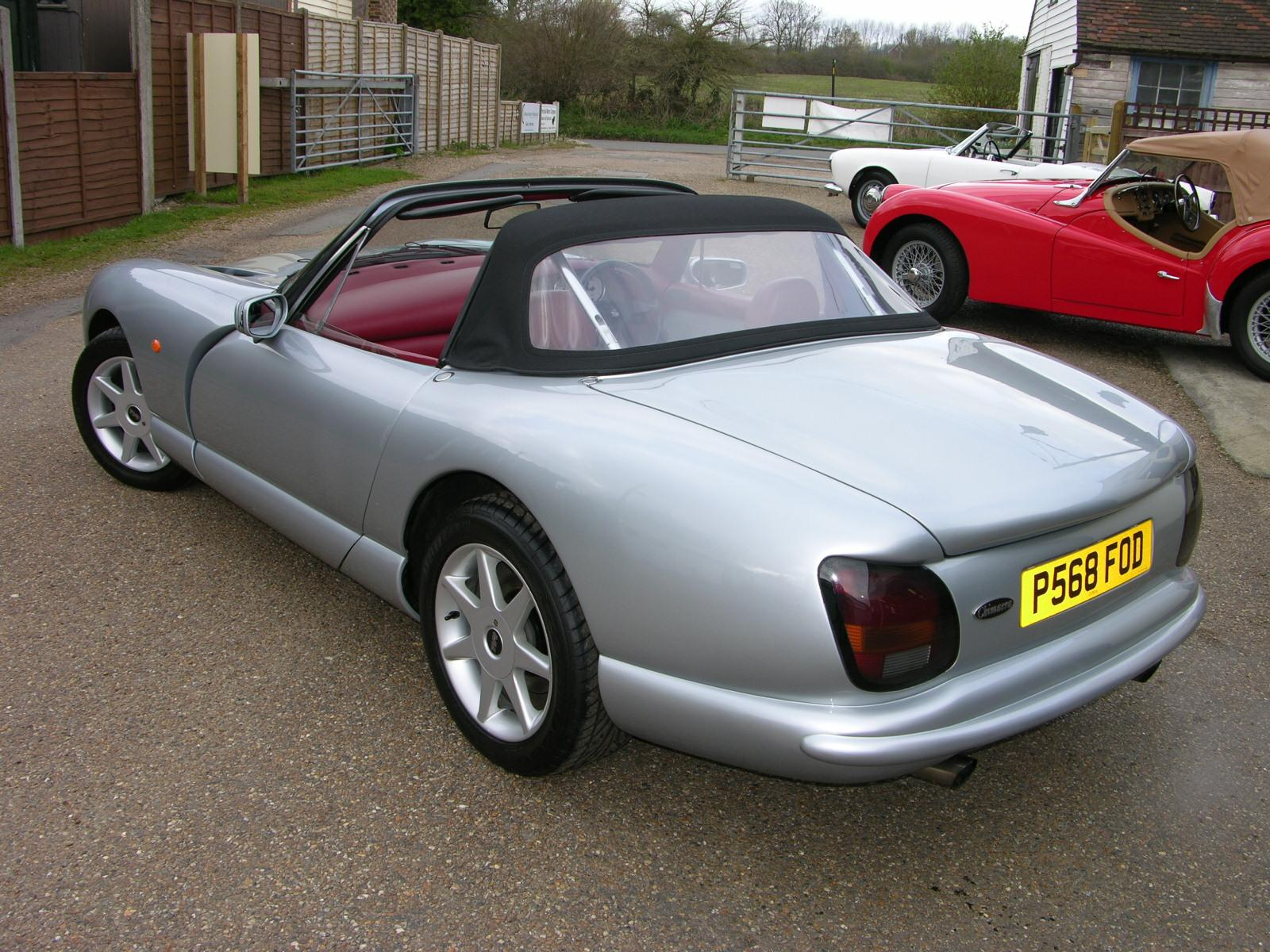
Rear view (1996-1997 interim model)

- Power assisted steering
- Air conditioning
- Rear speakers
- Six CD autochanger
- Full leather
- Heated Seats
- Wood and Chrome Steering Wheel
- Wool Carpets
- Gold coloured badges
- Seven spoke 'Griffith 500' wheels for smaller engine versions (standard on 5.0)
- 4,988 cc V8 (5.0) initially a factory option on the 4.3 and 4.5 litre models

== Model year changes ==
The Chimaera was originally intended to replace the Griffith but sufficient demand for both of the models led TVR continuing them. In 1994, TVR introduced the Chimaera 500, a high performance derivative of the Chimaera. The BorgWarner T5 manual transmission replaced the Rover LT77 unit on the rest of the range. A new alternator, power steering and a single Vee belt were fitted to improve reliability. The 4.3 litre engine option was replaced by the 4.0 litre High Compression option. The Chimaera was mildly updated in 1996. Updates included a rear bumper shared with the Cerbera, push button doors with the buttons located under the wing mirrors, a boot lid shared with the Cerbera and the replacement of the front mesh grille with a horizontal bar. The GKN differential was also replaced by a BTR unit.

A 4.5 litre model was added to the lineup in 1997. It was originally intended to be fitted with the AJP8 V8 engine but due to the engine not being ready on time, a stroked version of the Rover V8 was used instead. In 1998, the rear light styling and the number plate mounting angle was updated while the base 4.0 litre model was discontinued. In 2001, the Chimaera was again facelifted and now featured the Griffith's headlights as well as seats from the Cerbera. The Chimaera was succeeded by the Tamora in 2002.

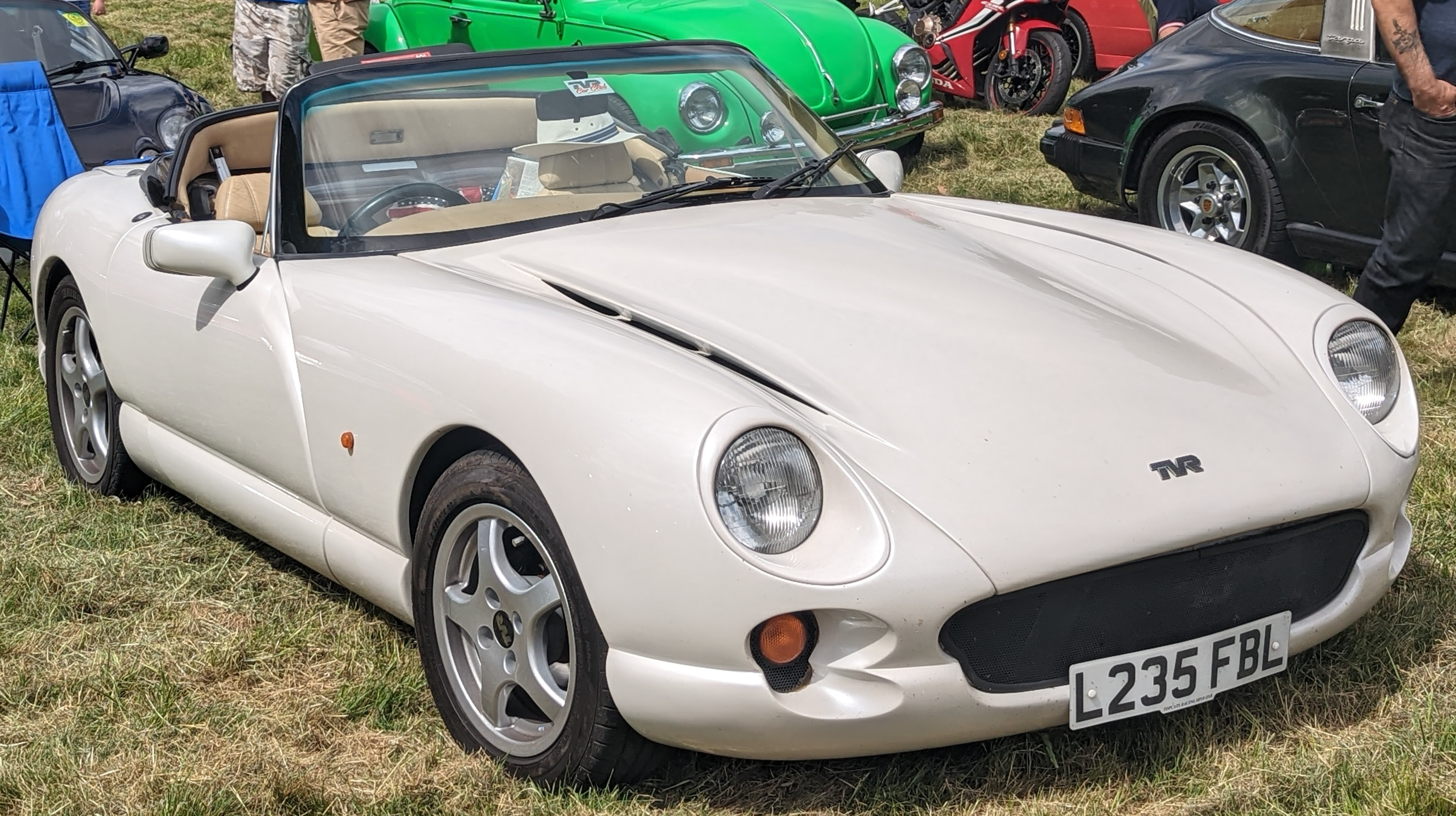
1993 TVR Chimaera, original version with mesh grille and external door buttons

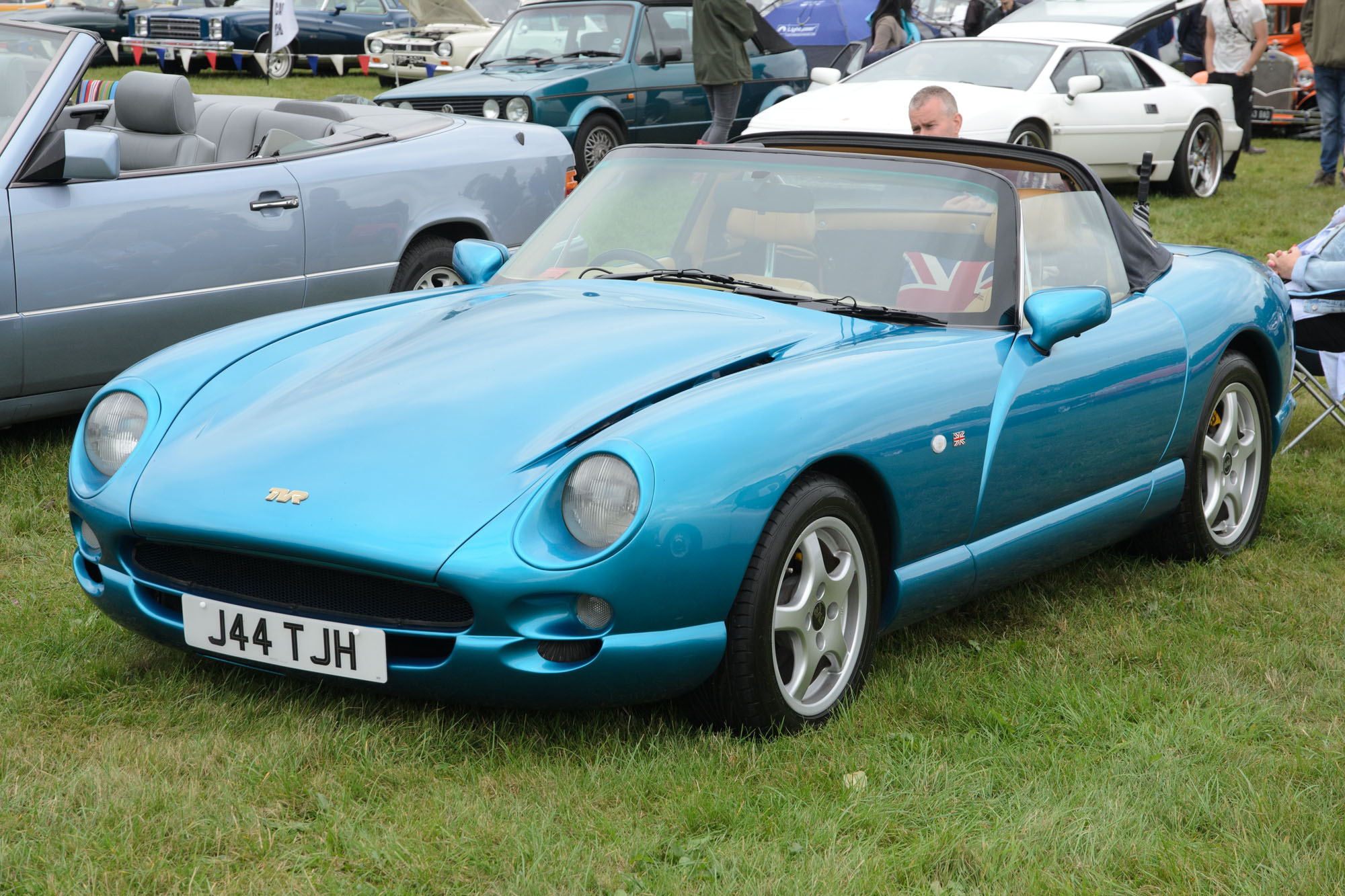
First facelift with a horizontal bar in place of the mesh grille

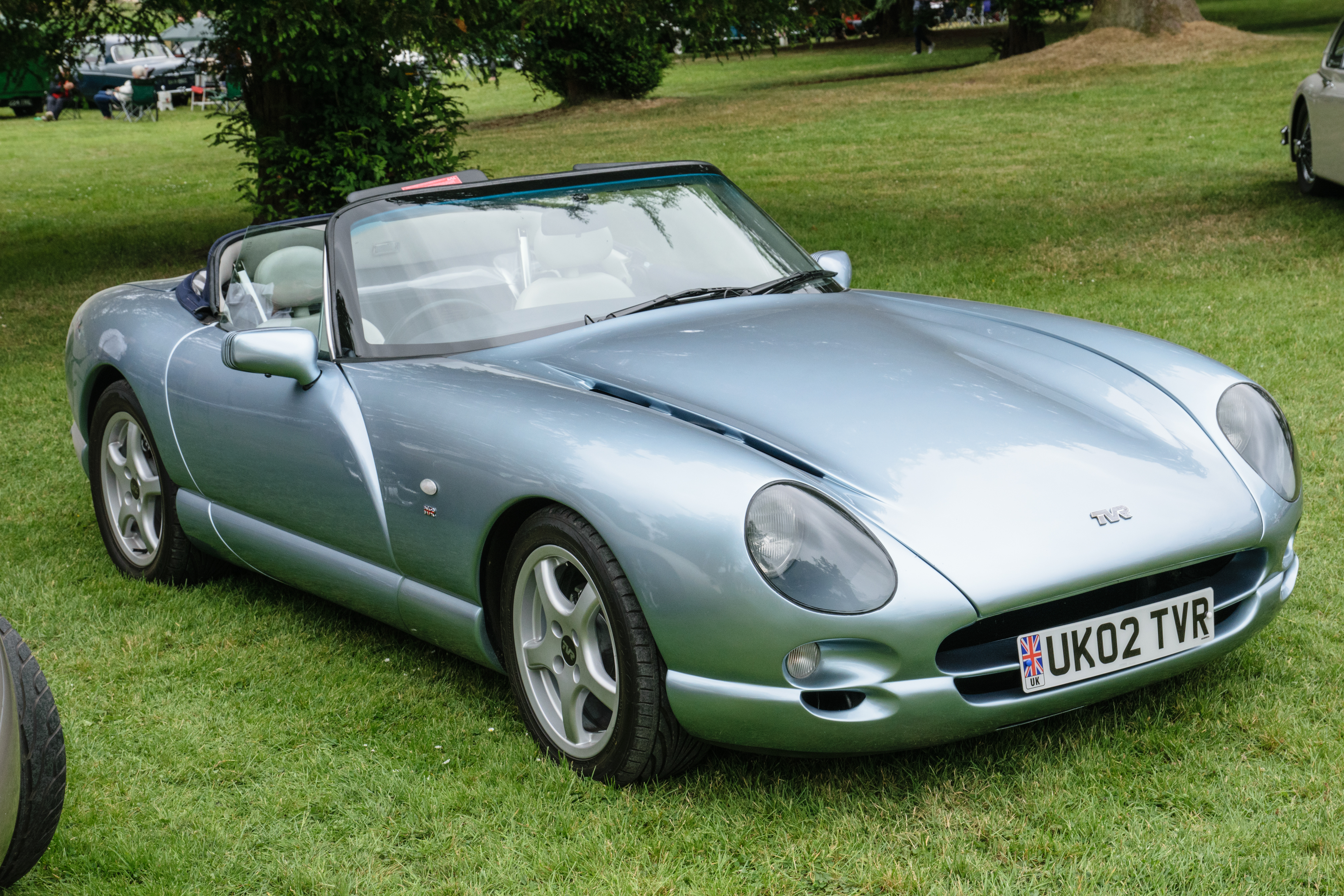
Second facelift with Griffith headlights
