= Peter Wheeler (TVR) =

British automobile designer (1944–2009)

Peter Robert Wheeler (29 February 1944 – 11 June 2009) was a chemical engineer from Sheffield, Yorkshire, UK, who owned the Blackpool-based TVR sports car company for 23 years.

Wheeler made his fortune supplying specialist equipment to the North Sea oil industry. After owning a TVR, he ended up buying the company in 1981. Wheeler sold TVR to Nikolai Smolenski in 2004 for around £15 million. Despite his background in chemistry, Peter Wheeler also contributed to the design of TVRs.

Under Wheeler's ownership, TVR moved from cars with Triumph and Ford engines to using the Rover V8, and later the Speed Eight and Speed Six designed for TVR by Al Melling. The cars produced under his control were typically stunning to look at, with incredible performance. The distinctive intakes below the headlamps on the Chimaera, were purely accidental and the result of his dog 'Ned' biting the prototype bodyshell.

Wheeler died on 11 June 2009 after a long illness.

Evo Magazine's former editor Harry Metcalfe said of Wheeler: "Peter Wheeler was one of those larger-than-life characters I thought only existed in novels. He always seemed to excel at anything he turned his hand to, despite not always doing things the easy way. He might have been quietly spoken but he possessed formidable drive and incredible presence (being 6ft 6in tall helped here), qualities that helped him build TVR into what it was in its heyday."

Speaking to CAR Magazine, Ben Samuelson, who worked with Wheeler for 12 years, said: "They were exciting, challenging and fantastic times. You never got bored – you didn’t know what was going to happen next! There were no committee meetings, he wasn’t a touchy-feely person, there were no group yoga sessions or anything; he was a proper boss."

Even after selling TVR Wheeler remained involved in the motoring industry, regularly racing an Aston Martin DB4, and also designing the Scamander amphibious car.
