= 2004 24 Hours of Le Mans =

72nd 24 Hours of Le Mans endurance race

Previous: 2003	Next: 2005
Index: Races | Winners

Circuit de la Sarthe track

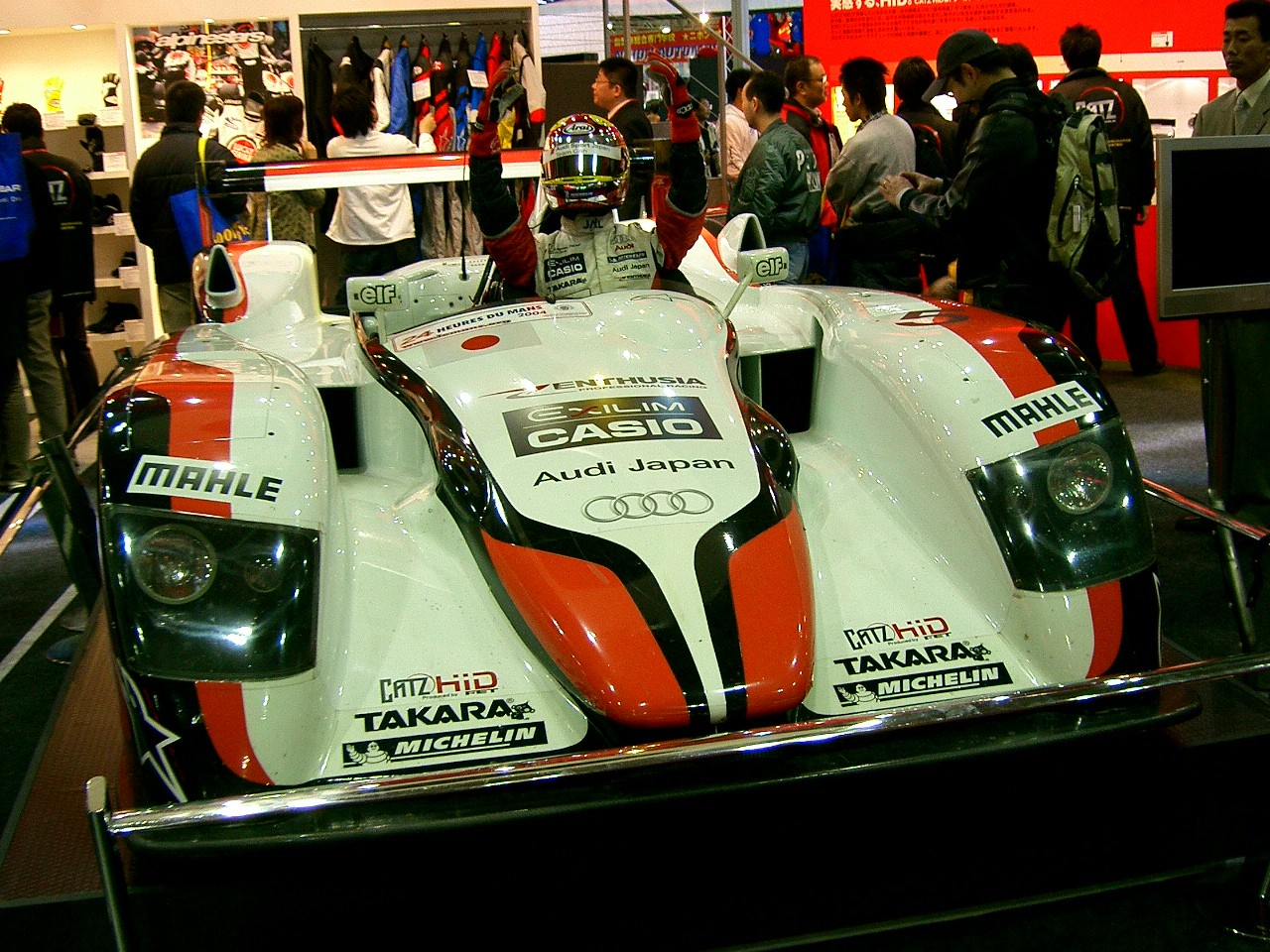
The race-winning No. 5 Audi Sport Japan Team Goh Audi R8 of Seiji Ara, Rinaldo Capello and Tom Kristensen.

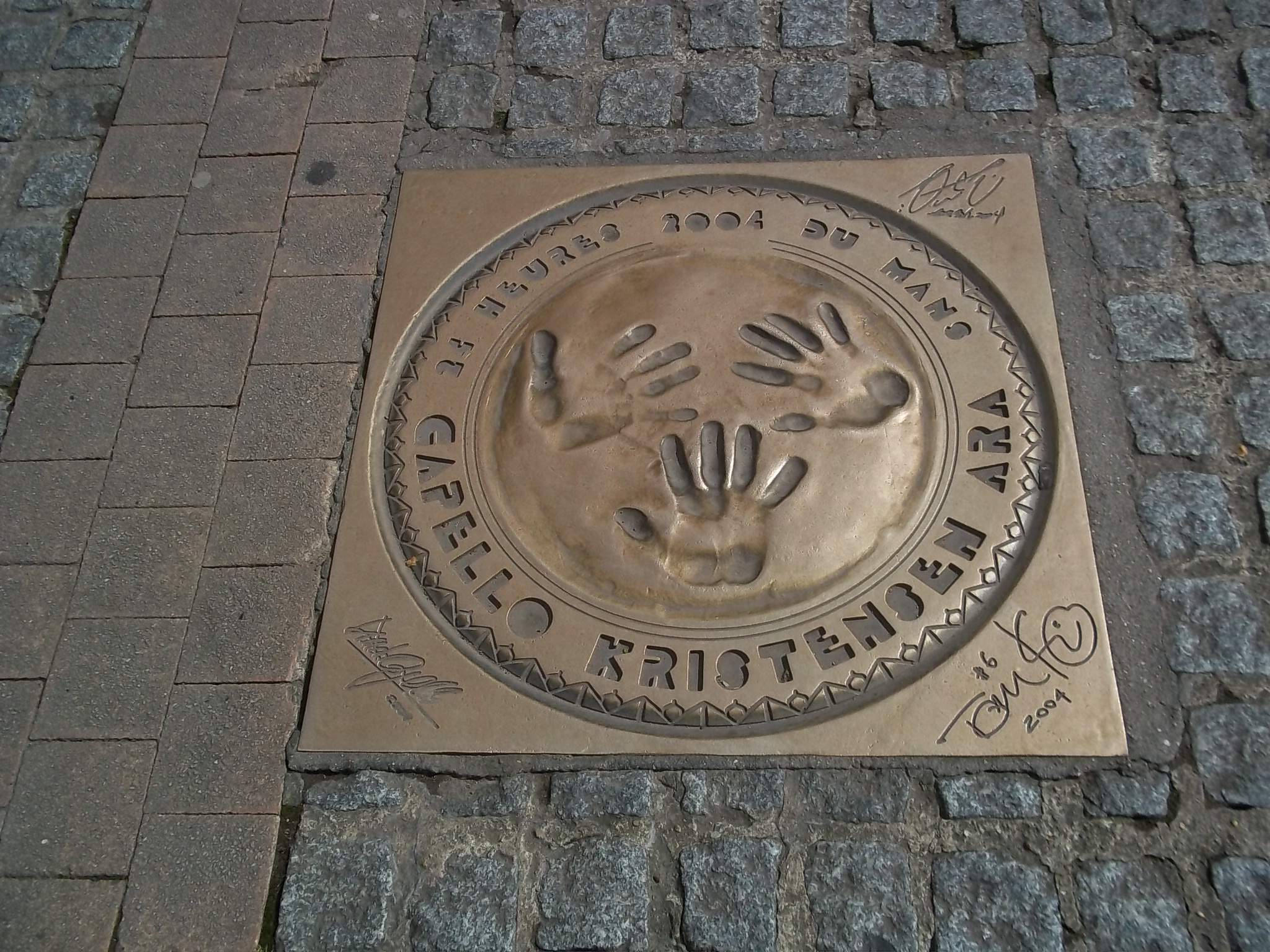
The engraved handprints of the race winners.

The 2004 24 Hours of Le Mans (French: 72^{e} 24 Heures du Mans) was a non-championship 24 hour automobile endurance race held from 12 to 13 June at the Circuit de la Sarthe near Le Mans, France, for teams of three drivers each fielding Le Mans Prototype and Grand Touring cars. It was the race's 72nd edition, as organised by the automotive group, the Automobile Club de l'Ouest (ACO) since 1923. A test day was held eight weeks before the race on 25 April. Approximately 200,000 people attended the race.

Jamie Davies, Johnny Herbert and Guy Smith of Audi Sport UK Team Veloqx R8 started from pole position after Herbert set the overall fastest lap time in the fourth qualifying session. The car led for the majority of the first 18 hours, until a rear suspension issue caused handling issues that were resolved in the garage. The Audi Sport Japan Team Goh car of Seiji Ara, Rinaldo Capello and Tom Kristensen took the lead, and despite catching fire during a pit stop, Ara held off the faster Herbert for the remainder of the race to win by 41.354 seconds. It was Ara's first Le Mans win, Capello's second and Kristensen's sixth. Kristensen tied Jacky Ickx's record of six overall victories and became the first driver to win the race five times in a row Audi's fourth overall victory since its first in the 2000 edition. The Audi Sport UK Team Veloqx car finished second, while Champion Racing's JJ Lehto, Emanuele Pirro and Marco Werner recovered from a crash in the second hour to finish third overall.

The Intersport Racing Lola B2K/40 car of William Binnie, Clint Field and Rick Sutherland won the Le Mans Prototype 2 (LMP2) category, finishing eight laps ahead of the Rachel Welter WR LM2001 car of Yojiro Terada, Patrice Roussel and Olivier Porta. The Le Mans Grand Touring Sport (LMGTS) class was won by a Chevrolet Corvette C5-R driven by Olivier Beretta, Oliver Gavin and Jan Magnussen, with the sister car of Ron Fellows, Max Papis and Johnny O'Connell finishing eleven laps behind in second place. Colin McRae, Rickard Rydell and Darren Turner finished third in their Prodrive Ferrari 550-GTS Maranello. Porsches took the first six places in the Le Mans Grand Touring (LMGT) class, with the White Lightning Racing Porsche 911 GT3-RSR of Jörg Bergmeister, Patrick Long and Sascha Maassen winning for the second consecutive year.

== Background and regulation changes ==
The 72nd 24 Hours of Le Mans took place from 12 to 13 June on the 8.482 mi (13.650 km) Circuit de la Sarthe road racing track near Le Mans, France. The race was first held in 1923 after the automotive journalist Charles Faroux, the Automobile Club de l'Ouest (ACO) general secretary Georges Durand and the industrialist Emile Coquile agreed to hold a test of vehicle reliability and durability. The 24 Hours of Le Mans is considered one of the world's most prestigious motor races and is part of the Triple Crown of Motorsport.

The ACO announced changes to the Le Mans Prototype (LMP) classes in March 2003, which went into effect for the 2004 race. The former Le Mans Grand Touring Prototype and Le Mans Prototype 900 (LMP900) categories were merged and renamed Le Mans Prototype 1 (LMP1), with only manufacturers competing. Because the Le Mans Prototype 675 (LMP675) category lacked a car capable of challenging for the overall victory, the ACO renamed it Le Mans Prototype 2. (LMP2). LMP900 and LMP675 cars built in accordance with the ACO technical regulations for the LMP and LMGTP categories could enter until 31 December 2005. Skid blocks were thickened by 10 mm (0.39 in) and the air restrictor size was reduced by five per cent. LMP1 and LMP2 teams could choose between an open or closed cockpit. The maximum weight of LMP2 vehicles was established at 750 kg (1,650 lb) and 900 kg (2,000 lb) for LMP1 cars. Engine displacement for normally aspirated engines set at 3,400 cc (210 cu in), turbocharged engines were limited to 2,000 cc (120 cu in) and engine displacement for diesel power units was restricted to 5,500 cc (340 cu in).

Following a series of airborne accidents in sports car racing, such as those involving a Porsche 911 GT1 at the 1998 Petit Le Mans and a Mercedes-Benz CLR at the 1999 Le Mans race, the ACO altered the bottom of the new LMP1 and LMP2 cars to reduce the amount of downforce produced outside of their wheelbase and a reduction in rear overhang coupled with an increase in front overhang for less pitch sensitivity to reduce the possibility of such a crash occurring. The rear wing was moved forward and shortened from 2,000 mm (200 cm) to 1,800 mm (180 cm). A 20 mm (2.0 cm) plank was added to the underside of all new LMP1 and converted "hybrid" cars to force a ride height increase and reduce the effectiveness of underfloor aerodynamics.

== Entries ==
By the deadline for entries on 11 February 2004, the ACO had received 77 applications (40 for the LMP classes and 37 for the Grand Touring (GT) categories). It issued 50 invitations to the 24 Hours of Le Mans, with entries split between LMP1, LMP2, Le Mans Grand Touring Sports (LMGTS), and Le Mans Grand Touring (LMGT).

=== Automatic entries ===
Teams that won their class in the 2003 24 Hours of Le Mans received automatic entries. Teams that won Le Mans-based series and events in 2003, such as the Petit Le Mans, the 1000 km of Le Mans and the American Le Mans Series (ALMS), were also invited. Some second-place finishers also received automatic entries into specific series and races. Entries were also granted to the 2003 FIA GT Championship winners and runners-up in the GT and N-GT categories. Had the entry of the 2003 Petit Le Mans category winner been the same as the 2003 American Le Mans Series class champion, the second automatic entry would have been awarded to another team in that category under an agreement with the ACO and the ALMS. Because entries were pre-selected to teams, teams were not permitted to switch cars from one year to the next. They were allowed to switch categories as long as they did not change the car make and the ACO gave official permission for the switch.

The ACO published its initial list of automatic invitations on 20 November 2003. Team Bentley, Infineon Team Joest, Pescarolo Sport (after switching engine suppliers from Peugeot to Judd), RN Motorsport, Dyson Racing and Alex Job Racing declined their automatic entries; their places were taken by Champion Racing, Audi Sport Japan Team Goh and Lister Racing due to their performance in the GT category during the 2003 FIA GT Championship.

Automatic entries for the 2004 24 Hours of Le Mans
Reason Entered	LMGTP/LMP900	LMP675	LMGTS/GT	LMGT/N-GT
1st in the 24 Hours of Le Mans	(United Kingdom) Team Bentley	(France) Noël del Bello Racing	(United Kingdom) Veloqx Prodrive Racing	(United States) Alex Job Racing
2nd in the 24 Hours of Le Mans	(United Kingdom) Team Bentley	(United Kingdom) RN Motorsports	(United States) Corvette Racing	(United States) Orbit Racing
1st in the Petit Le Mans	(United States) Champion Racing	(United States) Intersport Racing	(United Kingdom) Prodrive	(United States) Alex Job Racing
1st in the American Le Mans Series	(Germany) Infineon Team Joest	(United States) Dyson Racing	(United States) Corvette Racing	(United States) Risi Competizione
1st in the FIA GT Championship			(Italy) BMS Scuderia Italia	(Germany) Freisinger Motorsport
2nd in the FIA GT Championship			(Italy) BMS Scuderia Italia	(France) JMB Racing
1st in the 1000 km of Le Mans	Audi Sport Japan Team Goh	(France) Courage Compétition	(United Kingdom) Care Racing	(United Kingdom) Cirtek Motorsport
2nd in the 1000 km of Le Mans	(France) Pescarolo Sport	(United States) Intersport Racing	(United Kingdom) Care Racing	(Germany) Freisinger Motorsport

=== Entry list and reserves ===
On 25 March 2004, the ACO's seven-member selection committee announced the full 50-car entry list for Le Mans, plus six reserves. Following the publication of entries, several teams withdrew their entries. Arena Motorsport withdrew its Dome S101 car, promoting the No. 4 Taurus Sports Racing Lola B2K/10-Judd vehicle. Thierry Perrier's Porsche 911 GT3-RS was allowed to race after one of pre-selected BMS Scuderia Italia Ferrari 550-GTS Maranello's was withdrawn, because the team did not have enough time to make the car compliant with ACO regulations and it wanted to focus on the 2004 FIA GT Championship. Later, Risi Competizione's Ferrari 360 Modena GTC was replaced in the list of entries by XL Racing's Ferrari. Following that, Konrad Motorsport and Welter Racing were granted the fourth and fifth reserve entries, respectively, and XL Racing withdrew its Ferrari. A second Racing for Holland Dome car was promoted, giving the team two LMP1 entries.

On 21 April, the Car Racing team confirmed that its No. 67 Ferrari 550 was withdrawn due to financial problems from a lack of sponsorship and its place in the LMGT category was taken by a second Chamberlain-Synergy Motorsport-entered TVR Tuscan 400R. Force One Racing withdrew its Pagani Zonda from the race after a heavy crash at the Vallelunga Circuit in Italy halted development. This allowed Seikel Motorsport's No. 84 Porsche into the race. When the Spinnaker Clan Des Team withdrew on 1 June due to a lack of preparation and testing, the No. 36 Gerard Welter car took its place. Officials required Courage Compétition and its satellite operation Epsilon Sport to withdraw one C65 chassis per team after an engine supply agreement with Mecachrome was terminated, and both outfits sourced replacement engines from JPX.

== Testing ==
On April 25, the circuit hosted a mandatory pre-Le Mans test day split into two daytime sessions of four hours each, involving all 50 entries and two of the six reserve cars. With six minutes to go, Allan McNish's No. 8 Audi Sport UK Team Veloqx R8 set the pace with a 3:32.613 lap, followed by Johnny Herbert's No. 88 Audi. Marco Werner of Champion Racing was third with Team Goh's Tom Kristensen fourth. The two fastest non-Audis were fifth-placed David Brabham's No. 22 Zytek 04S car and sixth-placed Hiroki Katoh's No. 9 Kondo Racing Dome S101 vehicle. Max Papis led the LMGTS class in the No. 63 Corvette Racing C5-R in the final minutes of the second session with a lap of 3:49.982, ahead of Oliver Gavin's sister No. 63 Corvette and Christophe Bouchut's No. 69 Larbre Compétition Ferrari. Tomáš Enge and Rickard Rydell's Prodrive Ferrari cars were fourth and fifth, respectively. Jörg Bergmeister's No. 90 White Lightning Porsche 911 GT3-RSR led LMGT with a lap of 4:05.975, followed by Marc Lieb's No. 87 Orbit Racing car, which was sidelined for 2 1/2 hours with a broken steering rack after hitting the guardrail at Tertre Rouge corner. A seal failure in the Taurus Lola that mixed oil and diesel and leaked oil on the Mulsanne Straight, as well as a crash for Noël del Bello Racing's entry at Mulsanne Corner, caused further testing delays.

== Qualifying ==
On 9 and 10 June, all entrants had eight hours of qualifying, divided into four two-hour sessions. To qualify for the race, all entrants were required to set a time within 110 per cent of the fastest lap established by the fastest car in each of the four categories during the sessions. Audi led early on and Herbert's No. 88 car recorded a fastest lap of 3:34.907 on the session's final lap. Kristensen's Team Goh Audi was more than two seconds slower in second, and McNish in the No. 8 car was third. Jan Lammers' Racing for Holland Dome car was fourth, the fastest non-Audi. JJ Lehto's No. 2 Champion Audi was fifth with Soheil Ayari's No. 18 Pescarolo C60 finished sixth and Brabham's No. 22 Zytek 04S seventh. Pierre Kaffer damaged the No. 8 Audi Sport UK car when he went off the track at the first Mulsanne Chicane due to an error. With a lap of 3:46.020, Jean-Marc Gounon's No. 31 Courage C65 vehicle led in LMP2, more than eleven seconds ahead of its sister No. 35 Epsilon Sport car and the No. 24 Rachel Welter WR LM2001 entry. Olivier Beretta's No. 64 Corvette C5-R set the early pace in LMGTS, and his co-driver Gavin improved on his effort to set the class' best lap time of 3:54.359. Peter Kox's Prodrive Ferrari came second and Ron Fellows' No. 63 Corvette was third. The second Prodrive Ferrari finished fourth through rally driver Colin McRae's lap. Bergmeister's No. 90 White Lightning Porsche led LMGT with a lap of 4:09.679, followed by Stéphane Daoudi in the No. 70 JMB Racing Ferrari 360 Modena GTC.

Teams used the opening minutes of the second session to fine tune their cars and record their fastest laps in lower ambient and track temperatures. Due to a minor gear selection issue and slower traffic, Herbert failed to improve the best lap of the No. 88 Audi Sport UK R8. McNish's sister No. 8 car beat it by 3:34.683. No other driver improved their times over the rest of the session, enabling the No. 8 Audi to take provisional pole position from the No. 88 vehicle. After a collision with a Chevrolet Corvette C5-R at Arnage corner damaged Kristensen's Team Goh car's front splitter, Werner moved Champion's entry to fourth and completed an Audi sweep of the first four positions. Despite a fuel pressure issue and a minor crash by co-driver Nicolas Minassian, Sébastien Bourdais drove the No. 17 Pescarolo C60 to fifth. The No. 15 Racing for Holland Dome car improved to sixth with the No. 6 Rollcentre Racing Dallara SP1 entry seventh. Courage No. 31 C65's LMP2 lap time moved the car to eleventh overall, ahead of the clutch-stricken No. 15 Racing for Holland car. It remained eleven seconds ahead of the Epsilon Sport team. Corvette Racing maintained its lead in LMGTS, with Gavin's No. 64 C5-R improving its best lap to 3:52.158. He was over two seconds faster than Fellows' No. 63 entry and a second faster than Enge's No. 66 Prodrive Ferrari, which collided with a barrier at Indianapolis corner. Bergmesiter improved the No. 90 White Lightning Porsche's best lap in LMGT to 4:09.679, finishing three seconds ahead of the JMB Ferrari.

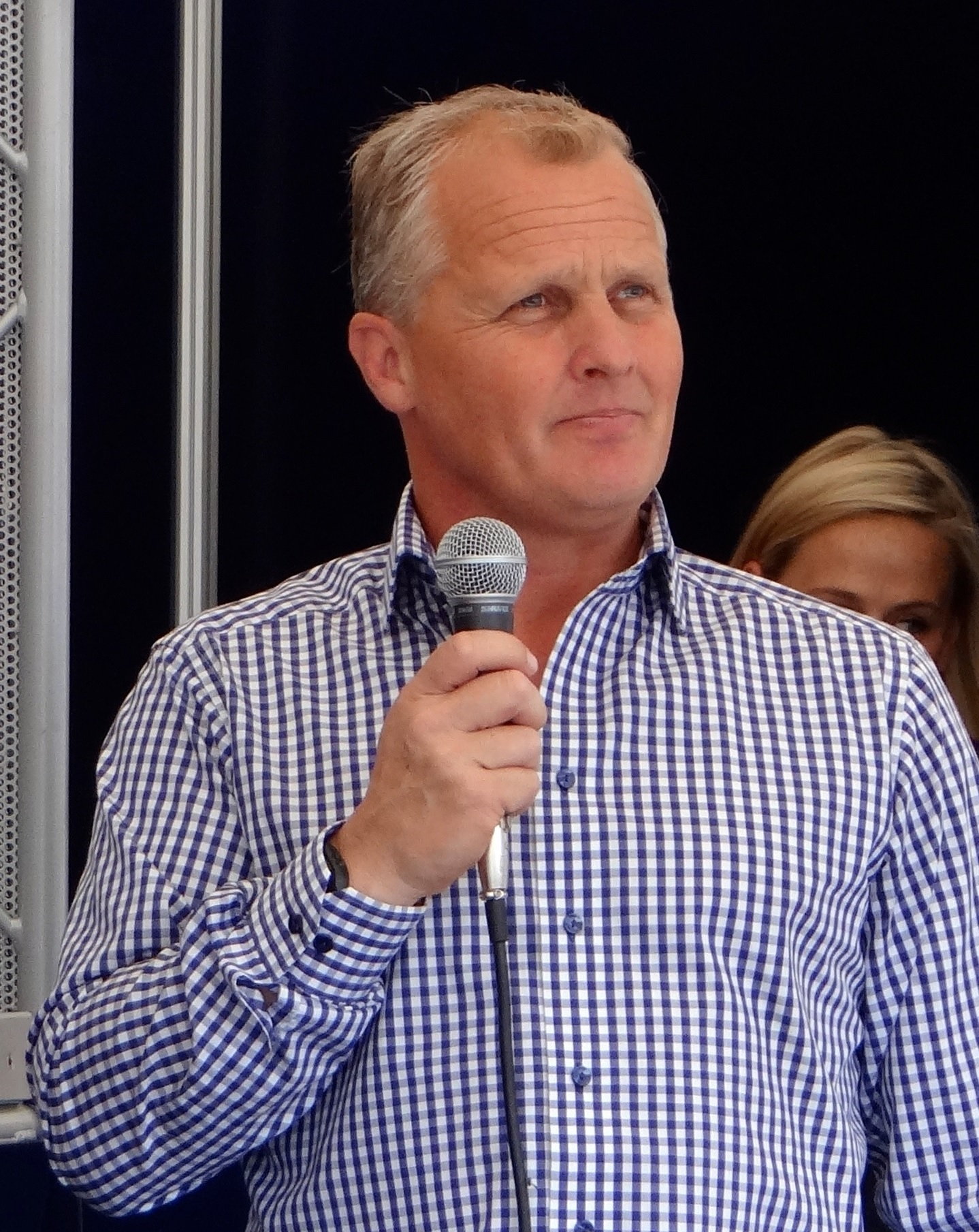
Johnny Herbert (pictured in 2014) took the overall pole position in the No. 88 Audi Sport UK Team Veloqx R8.

Rain showers on 10 June removed car rubber from the track, and lap times in the third session were expected to be slower than before. However, ambient and track temperatures rose, allowing drivers to improve on their previous day's lap times. McNish went fastest overall before his Audi Sport UK teammate Herbert recorded the fastest lap at 3:33.024 on a new gurney flap with five minutes to go. Brabham, driving the No. 22 Zytek 04S, advanced from provisional seventh to third with his first clear lap of the weekend. Rinaldo Capello improved Team Goh Audi's best lap, but the team fell to fourth and the Champion car to fifth. Bourdais set a lap that kept the No. 17 Pescarolo C60 in sixth place, while Katoh was the fastest of the Dome S101 cars in seventhlace. Gounon's No. 31 Courage C65 car continued to lead LMP2, while the Paul Belmondo Racing team was second. In LMGTS, Rydell's No. 65 Prodrive Ferrari took the lead, which he held until Gavin's 3:49.750 lap in the No. 64 Corvette reset the class lap record ten minutes later. The second Corvette, driven by Johnny O'Connell, was third with Kox's other Prodrive Ferrari fourth. In the LMGT category, Sascha Maassen's No. 90 White Lightning Porsche improved its lap time to 4:07.394. Mike Rockenfeller's No. 87 Orbit car finished second, less than two seconds behind. Stéphane Ortelli's No. 85 Freisinger Motorsport entry was third.

Herbert's No. 88 Audi set a new fastest time of 3:32.838 eight minutes into the final session. He set the fastest time to earn his first pole position at Le Mans and the fourth of his racing career. McNish improved the No. 8 Audi's time to join Herbert on the front row after missing much of the session due to a lack of power caused by a failed fuel injector, necessitating an engine change. Brabham was unable to improve on his third session lap and started from third. Kristensen bettered Team Goh Audi's best time but remained in fourth, as Bourdais took fifth in the No. 17 Pescarolo C60 car. Werner's Champion Audi went faster for sixth after a front shock absorber repair, and Katoh took seventh. Gounon gave the Courage team the LMP2 pole position by improving the No. 31 car's best lap to 3:41.126 and finishing 12th overall. The Paul Belmondo Racing team was second in its class, ten seconds slower. After the No. 66 Prodrive Ferrari was damaged in an accident at the Porsche Curves, Enge took the lead from Gavin's No. 64 Corvette in LMGTS with a 3:49.438-second lap with ten minutes to go in the session. O'Connell's No. 63 Corvette improved to third place. White Lightning's third session lap secured the LMGT category pole position, with Jaime Melo's JMB Ferrari and Rockenfeller's Orbit Porsche second and third in class, respectively.

=== Qualifying results ===
Pole position winners in each class are indicated in bold. The fastest time set by each entry is denoted in gray.

Final qualifying classification
Pos	Class	No.	Team	Car	Day 1	Day 2	Gap	Grid
**1**	**LMP1**	**88**	**Audi Sport UK Team Veloqx**	**Audi R8**	3:34.907	**3:32:838**	—	**1**
2	LMP1	8	Audi Sport UK Team Veloqx	Audi R8	3:34.683	**3:33.233**	+0.385	2
3	LMP1	22	Zytek Engineering Ltd.	Zytek 04S	3:41.181	**3:33.923**	+1.085	3
4	LMP1	5	Audi Sport Japan Team Goh	Audi R8	3:35.169	**3:34.038**	+1.200	4
5	LMP1	17	Pescarolo Sport	Pescarolo C60	3:36.801	**3:34.252**	+1.414	5
6	LMP1	2	Champion Racing	Audi R8	3:35.892	**3:34.927**	+2.091	6
7	LMP1	9	Kondo Racing	Dome S101	3:42.143	**3:36.285**	+3.447	7
8	LMP1	15	Racing for Holland	Dome S101	3:37.323	**3:36.353**	+3.515	8
9	LMP1	6	Rollcentre Racing	Dallara SP1	**3:39.260**	3:42.278	+6.422	9
10	LMP1	16	Racing for Holland	Dome S101	3:43.122	**3:40.261**	+7.453	10
11	LMP1	18	Pescarolo Sport	Pescarolo C60	**3:40.399**	3:42.764	+7.561	11
**12**	**LMP2**	**31**	**Courage Compétition**	**Courage C65**	3:42.592	**3:41.126**	**+8.288**	**12**
13	LMP1	25	Ray Mallock Ltd.	MG-Lola EX257	3:48.147	**3:42.298**	+9.460	13
14	LMP1	14	Team Nasamax	Nasamax DM139	3:49.779	**3:42.429**	+9.591	14
15	LMP1	20	Lister Racing	Lister Storm LMP	3:49.542	**3:43.760**	+11.877	15
16	LMP1	27	Intersport Racing	Lola B01/60	3:52.862	**3:48.670**	+14.742	16
**17**	**LMGTS**	**66**	**Prodrive Racing**	**Ferrari 550-GTS Maranello**	3:56.493	**3:49.438**	**+17.600**	**17**
18	LMGTS	64	Corvette Racing	Chevrolet Corvette C5-R	3:52.158	**3:49.750**	+17.912	18
19	LMP1	4	Taurus Sports Racing	Lola B2K/10	3:55.780	**3:50.703**	+18.865	19
20	LMGTS	63	Corvette Racing	Chevrolet Corvette C5-R	3:54.612	**3:51.378**	+19.540	20
21	LMGTS	65	Prodrive Racing	Ferrari 550-GTS Maranello	3:58.493	**3:51.755**	+19.817	21
22	LMP2	37	Paul Belmondo Racing	Courage C65	6:14.788	**3:51.862**	+19.955	22
23	LMP1	29	Noël del Bello Racing	Reynard 2KQ	3:59.257	**3:53.640**	+20.733	23
24	LMGTS	69	Larbre Compétition	Ferrari 550-GTS Maranello	3:56.920	**3:55.500**	+23.593	24
25	LMP1	11	Panoz Motor Sports	Panoz GTP	4:06.515	**3:57.816**	+24.978	25
26	LMP2	35	Epsilon Sport	Courage C65	**3:57.850**	3:58.831	+25.993	26
27	LMGTS	62	Barron Connor Racing	Ferrari 575-GTC	**4:00.714**	4:05.437	+26.876	27
28	LMP2	32	Intersport Racing	Lola B2K/40	4:08.824	**4:01.679**	+28.841	28
29	LMP2	36	Gerard Welter	WR LM2004	4:08.708	**4:05.163**	+32.325	29
30	LMP2	24	Rachel Welter	WR LM2001	**4:05.852**	4:10.264	+33.014	30
31	LMGTS	61	Barron Connor Racing	Ferrari 575-GTC	**4:06.375**	N/A	+33.537	31
**32**	**LMGT**	**90**	**White Lightning Racing**	**Porsche 911 GT3-RSR**	4:09.679	**4:07.394**	**+34.546**	**32**
33	LMGT	70	JMB Racing	Ferrari 360 Modena GTC	4:11.025	**4:08.484**	+35.636	33
34	LMGT	84	Orbit Racing	Porsche 911 GT3-RSR	4:14.111	**4:09.079**	+36.241	34
35	LMGT	85	Freisinger Motorsport	Porsche 911 GT3-RSR	4:12.237	**4:10.011**	+37.173	35
36	LMGT	83	Seikel Motorsport	Porsche 911 GT3-RS	4:14.189	**4:11.490**	+38.652	36
37	LMGT	77	ChoroQ Racing Team	Porsche 911 GT3-RSR	4:17.246	**4:12.949**	+40.111	37
38	LMGT	75	Thierry Perrier	Porsche 911 GT3-R	**4:13.009**	4:19.943	+40.171	38
39	LMGT	89	Chamberlain-Synergy Motorsport	TVR Tuscan T400R	4:16.184	**4:13.368**	+40.530	39
40	LMGT	84	Seikel Motorsport	Porsche 911 GT3-RS	4:23.613	**4:13.943**	+41.055	40
41	LMP1	10	Taurus Sports Racing	Lola B2K/10	**4:14.380**	10:49.177	+41.497	41
42	LMGT	72	Luc Alphand Aventures	Porsche 911 GT3-RS	4:18.735	**4:14.785**	+41.952	42
43	LMGT	92	Cirtek Motorsport	Ferrari 360 Modena GTC	4:20.522	**4:18.768**	+44.940	43
44	LMGT	86	Freisinger Motorsport	Porsche 911 GT3-RSR	**4:18.973**	4:28.136	+45.145	44
45	LMGT	96	Chamberlain-Synergy Motorsport	TVR Tuscan T400R	**4:19.980**	4:27.642	+46.153	45
46	LMGT	81	The Racer's Group	Porsche 911 GT3-RSR	**4:20.010**	4:21.319	+46.183	46
47	LMGT	78	PK Sport Ltd.	Porsche 911 GT3-RS	**4:21.277**	4:23.109	+47.439	47
48	LMGT	80	Morgan Works Race Team	Morgan Aero 8R	4:30.355	**4:24.080**	+51.248	48

== Warm-up ==
The drivers had a 45-minute warm-up session at 09:00 Central European Summer Time (UTC+02:00) in clear weather. Teams used warm-up as a final opportunity to check car setup and reliability. Lehto's No. 2 Champion Audi set the fastest time of 3:36.078. The two Audi Sport UK R8s were second and third, with the No. 8 narrowly ahead of the No. 88. Bourdais' No. 17 Pescarolo C60 car came fourth. The Team Goh Audi was fifth, followed by the Lammers' Racing for Holland Dome vehicle and the No. 22 Zytek 04S vehicle. Intersport Racing's Lola car set the fastest LMP2 lap time at 4:05.032. The No. 63 Corvette led LMGTS, while JMB's No. 70 Ferrari led LMGT. Although the session passed without major incident, Bourdais' engine cover came off his Pescarolo C60 car, and several drivers ran into the trackside gravel traps.

== Race ==
=== Start ===
The weather at the start before 200,000 people was overcast with an air temperature of 25 °C (77 °F) and a track temperature of 28 °C (82 °F). At 16:00 local time, François Fillon, Minister of National Education, Higher Education, and Research, waved the French tricolour to begin the race, which was led by pole sitter Jamie Davies. There were 48 cars scheduled to start, but the No. 10 Lola B2K/10 and the No. 61 Barron Connor Racing Ferrari 575-GTC started from the pit lane due to clutch and engine changes, respectively. The No. 14 Team Nasamax DM139 was forced off the track after a fuel consumption test, but it rejoined the grid. Davies held off teammate McNish into the Dunlop Curve to lead the opening laps. The other two Audis of Lehto and Capello, as well as Lammers' Racing for Holland Dome entry, passed Andy Wallace's Zytek car, demoting it from third to sixth. The top five LMGTS cars were nose-to-tail, with Kox leading and Lammers had a throttle sensor problem on the Mulsanne, falling to 24th. Capello spun into a gravel trap at the Dunlop Curves four laps later and rejoined behind Lammers. Before the first hour ended, Capello's Team's electronic control unit was replaced. Goh's Audi dropped him off the lead lap as Gavin's Corvette took the lead of LMGTS. His teammate Fellows was forced to enter the pit lane after colliding with a tyre barrier at Arnage corner. Repairs to the No. 63 car's front cost it five laps and O'Connell replaced Fellows.

On 1 hour and 52 minutes, McNish and Lehto's cars lost control when they drove onto a patch of oil laid on the track by another car at the entrance to the Porsche Curves, spun across a gravel trap and crashed into a tyre barrier in unison, temporarily knocking McNish unconscious. McNish and Lehto were able to return to the garage for extensive repairs after both cars sustained significant damage. McNish collapsed shortly after leaving the garage in the No. 8 car, and two doctors examined him. He was taken to the circuit's medical centre with a sore knee and a concussion. Although McNish did not sustain any serious injury, doctors ruled him unfit for the rest of the event and he was released from hospital. The safety cars were deployed to slow the race as marshals cleared debris from the track. Brabham's Zytek suffered bodywork damage from a puncture as the safety cars were recalled, and John Field crashed the No. 27 Intersport Lola car at the second Mulsanne Chicane. Later in the second hour, the Champion and Team Goh Audi entries returned to the track outside of the top 40 overall positions. Ryō Michigami's No. 9 Kondo Dome vehicle had a transmission failure on the final third of the lap and he drove to the garage for repairs. He fell to fifth, behind Érik Comas No. 18 Pescarolo C60 car and Katsutomo Kaneishi's No. 15 Racing for Holland car. The attrition rate promoted Sam Hancock's No. 31 Courage C65 car to sixth overall.

Smith's No. 88 Audi R8 led Team Goh's Seiji Ara by one lap at the front of the pitch. Enge set the fastest LMGTS lap time of 3:53.327, trailing the class-leading Jan Magnussen's No. 64 Corvette by 17 seconds. Lammers' Racing for Holland Dome car overtook Benoît Tréluyer's No. 17 Pescarolo C60 car for third overall until a fuel pump failed and had to be replaced. Hancock's No. 31 Courage C65 car ceded the lead in LMP2 to the sister Epsilon Sport entry, after a faulty rear gearbox selection mechanism required attention from mechanics. Repairs took 20 minutes and dropped the car down the race order. Soon after, Robert Hearn lost control of Freisinger's No. 86 Porsche and collided with the inside barrier at the Karting Esses exit. Hearn was unable to restart the Porsche and retired. After relieving Smith, Herbert responded to Ara's faster pace by closing the gap at the front of the field, which had grown larger after Ara entered a gravel trap on the Mulsanne Straight. McRae's No. 66 Prodrive Ferrari was second in LMGTS until he spun at the Mulsanne Chicane after moving onto a dirty section of track to let a faster LMP car past. After that, his clutch began to slip, and Prodrive replaced it; the resulting pit stop dropped McRae eight laps behind Gavin's LMGTS-leading Corvette.

=== Night ===
With the alternator belt broken, the No. 17 Pescarolo C60 car was driven into the team's garage as night fell. Hayanari Shimoda's No. 22 Zytek car was repaired in 14 minutes and re-entered the top ten. Fellows' No. 63 Corvette was thrown into a barrier after a rear-left puncture on a crest on the Mulsanne Straight. The rear and left-hand corner of the car were severely damaged. When a thick dust cloud obscured Paul Belmondo's vision, the No. 37 Courage C65 car crashed. The car had a puncture in the tub's front-right section and was retired to the garage. The accident prompted a second brief safety car intervention. As the safety car period ended, Darren Turner spun the No. 65 Prodrive Ferrari into a gravel trap at the Dunlop Chicane, and Chris Dyson made a pit stop after driving the No. 15 Racing for Holland car into a gravel trap. At midnight, the two lead Audis were separated by a lap, and Lehto drew closer to the LMGTS class leader, the No. 64 Corvette, which was fifth overall. In the Porsche Curves, Maassen slid the No. 90 White Lightning Porsche on oil, but he still led the LMGT class. Lehto overtook Beretta to take the lead over all LMGTS entries, bringing the number of Audis in the top five overall to three.

After Davies' No. 88 Audi received a stop-and-go penalty for passing under yellow flag conditions, he and Magnussen collided at the Ford Chicane, sending the No. 64 Corvette into a trackside tyre wall. Davies and Magnussen were able to return to the pit lane for repairs. The incident gave Alain Menu's No. 66 Prodrive Ferrari the lead in LMGTS, and the gap between Davies and Kristensen was reduced to less than one lap. The No. 66 Prodrive Ferrari was later forced to enter the pit lane with a suspected misfire though it was later discovered that a section of rubber was lodged inside an air restrictor. Menu's Ferrari spent seven minutes undergoing repairs; it rejoined the race with his lead in the LMGTS category over the No. 64 Corvette lowered from four to 2 1/2 laps and the Kondo Dome moved ahead of him. The No. 90 White Lightning Porsche continued to lead the LMGT class but in the eleventh hour, the car ceded the lead it had held for the majority of the race when Bergmeister entered the pit lane to replace a broken shifter linkage cable on its sequential gearbox and to change brakes. Patrick Long relieved Bergmeister and returned to the track in second, three laps behind Ralf Kelleners' No. 85 Freisinger Porsche. The No. 32 Intersport Lola car of William Binnie was required to enter the pit lane with a broken right-rear halfshaft but the car rejoined the circuit more than half an hour later without losing the lead in LMP2.

The No. 22 Zytek car began leaking oil across the circuit at the Porsche Curves as the race approached half distance, possibly due to a broken chunk of bodywork hitting an oil union as the engine compartment caught fire due to a lack of oil pressure. As the safety cars were dispatched for the third time, Brabham drove the car into the pit lane with flames erupting from its compartment bay. During the safety car period, Kristensen brought the Team Goh Audi into the pit lane to correct a two-hour misfire and the Barron Connor No. 61 Ferrari experienced a left-front brake disc fire that required the car's retirement after mechanics were unable to extinguish the fire and a change of uprights on its suspension system failed to work. Gavin damaged the No. 64 Corvette's front when he missed the braking point for the first Mulsanne Chicane in the 12th hour. A 15-minute pit stop dropped the Corvette to 11th overall, six laps behind Kox's LMGTS-leading No. 66 Prodrive Ferrari. Soon after, Turner's No. 65 Prodrive Ferrari experienced gear selection issues, and the car spent the majority of the past hour in the garage, falling to fifth in LMGTS. The safety cars separated the field at the front, with Herbert's Audi Sport UK R8 one lap ahead of Ara's Team Goh R8.

=== Morning to early afternoon ===
Pirro's Champion Audi was fifth early in the morning but fell behind Martin Short's No. 6 Rollcentre Dallara SP1 car owing to an eight-minute brake disc change. The No. 17 Pescarolo vehicle passed Enge for eighth overall. Intersport's Clint Field picked up a right-rear puncture, causing the No. 31 Lola to spin out of the Ford Curves before entering the pit lane. He was able to return to the pit lane for a replacement wheel, and the Lola maintained its lead in LMP2. Short's No. 6 Dallara was hit from behind by Bourdais' No. 17 Pescarolo entry while lapping the car after the Dunlop Curve and beached in a gravel trap before the end of the 15th hour. Short was extricated from the gravel by trackside equipment and continued in fourth place. Davies' No. 88 Audi Sport UK R8 returned to the garage for seven minutes to correct a handling imbalance caused by a seized rear suspension pushrod bearing, promoting Capello's Team Goh car to the lead. Short's No. 6 Dallara car, which lost fourth to the Champion Audi, suffered a left-rear suspension failure in the Karting Esses. The car spun 360 degrees before crashing broadside into a tyre barrier at high speed. Short was unharmed, but the car was damaged and was retired.

At this point, Davies set the race's fastest lap at 3:34.264 to lower Capello's lead. Comas maintained third place by driving the No. 17 Pescarolo car into the pit lane for engine repairs. Pirro, in fourth, ran straight at the Mulsanne Corner and beached the Champion Audi R8 in a gravel trap. He recovered with the help of marshals, made a pit stop for new tyres, and Lehto relieved him. Capello, the race leader, soon locked his tyres and ran through the second Mulsanne Chicane. He drove the Team Goh Audi into the pit lane due to a heavily flat spotted tyre disintegrating and Kristensen took over the No. 5 car. Tréluyer's No. 17 Pescarolo 60 car launched over a kerb at a Mulsanne Chicane, and a subsequent crash into the barrier dropped him to third behind Lehto's Champion Audi R8. Enge's No. 66 Prodrive Ferrari was leading the LMGTS category by five laps when its front-left wheel bearing seized in the Dunlop Chicane, damaging the front splitter. The car was returned to the garage, giving Beretta's No. 64 Corvette the class lead. Davies spun the No. 88 Audi Sport UK R8 at the Dunlop Chicane, but the error cost him little time. Further down the order, the No. 85 Freisinger Porsche suffered an oil feed problem, allowing White Lightning to take the lead of LMGT.

When fuel was spilt on the rear of Capello's R8 and ignited, Team Goh became concerned. Capello quickly exited the car as flames spread to its right rear, though marshals extinguished the fire. Capello resumed driving after 30 seconds after mechanics checked for damage. The incident allowed Davies' No. 88 Audi Sport UK R8 to close to within 90 seconds of the Team Goh Audi, but then slower traffic delayed him. Over an hour after losing the LMGTS lead, Menu, driving the No. 66 Prodrive Ferrari, was forced to replace the front splitter in order to correct a handling issue. It did not, however, result in an improvement, and Menu drove into the garage for additional undertray repairs. Enge replaced Menu and damaged the front of the Ferrari during his first lap out of the pit lane when he collided with a wall at Indianapolis corner. He fell to fourth in class, trailing Papis' No. 63 Corvette and Rydell's No. 65 Prodrive Ferrari. ChoroQ Racing Team moved to second in LMGT after Freisinger's Porsche of Ortelli developed a misfire and fell to third in class.

=== Finish ===
Ara's No. 5 Team Goh Audi held off Herbert's faster No. 88 Audi Sport UK car in the race's final two hours to take Audi's fourth win in five years at Le Mans by 41.354 seconds, completing 379 laps at a distance of 5,169.9 km (3,212.4 mi) and an average speed of 215.418 km/h (133.855 mph). It was Ara's first Le Mans win, Capello's second and Kristensen's sixth since his first victory in 1997. Kristensen equalled Jacky Ickx's all-time record of six victories and was the first driver to win the 24-hour race five times in a row. Ara became the second Japanese driver to win Le Mans outright and the first since 1995. Champion Racing recovered from its crash in the second hour to finish third. The highest-placed non-Audi was the No. 18 Pescarolo C60 car of Ayari, Comas and Tréluyer in fourth and Frank Biela and Kaffer's No. 8 Audi Sport UK R8 finished fifth. Although Corvette Racing ran out of spare parts because of the incidents it was involved in, the No. 63 held an 11-lap lead over the No. 64 to finish sixth overall and win the category, earning the team their third class victory. McRae, Rydell, and Turner's No. 65 Prodrive Ferrari finished third in class, ahead of Enge, Kox, and Menu's No. 66 car. Porsche took the first six positions in the LMGT class as the No. 90 White Lightning entry won its second consecutive category race following its 2003 victory with Alex Job Racing, bringing the Porsche 911-GT3 RS's total Le Mans class victories to six since its debut in the 1999 edition. Team Nasamax's bio-ethanol-powered DM138 finished 17th, making it the first renewable-fuelled car to complete the Le Mans race. The No. 32 Intersport crew won the LMP2 class, finishing 25th overall and eight laps ahead of the No. 24 Rachel Welter WR LM2001 car, the only other finishing competitor in the category.

== Official results ==
The minimum number of laps for classification (70 per cent of the overall winning car's race distance) was 265 laps. Class winners are denoted with bold.

Final race classification
Pos	Class	No.	Team	Drivers	Chassis	Tyre	Laps	Time/Retired
Pos	Class	No.	Team	Drivers	Engine	Tyre	Laps	Time/Retired
1	LMP1	5	Audi Sport Japan Team Goh	(Japan) Seiji Ara (Italy) Rinaldo Capello (Denmark) Tom Kristensen	Audi R8	M	379	24:00:55.345
1	LMP1	5	Audi Sport Japan Team Goh	(Japan) Seiji Ara (Italy) Rinaldo Capello (Denmark) Tom Kristensen	Audi 3.6L Turbo V8	M	379	24:00:55.345
2	LMP1	88	(United Kingdom) Audi Sport UK Team Veloqx	(United Kingdom) Jamie Davies (United Kingdom) Johnny Herbert (United Kingdom) Guy Smith	Audi R8	M	379	+41.354
2	LMP1	88	(United Kingdom) Audi Sport UK Team Veloqx	(United Kingdom) Jamie Davies (United Kingdom) Johnny Herbert (United Kingdom) Guy Smith	Audi 3.6L Turbo V8	M	379	+41.354
3	LMP1	2	(United States) ADT Champion Racing	(Finland) JJ Lehto (Germany) Marco Werner (Italy) Emanuele Pirro	Audi R8	M	368	+11 Laps
3	LMP1	2	(United States) ADT Champion Racing	(Finland) JJ Lehto (Germany) Marco Werner (Italy) Emanuele Pirro	Audi 3.6L Turbo V8	M	368	+11 Laps
4	LMP1	18	(France) Pescarolo Sport	(France) Soheil Ayari (France) Érik Comas (France) Benoît Tréluyer	Pescarolo C60	M	361	+18 Laps
4	LMP1	18	(France) Pescarolo Sport	(France) Soheil Ayari (France) Érik Comas (France) Benoît Tréluyer	Judd GV5 5.0L V10	M	361	+18 Laps
5	LMP1	8	(United Kingdom) Audi Sport UK Team Veloqx	(United Kingdom) Allan McNish (Germany) Frank Biela (Germany) Pierre Kaffer	Audi R8	M	350	+29 Laps
5	LMP1	8	(United Kingdom) Audi Sport UK Team Veloqx	(United Kingdom) Allan McNish (Germany) Frank Biela (Germany) Pierre Kaffer	Audi 3.6L Turbo V8	M	350	+29 Laps
6	GTS	64	(United States) Corvette Racing	(United Kingdom) Oliver Gavin (Monaco) Olivier Beretta (Denmark) Jan Magnussen	Chevrolet Corvette C5-R	M	345	+34 Laps
6	GTS	64	(United States) Corvette Racing	(United Kingdom) Oliver Gavin (Monaco) Olivier Beretta (Denmark) Jan Magnussen	Chevrolet 7.0L V8	M	345	+34 Laps
7	LMP1	15	(Netherlands) Racing for Holland	(Netherlands) Jan Lammers (United States) Chris Dyson (Japan) Katsutomo Kaneishi	Dome S101	D	341	+38 Laps
7	LMP1	15	(Netherlands) Racing for Holland	(Netherlands) Jan Lammers (United States) Chris Dyson (Japan) Katsutomo Kaneishi	Judd GV4 4.0L V10	D	341	+38 Laps
8	GTS	63	(United States) Corvette Racing	(Canada) Ron Fellows (Italy) Max Papis (United States) Johnny O'Connell	Chevrolet Corvette C5-R	M	334	+45 Laps
8	GTS	63	(United States) Corvette Racing	(Canada) Ron Fellows (Italy) Max Papis (United States) Johnny O'Connell	Chevrolet 7.0L V8	M	334	+45 Laps
9	GTS	65	(United Kingdom) Prodrive Racing	(United Kingdom) Darren Turner (United Kingdom) Colin McRae (Sweden) Rickard Rydell	Ferrari 550-GTS Maranello	M	329	+50 Laps
9	GTS	65	(United Kingdom) Prodrive Racing	(United Kingdom) Darren Turner (United Kingdom) Colin McRae (Sweden) Rickard Rydell	Ferrari F133 5.9L V12	M	329	+50 Laps
10	GT	90	(United States) White Lightning Racing	(Germany) Jörg Bergmeister (United States) Patrick Long (Germany) Sascha Maassen	Porsche 911 GT3-RSR	M	327	+52 Laps
10	GT	90	(United States) White Lightning Racing	(Germany) Jörg Bergmeister (United States) Patrick Long (Germany) Sascha Maassen	Porsche 3.6L Flat-6	M	327	+52 Laps
11	GTS	66	(United Kingdom) Prodrive Racing	(Switzerland) Alain Menu (Netherlands) Peter Kox (Czech Republic) Tomáš Enge	Ferrari 550-GTS Maranello	M	325	+54 Laps
11	GTS	66	(United Kingdom) Prodrive Racing	(Switzerland) Alain Menu (Netherlands) Peter Kox (Czech Republic) Tomáš Enge	Ferrari F133 5.9L V12	M	325	+54 Laps
12	GT	77	(Japan) ChoroQ Racing Team	(Japan) Haruki Kurosawa (Japan) Kazuyuki Nishizawa (Japan) Manabu Orido	Porsche 911 GT3-RSR	Y	322	+57 Laps
12	GT	77	(Japan) ChoroQ Racing Team	(Japan) Haruki Kurosawa (Japan) Kazuyuki Nishizawa (Japan) Manabu Orido	Porsche 3.6L Flat-6	Y	322	+57 Laps
13	GT	85	(Germany) Freisinger Motorsport	(Monaco) Stéphane Ortelli (Germany) Ralf Kelleners (France) Romain Dumas	Porsche 911 GT3-RSR	D	321	+58 Laps
13	GT	85	(Germany) Freisinger Motorsport	(Monaco) Stéphane Ortelli (Germany) Ralf Kelleners (France) Romain Dumas	Porsche 3.6L Flat-6	D	321	+58 Laps
14	GTS	69	(France) Larbre Compétition	(France) Christophe Bouchut (France) Patrice Goueslard (France) Olivier Dupard	Ferrari 550-GTS Maranello	M	317	+62 Laps
14	GTS	69	(France) Larbre Compétition	(France) Christophe Bouchut (France) Patrice Goueslard (France) Olivier Dupard	Ferrari F133 5.9L V12	M	317	+62 Laps
15	GT	84	(Germany) Seikel Motorsport	(Canada) Anthony Burgess (United States) Philip Collin (New Zealand) Andrew Bagnall	Porsche 911 GT3-RS	Y	317	+62 Laps
15	GT	84	(Germany) Seikel Motorsport	(Canada) Anthony Burgess (United States) Philip Collin (New Zealand) Andrew Bagnall	Porsche 3.6L Flat-6	Y	317	+62 Laps
16	GT	72	(France) Luc Alphand Aventures	(France) Luc Alphand (France) Christian Lavieille (France) Philippe Alméras	Porsche 911 GT3-RS	M	316	+63 Laps
16	GT	72	(France) Luc Alphand Aventures	(France) Luc Alphand (France) Christian Lavieille (France) Philippe Alméras	Porsche 3.6L Flat-6	M	316	+63 Laps
17	LMP1	14	(United Kingdom) Team Nasamax (United Kingdom) McNeil Engineering	(Canada) Robbie Stirling (South Africa) Werner Lupberger (United Kingdom) Kevin McGarrity	Nasamax DM139 (Reynard)	D	316	+63 Laps
17	LMP1	14	(United Kingdom) Team Nasamax (United Kingdom) McNeil Engineering	(Canada) Robbie Stirling (South Africa) Werner Lupberger (United Kingdom) Kevin McGarrity	Judd GV5 5.0L V10 (Bioethanol)	D	316	+63 Laps
18	GT	81	(United States) The Racer's Group	(Denmark) Lars-Erik Nielsen (United Kingdom) Ian Donaldson (United Kingdom) Gregor Fisken	Porsche 911 GT3-RSR	M	314	+65 Laps
18	GT	81	(United States) The Racer's Group	(Denmark) Lars-Erik Nielsen (United Kingdom) Ian Donaldson (United Kingdom) Gregor Fisken	Porsche 3.6L Flat-6	M	314	+65 Laps
19	GT	92	(United Kingdom) Cirtek Motorsport	(United Kingdom) Frank Mountain (Netherlands) Hans Hugenholtz (New Zealand) Rob Wilson	Ferrari 360 Modena GTC	D	311	+68 Laps
19	GT	92	(United Kingdom) Cirtek Motorsport	(United Kingdom) Frank Mountain (Netherlands) Hans Hugenholtz (New Zealand) Rob Wilson	Ferrari F131 3.6L V8	D	311	+68 Laps
20	LMP1	4	(United Kingdom) Taurus Sports Racing	(United Kingdom) Christian Vann (Switzerland) Benjamin Leuenberger (France) Didier André	Lola B2K/10	M	300	+79 Laps
20	LMP1	4	(United Kingdom) Taurus Sports Racing	(United Kingdom) Christian Vann (Switzerland) Benjamin Leuenberger (France) Didier André	Judd GV4 4.0L V10	M	300	+79 Laps
21	GT	89	(United Kingdom) Chamberlain-Synergy Motorsport	(United Kingdom) Bob Berridge (United Kingdom) Michael Caine (United Kingdom) Chris Stockton	TVR Tuscan T400R	D	300	+79 Laps
21	GT	89	(United Kingdom) Chamberlain-Synergy Motorsport	(United Kingdom) Bob Berridge (United Kingdom) Michael Caine (United Kingdom) Chris Stockton	TVR Speed Six 4.0L I6	D	300	+79 Laps
22	GT	96	(United Kingdom) Chamberlain-Synergy Motorsport	(United Kingdom) Lawrence Tomlinson (United Kingdom) Nigel Greensall (United Kingdom) Gareth Evans	TVR Tuscan T400R	D	291	+88 Laps
22	GT	96	(United Kingdom) Chamberlain-Synergy Motorsport	(United Kingdom) Lawrence Tomlinson (United Kingdom) Nigel Greensall (United Kingdom) Gareth Evans	TVR Speed Six 4.0L I6	D	291	+88 Laps
23	GT	75	(France) Thierry Perrier (France) Perspective Racing	(United Kingdom) Ian Khan (United Kingdom) Nigel Smith (United Kingdom) Tim Sugden	Porsche 911 GT3-RS	D	283	+96 Laps
23	GT	75	(France) Thierry Perrier (France) Perspective Racing	(United Kingdom) Ian Khan (United Kingdom) Nigel Smith (United Kingdom) Tim Sugden	Porsche 3.6L Flat-6	D	283	+96 Laps
24	LMP1	20	(United Kingdom) Lister Racing	(Denmark) John Nielsen (Denmark) Casper Elgaard (Denmark) Jens Møller	Lister Storm LMP	D	279	+100 Laps
24	LMP1	20	(United Kingdom) Lister Racing	(Denmark) John Nielsen (Denmark) Casper Elgaard (Denmark) Jens Møller	Chevrolet LS1 6.0L V8	D	279	+100 Laps
25	LMP2	32	(United States) Intersport Racing	(United States) William Binnie (United States) Clint Field (United States) Rick Sutherland	Lola B2K/40	P	278	+101 Laps
25	LMP2	32	(United States) Intersport Racing	(United States) William Binnie (United States) Clint Field (United States) Rick Sutherland	Judd KV675 3.4L V8	P	278	+101 Laps
26	LMP2	24	(France) Rachel Welter	(Japan) Yojiro Terada (France) Patrice Roussel (France) Olivier Porta	WR LM2001	M	270	+109 Laps
26	LMP2	24	(France) Rachel Welter	(Japan) Yojiro Terada (France) Patrice Roussel (France) Olivier Porta	Peugeot 2.0L Turbo I4	M	270	+109 Laps
27 NC	GT	80	(United Kingdom) Morgan Works Race Team	(United Kingdom) Adam Sharpe (New Zealand) Neil Cunningham (United Kingdom) Steve Hyde	Morgan Aero 8R	Y	222	Insufficient distance
27 NC	GT	80	(United Kingdom) Morgan Works Race Team	(United Kingdom) Adam Sharpe (New Zealand) Neil Cunningham (United Kingdom) Steve Hyde	BMW B44 (Mader) 4.5L V8	Y	222	Insufficient distance
28 DNF	LMP1	16	(Netherlands) Racing for Holland	(Netherlands) Tom Coronel (United Kingdom) Justin Wilson (United Kingdom) Ralph Firman	Dome S101	D	313	Ignition
28 DNF	LMP1	16	(Netherlands) Racing for Holland	(Netherlands) Tom Coronel (United Kingdom) Justin Wilson (United Kingdom) Ralph Firman	Judd GV4 4.0L V10	D	313	Ignition
29 DNF	LMP1	17	(France) Pescarolo Sport	(France) Sébastien Bourdais (France) Nicolas Minassian (France) Emmanuel Collard	Pescarolo C60	M	282	Engine
29 DNF	LMP1	17	(France) Pescarolo Sport	(France) Sébastien Bourdais (France) Nicolas Minassian (France) Emmanuel Collard	Judd GV5 5.0L V10	M	282	Engine
30 DNF	LMP1	25	(United Kingdom) Ray Mallock Ltd. (RML)	(Brazil) Thomas Erdos (United Kingdom) Mike Newton (United Kingdom) Nathan Kinch	MG-Lola EX257	D	256	Engine
30 DNF	LMP1	25	(United Kingdom) Ray Mallock Ltd. (RML)	(Brazil) Thomas Erdos (United Kingdom) Mike Newton (United Kingdom) Nathan Kinch	MG (AER) XP20 2.0L Turbo I4	D	256	Engine
31 DNF	LMP1	6	(United Kingdom) Rollcentre Racing	(United Kingdom) Martin Short (United Kingdom) Rob Barff (Portugal) João Barbosa	Dallara SP1	D	230	Crash
31 DNF	LMP1	6	(United Kingdom) Rollcentre Racing	(United Kingdom) Martin Short (United Kingdom) Rob Barff (Portugal) João Barbosa	Judd GV4 4.0L V10	D	230	Crash
32 DNF	GT	87	(United States) Orbit Racing (United States) BAM!	(United States) Leo Hindery Jr. (Germany) Marc Lieb (Germany) Mike Rockenfeller	Porsche 911 GT3-RS	M	223	Gearbox
32 DNF	GT	87	(United States) Orbit Racing (United States) BAM!	(United States) Leo Hindery Jr. (Germany) Marc Lieb (Germany) Mike Rockenfeller	Porsche 3.6L Flat-6	M	223	Gearbox
33 DNF	LMP1	9	(Japan) Kondo Racing	(Japan) Hiroki Katoh (Japan) Ryō Fukuda (Japan) Ryō Michigami	Dome S101	Y	206	Oil leak
33 DNF	LMP1	9	(Japan) Kondo Racing	(Japan) Hiroki Katoh (Japan) Ryō Fukuda (Japan) Ryō Michigami	Mugen MF408S 4.0L V8	Y	206	Oil leak
34 DNF	GTS	62	(Netherlands) Barron Connor Racing	(Netherlands) Mike Hezemans (France) Ange Barde (Switzerland) Jean-Denis Delétraz	Ferrari 575-GTC	P	200	Electronics
34 DNF	GTS	62	(Netherlands) Barron Connor Racing	(Netherlands) Mike Hezemans (France) Ange Barde (Switzerland) Jean-Denis Delétraz	Ferrari F133 6.0L V12	P	200	Electronics
35 DNF	LMP1	22	(United Kingdom) Zytek Engineering, Ltd.	(United Kingdom) Andy Wallace (Australia) David Brabham (Japan) Hayanari Shimoda	Zytek 04S	M	167	Engine
35 DNF	LMP1	22	(United Kingdom) Zytek Engineering, Ltd.	(United Kingdom) Andy Wallace (Australia) David Brabham (Japan) Hayanari Shimoda	Zytek ZG348 3.4L V8	M	167	Engine
36 DNF	GTS	61	(Netherlands) Barron Connor Racing	(Netherlands) John Bosch (United States) Danny Sullivan (Italy) Thomas Biagi	Ferrari 575-GTC	P	163	Brakes
36 DNF	GTS	61	(Netherlands) Barron Connor Racing	(Netherlands) John Bosch (United States) Danny Sullivan (Italy) Thomas Biagi	Ferrari F133 GT 6.0 L V12	P	163	Brakes
37 DNF	GT	83	(Germany) Seikel Motorsport	(Italy) Gabrio Rosa (Netherlands) Peter van Merksteijn (Italy) Alex Caffi	Porsche 911 GT3-RS	Y	148	Engine
37 DNF	GT	83	(Germany) Seikel Motorsport	(Italy) Gabrio Rosa (Netherlands) Peter van Merksteijn (Italy) Alex Caffi	Porsche 3.6L Flat-6	Y	148	Engine
38 DNF	LMP2	36	(France) Gerard Welter	(France) Tristan Gommendy (France) Jean-Bernard Bouvet (France) Bastien Brière	WR LM2004	M	137	Electrical
38 DNF	LMP2	36	(France) Gerard Welter	(France) Tristan Gommendy (France) Jean-Bernard Bouvet (France) Bastien Brière	Peugeot ES9J4S 3.4L V6	M	137	Electrical
39 DNF	GT	70	(France) JMB Racing	(France) Jean-René de Fournoux (Brazil) Jaime Melo (France) Stéphane Daoudi	Ferrari 360 Modena GTC	M	133	Transmission
39 DNF	GT	70	(France) JMB Racing	(France) Jean-René de Fournoux (Brazil) Jaime Melo (France) Stéphane Daoudi	Ferrari F131 3.6L V8	M	133	Transmission
40 DNF	LMP2	31	(France) Courage Compétition	(Switzerland) Alexander Frei (United Kingdom) Sam Hancock (France) Jean-Marc Gounon	Courage C65	M	127	Engine
40 DNF	LMP2	31	(France) Courage Compétition	(Switzerland) Alexander Frei (United Kingdom) Sam Hancock (France) Jean-Marc Gounon	JPX 3.4L V6	M	127	Engine
41 DNF	LMP2	35	(France) Epsilon Sport	(France) Renaud Derlot (United States) Gunnar Jeannette (United Kingdom) Gavin Pickering	Courage C65	M	124	Engine
41 DNF	LMP2	35	(France) Epsilon Sport	(France) Renaud Derlot (United States) Gunnar Jeannette (United Kingdom) Gavin Pickering	Willman (JPX) 3.4L V6	M	124	Engine
42 DNF	LMP1	29	(France) Noël del Bello Racing	(France) Bruno Besson (France) Sylvain Boulay (France) Jean-Luc Maury-Laribière	Reynard 2KQ	M	122	Crash
42 DNF	LMP1	29	(France) Noël del Bello Racing	(France) Bruno Besson (France) Sylvain Boulay (France) Jean-Luc Maury-Laribière	Volkswagen HPT16 2.0L Turbo I4	M	122	Crash
43 DNF	LMP2	37	(France) Paul Belmondo Racing	(France) Paul Belmondo (France) Claude-Yves Gosselin (France) Marco Saviozzi	Courage C65	M	80	Crash
43 DNF	LMP2	37	(France) Paul Belmondo Racing	(France) Paul Belmondo (France) Claude-Yves Gosselin (France) Marco Saviozzi	JPX 3.4L V6	M	80	Crash
44 DNF	GT	86	(Germany) Freisinger Motorsport	(Russia) Aleksey Vasilyev (Russia) Nikolai Fomenko (United Kingdom) Robert Nearn	Porsche 911 GT3-RSR	D	65	Crash
44 DNF	GT	86	(Germany) Freisinger Motorsport	(Russia) Aleksey Vasilyev (Russia) Nikolai Fomenko (United Kingdom) Robert Nearn	Porsche 3.6L Flat-6	D	65	Crash
45 DNF	LMP1	11	(United States) Panoz Motor Sports (France) Larbre Compétition	(France) Patrick Bourdais (France) Jean-Luc Blanchemain (France) Roland Bervillé	Panoz GTP	M	54	Clutch
45 DNF	LMP1	11	(United States) Panoz Motor Sports (France) Larbre Compétition	(France) Patrick Bourdais (France) Jean-Luc Blanchemain (France) Roland Bervillé	Élan 6L8 6.0L V8	M	54	Clutch
46 DNF	LMP1	10	(United Kingdom) Taurus Sports Racing	(United Kingdom) Phil Andrews (United Kingdom) Calum Lockie (Belgium) Anthony Kumpen	Lola B2K/10	D	35	Gearbox
46 DNF	LMP1	10	(United Kingdom) Taurus Sports Racing	(United Kingdom) Phil Andrews (United Kingdom) Calum Lockie (Belgium) Anthony Kumpen	Caterpillar 5.0L Turbo V10 (Diesel)	D	35	Gearbox
47 DNF	LMP1	27	(United States) Intersport Racing	(United States) Jon Field (United States) Duncan Dayton (United States) Larry Connor	Lola B01/60	G	29	Crash
47 DNF	LMP1	27	(United States) Intersport Racing	(United States) Jon Field (United States) Duncan Dayton (United States) Larry Connor	Judd XV675 3.4L V8	G	29	Crash
48 DNF	GT	78	(United Kingdom) PK Sport Ltd.	(United States) Jim Matthews (United Kingdom) David Warnock (United Kingdom) Paul Daniels	Porsche 911 GT3-RS	D	27	Electrical
48 DNF	GT	78	(United Kingdom) PK Sport Ltd.	(United States) Jim Matthews (United Kingdom) David Warnock (United Kingdom) Paul Daniels	Porsche 3.6L Flat-6	D	27	Electrical

Tyre manufacturers
Key
Symbol	Tyre manufacturer
D	Dunlop
G	Goodyear
M	Michelin
P	Pirelli
Y	Yokohama
