= 2006 24 Hours of Le Mans =

74th 24 Hours of Le Mans endurance race

Previous: 2005	Next: 2007
Index: Races | Winners

Circuit de la Sarthe track

The 2006 24 Hours of Le Mans was the 74th Grand Prix of Endurance, and took place over 17–18 June 2006. The winners of the race were Frank Biela, Marco Werner, and Emanuele Pirro, driving the Audi R10 TDI. For the first time in the history of the race, the winner was a diesel-powered car.

== Pre-race ==
Prior to this race the ACO redeveloped the area around the Dunlop Curve and Dunlop Chicane, moving the Dunlop Curve in tighter to create more run-off area, while also turning the Dunlop Chicane into a larger set of turns. As part of the development, a new extended pit lane exit was created for motorcycles running the Bugatti Circuit. This second pit exit re-enters the track just beyond the Dunlop Chicane and before the Dunlop Bridge.

Before the official test days, the FIA requested that the sportscars should also use this new pit lane, and mandated a 60 km/h speed limit for the entire 450m length, instead of using the normal pit exit in the Dunlop Curve as planned. This was originally used for the Le Mans test days, but due to complaints from the teams, the ACO decided to return to the old pit lane exit for the race.

== Qualifying ==
In the LMP1 category, during Wednesday's wet-weather qualifying Pescarolo C60 took the top two spots. Then, a day later, during dry weather conditions the new Audi R10 TDIs overtook the Pescarolos to claim the top two positions.

In LMP2, the Ray Mallock Ltd. Lola ran two seconds quicker than the new Intersport Lola.

In LMGT1, the Aston Martin factory squad swept the front row, with the #64 Corvette right behind them.

In GT2, the French IMSA Performance Matmut Porsche took the quickest time; however, Luca Riccitelli took the car off at Nord du Karting at the end of the session, injuring his ankle and badly damaging the chassis of the car. In a unique move, the ACO went against its own rules and granted permission for the team to replace the chassis with a brand new car. The car was still forced to start at the back of the grid. The Scuderia Ecosse Ferrari 430 thus started at the front for the GT2 class.

=== Qualifying times ===
Class leaders and the fastest lap time on each day are in bold.

Pos	No.	Team	Car	Class	Day 1	Day 2	Behind
1	7	(Germany) **Audi Sport Team Joest**	Audi R10 TDI	LMP1	4:17.189	**3:30.466**	**Leader**
2	8	(Germany) Audi Sport Team Joest	Audi R10 TDI	LMP1	4:17.676	3:30.584	+0.118
3	16	(France) Pescarolo Sport	Pescarolo C60 Hybrid-Judd	LMP1	**4:13.832**	3:32.584	+2.118
4	17	(France) Pescarolo Sport	Pescarolo C60 Hybrid-Judd	LMP1	4:14.447	3:32.990	+2.524
5	13	(France) Courage Compétition	Courage LC70-Mugen	LMP1	4:25.582	3:34.120	+3.654
6	14	(Netherlands) Racing for Holland	Dome S101Hb-Judd	LMP1	4:22.873	3:34.864	+4.398
7	9	(United Kingdom) Creation Autosportif	Creation CA06/H-Judd	LMP1	4:22.021	3:36.459	+5.993
8	2	(United Kingdom) Zytek Engineering	Zytek 06S	LMP1	4:27.754	3:39.252	+8.786
9	5	(Switzerland) Swiss Spirit	Courage LC70-Judd	LMP1	4:23.727	3:40.182	+9.716
10	19	(United Kingdom) Chamberlain-Synergy Motorsport	Lola B06/10-AER	LMP1	4:37.362	3:40.467	+10.001
11	12	(France) Courage Compétition	Courage LC70-Mugen	LMP1	4:35.943	3:40.722	+10.256
12	25	(United Kingdom) **Ray Mallock Ltd.**	**MG-Lola EX264-AER**	LMP2	4:34.940	**3:41.555**	**+11.089**
13	33	(United States) Intersport Racing	Lola B05/40-AER	LMP2	4:34.160	3:43.869	+13.403
14	22	(United Kingdom) Rollcentre Racing	Radical SR9-Judd	LMP2	4:43.803	3:44.324	+13.858
15	39	(United Kingdom) Chamberlain-Synergy Motorsport	Lola B05/40-AER	LMP2	4:37.362	3:45.732	+15.068
16	32	(France) Barazi-Epsilon	Courage C65-AER	LMP2	4:27.357	3:47.467	+17.001
17	37	(France) Paul Belmondo Racing	Courage C65-Mecachrome	LMP2	4:45.086	3:48.846	+18.380
18	27	(United States) Miracle Motorsports	Courage C65-AER	LMP2	4:56.168	3:50.826	+20.360
19	6	(United Kingdom) Lister Storm Racing	Lister Storm LMP Hybrid-Chevrolet	LMP1	4:31.565	3:50.940	+20.476
20	007	(United Kingdom) **Aston Martin Racing**	**Aston Martin DBR9**	GT1	**4:31.179**	**3:52.015**	**+21.559**
21	009	(United Kingdom) Aston Martin Racing	Aston Martin DBR9	GT1	4:32.053	3:52.561	+22.095
22	64	(United States) Corvette Racing	Chevrolet Corvette C6.R	GT1	4:51.557	3:53.100	+22.534
23	20	(France) Pir Competition	Pilbeam MP93-Judd	LMP2	**4:25.398**	3:53.285	+22.819
24	69	(Italy) BMS Scuderia Italia	Aston Martin DBR9	GT1	4:35.531	3:53.611	+23.145
25	67	(Russia) Convers MenX Team	Ferrari 550-GTS Maranello	GT1	4:33.561	3:53.781	+23.315
26	63	(United States) Corvette Racing	Chevrolet Corvette C6.R	GT1	4:54.941	3:53.993	+23.327
27	66	(United States) ACEMCO Motorsports	Saleen S7-R	GT1	4:35.016	3:54.476	+24.010
28	72	(France) Luc Alphand Aventures	Chevrolet Corvette C5-R	GT1	4:42.545	3:55.629	+25.163
29	24	(United States) Binnie Motorsports	Lola B05/42-Zytek	LMP2	4:51.872	3:56.123	+25.657
30	35	(Belgium) G-Force Racing	Courage C65-Judd	LMP2	4:48.714	3:56.452	+25.986
31	36	(France) Paul Belmondo Racing	Courage C65-Mecachrome	LMP2	4:50.408	3:56.460	+25.994
32	62	(United Kingdom) Team Modena	Aston Martin DBR9	GT1	4:35.789	3:57.776	+27.310
33	61	(United Kingdom) Cirtek Motorsport	Ferrari 550-GTS Maranello	GT1	4:40.097	3:59.822	+29.356
34	53	(Japan) JLOC Isao Noritake	Lamborghini Murcielago R-GT	GT1	4:58.656	4:00.287	+29.821
35	30	(France) Gerald Welter	WR LMP04-Peugeot	LMP2	5:15.480	4:00.775	+30.309
36	50	(France) Larbre Compétition	Ferrari 550-GTS Maranello	GT1	4:47.924	4:01.920	+31.454
37	76	(France) **IMSA Performance Matmut**	**Porsche 911 GT3-RSR**	GT2	4:41.623	**4:03.438**	**+32.972**
38	87	(United Kingdom) Scuderia Ecosse	Ferrari F430 GT2	GT2	4:52.423	4:04.596	+34.130
39	83	(Germany) Seikel Motorsport	Porsche 911 GT3-RSR	GT2	4:53.695	4:04.897	+34.431
40	80	(United States) Flying Lizard Motorsports	Porsche 911 GT3-RSR	GT2	4:46.888	4:05.266	+34.800
41	90	(United States) Krohn Racing	Porsche 911 GT3-RSR	GT2	**4:39.912**	4:05.700	+35.234
42	85	(Netherlands) Spyker Squadron BV	Spyker C8 Spyder GT2-R-Audi	GT2	4:48.691	4:06.299	+35.833
43	77	(Canada) Multimatic Team Panoz	Panoz Esperante GT-LM-Ford	GT2	4:55.638	4:06.642	+36.176
44	86	(Netherlands) Spyker Squadron BV	Spyker C8 Spyder GT2-R-Audi	GT2	4:45.916	4:07.939	+37.473
45	89	(United Kingdom) Sebah Automotive Ltd.	Porsche 911 GT3-RSR	GT2	4:54.946	4:08.688	+38.222
46	81	(United Kingdom) Team LNT	Panoz Esperante GT-LM-Ford	GT2	4:50.424	4:12.043	+41.577
47	93	(Japan) Team Taisan Advan	Porsche 911 GT3-RSR	GT2	5:05.305	4:14.477	+44.011
48	73	(Belgium) Ice Pol Racing Team	Porsche 911 GT3-RSR	GT2	4:57.096	4:16.246	+45.780
49	91	(Japan) T2M Motorsport	Porsche 911 GT3-RSR	GT2	5:06.716	4:17.342	+46.876
50	98	(France) Noël del Bello Racing	Porsche 911 GT3-RSR	GT2	5:07.105	4:23.547	+53.081

== Race ==
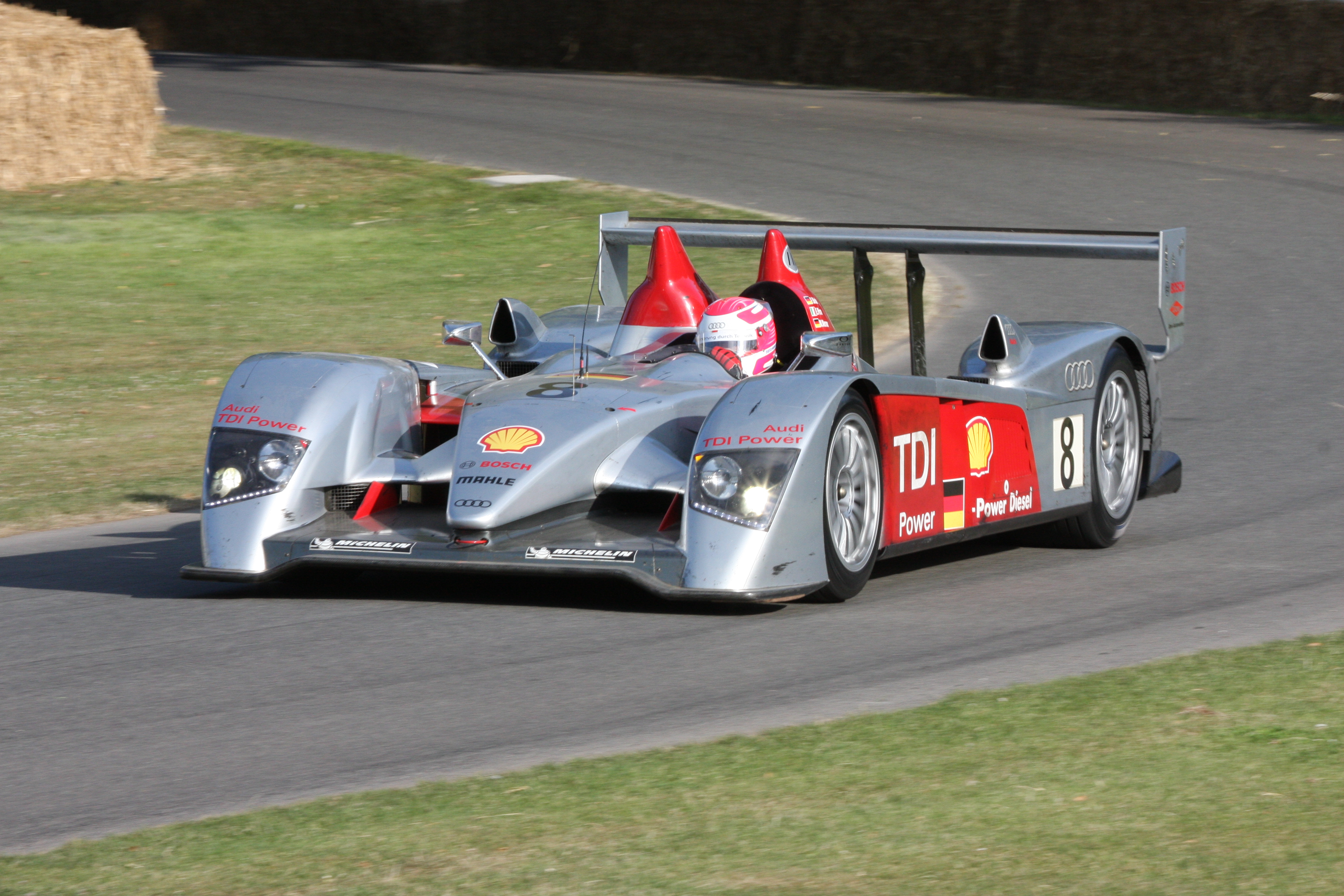
The No. 8 Audi R10 TDI at Goodwood Festival of Speed

This race marked the first Le Mans win for a diesel engined sports car, the Audi R10 TDI, and the second time that a diesel-powered sports car won a major international motorsports event, following the Audi R10 TDI's win at the 2006 12 Hours of Sebring. This was, however, not the first time a diesel-powered racing car had won an international racing event; back in 1998, BMW became the first marque to enter a diesel-powered race winner as they won the Nürburgring 24 Hours with their 320d touring car.

This race also marked the first time since 1991 that Porsche (or a Porsche-powered prototype) did not win a single class in Le Mans. A Panoz Esperante was successful in upsetting the contingent of Porsches in the GT2 class, the only class that did feature Porsche entries.

Corvette Racing's 355-lap pace in their GT1 class win became the record for a homologated GT racer.

== Official results ==
Class winners are marked in bold. Cars not completing 70% of the winner's distance are listed as Not Classified (NC).

Pos	Class Pos.	Class	No	Team	Drivers	Chassis	Tyre	Laps
Pos	Class Pos.	Class	No	Team	Drivers	Engine	Tyre	Laps
1	1	**LMP1**	**8**	**(Germany) Audi Sport Team Joest**	**(Germany) Frank Biela (Germany) Marco Werner (Italy) Emanuele Pirro**	**Audi R10 TDI**	MI	**380**
1	1	**LMP1**	**8**	**(Germany) Audi Sport Team Joest**	**(Germany) Frank Biela (Germany) Marco Werner (Italy) Emanuele Pirro**	**Audi TDI 5.5L Turbo V12 (Diesel)**	MI	**380**
2	2	LMP1	17	(France) Pescarolo Sport	(France) Sébastien Loeb (France) Éric Hélary (France) Franck Montagny	Pescarolo C60 Hybrid	MI	376
2	2	LMP1	17	(France) Pescarolo Sport	(France) Sébastien Loeb (France) Éric Hélary (France) Franck Montagny	Judd GV5 S2 5.0L V10	MI	376
3	3	LMP1	7	(Germany) Audi Sport Team Joest	(Italy) Rinaldo Capello (Denmark) Tom Kristensen (United Kingdom) Allan McNish	Audi R10 TDI	MI	367
3	3	LMP1	7	(Germany) Audi Sport Team Joest	(Italy) Rinaldo Capello (Denmark) Tom Kristensen (United Kingdom) Allan McNish	Audi TDI 5.5L Turbo V12 (Diesel)	MI	367
4	1	**GT1**	**64**	**(United States) Corvette Racing**	**(United Kingdom) Oliver Gavin (Monaco) Olivier Beretta (Denmark) Jan Magnussen**	**Chevrolet Corvette C6.R**	MI	**355**
4	1	**GT1**	**64**	**(United States) Corvette Racing**	**(United Kingdom) Oliver Gavin (Monaco) Olivier Beretta (Denmark) Jan Magnussen**	**Chevrolet LS7R 7.0L V8**	MI	**355**
5	4	LMP1	16	(France) Pescarolo Sport	(France) Emmanuel Collard (France) Érik Comas (France) Nicolas Minassian	Pescarolo C60 Hybrid	MI	352
5	4	LMP1	16	(France) Pescarolo Sport	(France) Emmanuel Collard (France) Érik Comas (France) Nicolas Minassian	Judd GV5 S2 5.0L V10	MI	352
6	2	GT1	007	(United Kingdom) Aston Martin Racing	(Czech Republic) Tomáš Enge (United Kingdom) Darren Turner (Italy) Andrea Piccini	Aston Martin DBR9	MI	350
6	2	GT1	007	(United Kingdom) Aston Martin Racing	(Czech Republic) Tomáš Enge (United Kingdom) Darren Turner (Italy) Andrea Piccini	Aston Martin 6.0L V12	MI	350
7	3	GT1	72	(France) Luc Alphand Aventures	(France) Luc Alphand (France) Patrice Goueslard (France) Jérôme Policand	Chevrolet Corvette C5-R	MI	346
7	3	GT1	72	(France) Luc Alphand Aventures	(France) Luc Alphand (France) Patrice Goueslard (France) Jérôme Policand	Chevrolet LS7R 7.0L V8	MI	346
8	1	**LMP2**	**25**	**(United Kingdom) Ray Mallock Ltd. (RML)**	**(United Kingdom) Mike Newton (Brazil) Thomas Erdos (United Kingdom) Andy Wallace**	**MG-Lola EX264**	MI	**343**
8	1	**LMP2**	**25**	**(United Kingdom) Ray Mallock Ltd. (RML)**	**(United Kingdom) Mike Newton (Brazil) Thomas Erdos (United Kingdom) Andy Wallace**	**AER P07 2.0L Turbo I4**	MI	**343**
9	4	GT1	62	(Russia) Russian Age Racing (United Kingdom) Team Modena	(Spain) Antonio García (Australia) David Brabham (Brazil) Nelson Piquet Jr.	Aston Martin DBR9	MI	343
9	4	GT1	62	(Russia) Russian Age Racing (United Kingdom) Team Modena	(Spain) Antonio García (Australia) David Brabham (Brazil) Nelson Piquet Jr.	Aston Martin 6.0L V12	MI	343
10	5	GT1	009	(United Kingdom) Aston Martin Racing	(Portugal) Pedro Lamy (France) Stéphane Sarrazin (Monaco) Stéphane Ortelli	Aston Martin DBR9	MI	342
10	5	GT1	009	(United Kingdom) Aston Martin Racing	(Portugal) Pedro Lamy (France) Stéphane Sarrazin (Monaco) Stéphane Ortelli	Aston Martin 6.0L V12	MI	342
11	6	GT1	66	(United States) ACEMCO Motorsports	(United Kingdom) Johnny Mowlem (United States) Terry Borcheller (Brazil) Christian Fittipaldi	Saleen S7-R	MI	337
11	6	GT1	66	(United States) ACEMCO Motorsports	(United Kingdom) Johnny Mowlem (United States) Terry Borcheller (Brazil) Christian Fittipaldi	Ford 7.0L V8	MI	337
12	7	GT1	63	(United States) Corvette Racing	(Canada) Ron Fellows (United States) Johnny O'Connell (Italy) Max Papis	Chevrolet Corvette C6.R	MI	327
12	7	GT1	63	(United States) Corvette Racing	(Canada) Ron Fellows (United States) Johnny O'Connell (Italy) Max Papis	Chevrolet LS7R 7.0L V8	MI	327
13	2	LMP2	24	(United States) Binnie Motorsports	(United States) William Binnie (Japan) Yojiro Terada (United Kingdom) Allen Timpany	Lola B05/42	MI	326
13	2	LMP2	24	(United States) Binnie Motorsports	(United States) William Binnie (Japan) Yojiro Terada (United Kingdom) Allen Timpany	Zytek ZG348 3.4L V8	MI	326
14	3	LMP2	27	(United States) Miracle Motorsports	(United States) Andy Lally (United States) John Macaluso (United Kingdom) Ian James	Courage C65	KU	324
14	3	LMP2	27	(United States) Miracle Motorsports	(United States) Andy Lally (United States) John Macaluso (United Kingdom) Ian James	AER P07 2.0L Turbo I4	KU	324
15	1	**GT2**	**81**	**(United Kingdom) Team LNT**	**(United Kingdom) Lawrence Tomlinson (United Kingdom) Tom Kimber-Smith (United Kingdom) Richard Dean**	**Panoz Esperante GT-LM**	P	**321**
15	1	**GT2**	**81**	**(United Kingdom) Team LNT**	**(United Kingdom) Lawrence Tomlinson (United Kingdom) Tom Kimber-Smith (United Kingdom) Richard Dean**	**Ford (Élan) 5.0L V8**	P	**321**
16	2	GT2	83	(Germany) Seikel Motorsport (Germany) Farnbacher Racing	(Denmark) Lars-Erik Nielsen (Germany) Pierre Ehret (Germany) Dominik Farnbacher	Porsche 911 GT3-RS	Y	320
16	2	GT2	83	(Germany) Seikel Motorsport (Germany) Farnbacher Racing	(Denmark) Lars-Erik Nielsen (Germany) Pierre Ehret (Germany) Dominik Farnbacher	Porsche 3.6L Flat-6	Y	320
17	3	GT2	87	(United Kingdom) Scuderia Ecosse	(United Kingdom) Andrew Kirkaldy (Canada) Chris Niarchos (United Kingdom) Tim Mullen	Ferrari F430 GT2	MI	311
17	3	GT2	87	(United Kingdom) Scuderia Ecosse	(United Kingdom) Andrew Kirkaldy (Canada) Chris Niarchos (United Kingdom) Tim Mullen	Ferrari F136 4.0L V8	MI	311
18	4	GT2	80	(United States) Flying Lizard Motorsports	(United States) Johannes van Overbeek (United States) Patrick Long (United States) Seth Neiman	Porsche 911 GT3-RSR	MI	309
18	4	GT2	80	(United States) Flying Lizard Motorsports	(United States) Johannes van Overbeek (United States) Patrick Long (United States) Seth Neiman	Porsche 3.6L Flat-6	MI	309
19	4	LMP2	33	(United States) Intersport Racing	(United States) Clint Field (United States) Liz Halliday (United States) Duncan Dayton	Lola B05/40	G	297
19	4	LMP2	33	(United States) Intersport Racing	(United States) Clint Field (United States) Liz Halliday (United States) Duncan Dayton	AER P07 2.0L Turbo I4	G	297
20	5	LMP2	22	(United Kingdom) Rollcentre Racing	(United Kingdom) Martin Short (Portugal) João Barbosa (United Kingdom) Stuart Moseley	Radical SR9	D	294
20	5	LMP2	22	(United Kingdom) Rollcentre Racing	(United Kingdom) Martin Short (Portugal) João Barbosa (United Kingdom) Stuart Moseley	Judd XV675 3.4L V8	D	294
21	6	LMP2	32	(France) Barazi-Epsilon	(Denmark) Juan Barazi (Netherlands) Michael Vergers (New Zealand) Neil Cunningham	Courage C65	MI	294
21	6	LMP2	32	(France) Barazi-Epsilon	(Denmark) Juan Barazi (Netherlands) Michael Vergers (New Zealand) Neil Cunningham	AER P07 2.0L Turbo I4	MI	294
22	5	GT2	93	(Japan) Team Taisan Advan	(Japan) Kazuyuki Nishizawa (Japan) Shinichi Yamaji (United States) Philip Collin	Porsche 911 GT3-RS	Y	291
22	5	GT2	93	(Japan) Team Taisan Advan	(Japan) Kazuyuki Nishizawa (Japan) Shinichi Yamaji (United States) Philip Collin	Porsche 3.6L Flat-6	Y	291
23	6	GT2	73	(Belgium) Gordon Racing Team (Belgium) Ice Pol Racing Team	(Belgium) Yves-Emmanuel Lambert (Belgium) Christian Lefort (France) Romain Iannetta	Porsche 911 GT3-RSR	D	282
23	6	GT2	73	(Belgium) Gordon Racing Team (Belgium) Ice Pol Racing Team	(Belgium) Yves-Emmanuel Lambert (Belgium) Christian Lefort (France) Romain Iannetta	Porsche 3.8L Flat-6	D	282
24	5	LMP1	2	(United Kingdom) Zytek Engineering (Denmark) Team Essex Invest	(Denmark) John Nielsen (Denmark) Casper Elgaard (Denmark) Philip Andersen	Zytek 06S	MI	269
24	5	LMP1	2	(United Kingdom) Zytek Engineering (Denmark) Team Essex Invest	(Denmark) John Nielsen (Denmark) Casper Elgaard (Denmark) Philip Andersen	Zytek ZB408 4.0L V8	MI	269
25	6	LMP1	19	(United Kingdom) Chamberlain-Synergy Motorsport	(United Kingdom) Bob Berridge (United Kingdom) Gareth Evans (United Kingdom) Peter Owen	Lola B06/10	D	267
25	6	LMP1	19	(United Kingdom) Chamberlain-Synergy Motorsport	(United Kingdom) Bob Berridge (United Kingdom) Gareth Evans (United Kingdom) Peter Owen	AER P32T 3.6L Turbo V8	D	267
26 NC	7	LMP2	20	(France) Pir Competition	(France) Marc Rostan (United Kingdom) Simon Pullan (United States) Chris MacAllister	Pilbeam MP93	MI	244
26 NC	7	LMP2	20	(France) Pir Competition	(France) Marc Rostan (United Kingdom) Simon Pullan (United States) Chris MacAllister	Judd XV675 3.4L V8	MI	244
27 NC	8	GT1	53	(Japan) JLOC Isao Noritake	(Italy) Marco Apicella (Japan) Koji Yamanishi (Japan) Yasutaka Hinoi	Lamborghini Murcielago R-GT	P	283
27 NC	8	GT1	53	(Japan) JLOC Isao Noritake	(Italy) Marco Apicella (Japan) Koji Yamanishi (Japan) Yasutaka Hinoi	Lamborghini L535 6.0L V12	P	283
28 DNF	7	GT2	89	(United Kingdom) Sebah Automotive Ltd.	(Germany) Christian Ried (France) Xavier Pompidou (Denmark) Thorkild Thyrring	Porsche 911 GT3-RSR	D	256
28 DNF	7	GT2	89	(United Kingdom) Sebah Automotive Ltd.	(Germany) Christian Ried (France) Xavier Pompidou (Denmark) Thorkild Thyrring	Porsche 3.6L Flat-6	D	256
29 DNF	7	LMP1	9	(United Kingdom) Creation Autosportif Ltd.	(Switzerland) Felipe Ortiz (Italy) Giuseppe Gabbiani (United Kingdom) Jamie Campbell-Walter	Creation CA06/H	MI	240
29 DNF	7	LMP1	9	(United Kingdom) Creation Autosportif Ltd.	(Switzerland) Felipe Ortiz (Italy) Giuseppe Gabbiani (United Kingdom) Jamie Campbell-Walter	Judd GV5 S2 5.0L V10	MI	240
30 DNF	9	GT1	50	(France) Larbre Compétition	(France) Patrick Bornhauser (France) Jean-Luc Blanchemain (Switzerland) Gabriele Gardel	Ferrari 550-GTS Maranello	MI	222
30 DNF	9	GT1	50	(France) Larbre Compétition	(France) Patrick Bornhauser (France) Jean-Luc Blanchemain (Switzerland) Gabriele Gardel	Ferrari F133 5.9L V12	MI	222
31 DNF	8	GT2	76	(France) IMSA Performance Matmut	(France) Raymond Narac (Italy) Luca Riccitelli (France) Romain Dumas	Porsche 911 GT3-RSR	MI	211
31 DNF	8	GT2	76	(France) IMSA Performance Matmut	(France) Raymond Narac (Italy) Luca Riccitelli (France) Romain Dumas	Porsche 3.8L Flat-6	MI	211
32 DNF	9	GT2	86	(Netherlands) Spyker Squadron b.v.	(Netherlands) Jeroen Bleekemolen (Netherlands) Mike Hezemans (United Kingdom) Jonny Kane	Spyker C8 Spyder GT2-R	MI	202
32 DNF	9	GT2	86	(Netherlands) Spyker Squadron b.v.	(Netherlands) Jeroen Bleekemolen (Netherlands) Mike Hezemans (United Kingdom) Jonny Kane	Audi 3.8L V8	MI	202
33 DNF	10	GT1	67	(Russia) Convers MenX Team	(Russia) Alexey Vasilyev (Czech Republic) Robert Pergl (Netherlands) Peter Kox	Ferrari 550-GTS Maranello	MI	196
33 DNF	10	GT1	67	(Russia) Convers MenX Team	(Russia) Alexey Vasilyev (Czech Republic) Robert Pergl (Netherlands) Peter Kox	Ferrari F133 5.9L V12	MI	196
34 DNF	10	GT2	91	(Japan) T2M Motorsport	(Japan) Yutaka Yamagishi (France) Jean-René de Fournoux (Slovakia) Miro Konôpka	Porsche 911 GT3-RS	D	196
34 DNF	10	GT2	91	(Japan) T2M Motorsport	(Japan) Yutaka Yamagishi (France) Jean-René de Fournoux (Slovakia) Miro Konôpka	Porsche 3.6L Flat-6	D	196
35 DNF	8	LMP2	39	(United Kingdom) Chamberlain-Synergy Motorsport; ASM Team Racing for Portugal	(Portugal) Miguel Amaral (United Kingdom) Warren Hughes (Spain) Miguel Ángel de Castro	Lola B05/40	D	196
35 DNF	8	LMP2	39	(United Kingdom) Chamberlain-Synergy Motorsport; ASM Team Racing for Portugal	(Portugal) Miguel Amaral (United Kingdom) Warren Hughes (Spain) Miguel Ángel de Castro	AER P07 2.0L Turbo I4	D	196
36 DNF	8	LMP1	6	(United Kingdom) Lister Storm Racing	(United Kingdom) Gavin Pickering (Denmark) Nicolas Kiesa (Denmark) Jens Møller	Lister Storm LMP Hybrid	D	192
36 DNF	8	LMP1	6	(United Kingdom) Lister Storm Racing	(United Kingdom) Gavin Pickering (Denmark) Nicolas Kiesa (Denmark) Jens Møller	Chevrolet LS1 6.0L V8	D	192
37 DNF	9	LMP1	14	(Netherlands) Racing for Holland	(Netherlands) Jan Lammers (Malaysia) Alex Yoong (Sweden) Stefan Johansson	Dome S101Hb	D	182
37 DNF	9	LMP1	14	(Netherlands) Racing for Holland	(Netherlands) Jan Lammers (Malaysia) Alex Yoong (Sweden) Stefan Johansson	Judd GV5 5.0L V10	D	182
38 DNF	10	LMP1	12	(France) Courage Compétition	(United Kingdom) Sam Hancock (Switzerland) Alexander Frei (United Kingdom) Gregor Fisken	Courage LC70	Y	171
38 DNF	10	LMP1	12	(France) Courage Compétition	(United Kingdom) Sam Hancock (Switzerland) Alexander Frei (United Kingdom) Gregor Fisken	Mugen MF458S 4.5L V8	Y	171
39 DNF	11	GT2	90	(United States) White Lightning Racing (United States) Krohn Racing	(Germany) Jörg Bergmeister (Sweden) Niclas Jönsson (United States) Tracy Krohn	Porsche 911 GT3-RSR	MI	148
39 DNF	11	GT2	90	(United States) White Lightning Racing (United States) Krohn Racing	(Germany) Jörg Bergmeister (Sweden) Niclas Jönsson (United States) Tracy Krohn	Porsche 3.6L Flat-6	MI	148
40 DNF	9	LMP2	30	(France) Gerard Welter	(France) Patrice Roussel (France) Frédéric Hauchard (France) Julien Briché	WR LMP04	P	134
40 DNF	9	LMP2	30	(France) Gerard Welter	(France) Patrice Roussel (France) Frédéric Hauchard (France) Julien Briché	Peugeot 2.0L Turbo I4	P	134
41 DNF	11	LMP1	5	(Switzerland) Swiss Spirit	(Switzerland) Harold Primat (Switzerland) Marcel Fässler (Austria) Philipp Peter	Courage LC70	MI	132
41 DNF	11	LMP1	5	(Switzerland) Swiss Spirit	(Switzerland) Harold Primat (Switzerland) Marcel Fässler (Austria) Philipp Peter	Judd GV5 S2 5.0L V10	MI	132
42 DNF	11	GT1	61	(Russia) Russian Age Racing (United Kingdom) Cirtek Motorsport	(United Kingdom) Tim Sugden (United Kingdom) Nigel Smith (United Kingdom) Christian Vann	Ferrari 550-GTS Maranello	MI	124
42 DNF	11	GT1	61	(Russia) Russian Age Racing (United Kingdom) Cirtek Motorsport	(United Kingdom) Tim Sugden (United Kingdom) Nigel Smith (United Kingdom) Christian Vann	Ferrari F133 5.9L V12	MI	124
43 DNF	12	GT2	98	(France) Noël del Bello Racing	(United Kingdom) Adam Sharpe (France) Patrick Bourdais (Belgium) Tom Cloet	Porsche 911 GT3-RSR	MI	115
43 DNF	12	GT2	98	(France) Noël del Bello Racing	(United Kingdom) Adam Sharpe (France) Patrick Bourdais (Belgium) Tom Cloet	Porsche 3.6L Flat-6	MI	115
44 DNF	10	LMP2	36	(France) Paul Belmondo Racing	(France) Claude-Yves Gosselin (Saudi Arabia) Karim A. Ojjeh (France) Pierre Ragues	Courage C65	MI	84
44 DNF	10	LMP2	36	(France) Paul Belmondo Racing	(France) Claude-Yves Gosselin (Saudi Arabia) Karim A. Ojjeh (France) Pierre Ragues	Ford (Mecachrome) 3.4L V8	MI	84
45 DNF	11	LMP2	37	(France) Paul Belmondo Racing	(France) Jean-Bernard Bouvet (France) Didier André (France) Yann Clairay	Courage C65	MI	48
45 DNF	11	LMP2	37	(France) Paul Belmondo Racing	(France) Jean-Bernard Bouvet (France) Didier André (France) Yann Clairay	Ford (Mecachrome) 3.4L V8	MI	48
46 DNF	12	LMP2	35	(Belgium) G-Force Racing	(Belgium) Franck Hahn (France) Jean-François Leroch (United Kingdom) Ed Morris	Courage C65	D	47
46 DNF	12	LMP2	35	(Belgium) G-Force Racing	(Belgium) Franck Hahn (France) Jean-François Leroch (United Kingdom) Ed Morris	Judd XV675 3.4L V8	D	47
47 DNF	13	GT2	85	(Netherlands) Spyker Squadron b.v.	(Netherlands) Donny Crevels (United Kingdom) Peter Dumbreck (Netherlands) Tom Coronel	Spyker C8 Spyder GT2-R	MI	40
47 DNF	13	GT2	85	(Netherlands) Spyker Squadron b.v.	(Netherlands) Donny Crevels (United Kingdom) Peter Dumbreck (Netherlands) Tom Coronel	Audi 3.8L V8	MI	40
48 DNF	12	LMP1	13	(France) Courage Compétition	(Japan) Shinji Nakano (France) Jean-Marc Gounon (Japan) Haruki Kurosawa	Courage LC70	Y	35
48 DNF	12	LMP1	13	(France) Courage Compétition	(Japan) Shinji Nakano (France) Jean-Marc Gounon (Japan) Haruki Kurosawa	Mugen MF458S 4.5L V8	Y	35
49 DNF	14	GT2	77	(Canada) Multimatic Motorsport Team Panoz	(United States) Gunnar Jeannette (Canada) Scott Maxwell (United States) Tommy Milner	Panoz Esperante GT-LM	P	34
49 DNF	14	GT2	77	(Canada) Multimatic Motorsport Team Panoz	(United States) Gunnar Jeannette (Canada) Scott Maxwell (United States) Tommy Milner	Ford (Élan) 5.0L V8	P	34
50 DNF	12	GT1	69	(Italy) BMS Scuderia Italia	(Italy) Fabrizio Gollin (Italy) Fabio Babini (Italy) Christian Pescatori	Aston Martin DBR9	P	3
50 DNF	12	GT1	69	(Italy) BMS Scuderia Italia	(Italy) Fabrizio Gollin (Italy) Fabio Babini (Italy) Christian Pescatori	Aston Martin 6.0L V12	P	3

=== Statistics ===
- Fastest Lap - #7 Audi Sport Team Joest - 3:31.211
- Distance - 5187.0 km
- Average Speed - 215.409 km/h
- Highest trap speed - #14 Racing for Holland - 331 km/h (warm-up), #9 Creation Autosportif - 332 km/h (qualifying)
