= Bob Berridge =

British racing driver (born 1956)

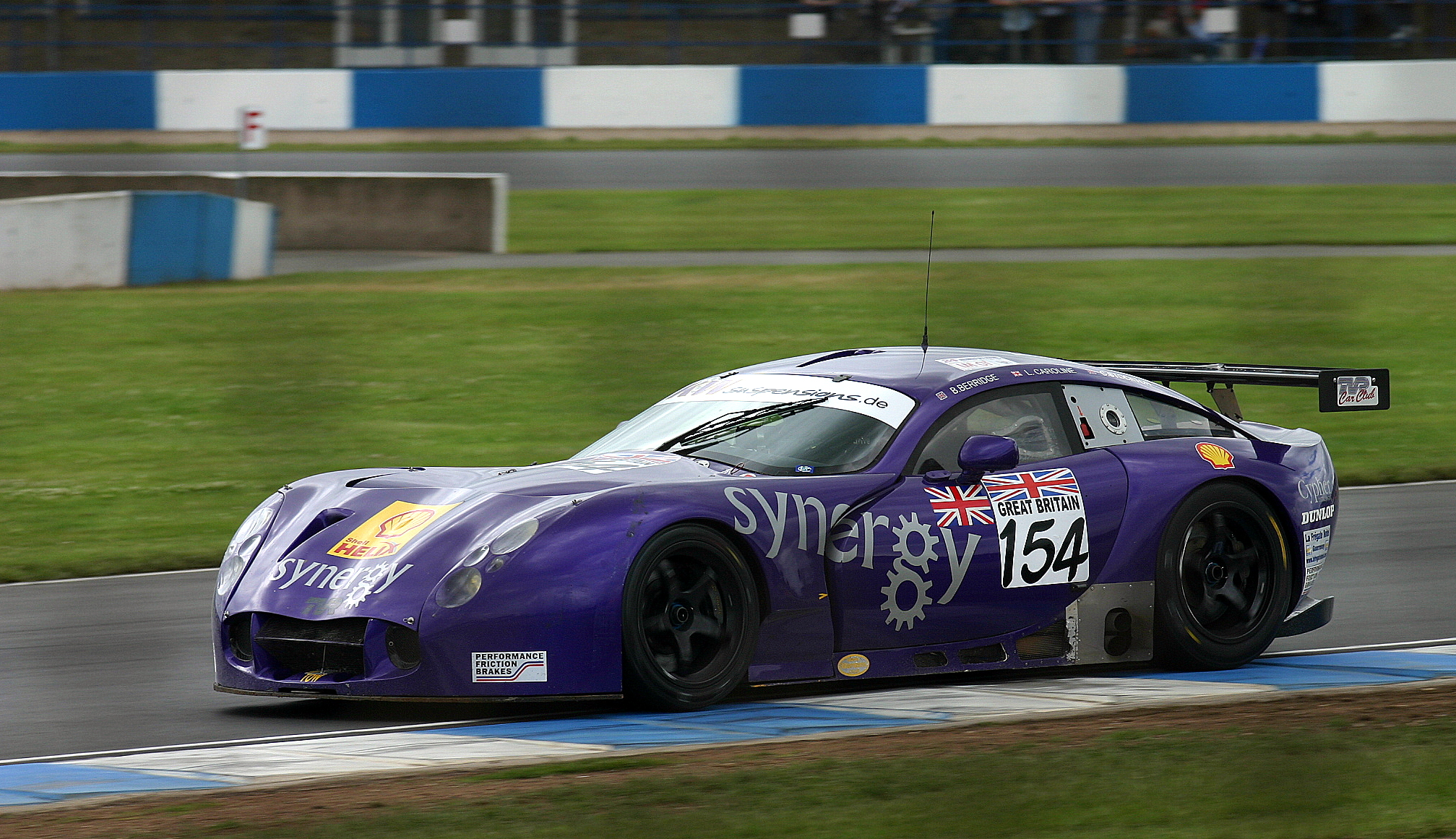
- Berridge in 2004
- Nationality: (United Kingdom) British
- Born: Robert Charles Berridge; 13 September 1956 (age 70) Middlesbrough, United Kingdom

Championship titles
- Formula Ford 1600 (1985, 1986); Porsche Club GB Championship (1990); Historic Formula One Championship (1997, 1998, 1999); Group C Championship (2011); Le Mans Legend (2012)

Robert Charles Berridge (born 13 September 1956 in Middlesbrough) is a British racing driver. He won the title in the Historic Formula One Championship series three years in a row. In 1997, he won in a RAM 01 car and the next two years he won in a Williams FW08. He had previously competed in rounds of the British Touring Car Championship and British Formula Three Championship.

Berridge is the founder and CEO of BBM Sport, which runs Peugeot LMP1 cars in historic racing.

== Career ==
Berridge won two Formula Ford 1600 titles in 1985 and 1986 was second in the Toyota Formula Three Championship in 1987. He later won the Porsche Club GB Championship in 1990. He won in the Historic Formula One Championship series three years in a row 1997, 1998, and 1999. In 1997, he won the title in a RAM 01 car, and then took the title the following two years he won in a Williams FW08.

Berridge raced in the Le Mans Series from 2004 until 2008 and entered five Le Mans 24 Hour races. He also ran and drove for Chamberlain Synergy that won the LMS drivers and Team Championship in LMP2 in 2005 and finished third in the Team Championship in LMP1 in 2006. Berridge won the inaugural Group C Championship in 2011 in a Mercedes Benz C11. He has also previously competed in rounds of the British Touring Car Championship Driving for Vauxhall with a self prepared Ford Cosworth Saphire, and British Formula Three Championship in the abortive Vision project in 1988. He has won over 200 races.

In 2017, Berridge co-founded BBM Sport, a race car restoration and engineering company, with Steve Briggs and former Peugeot factory driver Nicolas Minassian. The team, based out of a 35,000 sq ft (3,300 m^{2}) workshop in Daventry, England, is best known for operating Peugeot 908 HDi FAP, Peugeot 908, BR Engineering BR01 and Lola B08/80 prototypes in historic racing. In late 2025, BBM Sport purchased several Peugeot 9X8 and announced intentions to join the new Hypercar class of the Asian Le Mans Series.

== Racing record ==
=== Complete British Touring Car Championship results ===
(key) (Races in bold indicate pole position – 1990 in class) (Races in italics indicate fastest lap)

Year	Team	Car	Class	1	2	3	4	5	6	7	8	9	10	11	12	13	14	15	16	17	DC	Pts	Class
1990	Vauxhall Motorsport	Vauxhall Cavalier	B	OUL	DON	THR	SIL	OUL	SIL	BRH; Ret‡	SNE	BRH	BIR	DON; Ret	THR	SIL					NC	0	NC
1991	Vauxhall Motorsport	Vauxhall Cavalier		SIL	SNE	DON	THR	SIL	BRH	SIL	DON; 1	DON; 2	OUL	BRH; 1	BRH; 2	DON	THR; Ret	SIL; 16			NC	0	
1993	Bob Berridge	Ford Sierra Sapphire		SIL	DON	SNE	DON	OUL	BRH; 1 Ret	BRH; 2 DNS	PEM	SIL; Ret	KNO; 1	KNO; 2	OUL; Ret	BRH; DSQ	THR; Ret	DON; 1; 18	DON; 2 Ret	SIL; 20	NC	0	

‡ Endurance driver (Ineligible for points)

=== 24 Hours of Le Mans results ===
Year	Team	Co-Drivers	Car	Class	Laps	Pos.	Class Pos.
2004	(United Kingdom) Chamberlain-Synergy Motorsport	(United Kingdom) Michael Caine (United Kingdom) Chris Stockton	TVR Tuscan T400R	GT	300	21st	8th
2005	(United Kingdom) Chamberlain-Synergy Motorsport	(United Kingdom) Gareth Evans (United Kingdom) Peter Owen	Lola B05/40-AER	LMP2	30	DNF	DNF
2006	(United Kingdom) Chamberlain-Synergy Motorsport	(United Kingdom) Gareth Evans (United Kingdom) Peter Owen	Lola B06/10-AER	LMP1	267	NC	NC
2007	(United Kingdom) Chamberlain-Synergy Motorsport	(United Kingdom) Gareth Evans (United Kingdom) Peter Owen	Lola B06/10-AER	LMP1	310	20th	7th
2008	(United Kingdom) Chamberlain-Synergy Motorsport	(United Kingdom) Gareth Evans (United Kingdom) Amanda Stretton	Lola B06/10-AER	LMP1	87	DNF	DNF
