= Gareth Evans (racing driver) =

British racing driver (born 1959)

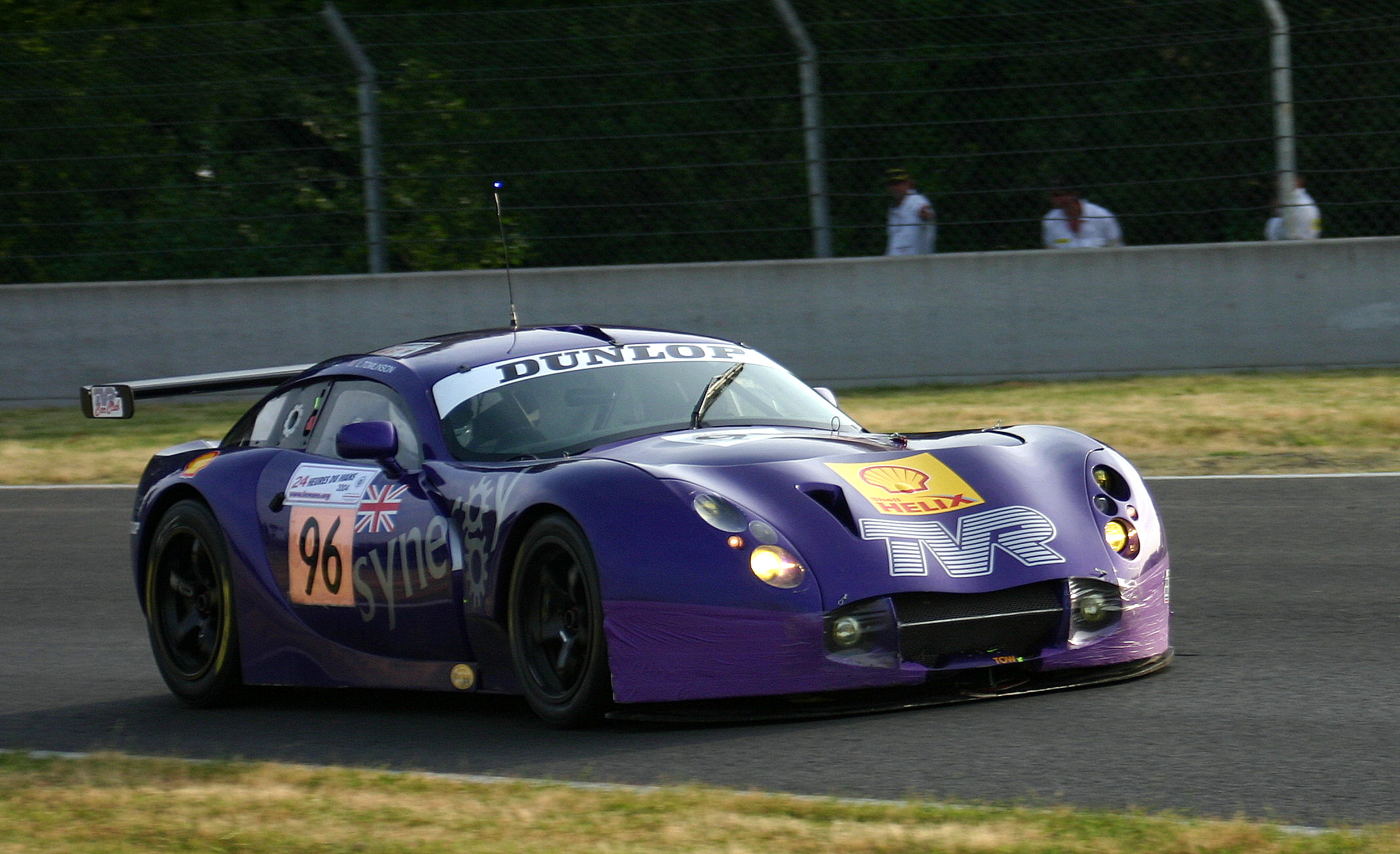
- Evans in 2011
- Nationality: (United Kingdom) British
- Born: March 26, 1959 (age 67) London, U.K.

Le Mans Series career
- Years active: 2005–2008
- Teams: Chamberlain-Synergy Motorsport
- Starts: 16
- Wins: 6
- Podiums: 4
- Poles: 0
- Fastest laps: 0
- Best finish: 1st in 2005

Previous series
- 2004 2003: American Le Mans Series; British GT Championship

Championship titles
- 2005: Le Mans Endurance Series – LMP2

Gareth Evans (born March 26, 1959) is a British former racing driver who last competed in the 24 Hours of Le Mans for Chamberlain-Synergy Motorsport.

In 2005, Evans won the LMP2 class in the Le Mans Endurance Series whilst driving for Chamberlain-Synergy Motorsport.

== Racing record ==
=== Career summary ===
Season	Series	Team	Races	Wins	Poles	F/Laps	Podiums	Points	Position
2003	British GT Championship – GTO	CDL Racing	10	0	0	0	1	?	?
2004	American Le Mans Series – GT	Chamberlain-Synergy Motorsport	1	0	0	0	0	0	NC
2004	24 Hours of Le Mans – GT	Chamberlain-Synergy Motorsport	1	0	0	0	0	N/A	9th
2005	Le Mans Endurance Series – LMP2	Chamberlain-Synergy Motorsport	5	1	0	0	3	34	**1st**
2005	24 Hours of Le Mans – LMP2	Chamberlain-Synergy Motorsport	1	0	0	0	0	N/A	DNF
2006	Le Mans Series – LMP1	Chamberlain-Synergy Motorsport	5	0	0	0	1	20	4th
2006	24 Hours of Le Mans – LMP1	Chamberlain-Synergy Motorsport	1	0	0	0	0	N/A	6th
2007	Le Mans Series – LMP1	Chamberlain-Synergy Motorsport	5	0	0	0	0	6	14th
2007	24 Hours of Le Mans – LMP1	Chamberlain-Synergy Motorsport	1	0	0	0	0	N/A	7th
2008	Le Mans Series – LMP1	Chamberlain-Synergy Motorsport	1	0	0	0	0	0	NC
2008	24 Hours of Le Mans – LMP1	Chamberlain-Synergy Motorsport	1	0	0	0	0	N/A	DNF

=== Complete American Le Mans Series results ===
(key) (Races in bold indicate pole position; races in italics indicate fastest lap.)

Year	Entrant	Class	Chassis	Engine	1	2	3	4	5	6	7	8	9	Rank	Points	Ref
2004	Chamberlain-Synergy Motorsport	GT	TVR Tuscan T400R	TVR Speed Six 4.0 L I6	SEB; 12	MDO	LIM	SON	POR	MOS	ELK	PET	LGA	NC	0	

=== Complete 24 Hours of Le Mans results ===
Year	Team	Co-Drivers	Car	Class	Laps	Pos.	Class Pos.
2004	(United Kingdom) Chamberlain-Synergy Motorsport	(United Kingdom) Nigel Greensall (United Kingdom) Lawrence Tomlinson	TVR Tuscan T400R	GT	291	22nd	9th
2005	(United Kingdom) Chamberlain-Synergy Motorsport	(United Kingdom) Bob Berridge (United Kingdom) Peter Owen	Lola B05/40-AER	LMP2	30	DNF	DNF
2006	(United Kingdom) Chamberlain-Synergy Motorsport	(United Kingdom) Bob Berridge (United Kingdom) Peter Owen	Lola B06/10-AER	LMP1	267	25th	6th
2007	(United Kingdom) Chamberlain-Synergy Motorsport	(United Kingdom) Bob Berridge (United Kingdom) Peter Owen	Lola B06/10-AER	LMP1	310	20th	7th
2008	(United Kingdom) Chamberlain-Synergy Motorsport	(United Kingdom) Bob Berridge (United Kingdom) Amanda Stretton	Lola B06/10-AER	LMP1	87	DNF	DNF

=== Complete Le Mans Series results ===
(key) (Races in bold indicate pole position; races in italics indicate fastest lap.)

Year	Entrant	Class	Chassis	Engine	1	2	3	4	5	6	Rank	Points
2005	Chamberlain-Synergy Motorsport	LMP2	Lola B05/40	AER P07 2.0 L Turbo I4	SPA; 1	MNZ; 2	SIL; 5	NÜR; 5	IST; 2		1st	34
2006	Chamberlain-Synergy Motorsport	LMP1	Lola B06/10	AER P32T 3.6 L Turbo V8	IST; 3	SPA; Ret	NÜR; 4	DON; 5	JAR; 4		4th	20
2007	Chamberlain-Synergy Motorsport	LMP1	Lola B06/10	AER P32T 3.6 L Turbo V8	MON; Ret	VAL; 7	NÜR; 10	SPA; 5	SIL; Ret	INT	14th	6
2008	Chamberlain-Synergy Motorsport	LMP1	Lola B06/10	AER P32C 4.0 L Turbo V8	CAT; 9	MON	SPA	NÜR	SIL		NC	0
