= Lister Storm LMP =

Lister Storm LMP/Hybrid
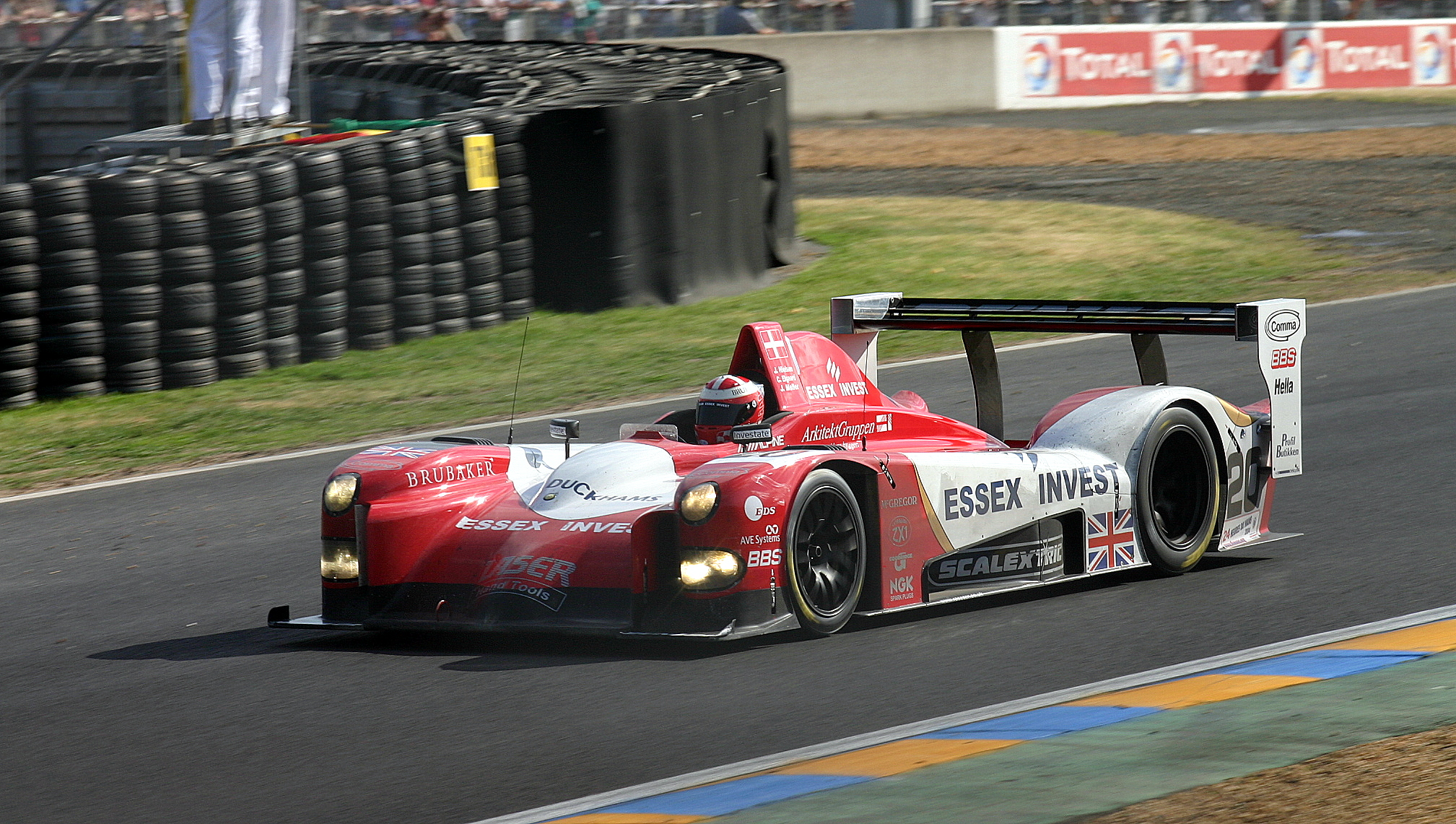
- Category: LMP900 & LMP1
- Constructor: Lister Cars
- Designer: Andy Thorby

Technical specifications
- Chassis: Carbon fiber and aluminium honeycomb monocoque, carbon roll hoop integrated with roof structure
- Suspension (front): double wishbones, pull-rod operated Eibach springs over Penske dampers
- Suspension (rear): double wishbones, pull-rod operated Eibach springs over Penske dampers
- Engine: Chevrolet 6.0 liter 90-degree V8 naturally aspirated, mid-engine, longitudinally mounted
- Transmission: Hewland 6-speed sequential manual
- Tyres: Dunlop

Competition history
- Notable entrants: Lister Racing
- Notable drivers: John Nielsen, Casper Elgaard, Jens Reno Møller, Jamie Campbell-Walter, Nathan Kinch; Vincent Vosse
- Debut: 2003 12 Hours of Sebring
Races	Wins	Poles	F/Laps
14	1	0	0
- Constructors' Championships: None
- Drivers' Championships: None

The Lister Storm LMP is a racing car built by Lister Cars and designed by Andy Thorby. Using knowledge gained with campaigning the Storm GT in various championships, Lister built the Storm LMP, an open-topped Le Mans Prototype. While the GT car is powered by the Jaguar V12 engine, the prototype was originally intended to be fitted with a Judd V10 powerplant but was built with a Chevrolet V8. The car uses a Hewland TLS 6-speed sequential gearbox with a Megaline paddle-shift system.

The Storm LMP's performances were only lackluster, due to Lister's limited resources as a factory effort. When financial backer Essex Invest pulled out of the project, moving to adversary Zytek, the team moved its attention more to its successful GT car programme. The LMP appeared sporadically following this, its best result being victory in the 2004 Vallelunga 6 Hours.

The Storm LMP was converted to a hybrid car in mid-2005 and made its debut at the wet Silverstone round of the Le Mans Endurance Series where it finished 18th in the hands of Justin Keen and Jens Reno Møller. The car's only other appearance following its conversion was in the Vallelunga 6 Hours, where it was classified second despite suffering suspension failure late in the race.

2006 saw an entry for the full Le Mans Series season and a creditable run to second in class at the shortened Istanbul 1000km (seven laps behind the winning Pescarolo). A crash at the Spa and a troubled run at Le Mans were less promising. While at Le Mans it was announced that Lister would cease development of the Storm LMP and instead concentrate on a new GT1 car, this was overtaken by events later in the year. Despite this, the team skipped the Nürburgring race to introduce further developments, which were revealed at the Donington race. Again the Lister suffered a difficult race, retiring after 56 laps. As matters transpired, Donington proved to be the LMP's final outing.

For 2007 and beyond Lister planned to design and build a car around a new Pescarolo Sport 01 chassis, while replacing the Chevrolet based engine with a new Judd V10 powerplant. Lister would have their own separate aerodynamic development programme led by Peter Elleray. Despite being based on the Pescarolo, the car was to be badged as a Lister-Judd. However, after initially being delayed, the project was eventually cancelled due to a lack of funds.
