= Chamberlain Engineering =

UK automotive engine builder and auto racing team

(United Kingdom) Chamberlain Engineering
- Founded: 1972
- Founder(s): Hugh Chamberlain
- Base: Buntingford, Hertfordshire, United Kingdom
- Former series: Clubmans; Thundersports; World Sportscar Championship; BRDC Sportscar Championship; Supercup; British GT Championship; British Formula 3000; BPR Global GT Series; FIA GT Championship; Spanish GT Championship; American Le Mans Series; European Le Mans Series
- Teams' Championships: 1989 (World Sportscar); 1992 FIA Cup; 2005 (European Le Mans)
- Drivers' Championships: 1989 (World Sportscar); 1992 FIA Cup; 2005 (European Le Mans)

Chamberlain Engineering was an automotive engine builder turned auto racing team founded by racing driver Hugh Chamberlain in 1972. The team moved through the British national sports car championships before becoming a competitor in the World Sportscar Championship, eventually winning world titles in 1989 and 1992. Chamberlain went on to develop sports cars for Jaguar and Lotus in the 1990s before becoming a customer of the Chrysler Viper GTS-R program in the FIA GT Championship; the team later led MG's return to Le Mans in 2001. Chamberlain later merged with Gareth Evans to form Chamberlain-Synergy Motorsport to campaign TVRs in 2004 before moving to the European Le Mans Series where they won another championship in 2005. Chamberlain-Synergy left active motorsports in 2008, although Hugh Chamberlain continues to work as a manager and consultant with other teams in sports car racing.

== History ==
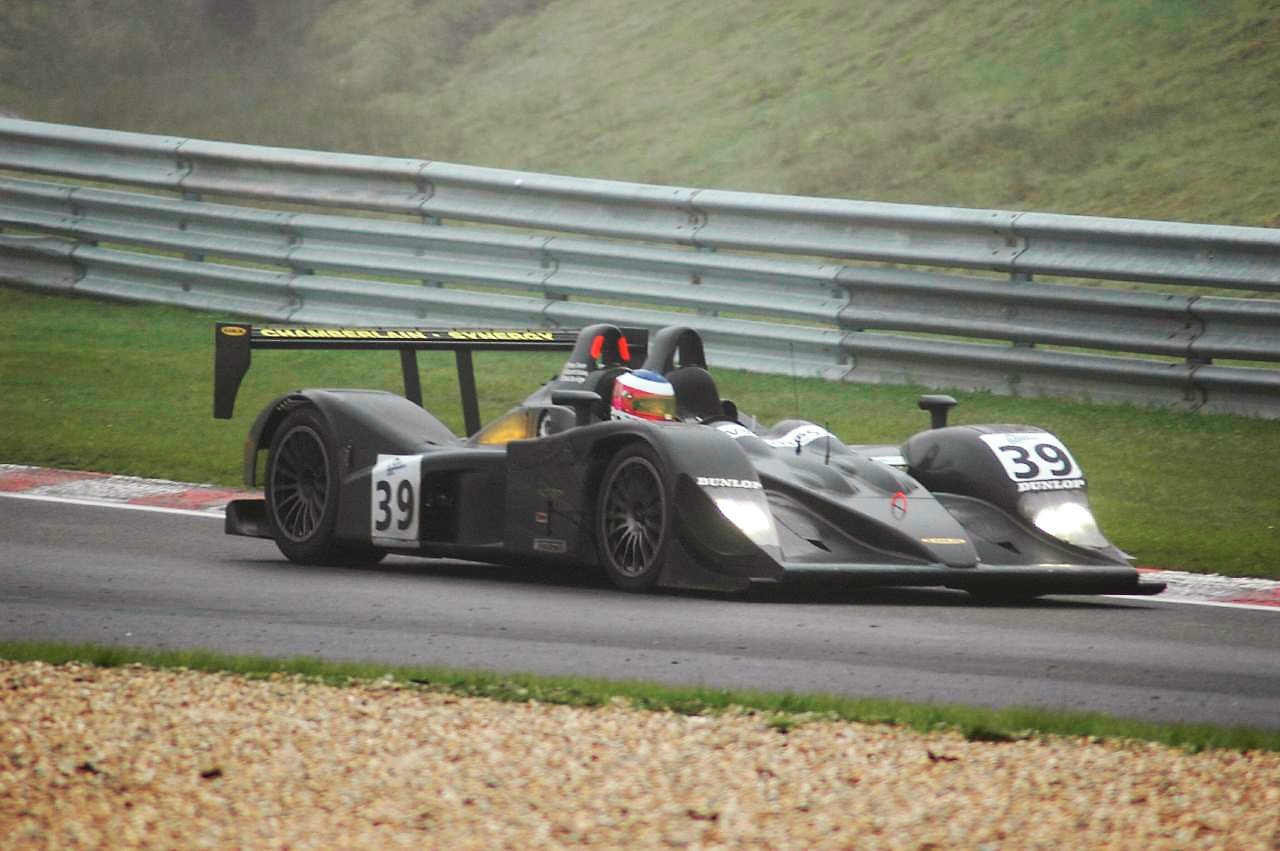
Chamberlain-Synergy's championship-winning Lola-AER in 2005

Chamberlain raced on the amateur level in the 1960s before entering the Clubman series in 1968. Developing engines for his own Mallock U2 sports cars led to the formation of Chamberlain Engineering to build and sell engines for road and race cars as well as fund his own entries in Clubmans; the company later moved into their permanent race shop in Buntingford in 1978. After teaming with Will Hoy in 1982 the pair led the Clubmans series for three years before signing Creighton Brown, purchasing a Tiga sports car and Hart turbocharged engine to move into the Thundersports series, although the engine suffered reliability issues throughout the season. Once sorting the Hart's issues for 1986 Chamberlain gathered the funding to move to an international series, entering the C2 category of the World Sports-Prototype Championship with the best result of seventh in class at Spa. The team purchased a new chassis from the defending C2 world champions Spice Engineering for 1987 and Nick Adams became the team's lead driver after the departure of Hoy. Although not a successful championship bid, Adams and Graham Duxbury won their class at the non-championship Kyalami event. Owner-driver Jean-Louis Ricci also added his own Spice to Chamberlain's team in the latter half of 1987 and continued the partnership into 1988. Although winless, the two Spices were consistent finishers and the team was runners-up in the C2 teams' championship behind Spice Engineering, while Ricci and co-driver Claude Ballot-Léna were sixth in the drivers' standings.

In 1989, Spice moved to the upper class of the championship and Chamberlain switched from their turbocharged Hart motor to the more dominant Ford Cosworth V8. Nick Adams, partnered with Fermín Vélez and sponsored by Repsol, won the first four races of the season. Their control of the category was enough that the team skipped the final race of the season, entering their Spice-Ford in the upper class of the championship instead, yet still winning the teams and drivers' championships in the C2 category. The lower class became defunct in 1990, moving Chamberlain into a class now led by manufacturer teams from Mercedes-Benz, Jaguar, Toyota, Nissan, and Porsche, as well as returning to competing against the factory Spice team. A variety of drivers rotated through the team's two cars, although Vélez later moved to the Spice team and the season ended with Chamberlain not scoring any championship points. New regulations coming into effect for the series left Chamberlain to enter only select races in 1991 before a return to a full-season effort in 1992, once more in the newly established FIA Cup category. Chamberlain Engineering won the 1992 FIA Cup for Teams and Ferdinand de Lesseps, the only driver in the FIA Cup category to compete in all six races that season, handily won the drivers' title.

The World Championship folded after the 1992 season and Chamberlain began a slew of GT programs in the 1990s. A partnership with Lotus Sport came in 1993, codeveloping Lotus Esprits for competition. Although intended for Le Mans, Chamberlain returned to their British racing roots by competing in the newly founded BRDC National Sports GT Challenge in 1994, winning their class title with Thorkild Thyrring, as well as entering some other international events on the BPR Global GT Series. As Lotus took full control of the project in 1995, Chamberlain began various projects with British teams, developing a Jaguar XJ220 and running a Porsche 911 GT2. The team eventually became involved in Chrysler's new GT program as the first customers of the Viper GTS-Rs, entering a two-car team in the FIA GT Championship. By 1999 Chamberlain had moved up to second in the championship behind the factory-backed Oreca team. Chamberlain Engineering returned to prototype racing in 2001 at the behest of MG for a two-year campaign of their new cars at the 24 Hours of Le Mans. Although ultimately unsuccessful, the team later purchased a Dome-Judd chassis for use in the American Le Mans Series at the end of 2002.

Chamberlain once again became sporting partners with another British entry, Gareth Evan's TVR Tuscans from the British GT Championship. The new Chamberlain-Synergy team campaigned the cars internationally in 2004 at select events including the American Le Mans Series, Le Mans Series, FIA GT Championship, and at the 24 Hours of Le Mans. Gareth Evans then made the transition to prototypes with a new Lola-AER chassis and won the LMP2 championship for the Le Mans Series. The partnership between Chamberlain and Evans continued through to 2008 when the team made their last start at Le Mans. Hugh Chamberlain would later continue to serve as a consultant and sporting director for British teams.

Hugh Chamberlain died on 25 February 2024, at the age of 82.
