= Lola B06/10 =

Le Mans Prototype sports car

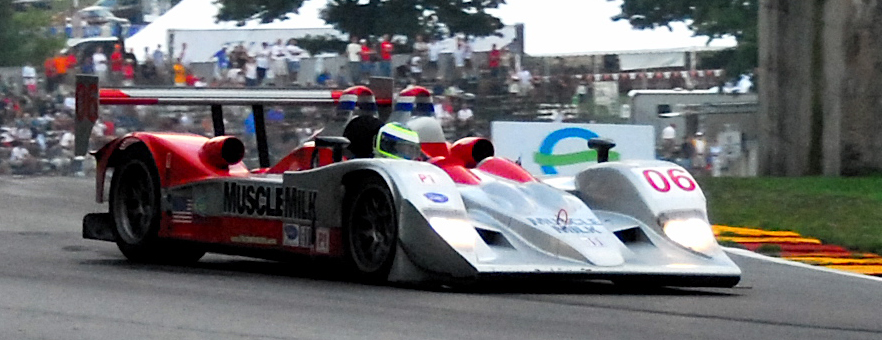
Team Cytosport's Lola B06/10 at the 2007 Generac 500.

The Lola B06/10 is a Le Mans Prototype developed by Lola Cars International for use in the LMP1 class of the American Le Mans Series, Le Mans Series, and 24 Hours of Le Mans. It was developed in 2006 as a replacement for the Lola B2K/10 as well as the MG-Lola EX257. It shared much of its mechanical elements and design with the LMP2 class Lola B05/40, which was developed the year prior.

== Development ==
Due to similarity in the new regulations between LMP1 and LMP2, Lola was able to easily develop an all new LMP1 car based on their existing and successful B05/40 LMP2. Sharing most of the design elements evolved from the MG-Lola EX257, the B06/10 would bring them to a larger scale meant for larger engines than the LMP2 class allowed. This would include increased cooling and air management, as well as the ability to carry much larger engines as well as turbochargers.

Although the nose of the B06/10 is nearly identical to the B05/40, among the most noticeable differences is the use of larger brake ducts between the fenders and raised nose than those seen on the B05/40. Instead of NACA ducts, large squared off openings would be used to collect more air, even if it increased drag. The sides of the car would also include larger openings for the radiators, while extra vents were used to draw away heat and unnecessary air. Unlike the B05/40 though, inlets for the turbochargers would be moved from their position next to the cockpit, to a new position integrated into the rear wheel fenders, partially because two intakes were necessary on the B06/10 while only a single was needed on the B05/40.

For engines, the B06/10 was specifically designed around the use of either the Advanced Engine Research (AER) P32T twin-turbocharged 3.6 Litre V8 or the Judd GV5 naturally aspirated 5.0 Litre V10. While the GV5 has yet to be used, an upgraded GV5.5 S2 5.5 Litre V10 was put into use by Charouz Racing Systems in 2007. Swiss Spirit have also installed an Audi twin-turbocharged 3.6 Litre V8 for the 2007 season, with assistance from Audi Sport.

=== Modifications ===
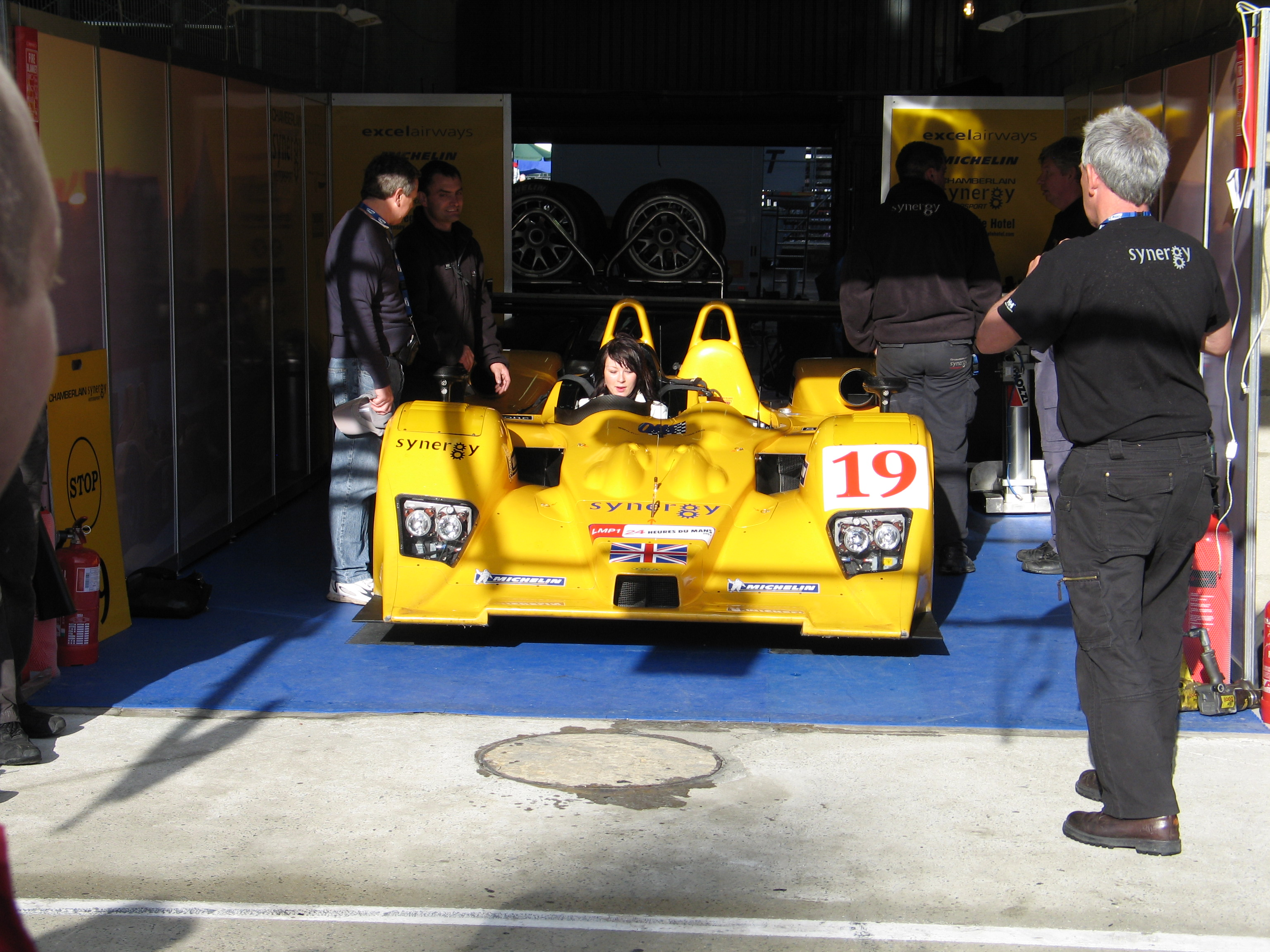
The Chamberlain-Synergy Motorsport B06/10 at the 2007 24 Hours of Le Mans, showing the 2007-spec aerodynamic upgrades to the nose.

Like the B05/40, the B06/10 has been continually upgraded by Lola. For 2007 aerodynamic improvements nearly identical to those seen on the B05/40, which included the replacement of the two large ducts between the fenders with a large single duct in a slightly raised nose. This has led to some of the cars to be named B07/10, while the older cars tend to keep the B06/10 name. Some modification to the design of the B06/10 was necessary for Swiss Spirit's Audi V8 to be able to be used, although it was minor.

== Racing history ==
In 2006, three B06/10s would be sold to two teams. Dyson Racing would run two cars in the American Le Mans Series while Chamberlain-Synergy would run a single entry in the Le Mans Series, as well as at the 24 Hours of Le Mans. Dyson's AER-powered cars would struggle in the ALMS, taking no wins yet finishing second to the dominant Audi R10. Chamberlain-Synergy would see similar results, tying for second in the Le Mans Series with no wins as well, beaten by the dominant Pescarolo Sport team. In 2007, Dyson sold their two B06/10s, with one being bought by Team Cytosport for select rounds of the ALMS, while the second was originally sold to Velocity Motorsports. Intersport Racing bought the car from Velocity to use for the final two races of the ALMS season. Chamberlain-Synergy on the other hand retained their car, and were joined by the Charouz Racing Systems Judd-powered entry and Swiss Spirit's Audi-powered car for the Le Mans Series and 24 Hours of Le Mans.

In 2008, the use of the B06/10 greatly declined. Swiss Spirit folded after the 2007 Le Mans Series season. Charouz moved to the Lola B08/80 for the whole of the 2008 Le Mans Series season and only using their B06/10 at the 24 Hours At Le Mans. Chamberlain-Synergy continued to race their Lola in the Le Mans Series, but they scored no points. They later sold their car to an American Team, Autocon Motorsports. In America, Intersport Racing continued to race their B06/10's to one class victory due to the disqualification of an Audi R10. Before the 2008 Petit Le Mans, they purchased the Charouz chassis, but the chassis was written off during a late race crash.

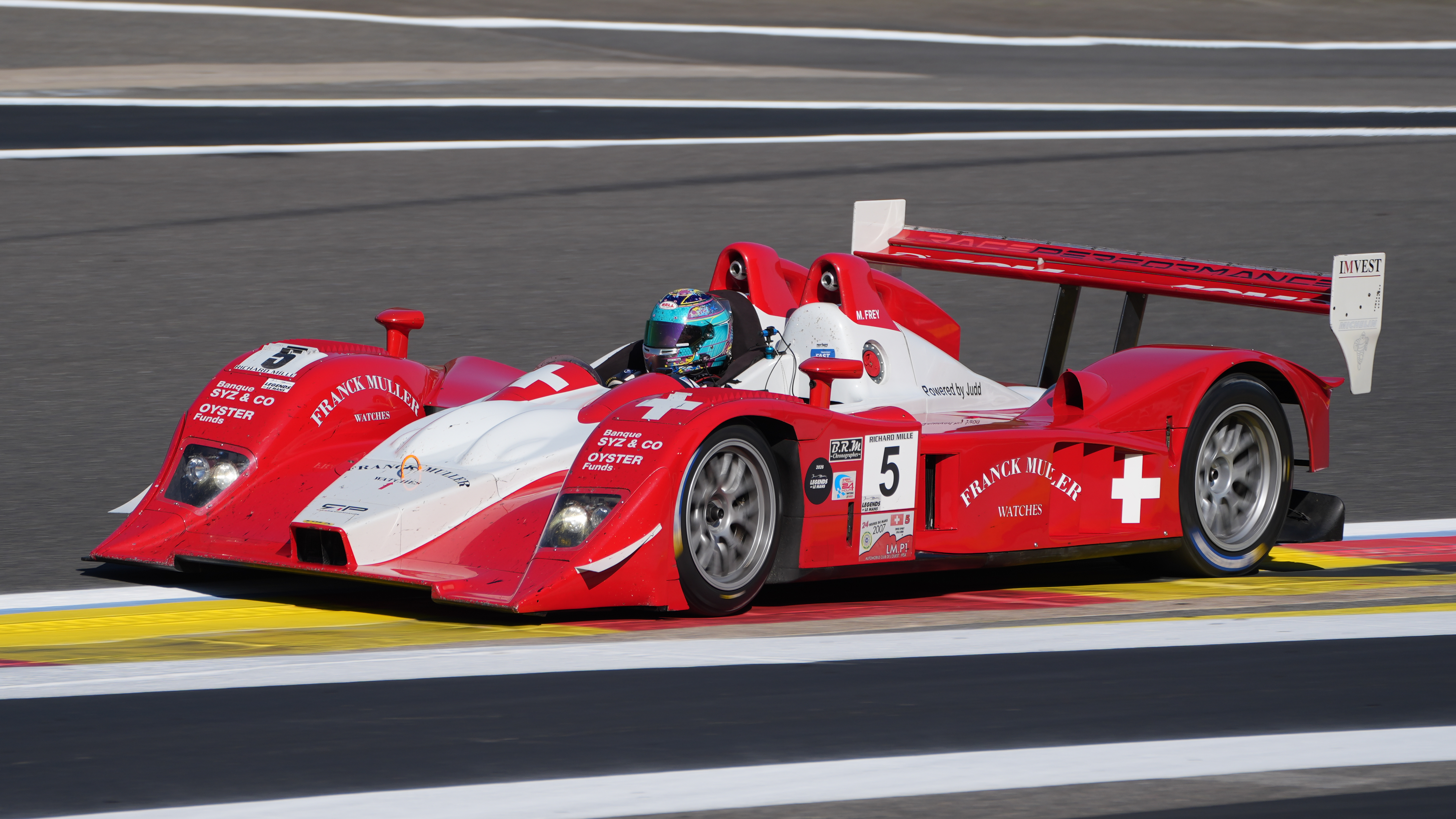
Michael Frey driving the No. 5 B07/18 during the 2026 Legends of Le Mans Series round at Spa-Francorchamps

In 2009, only Autocon Motorsports and Intersport Racing use the B06/10s. Autocon continued to use the Chamberlain-Synergy chassis from last year. Intersport converted an old Lola B05/40 chassis into a B06/10 chassis in order to race in the 2009 American Le Mans Series season.

In 2011, Autocon Motorsports resurrected the B06/10 to race in the 2011 American Le Mans Series season. However, the team only participated in a partial season and the car almost always ran last in the LMP1 category unless one of the other teams ran into mechanical problems.
