= 2006 Le Mans Series =

3rd season of sports car racing series

Seasons
- ← 2005 2007 →

The 2006 Le Mans Series was the third season of ACO Le Mans Series. It is a series for Le Mans prototype and Grand Touring style cars broken into 4 classes: LMP1, LMP2, GT1, and GT2. It began on 9 April and ended on 24 September after 5 rounds.

== Schedule ==
Rnd	Race	Circuit	Date
-	(France) LMS Official Test	Paul Ricard HTTT	26 March, 27 March
1	(Turkey) 1000 km of Istanbul^{†}	Istanbul Racing Circuit	9 April
2	(Belgium) 1000 km of Spa	Circuit de Spa-Francorchamps	14 May
3	(Germany) 1000 km of Nürburgring	Nürburgring	16 July
4	(United Kingdom) 1000 km of Donington	Donington Park	27 August
5	(Spain) 1000 km of Jarama^{‡}	Circuito Permanente Del Jarama	24 September

† - The race in Istanbul was shortened from its original planned 1000 km to a limit of 4 hours due to a lack of fuel brought to the event by organizers.

‡ - This event was originally planned to be held at Monza, but had to be cancelled due to conflicts. Jarama was announced as its replacement.

== Season results ==
Overall winner in bold.

Rnd	Circuit	LMP1 Winning Team	LMP2 Winning Team	GT1 Winning Team	GT2 Winning Team	Results
Rnd	Circuit	LMP1 Winning Drivers	LMP2 Winning Drivers	GT1 Winning Drivers	GT2 Winning Drivers	Results
1	Istanbul	(France) **#17 Pescarolo Sport**	(France) #32 Barazi-Epsilon	(France) #50 Aston Martin Larbre	(Italy) #97 GPC Sport	Results
1	Istanbul	**(France) Emmanuel Collard** **(France) Jean-Christophe Boullion**	(Netherlands) Michael Vergers (Denmark) Juan Barazi (France) Jean-Philippe Belloc	(Portugal) Pedro Lamy (Switzerland) Gabriele Gardel (Belgium) Vincent Vosse	(Italy) Luca Drudi (Italy) Gabrio Rosa (Italy) Fabrizio de Simone	Results
2	Spa	(France) **#17 Pescarolo Sport**	(United Kingdom) #39 Chamberlain-Synergy	(France) #55 Team Oreca	(Italy) #76 Autorlando Sport	Results
2	Spa	**(France) Emmanuel Collard** **(France) Jean-Christophe Boullion**	(Portugal) Miguel Amaral (Spain) Miguel Ángel de Castro (Spain) Angel Burgueño	(Monaco) Stéphane Ortelli (France) Soheil Ayari	(Germany) Marc Lieb (Switzerland) Joël Camathias	Results
3	Nürburgring	(France) **#17 Pescarolo Sport**	(Portugal) #40 ASM Team	(France) #50 Aston Martin Larbre	(Italy) #83 GPC Sport	Results
3	Nürburgring	**(France) Emmanuel Collard** **(France) Jean-Christophe Boullion** **(France) Éric Hélary**	(Portugal) Miguel Amaral (Spain) Miguel Ángel de Castro (Spain) Angel Burgueño	(Portugal) Pedro Lamy (Switzerland) Gabriele Gardel (Belgium) Vincent Vosse	(Italy) Stefano Zonca (Italy) Andrea Belicchi (Italy) Marco Cioci	Results
4	Donington	**(France) #17 Pescarolo Sport**	(United Kingdom) #25 RML	(United Kingdom) #63 Team Modena	(United Kingdom) #81 Team LNT	Results
4	Donington	**(France) Emmanuel Collard** **(France) Jean-Christophe Boullion** **(France) Didier André**	(Brazil) Thomas Erdos (United Kingdom) Mike Newton	(Spain) Antonio García (United Kingdom) Peter Hardman	(United Kingdom) Warren Hughes (United Kingdom) Robert Bell	Results
5	Jarama	**(France) #17 Pescarolo Sport**	(Portugal) #40 ASM Team	(France) #55 Team Oreca	(United Kingdom) #81 Team LNT	Results
5	Jarama	**(France) Emmanuel Collard** **(France) Jean-Christophe Boullion** **(France) Didier André**	(Portugal) Miguel Amaral (Spain) Miguel Ángel de Castro (Spain) Angel Burgueño	(Monaco) Stéphane Ortelli (France) Soheil Ayari	(United Kingdom) Robert Bell (United Kingdom) Warren Hughes	Results

== Teams Championships ==
Points are awarded to the top 8 finishers in the order of 10-8-6-5-4-3-2-1. Teams with multiple entries do not have their cars combined, each entry number is scored separately in the championship. Cars failing to complete 70% of the winner's distance are not awarded points.

The top 2 finishers in each teams championship earn automatic entry to the following year's 24 Hours of Le Mans

=== LMP1 Standings ===
Pos	No	Team	Chassis	Engine	IST (Turkey)	SPA (Belgium)	NÜR (Germany)	DON (United Kingdom)	JAR (Spain)	Total
1	#17	(France) Pescarolo Sport	Pescarolo C60 Hybrid	Judd GV5 5.0 L V10	1	1	1	1	1	50
2=^{†}	#9	(United Kingdom) Creation Autosportif	Creation CA06/H	Judd GV5 5.0 L V10	Ret		2	3	3	20
2=	#19	(United Kingdom) Chamberlain-Synergy Motorsport	Lola B06/10	AER P32T 3.6 L Turbo V8	3	Ret	4	5	4	20
4	#5	(Switzerland) Swiss Spirit	Courage LC70	Judd GV5 5.0 L V10	Ret	2	6	Ret	2	19
5	#2	(United Kingdom) Zytek Engineering	Zytek 06S	Zytek 2ZG408 4.0 L V8		3	5	Ret		10
6=	#6	(United Kingdom) Lister Storm Racing	Lister Storm LMP	Chevrolet LS1 6.0 L V8	2	Ret		Ret		8
6=	#10	(United Kingdom) Creation Autosportif	Creation CA06/H	Judd GV5 5.0 L V10				2		8
8	#12	(France) Courage Compétition	Courage LC70	Mugen MF458S 4.5 L V8		NC	7	4	Ret	7
9	#14	(Netherlands) Racing for Holland	Dome S101Hb	Mugen MF408S 4.0 L V8	Ret		3			6
10	#13	(France) Courage Compétition	Courage LC70	Mugen MF458S 4.5 L V8	Ret	Ret	NC	NC	5	4
11	#15	(United Kingdom) ProTran Competition	ProTran RS06/H	Judd GV5 5.0 L V10			8	Ret		1
NC	#3	(Italy) Lavaggi Sport	Lavaggi LS1	Ford (PME) 6.0 L V8					Ret	0

† - #9 Creation Autosportif broke the tie by having a best finish of 2nd compared to Chamberlain-Synergy's best of 3rd.

=== LMP2 Standings ===
Pos	No	Team	Chassis	Engine	IST (Turkey)	SPA (Belgium)	NÜR (Germany)	DON (United Kingdom)	JAR (Spain)	Total
1	#32	(France) Barazi-Epsilon	Courage C65	AER P07 2.0 L Turbo I4	1	4	6	4	4	28
2	#25	(United Kingdom) RML	MG-Lola EX264	AER P07 2.0 L Turbo I4	6	2	4	1	Ret	26
3	#20	(France) Pir Competition	Pilbeam MP93	Judd XV675 3.4 L V8	2	NC	7	2	3	24
4=	#24	(United States) Binnie Motorsports	Lola B05/42	Zytek ZG348 3.4 L V8		3	2	3	Ret	20
4=	#40	ASM Team Racing for Portugal^{†}	Lola B05/40	AER P07 2.0 L Turbo I4			1	Ret	1	20
6=	#36	(France) Paul Belmondo Racing	Courage C65	Ford (Mecachrome) 3.4 L V8	5	5	Ret	Ret	5	12
6=	#44	(Germany) Kruse Motorsport	Courage C65	Judd XV675 3.4 L V8				5	2	12
8	#39	(United Kingdom) Chamberlain-Synergy Motorsport^{†}	Lola B05/40	AER P07 2.0 L Turbo I4		1				10
9	#35	(Belgium) G-Force Racing	Courage C65	Judd XV675 3.4 L V8	3		8			7
10	#22	(United Kingdom) Rollcentre Racing	Radical SR9	Judd XV675 3.4 L V8	Ret	Ret	3	Ret	Ret	6
11	#37	(France) Paul Belmondo Racing	Courage C65	Ford (Mecachrome) 3.4 L V8	4	NC	NC			5
12	#21	(United Kingdom) Team Bruichladdich Radical	Radical SR9	AER P07 2.0 L Turbo I4			5	Ret	Ret	4
NC	#28	(Italy) Ranieri Randaccio	Lucchini LMP2/04	Judd XV675 3.4 L V8	Ret	Ret	NC			0

† - ASM Team ended their involvement with Chamberlain-Synergy after round 2. ASM Team's entry is considered new and thus the two team scores are not combined.

=== GT1 Standings ===
Pos	No	Team	Chassis	Engine	IST (Turkey)	SPA (Belgium)	NÜR (Germany)	DON (United Kingdom)	JAR (Spain)	Total
1	#50	(France) Aston Martin Racing Larbre	Aston Martin DBR9	Aston Martin AM04 6.0 L V12	1	NC	1	5	2	32
2	#67	(Russia) Convers MenX Team	Ferrari 550-GTS Maranello	Ferrari F133 A 6.0 L V12	2	5	3	3	5	28
3=	#72	(France) Luc Alphand Aventures	Chevrolet Corvette C5-R	Chevrolet LS1 7.0 L V8	3	6	2	2	Ret	25
3=	#55	(France) Team Oreca	Saleen S7-R	Ford Windsor 7.0 L V8		1	4	Ret	1	25
5=	#70	(Belgium) PSI Experience	Chevrolet Corvette C6.R	Chevrolet LS7.R 7.0L V8	Ret	3	Ret	4	4	16
5=	#63	(United Kingdom) Team Modena†	Aston Martin DBR9	Aston Martin AM04 6.0 L V12			Ret	1	3	16
7	#61	(United Kingdom) Cirtek Motorsport†	Aston Martin DBR9	Aston Martin AM04 6.0 L V12	4	2				13
8	#62	(United Kingdom) Cirtek Motorsport	Aston Martin DBR9	Aston Martin AM04 6.0 L V12	5	4				9
NC	#51	(Germany) B-Racing RS Line Team	Lamborghini Murciélago R-GT	Lamborghini L535 6.0 L V12		Ret				0

† - Team Modena ended their involvement with Cirtek after round 2. Team Modena's entry is considered new and thus the two team scores are not combined.

=== GT2 Standings ===
Pos	No	Team	Chassis	Engine	IST (Turkey)	SPA (Belgium)	NÜR (Germany)	DON (United Kingdom)	JAR (Spain)	Total
1	#76	(Italy) Autorlando Sport	Porsche 911 GT3-RSR	Porsche M96/79 3.6 L Flat-6	2	1	2	2	Ret	34
2	#82	(United Kingdom) Team LNT	Panoz Esperante GT-LM	Ford (Élan) Cammer 5.0 L V8	3	2	7	Ret	4	21
3	#81	(United Kingdom) Team LNT	Panoz Esperante GT-LM	Ford (Élan) Cammer 5.0 L V8	Ret	Ret	10	1	1	20
4	#99	(United Kingdom) Virgo Motorsport	Ferrari F430GT	Ferrari F136 GT 4.0 L V8	8	3	4	6	5	19
5	#92	(France) IMSA Performance Matmut	Porsche 911 GT3-RSR	Porsche M96/79 3.6 L Flat-6	4	5	6	5	7	18
6	#97	(Italy) GPC Sport	Ferrari F430GT	Ferrari F136 GT 4.0 L V8	1	Ret	8	3	DSQ	17
7	#86	(Netherlands) Spyker Squadron	Spyker C8 Spyder GT2-R	Audi 4.2 L V8	7	Ret	5	Ret	3	12
8=	#83	(Italy) GPC Sport	Ferrari F430GT	Ferrari F136 GT 4.0 L V8			1	Ret		10
8=	#85	(Netherlands) Spyker Squadron	Spyker C8 Spyder GT2-R	Audi 4.2 L V8	5	10	3	Ret	Ret	10
10=	#90	(Germany) Farnbacher Racing	Porsche 911 GT3-RSR	Porsche M96/79 3.6 L Flat-6	6	Ret	9	4	Ret	8
10=	#78	(Italy) Autorlando Sport	Porsche 911 GT3-RSR	Porsche M96/79 3.6 L Flat-6	11		16	Ret	2	8
10=	#75	(France) Thierry Perrier	Porsche 911 GT3-RSR	Porsche M96/79 3.6 L Flat-6	12	6	Ret	7	6	8
13	#80	(Germany) Farnbacher Racing	Porsche 911 GT3-RSR	Porsche M96/79 3.6 L Flat-6	NC	4	Ret			5
14	#77	(Germany) Seikel Motorsport	Porsche 911 GT3-RSR	Porsche M96/79 3.6 L Flat-6	9	7	12			2
15=	#73	(Belgium) Ice Pol Racing Team	Porsche 911 GT3-RSR	Porsche M96/79 3.6 L Flat-6	10	8	13		Ret	1
15=	#96	(United Kingdom) James Watt Automotive	Porsche 911 GT3-RSR	Porsche M96/79 3.6 L Flat-6		11	14	Ret	8	1
NC	#95	(United Kingdom) Racesport Peninsula TVR	TVR Tuscan T400R	TVR Speed Six 4.0 L I6		9	15	Ret	9	0
NC	#84	(Italy) GPC Sport (Spain) Team Icer Brakes	Ferrari F430GT	Ferrari F136 GT 4.0 L V8	Ret					0
NC	#91	(Japan) T2M Motorsport	Porsche 911 GT3-RSR	Porsche M96/79 3.6 L Flat-6		Ret	11			0

== Drivers Championships ==
Points are awarded to the top 8 finishers in the order of 10-8-6-5-4-3-2-1. Drivers who do not drive for at least one hour do not receive points.

Points are awarded to a single driver and car combination. If a driver wins points driving a different car in a different event, those points are listed separately. Drivers listed multiple times in the points standings are marked with an asterisk.

=== LMP1 Standings ===
Pos	Driver	Team	IST (Turkey)	SPA (Belgium)	NÜR (Germany)	DON (United Kingdom)	JAR (Spain)	Total
1	(France) Emmanuel Collard	(France) Pescarolo Sport	1	1	1	1	1	50
1	(France) Jean-Christophe Boullion	(France) Pescarolo Sport	1	1	1	1	1	50
2	(France) Didier André	(France) Pescarolo Sport				1	1	20
3	(Switzerland) Felipe Ortiz	(United Kingdom) Creation Autosportif	Ret		2	3	3	20
3	(Italy) Beppe Gabbiani	(United Kingdom) Creation Autosportif	Ret		2	3	3	20
4	(United Kingdom) Bob Berridge	(United Kingdom) Chamberlain-Synergy Motorsport	3	Ret	4	5	4	20
4	(United Kingdom) Gareth Evans	(United Kingdom) Chamberlain-Synergy Motorsport	3	Ret	4	5	4	20
5	(Switzerland) Harold Primat	(Switzerland) Swiss Spirit	Ret	2	6	Ret	2	19
5	(Switzerland) Marcel Fässler	(Switzerland) Swiss Spirit	Ret	2	6	Ret	2	19
6	(France) Nicolas Minassian	(United Kingdom) Creation Autosportif	Ret		(2)	2	3	14
7	(United Kingdom) Peter Owen	(United Kingdom) Chamberlain-Synergy Motorsport	(3)	Ret	4	5	4	14
8	(France) Éric Hélary	(France) Pescarolo Sport			1			10
9	(United Kingdom) Kevin McGarrity	(United Kingdom) Creation Autosportif			8	2		9
10	(Denmark) Jens Møller	(United Kingdom) Lister Storm Racing	2	Ret		Ret		8
=	(Denmark) Nicolas Kiesa	(United Kingdom) Lister Storm Racing	2	Ret				8
12	(France) Jean-Marc Gounon	(France) Courage Compétition	Ret	NC	7	4	Ret	7
12	(United Kingdom) Gregor Fisken	(France) Courage Compétition		Ret	7	4	Ret	7
12	(Switzerland) Alexander Frei	(France) Courage Compétition		NC	7	4	Ret	7
13	(Denmark) John Nielsen	(United Kingdom) Zytek Engineering		3				6
13	(Denmark) Casper Elgaard	(United Kingdom) Zytek Engineering		3				6
13	(Denmark) Philip Andersen	(United Kingdom) Zytek Engineering		3				6
14	(Netherlands) Jan Lammers	(Netherlands) Racing for Holland			3			6
14	(Malaysia) Alex Yoong	(Netherlands) Racing for Holland			3			6
15	(United Kingdom) Jamie Campbell-Walter	(United Kingdom) Creation Autosportif				3		6
16	(Sweden) Stefan Johansson	(United Kingdom) Zytek Engineering			5	Ret		4
16	(Japan) Hideki Noda	(United Kingdom) Zytek Engineering			5	Ret		4
17	(Japan) Shinji Nakano	(France) Courage Compétition	Ret	Ret	NC	NC	5	4
17	(Japan) Haruki Kurosawa	(France) Courage Compétition	Ret	Ret	NC	NC	5	4
18	(United Kingdom) Paul Cope	(United Kingdom) ProTran Competition			8	Ret		1
=	(United Kingdom) Ben Collins	(United Kingdom) ProTran Competition			8			1
NC	(United Kingdom) Justin Keen	(United Kingdom) Lister Storm Racing	(2)			Ret		0
NC	(United Kingdom) Phil Bennett	(United Kingdom) ProTran Competition				Ret		0
NC	(France) Xavier Pompidou	(Italy) Lavaggi Sport					Ret	0
NC	(Italy) Giovanni Lavaggi	(Italy) Lavaggi Sport					Ret	0

=== LMP2 Standings ===
Pos	Driver	Team	IST (Turkey)	SPA (Belgium)	NÜR (Germany)	DON (United Kingdom)	JAR (Spain)	Total
1	(Netherlands) Michael Vergers	(France) Barazi-Epsilon	1	4	6	4	4	28
1	(Denmark) Juan Barazi	(France) Barazi-Epsilon	1	4	6	4	4	28
2	(United Kingdom) Mike Newton	(United Kingdom) RML	6	2	4	1	Ret	26
2	(Brazil) Thomas Erdos	(United Kingdom) RML	6	2	4	1	Ret	26
3	(France) Marc Rostan	(France) Pir Competition	2	NC	7	2	3	24
3	(France) Pierre Bruneau	(France) Pir Competition	2	NC	7	2	3	24
4	(Spain) Miguel Ángel de Castro	ASM Team Racing for Portugal		(1)	1	Ret	1	20
4	(Spain) Ángel Burgueño	ASM Team Racing for Portugal		(1)	1	Ret	1	20
4	(Portugal) Miguel Amaral	ASM Team Racing for Portugal		(1)	1	Ret	1	20
5	(United Kingdom) Sam Hancock	(United States) Binnie Motorsports		3	2	3	Ret	20
5	(United Kingdom) Allen Timpany	(United States) Binnie Motorsports		3	2	3	Ret	20
6	(Italy) Davide Valsecchi	(France) Barazi-Epsilon		4		4	4	15
7	(United States) William Binnie	(United States) Binnie Motorsports		(3)	2	3	Ret	14
8	(France) Jean-Philippe Belloc	(France) Barazi-Epsilon	1		6			13
9	(Denmark) Jens Petersen	(Belgium) G-Force Racing			(8)			12
9	(Denmark) Jens Petersen	(Germany) Kruse Motorsport				5	2	12
9	(Denmark) Jan-Dirk Leuders	(Belgium) G-Force Racing			(8)			12
9	(Denmark) Jan-Dirk Leuders	(Germany) Kruse Motorsport				5	2	12
10	(Saudi Arabia) Karim Ojjeh	(France) Paul Belmondo Racing	5	5	Ret	Ret	5	12
10	(France) Pierre Ragues	(France) Paul Belmondo Racing	5	5	Ret	Ret	5	12
11	(Austria) Norbert Siedler	(Germany) Kruse Motorsport					2	8
12	(France) Claude-Yves Gosselin	(France) Paul Belmondo Racing	5	5		Ret		8
13	(United Kingdom) Ed Morris	(Belgium) G-Force Racing	3					6
13	(France) Jean-François Leroch	(Belgium) G-Force Racing	3					6
14	(Portugal) João Barbosa	(United Kingdom) Rollcentre Racing	Ret		3	Ret	Ret	6
14	(United Kingdom) Martin Short	(United Kingdom) Rollcentre Racing	Ret	Ret	3	Ret	Ret	6
15	(France) Didier André	(France) Paul Belmondo Racing	4	NC	NC			5
15	(France) Yann Clairay	(France) Paul Belmondo Racing	4	NC				5
15	(France) Paul Belmondo	(France) Paul Belmondo Racing	4				(5)	5
16	(United Kingdom) Tim Greaves	(United Kingdom) Rollcentre Racing	Ret	Ret				4
16	(United Kingdom) Tim Greaves	(United Kingdom) Team Bruichladdich Radical			5	Ret	Ret	4
16	(United Kingdom) Stuart Moseley	(United Kingdom) Team Bruichladdich Radical			5	Ret	Ret	4
17	(Canada) Tony Burgess	(Germany) Kruse Motorsport				5		4
18	(Germany) Christophe Brück	(Belgium) G-Force Racing			8			1
NC	(Belgium) Frank Hahn	(Belgium) G-Force Racing	(3)					0
NC	(France) Jean-Bernard Bouvet	(France) Paul Belmondo Racing			NC			0
NC	(Italy) Ranieri Randaccio	(Italy) Ranieri Randaccio	Ret	Ret	Ret			0
NC	(Italy) Fabio Mancini	(Italy) Ranieri Randaccio	Ret	Ret	Ret			0
NC	(Italy) Gianni Collini	(Italy) Ranieri Randaccio	Ret	Ret	Ret			0
NC	(United Kingdom) Rob Barff	(United Kingdom) Rollcentre Racing				Ret	Ret	0
NC	(United Kingdom) Gregor Fisken	(United Kingdom) Rollcentre Racing		Ret				0
NC	(United Kingdom) Ben Devlin	(United Kingdom) Team Bruichladdich Radical				Ret		0

=== GT1 Standings ===
Pos	Driver	Team	IST (Turkey)	SPA (Belgium)	NÜR (Germany)	DON (United Kingdom)	JAR (Spain)	Total
1	(Portugal) Pedro Lamy	(France) Aston Martin Racing Larbre	1	Ret	1	5	2	32
1	(Switzerland) Gabriele Gardel	(France) Aston Martin Racing Larbre	1	Ret	1	5	2	32
1	(Belgium) Vincent Vosse	(France) Aston Martin Racing Larbre	1	Ret	1	5	2	32
2	(Netherlands) Peter Kox	(Russia) Convers MenX Team	2	5	3	3	5	28
2	(Russia) Alexey Vasilyev	(Russia) Convers MenX Team	2	5	3	3	5	28
2	(Czech Republic) Robert Pergl	(Russia) Convers MenX Team	2	5	3	3	5	28
3	(Monaco) Stéphane Ortelli	(France) Team Oreca		1	4	Ret	1	25
3	(France) Soheil Ayari	(France) Team Oreca		1	4	Ret	1	25
4	(France) Jérôme Policand	(France) Luc Alphand Aventures	3	6	2	2	Ret	25
4	(France) Patrice Goueslard	(France) Luc Alphand Aventures	3	6	2	2	Ret	25
5	(United Kingdom) Peter Hardman	(United Kingdom) Cirtek Motorsport	5	4	Ret			25
5	(United Kingdom) Peter Hardman	(United Kingdom) Team Modena				1	3	25
5	(Spain) Antonio García	(United Kingdom) Cirtek Motorsport	5	4	Ret			25
5	(Spain) Antonio García	(United Kingdom) Team Modena				1	3	25
6	(France) Luc Alphand	(France) Luc Alphand Aventures			2	2	Ret	16
7	(Finland) Pertti Kuismanen	(Belgium) PSI Experience	Ret	3	Ret	4	4	16
7	(Netherlands) Jos Menten	(Belgium) PSI Experience	Ret	3	Ret	4	4	16
7	(Finland) Markus Palttala	(Belgium) PSI Experience	Ret	3	Ret	4	4	16
8	(United Kingdom) Christian Vann	(United Kingdom) Cirtek Motorsport	5	4	Ret			9
9	(United Kingdom) Richard Lyons	(United Kingdom) Cirtek Motorsport		2				8
10	(France) Anthony Beltoise	(France) Luc Alphand Aventures	3	(6)				6
11	(Australia) David Brabham	(United Kingdom) Team Modena					3	6
12	(United Kingdom) Nathan Kinch	(United Kingdom) Cirtek Motorsport	4					5
13	(United Kingdom) Jamie Campbell-Walter	(United Kingdom) Cirtek Motorsport		4				5
NC	(Switzerland) Benjamin Leuenberger	(Germany) B-Racing RS Line Team		Ret				0
NC	(Germany) Norbert Walchhofer	(Germany) B-Racing RS Line Team		Ret				0
NC	(United Kingdom) Marino Franchitti	(Germany) B-Racing RS Line Team		Ret				0

=== GT2 Standings ===
Pos	Driver	Team	IST (Turkey)	SPA (Belgium)	NÜR (Germany)	DON (United Kingdom)	JAR (Spain)	Total
1	(Switzerland) Joël Camathias	(Italy) Autorlando Sport	2	1	2	2	Ret	34
1	(Germany) Marc Lieb	(Italy) Autorlando Sport	2	1	2	2	Ret	34
2	(United Kingdom) Lawrence Tomlinson	(United Kingdom) Team LNT	3	2	7	Ret	4	21
2	(United Kingdom) Richard Dean	(United Kingdom) Team LNT	3	2	7	Ret	4	21
3	(United Kingdom) Warren Hughes	(United Kingdom) Team LNT	Ret	Ret	10	1	1	20
3	(United Kingdom) Robert Bell	(United Kingdom) Team LNT	Ret	Ret	10	1	1	20
4	(United Kingdom) Dan Eagling	(United Kingdom) Virgo Motorsport	8	3	4	6	5	19
4	(United Kingdom) Tim Sugden	(United Kingdom) Virgo Motorsport	8	3	4	6	5	19
5	(France) Christophe Bouchut	(France) IMSA Performance Matmut	4	5	6	5	7	18
5	(France) Raymond Narac	(France) IMSA Performance Matmut	4	5	6	5	7	18
6	(Italy) Luca Drudi	(Italy) GPC Sport	1	Ret	8	3	DSQ	17
7	(United Kingdom) Jonny Kane	(Netherlands) Spyker Squadron	7	Ret	5	Ret	3	12
8	(Italy) Fabrizio de Simone	(Italy) GPC Sport	1	Ret			DSQ	10
9	(Italy) Stefano Zonca	(Italy) GPC Sport			1	Ret		10
9	(Italy) Andrea Belicchi	(Italy) GPC Sport			1	Ret		10
9	(Italy) Marco Cioci	(Italy) GPC Sport			1	Ret		10
10	(Netherlands) Jeroen Bleekemolen	(Netherlands) Spyker Squadron	5	10	3	Ret	Ret	10
10	(Netherlands) Mike Hezemans	(Netherlands) Spyker Squadron	5	10	3		Ret	10
11	(Germany) Marco Seefried	(Germany) Farnbacher Racing	NC	4	NC	4	Ret	10
12	(United Kingdom) Tom Kimber-Smith	(United Kingdom) Team LNT		2				8
13	(Denmark) Gunnar Kristensen	(Italy) Autorlando Sport	11		16	Ret	2	8
13	(Denmark) Allan Simonsen	(Italy) Autorlando Sport	11		16	Ret	2	8
14	(United Kingdom) Pierre Ehret	(Germany) Farnbacher Racing	6	Ret	9	4	Ret	8
14	(Germany) Dominik Farnbacher	(Germany) Farnbacher Racing	6	Ret	9	4		8
15	(United Kingdom) Nigel Smith	(France) Thierry Perrier	12	6	Ret	7	6	8
15	(France) Philippe Hesnault	(France) Thierry Perrier	12	6	Ret	7	6	8
16	(Italy) Gabrio Rosa	(Italy) GPC Sport	(1)	Ret	8	3		7
17	(United Kingdom) Marc Hynes	(United Kingdom) Team LNT			7	Ret	4	7
18	(Italy) Andrea Montermini	(Italy) GPC Sport				3		6
19	(United Kingdom) Peter Dumbreck	(Netherlands) Spyker Squadron				Ret	3	6
20	(France) Sébastian Dumez	(France) IMSA Performance Matmut	4					5
21	(Denmark) Lars-Erik Nielsen	(Germany) Farnbacher Racing	NC	4	NC			5
22	(France) Anthony Beltoise	(France) Thierry Perrier			Ret	7	6	5
23	(Portugal) João Barbosa	(France) Thierry Perrier		6				3
24	(Netherlands) Donny Crevels	(Netherlands) Spyker Squadron	7	Ret				2
25	(Canada) Tony Burgess	(Germany) Seikel Motorsport	9	7	12			2
25	(United States) Philip Collin	(Germany) Seikel Motorsport	9	7	12			2
26	(United Kingdom) Ian Khan	(United Kingdom) Virgo Motorsport	8					1
27	(Belgium) Yves Lambert	(Belgium) Ice Pol Racing Team	10	8	13		Ret	1
27	(Belgium) Christian Lefort	(Belgium) Ice Pol Racing Team	10	8	13		Ret	1
27	(France) Romain Iannetta	(Belgium) Ice Pol Racing Team	10	8				1
28	(Germany) Wolfgang Kaufmann	(United Kingdom) James Watt Automotive					8	1
28	(United Kingdom) Peter Cook	(United Kingdom) James Watt Automotive					8	1
28	(United Kingdom) Paul Daniels	(United Kingdom) James Watt Automotive		11	14	Ret	8	1
