= Vincent Vosse =

Belgian racing driver

Vincent Michel René Vosse (born 1 May 1972) is a Belgian professional racing driver and team manager. He is the owner and team principal of Team WRT.

== Racing record ==
=== 24 Hours of Le Mans results ===
Year	Team	Co-Drivers	Car	Class	Laps	Pos.	Class Pos.
1999	(Germany) Roock Racing	(Germany) André Ahrlé (Germany) Claudia Hürtgen	Porsche 911 GT2	GTS	290	20th	8th
2001	(France) Paul Belmondo Racing	(Belgium) Vanina Ickx (Sweden) Carl Rosenblad	Chrysler Viper GTS-R	GTS	61	DNF	DNF
2002	(France) Larbre Compétition	(France) Christophe Bouchut (France) Patrice Goueslard	Chrysler Viper GTS-R	GTS	319	18th	4th
2005	(France) Larbre Compétition	(France) Patrice Goueslard (France) Olivier Dupard	Ferrari 550-GTS Maranello	GT1	324	12th	4th
2007	(France) Luc Alphand Aventures	(France) Jean-Luc Blanchemain (France) Didier André	Chevrolet Corvette C5-R	GT1	306	24th	11th

=== Complete Le Mans Series results ===
Year	Entrant	Class	Car	Engine	1	2	3	4	5	6	Pos.	Pts
2005	Luc Alphand Aventures	LMP2	Courage C65	Ford (AER) 2.0L Turbo I4	SPA; 6	MNZ; 1	SIL; 1	NÜR; NC	IST; 5		3rd	27
2006	Aston Martin Racing Larbre	GT1	Aston Martin DBR9	Aston Martin 6.0 V12	IST; 1	SPA; NC	NÜR; 1	DON; 5	JAR; 2		1st	32
2007	Luc Alphand Aventures	GT1	Chevrolet Corvette C5-R	Chevrolet 7.0 L V8	MNZ; 3	VAL	NÜR; 5	SPA; Ret	SIL; 3	INT	17th	16

=== Complete 24 Hours of Spa results ===
Year	Team	Co-Drivers	Car	Class	Laps	Pos.	Class Pos.
1995	(Belgium) Belgian VW Audi Club	(Belgium) Philippe Adams (South Africa) Terry Moss	Audi 80 Quattro	ST	454	7th	5th
1996	(Belgium) Honda Team PCA-Mobil 1	(United Kingdom) Richard Piper (Belgium) Philip Verellen	Honda Accord	ST		DNF	DNF
1997	(Belgium) Belgian VW Audi Club	(Belgium) Pierre-Yves Corthals (Belgium) Geoffrey Horion	VW Golf GTI 16V	ST	189	DNF	DNF
1998	(Belgium) Belgacom Nissan T.U.R.B.O. Team	(United Kingdom) Anthony Reid (Sweden) Anders Olofsson	Nissan Primera	SP		DNF	DNF
1999	(Italy) BMW Fina Rafanelli	(Belgium) Didier de Radigues (Belgium) Marc Duez	BMW 320i	SP	51	DNF	DNF
2000	(Italy) BMW Fina Rafanelli	(Belgium) Marc Duez (Netherlands) Patrick Huisman	BMW 320i	SP		DNF	DNF
2001	(France) Paul Belmondo Racing	(France) Emmanuel Clérico (France) Eric Hélary	Chrysler Viper GTS-R	GT	516	4th	4th
2002	(France) Larbre Compétition	(France) Christophe Bouchut (France) Sébastien Bourdais (France) David Terrien	Chrysler Viper GTS-R	GT	526	1st	1st
2003	(France) Larbre Compétition	(France) Christophe Bouchut (France) Sébastien Dumez (Netherlands) Patrick Huisman	Chrysler Viper GTS-R	GT	469	4th	2nd
2004	(Italy) G.P.C. Giesse Squadra Corse	(Italy) Fabio Babini (Austria) Philipp Peter (Finland) Mika Salo	Ferrari 575-GTC Maranello	GT	557	2nd	2nd
2005	(France) Larbre Compétition	(France) Christophe Bouchut (Switzerland) Gabriele Gardel (Belgium) Kurt Mollekens	Ferrari 550-GTS Maranello	GT1	567	3rd	3rd
2006	(Germany) Vitaphone Racing	(Italy) Thomas Biagi (United Kingdom) Jamie Davies	Maserati MC12 GT1	GT1	44	DNF	DNF
2007	(France) Luc Alphand Aventures	(Monaco) Olivier Beretta (Belgium) Greg Franchi (United Kingdom) Oliver Gavin	Chevrolet Corvette C6.R	GT1	521	6th	6th
2009	(Germany) Vitaphone Racing	(Belgium) Stéphane Lémeret (Italy) Alessandro Pier Guidi (Sweden) Carl Rosenblad	Maserati MC12 GT1	GT1	548	2nd	2nd
2010	(Belgium) WRT Belgian Audi Club	(Germany) Frank Biela (Belgium) Grégory Franchi (Germany) Frank Stippler	Audi R8 LMS	GT3	57	DNF	DNF

=== Complete 24 Hours of Nürburgring results ===
Year	Team	Co-Drivers	Car	Class	Laps	Pos.	Class Pos.
2001	(Germany) Duller Motorsport	(United Kingdom) Ian Donaldson (United Kingdom) Gregor Fisken (Austria) Oliver Tichy	BMW M3	N6	76	DNF	DNF
2003	(Germany) Raeder Motorsport	(United Kingdom) Phil Bennett (Germany) Markus Großmann (United Kingdom) Jonathan Price	Porsche 996 GT3-RS	A7	95	120th	13th
2004	(Germany) Duller Motorsport	(Germany) Artur Deutgen (Austria) Philipp Peter (Austria) Dieter Quester	BMW M3 E46	A6	9	DNF	DNF
2008	(United Kingdom) RJN Motorsport	(United Kingdom) Alex Buncombe (Germany) Harald Müller (Denmark) Nicki Thiim	Nissan 350Z	SP6	12	DNF	DNF

=== Complete 24 Hours of Zolder results ===
Year	Team	Co-Drivers	Car	Class	Laps	Pos.	Class Pos.
1997	(Belgium) Geert van de Venne	(Belgium) Marc Goossens (Netherlands) Patrick Huisman	Porsche 911 RSR	GT	710	1st	1st
1998	(Belgium) GLPK Racing	(Belgium) Patrick Snijers (Belgium) Kurt Thiers	Porsche 911 RSR	GT1	674	4th	4th
2003	(Finland) Kuismanen Racing	(Finland) Matti Alamäki (Austria) Karl Hasenbichler (Finland) Pertti Kuismanen	Chrysler Viper GTS-R	GTA	717	10th	4th
2004	(Belgium) PSI Motorsport	(Belgium) Frédéric Bouvy (Belgium) Kurt Mollekens	Porsche 996 GT3 Cup	GTB	690	14th	8th
2005	(Finland) Kuismanen Competition	(Finland) Matti Alamäki (Netherlands) Duncan Huisman (Finland) Pertti Kuismanen	Chrysler Viper GTS-R	GTA	745	8th	3rd
2007	(Belgium) Gravity Racing International	(Belgium) Christian Kelders (Belgium) Yves Lambert	Mosler MT900R	Belcar 1	751	8th	6th
2008	(France) Sport Garage	(Portugal) Pedro Lamy (Belgium) Eddy Renard (Switzerland) Steve Zacchia	Ferrari F430 GT3	Belcar 1	725	14th	7th
