= 2006 1000 km of Nürburgring =

Sports car endurance race in Germany

Nürburgring

The 2006 1000km of Nürburgring was the third race of the 2006 Le Mans Series season run by the ACO. It was run on July 16, 2006.

== Official results ==
Class winners in bold. Cars failing to complete 70% of winner's distance marked as Not Classified (NC).

Pos	Class	No	Team	Drivers	Chassis	Tyre	Laps
Pos	Class	No	Team	Drivers	Engine	Tyre	Laps
1	**LMP1**	**17**	**(France) Pescarolo Sport**	**(France) Emmanuel Collard (France) Jean-Christophe Boullion (France) Éric Hélary**	**Pescarolo C60 Hybrid**	MI	**189**
1	**LMP1**	**17**	**(France) Pescarolo Sport**	**(France) Emmanuel Collard (France) Jean-Christophe Boullion (France) Éric Hélary**	**Judd GV5 S2 5.0L V10**	MI	**189**
2	LMP1	9	(United Kingdom) Creation Autosportif	(France) Nicolas Minassian (Italy) Beppe Gabbiani (Switzerland) Felipe Oritz	Creation CA06/H	MI	186
2	LMP1	9	(United Kingdom) Creation Autosportif	(France) Nicolas Minassian (Italy) Beppe Gabbiani (Switzerland) Felipe Oritz	Judd GV5 S2 5.0L V10	MI	186
3	LMP1	14	(Netherlands) Racing for Holland	(Netherlands) Jan Lammers (Malaysia) Alex Yoong	Dome S101Hb	D	186
3	LMP1	14	(Netherlands) Racing for Holland	(Netherlands) Jan Lammers (Malaysia) Alex Yoong	Mugen MF408S 4.0L V8	D	186
4	LMP1	19	(United Kingdom) Chamberlain-Synergy Motorsport	(United Kingdom) Bob Berridge (United Kingdom) Gareth Evans (United Kingdom) Peter Owen	Lola B06/10	D	184
4	LMP1	19	(United Kingdom) Chamberlain-Synergy Motorsport	(United Kingdom) Bob Berridge (United Kingdom) Gareth Evans (United Kingdom) Peter Owen	AER P32T 3.6L Turbo V8	D	184
5	**LMP2**	**40**	**ASM Team Racing for Portugal**	**(Portugal) Miguel Amaral (Spain) Ángel Burgueño (Spain) Miguel Angel Castro**	**Lola B05/40**	D	**183**
5	**LMP2**	**40**	**ASM Team Racing for Portugal**	**(Portugal) Miguel Amaral (Spain) Ángel Burgueño (Spain) Miguel Angel Castro**	**AER P07 2.0L Turbo I4**	D	**183**
6	LMP2	24	(United States) Binnie Motorsports	(United States) William Binnie (United Kingdom) Allen Timpany (United Kingdom) Sam Hancock	Lola B05/42	MI	182
6	LMP2	24	(United States) Binnie Motorsports	(United States) William Binnie (United Kingdom) Allen Timpany (United Kingdom) Sam Hancock	Zytek ZG348 3.4L V8	MI	182
7	LMP1	2	(United Kingdom) Zytek Engineering	(Sweden) Stefan Johansson (Japan) Hideki Noda	Zytek 06S	MI	181
7	LMP1	2	(United Kingdom) Zytek Engineering	(Sweden) Stefan Johansson (Japan) Hideki Noda	Zytek 2ZG408 4.0L V8	MI	181
8	LMP2	22	(United Kingdom) Rollcentre Racing	(Portugal) João Barbosa (United Kingdom) Martin Short	Radical SR9	D	181
8	LMP2	22	(United Kingdom) Rollcentre Racing	(Portugal) João Barbosa (United Kingdom) Martin Short	Judd XV675 3.4L V8	D	181
9	LMP2	25	(United Kingdom) Ray Mallock Ltd. (RML)	(United Kingdom) Mike Newton (Brazil) Thomas Erdos	MG-Lola EX264	MI	180
9	LMP2	25	(United Kingdom) Ray Mallock Ltd. (RML)	(United Kingdom) Mike Newton (Brazil) Thomas Erdos	AER P07 2.0L Turbo I4	MI	180
10	**GT1**	**50**	**(France) Aston Martin Racing Larbre**	**(Portugal) Pedro Lamy (Switzerland) Gabriele Gardel (Belgium) Vincent Vosse**	**Aston Martin DBR9**	MI	**177**
10	**GT1**	**50**	**(France) Aston Martin Racing Larbre**	**(Portugal) Pedro Lamy (Switzerland) Gabriele Gardel (Belgium) Vincent Vosse**	**Aston Martin 6.0L V12**	MI	**177**
11	GT1	72	(France) Luc Alphand Aventures	(France) Jérôme Policand (France) Patrice Goueslard (France) Luc Alphand	Chevrolet Corvette C5-R	MI	177
11	GT1	72	(France) Luc Alphand Aventures	(France) Jérôme Policand (France) Patrice Goueslard (France) Luc Alphand	Chevrolet LS7R 7.0L V8	MI	177
12	LMP1	5	(Switzerland) Swiss Spirit	(Switzerland) Marcel Fässler (Switzerland) Harold Primat	Courage LC70	MI	176
12	LMP1	5	(Switzerland) Swiss Spirit	(Switzerland) Marcel Fässler (Switzerland) Harold Primat	Judd GV5 S2 5.0L V10	MI	176
13	GT1	67	(Russia) Convers MenX Team	(Netherlands) Peter Kox (Czech Republic) Robert Pergl (Russia) Alexey Vasilyev	Ferrari 550-GTS Maranello	MI	176
13	GT1	67	(Russia) Convers MenX Team	(Netherlands) Peter Kox (Czech Republic) Robert Pergl (Russia) Alexey Vasilyev	Ferrari F131 6.0L V12	MI	176
14	LMP1	12	(France) Courage Compétition	(France) Jean-Marc Gounon (Switzerland) Alexander Frei (United Kingdom) Gregor Fisken	Courage LC70	Y	172
14	LMP1	12	(France) Courage Compétition	(France) Jean-Marc Gounon (Switzerland) Alexander Frei (United Kingdom) Gregor Fisken	Mugen MF458S 4.5L V8	Y	172
15	LMP2	21	(United Kingdom) Team Bruichladdich Radical	(United Kingdom) Tim Greaves (United Kingdom) Stuart Moseley	Radical SR9	D	171
15	LMP2	21	(United Kingdom) Team Bruichladdich Radical	(United Kingdom) Tim Greaves (United Kingdom) Stuart Moseley	AER P07 2.0L Turbo I4	D	171
16	**GT2**	**83**	**(Italy) GPC Sport**	**(Italy) Stefano Zonca (Italy) Andrea Belicchi (Italy) Marco Cioci**	**Ferrari F430GT**	P	**171**
16	**GT2**	**83**	**(Italy) GPC Sport**	**(Italy) Stefano Zonca (Italy) Andrea Belicchi (Italy) Marco Cioci**	**Ferrari 4.0L V8**	P	**171**
17	GT1	55	(France) Team Oreca	(Monaco) Stéphane Ortelli (France) Soheil Ayari	Saleen S7-R	MI	171
17	GT1	55	(France) Team Oreca	(Monaco) Stéphane Ortelli (France) Soheil Ayari	Ford 7.0L V8	MI	171
18	GT2	76	(Italy) Autorlando Sport	(Germany) Marc Lieb (Switzerland) Joël Camathias	Porsche 911 GT3-RSR	P	170
18	GT2	76	(Italy) Autorlando Sport	(Germany) Marc Lieb (Switzerland) Joël Camathias	Porsche 3.6L Flat-6	P	170
19	GT2	85	(Netherlands) Spyker Squadron b.v.	(Netherlands) Jeroen Bleekemolen (Netherlands) Mike Hezemans	Spyker C8 Spyder GT2-R	D	170
19	GT2	85	(Netherlands) Spyker Squadron b.v.	(Netherlands) Jeroen Bleekemolen (Netherlands) Mike Hezemans	Audi 3.8L V8	D	170
20	GT2	99	(United Kingdom) Virgo Motorsport	(United Kingdom) Dan Eagling (United Kingdom) Tim Sugden	Ferrari F430GT	D	170
20	GT2	99	(United Kingdom) Virgo Motorsport	(United Kingdom) Dan Eagling (United Kingdom) Tim Sugden	Ferrari 4.0L V8	D	170
21	GT2	86	(Netherlands) Spyker Squadron b.v.	(Netherlands) Tom Coronel (United Kingdom) Jonny Kane	Spyker C8 Spyder GT2-R	D	170
21	GT2	86	(Netherlands) Spyker Squadron b.v.	(Netherlands) Tom Coronel (United Kingdom) Jonny Kane	Audi 3.8L V8	D	170
22	GT2	92	(France) IMSA Performance Matmut	(France) Christophe Bouchut (France) Raymond Narac	Porsche 911 GT3-RSR	D	169
22	GT2	92	(France) IMSA Performance Matmut	(France) Christophe Bouchut (France) Raymond Narac	Porsche 3.6L Flat-6	D	169
23	GT2	82	(United Kingdom) Team LNT	(United Kingdom) Lawrence Tomlinson (United Kingdom) Richard Dean (United Kingdom) Marc Hynes	Panoz Esperante GT-LM	P	169
23	GT2	82	(United Kingdom) Team LNT	(United Kingdom) Lawrence Tomlinson (United Kingdom) Richard Dean (United Kingdom) Marc Hynes	Ford (Élan) 5.0L V8	P	169
24	GT2	97	(Italy) GPC Sport	(Italy) Luca Drudi (Italy) Gabrio Rosa	Ferrari F430GT	P	168
24	GT2	97	(Italy) GPC Sport	(Italy) Luca Drudi (Italy) Gabrio Rosa	Ferrari 4.0L V8	P	168
25	GT2	90	(Germany) Farnbacher Racing	(Germany) Pierre Ehret (Germany) Dominik Farnbacher	Porsche 911 GT3-RSR	Y	167
25	GT2	90	(Germany) Farnbacher Racing	(Germany) Pierre Ehret (Germany) Dominik Farnbacher	Porsche 3.6L Flat-6	Y	167
26	LMP2	32	(France) Barazi-Epsilon	(Netherlands) Michael Vergers (Denmark) Juan Barazi (France) Jean-Philippe Belloc	Courage C65	MI	167
26	LMP2	32	(France) Barazi-Epsilon	(Netherlands) Michael Vergers (Denmark) Juan Barazi (France) Jean-Philippe Belloc	AER P07 2.0L Turbo I4	MI	167
27	GT2	81	(United Kingdom) Team LNT	(United Kingdom) Warren Hughes (United Kingdom) Robert Bell	Panoz Esperante GT-LM	P	165
27	GT2	81	(United Kingdom) Team LNT	(United Kingdom) Warren Hughes (United Kingdom) Robert Bell	Ford (Élan) 5.0L V8	P	165
28	GT2	91	(Japan) T2M Motorsport	(Japan) Yutaka Yamagishi (United Kingdom) Robin Liddell (Germany) Marc Basseng	Porsche 911 GT3-RS	D	165
28	GT2	91	(Japan) T2M Motorsport	(Japan) Yutaka Yamagishi (United Kingdom) Robin Liddell (Germany) Marc Basseng	Porsche 3.6L Flat-6	D	165
29	GT2	77	(Germany) Seikel Motorsport	(Canada) Tony Burgess (United States) Philip Collin (Germany) Tim Bergmeister	Porsche 911 GT3-RSR	Y	163
29	GT2	77	(Germany) Seikel Motorsport	(Canada) Tony Burgess (United States) Philip Collin (Germany) Tim Bergmeister	Porsche 3.6L Flat-6	Y	163
30	GT2	73	(Belgium) Ice Pol Racing Team	(Belgium) Yves-Emmanuel Lambert (Belgium) Christian Lefort (Belgium) Marc Duez	Porsche 911 GT3-RSR	D	163
30	GT2	73	(Belgium) Ice Pol Racing Team	(Belgium) Yves-Emmanuel Lambert (Belgium) Christian Lefort (Belgium) Marc Duez	Porsche 3.6L Flat-6	D	163
31	LMP2	20	(France) Pierre Bruneau	(France) Pierre Bruneau (France) Marc Rostan	Pilbeam MP93	MI	160
31	LMP2	20	(France) Pierre Bruneau	(France) Pierre Bruneau (France) Marc Rostan	Judd XV675 3.4L V8	MI	160
32	GT2	96	(United Kingdom) James Watt Automotive	(United Kingdom) Paul Daniels (United Kingdom) Bryce Washington	Porsche 911 GT3-RSR	D	158
32	GT2	96	(United Kingdom) James Watt Automotive	(United Kingdom) Paul Daniels (United Kingdom) Bryce Washington	Porsche 3.6L Flat-6	D	158
33	LMP2	35	(Belgium) G-Force Racing (Germany) Kruse Motorsport	(Germany) Jan-Dirk Leuders (Germany) Jens Petersen (Germany) Christophe Brück	Courage C65	KU	155
33	LMP2	35	(Belgium) G-Force Racing (Germany) Kruse Motorsport	(Germany) Jan-Dirk Leuders (Germany) Jens Petersen (Germany) Christophe Brück	Judd XV675 3.4L V8	KU	155
34	GT2	95	(United Kingdom) Racesport Peninsula TVR	(United Kingdom) John Hartshorne (United Kingdom) Iain Dockerill (United Kingdom) Nigel Greensall	TVR Tuscan T400R	D	154
34	GT2	95	(United Kingdom) Racesport Peninsula TVR	(United Kingdom) John Hartshorne (United Kingdom) Iain Dockerill (United Kingdom) Nigel Greensall	TVR Speed Six 4.0L I6	D	154
35	GT2	78	(Italy) Autorlando Sport	(Denmark) Gunnar Kristensen (Denmark) Allan Simonsen	Porsche 911 GT3-RSR	P	152
35	GT2	78	(Italy) Autorlando Sport	(Denmark) Gunnar Kristensen (Denmark) Allan Simonsen	Porsche 3.6L Flat-6	P	152
36	LMP1	15	(United Kingdom) ProTran Competition	(United Kingdom) Kevin McGarrity (United Kingdom) Paul Cope (United Kingdom) Ben Collins	ProTran RS06/H	D	149
36	LMP1	15	(United Kingdom) ProTran Competition	(United Kingdom) Kevin McGarrity (United Kingdom) Paul Cope (United Kingdom) Ben Collins	Judd GV5 S2 5.0L V10	D	149
37 NC	LMP1	13	(France) Courage Compétition	(Japan) Shinji Nakano (Japan) Haruki Kurosawa	Courage LC70	Y	73
37 NC	LMP1	13	(France) Courage Compétition	(Japan) Shinji Nakano (Japan) Haruki Kurosawa	Mugen MF458S 4.5L V8	Y	73
38 NC	LMP2	37	(France) Paul Belmondo Racing	(France) Didier André (France) Jean-Bernard Bouvet	Courage C65	P	55
38 NC	LMP2	37	(France) Paul Belmondo Racing	(France) Didier André (France) Jean-Bernard Bouvet	Ford (Mecachrome) 3.4L V8	P	55
39 NC	GT2	80	(Germany) Farnbacher Racing	(Denmark) Lars Erik Nielsen (Germany) Marco Seefried (United States) Ian Baas	Porsche 911 GT3-RSR	Y	34
39 NC	GT2	80	(Germany) Farnbacher Racing	(Denmark) Lars Erik Nielsen (Germany) Marco Seefried (United States) Ian Baas	Porsche 3.6L Flat-6	Y	34
40 NC	LMP2	28	(Italy) Randaccio Ranieri SRL	(Italy) Randaccio Ranieri (Italy) Fabio Mancini (Italy) Gianni Collini	Lucchini LMP2	D	19
40 NC	LMP2	28	(Italy) Randaccio Ranieri SRL	(Italy) Randaccio Ranieri (Italy) Fabio Mancini (Italy) Gianni Collini	Judd XV675 3.4L V8	D	19
41 DNF	GT2	75	(France) Perspective Automobiles (France) Thierry Perrier	(France) Philippe Hesnault (France) Anthony Beltoise (United Kingdom) Nigel Smith	Porsche 911 GT3-RSR	D	101
41 DNF	GT2	75	(France) Perspective Automobiles (France) Thierry Perrier	(France) Philippe Hesnault (France) Anthony Beltoise (United Kingdom) Nigel Smith	Porsche 3.6L Flat-6	D	101
42 DNF	LMP2	36	(France) Paul Belmondo Racing	(Saudi Arabia) Karim Ojjeh (France) Pierre Ragues	Courage C65	P	63
42 DNF	LMP2	36	(France) Paul Belmondo Racing	(Saudi Arabia) Karim Ojjeh (France) Pierre Ragues	Ford (Mecachrome) 3.4L V8	P	63
43 DNF	GT1	70	(Belgium) PSI Experience	(Belgium) Jos Menten (Finland) Pertti Kuismanen (Finland) Markus Palttala	Chevrolet Corvette C6.R	D	61
43 DNF	GT1	70	(Belgium) PSI Experience	(Belgium) Jos Menten (Finland) Pertti Kuismanen (Finland) Markus Palttala	Chevrolet LS7R 7.0L V8	D	61
44 DNF	GT1	63	(United Kingdom) Team Modena	(United Kingdom) Peter Hardman (Netherlands) Christian Vann (Spain) Antonio García	Aston Martin DBR9	MI	58
44 DNF	GT1	63	(United Kingdom) Team Modena	(United Kingdom) Peter Hardman (Netherlands) Christian Vann (Spain) Antonio García	Aston Martin 6.0L V12	MI	58

== Statistics ==
- Pole Position - #9 Creation Autosportif - 1:44.850
- Fastest Lap - #12 Courage Compétition - 1:47.247
- Average Speed - 161.621 km/h

Le Mans Series
Previous race: 2006 1000 km of Spa	2006 season	Next race: 2006 1000 km of Donington
