= 2006 1000 km of Spa =

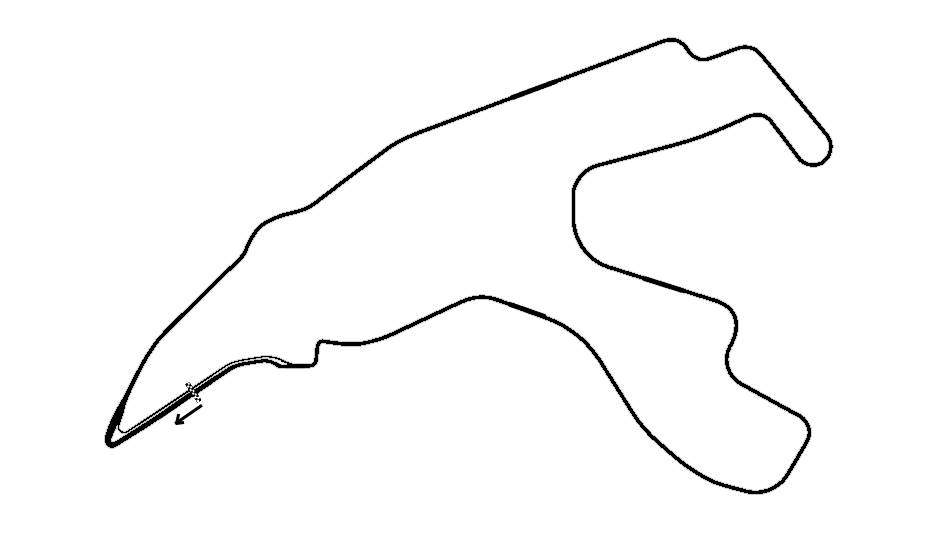
Layout of the Circuit de Spa-Francorchamps (2004–2006)

The 2006 1000km of Spa was the second automobile endurance race for Le Mans Prototype and Le Mans Grand Touring cars of the 2006 Le Mans Series season run by the ACO. It was run on May 14, 2006, at the Circuit de Spa-Francorchamps in Belgium.

== Qualifying ==
Pole position winners in each class are marked in bold.

Pos	Class	No.	Team	Driver	Time	Gap	Grid
1	**LMP1**	**5**	**(Switzerland) Swiss Spirit**	**(Switzerland) Marcel Fässler**	**2:19.538**	—	1
2	LMP1	2	(United Kingdom) Zytek Engineering	(Denmark) Casper Elgaard	2:21.641	+2.103	2
3	LMP1	17	(France) Pescarolo Sport	(France) Jean-Christophe Boullion	2:22.254	+2.716	3
4	**LMP2**	**25**	**(United Kingdom) Ray Mallock Ltd. (RML)**	**(Brazil) Thomas Erdos**	2:22.435	+2.897	4
5	LMP1	12	(France) Courage Compétition	(France) Jean-Marc Gounon	2:22.674	+3.136	5
6	LMP1	19	(United Kingdom) Chamberlain-Synergy Motorsport	(United Kingdom) Bob Berridge	2:23.289	+3.751	6
7	LMP2	24	(United States) Binnie Motorsports	(United Kingdom) Sam Hancock	2:23.707	+4.169	7
8	LMP2	32	(France) Barazi-Epsilon	(Netherlands) Michael Vergers	2:23.951	+4.413	8
9	LMP1	13	(France) Courage Compétition	(Japan) Haruki Kurosawa	2:24.953	+5.415	9
10	LMP2	39	(United Kingdom) Chamberlain-Synergy Motorsport		2:25.918	+6.380	10
11	**GT1**	**61**	**(United Kingdom) Cirtek Motorsport (United Kingdom) Team Modena**	**(Spain) Antonio García**	**2:26.813**	**+7.275**	11
12	GT1	55	(France) Team Oreca	(Monaco) Stéphane Ortelli	2:27.541	+8.003	12
13	LMP2	37	(France) Paul Belmondo Racing	(France) Didier André	2:27.836	+8.298	13
14	LMP2	22	(United Kingdom) Rollcentre Racing	(United Kingdom) Martin Short	2:28.176	+8.638	14
15	GT1	72	(France) Luc Alphand Aventures		2:28.738	+9.200	15
16	**GT2**	**92**	**(France) IMSA Performance Matmut**	**(France) Christophe Bouchut**	**2:30.262**	**+10.724**	16
17	LMP2	20	(France) Pierre Bruneau	(France) Marc Rostan	2:30.998	+11.460	17
18	LMP2	28	(Italy) Ranieri Randaccio	(Italy) Fabio Macini	2:31.125	+11.587	18
19	GT1	62	(United Kingdom) Cirtek Motorsport (United Kingdom) Team Modena	(United Kingdom) Peter Hardman	2:31.245	+11.707	19
20	GT1	67	(Russia) Convers MenX Team	(Netherlands) Peter Kox	2:31.342	+11.804	20
21	LMP1	15	(United Kingdom) ProTran Competition	(United Kingdom) Kevin McGarrity	2:31.606	+12.068	21
22	LMP2	36	(France) Paul Belmondo Racing		2:31.627	+12.089	22
23	LMP2	35	(Belgium) G-Force Racing	(Belgium) Stéphane Lemeret	2:32.078	+12.540	23
24	GT1	70	(Belgium) PSI Experience	(Finland) Markus Palttala	2:32.112	+12.574	24
25	GT2	77	(Germany) Seikel Motorsport	(Germany) Tim Bergmeister	2:33.668	+14.130	25
26	GT2	99	(United Kingdom) Virgo Motorsport	(United Kingdom) Tim Sugden	2:33.812	+14.274	26
27	GT2	97	(Italy) GPC Sport	(Italy) Fabrizio de Simone	2:34.365	+14.827	27
28	GT2	76	(Italy) Autorlando Sport	(Germany) Marc Lieb	2:34.596	+15.058	28
29	GT1	51	(Germany) B-Racing RS Line Team		2:35.150	+15.612	29
30	GT2	82	(United Kingdom) Team LNT		2:35.494	+15.956	30
31	GT2	81	(United Kingdom) Team LNT		2:35.549	+16.011	31
32	LMP2	44	(Germany) Kruse Motorsport		2:36.929	+17.391	32
33	GT2	78	(Italy) Autorlando Sport		2:37.112	+17.574	33
34	GT2	85	(Netherlands) Spyker Squadron b.v.		2:37.867	+18.329	34
35	GT2	86	(Netherlands) Spyker Squadron b.v.		2:38.447	+18.909	35
36	GT2	73	(Belgium) Ice Pol Racing Team		2:39.242	+19.704	36
37	GT2	96	(United Kingdom) James Watt Automotive		2:39.776	+20.238	37
38	GT2	90	(Germany) Farnbacher Racing		2:39.912	+20.374	38
39	GT2	80	(Germany) Farnbacher Racing		2:40.668	+21.130	39
40	GT2	75	(France) Perspective Automobiles (France) Thierry Perrier		2:42.268	+22.730	40
41	GT2	91	(Japan) T2M Motorsport		2:43.496	+23.958	41
42	GT2	84	(Italy) GPC Sport (Spain) Team Icer Brakes		2:46.359	+26.821	42
43	GT2	95	(United Kingdom) Racesport Peninsula TVR		4:25.305		43
44	LMP1	6	(United Kingdom) Lister Storm Racing		No time		44
45	GT1	50	(France) Aston Martin Racing Larbre		No time		45
WD	LMP1	9	(United Kingdom) Creation Autosportif		Withdrew		WD
WD	GT1	71	(Belgium) PSI Experience		Withdrew		WD
WD	GT2	98	(France) Noel del Bello Racing		Withdrew		WD

== Official results ==
Class winners in bold. Cars failing to complete 70% of winner's distance marked as Not Classified (NC).

Pos	Class	No	Team	Drivers	Chassis	Tyre	Laps
Pos	Class	No	Team	Drivers	Engine	Tyre	Laps
1	**LMP1**	**17**	**(France) Pescarolo Sport**	**(France) Emmanuel Collard (France) Jean-Christophe Boullion**	**Pescarolo C60 Hybrid**	MI	**134**
1	**LMP1**	**17**	**(France) Pescarolo Sport**	**(France) Emmanuel Collard (France) Jean-Christophe Boullion**	**Judd GV5 S2 5.0L V10**	MI	**134**
2	LMP1	5	(Switzerland) Swiss Spirit	(Switzerland) Harold Primat (Switzerland) Marcel Fässler	Courage LC70	MI	133
2	LMP1	5	(Switzerland) Swiss Spirit	(Switzerland) Harold Primat (Switzerland) Marcel Fässler	Judd GV5 S2 5.0L V10	MI	133
3	LMP1	2	(United Kingdom) Zytek Engineering	(Denmark) John Nielsen (Denmark) Casper Elgaard (Denmark) Philip Andersen	Zytek 06S	MI	132
3	LMP1	2	(United Kingdom) Zytek Engineering	(Denmark) John Nielsen (Denmark) Casper Elgaard (Denmark) Philip Andersen	Zytek 2ZG408 4.0L V8	MI	132
4	**LMP2**	**39**	**(United Kingdom) Chamberlain-Synergy Motorsport; ASM Team Racing for Portugal**	**(Spain) Miguel Angel Castro (Spain) Ángel Burgueño (Portugal) Miguel Amaral**	**Lola B05/40**	D	**132**
4	**LMP2**	**39**	**(United Kingdom) Chamberlain-Synergy Motorsport; ASM Team Racing for Portugal**	**(Spain) Miguel Angel Castro (Spain) Ángel Burgueño (Portugal) Miguel Amaral**	**AER P07 2.0L Turbo I4**	D	**132**
5	LMP2	25	(United Kingdom) Ray Mallock Ltd. (RML)	(Brazil) Thomas Erdos (United Kingdom) Mike Newton	MG-Lola EX264	MI	131
5	LMP2	25	(United Kingdom) Ray Mallock Ltd. (RML)	(Brazil) Thomas Erdos (United Kingdom) Mike Newton	AER P07 2.0L Turbo I4	MI	131
6	LMP2	24	(United States) Binnie Motorsports	(United States) William Binnie (United Kingdom) Allen Timpany (United Kingdom) Sam Hancock	Lola B05/42	MI	129
6	LMP2	24	(United States) Binnie Motorsports	(United States) William Binnie (United Kingdom) Allen Timpany (United Kingdom) Sam Hancock	Zytek ZG348 3.4L V8	MI	129
7	**GT1**	**55**	**(France) Team Oreca**	**(Monaco) Stéphane Ortelli (France) Soheil Ayari**	**Saleen S7-R**	MI	**129**
7	**GT1**	**55**	**(France) Team Oreca**	**(Monaco) Stéphane Ortelli (France) Soheil Ayari**	**Ford 7.0L V8**	MI	**129**
8	LMP2	32	(France) Barazi-Epsilon	(Netherlands) Michael Vergers (Denmark) Juan Barazi (Italy) Davide Valsecchi	Courage C65	MI	128
8	LMP2	32	(France) Barazi-Epsilon	(Netherlands) Michael Vergers (Denmark) Juan Barazi (Italy) Davide Valsecchi	AER P07 2.0L Turbo I4	MI	128
9	GT1	61	(United Kingdom) Cirtek Motorsport (United Kingdom) Team Modena	(Spain) Antonio Garcia (United Kingdom) Richard Lyons	Aston Martin DBR9	MI	128
9	GT1	61	(United Kingdom) Cirtek Motorsport (United Kingdom) Team Modena	(Spain) Antonio Garcia (United Kingdom) Richard Lyons	Aston Martin 6.0L V12	MI	128
10	GT1	70	(Belgium) PSI Experience	(Finland) Pertti Kuismanen (Finland) Markus Palttala (Netherlands) Jos Menten	Chevrolet Corvette C6.R	D	126
10	GT1	70	(Belgium) PSI Experience	(Finland) Pertti Kuismanen (Finland) Markus Palttala (Netherlands) Jos Menten	Chevrolet LS7R 7.0L V8	D	126
11	GT1	62	(United Kingdom) Cirtek Motorsport (United Kingdom) Team Modena	(United Kingdom) Peter Hardman (United Kingdom) Christian Vann (United Kingdom) Jamie Campbell-Walter	Aston Martin DBR9	MI	126
11	GT1	62	(United Kingdom) Cirtek Motorsport (United Kingdom) Team Modena	(United Kingdom) Peter Hardman (United Kingdom) Christian Vann (United Kingdom) Jamie Campbell-Walter	Aston Martin 6.0L V12	MI	126
12	GT1	67	(Russia) Convers MenX Team	(Netherlands) Peter Kox (Czech Republic) Robert Pergl (Russia) Alexey Vasilyev	Ferrari 550-GTS Maranello	MI	126
12	GT1	67	(Russia) Convers MenX Team	(Netherlands) Peter Kox (Czech Republic) Robert Pergl (Russia) Alexey Vasilyev	Ferrari F131 6.0L V12	MI	126
13	GT1	72	(France) Luc Alphand Aventures	(France) Jérôme Policand (France) Patrice Goueslard (France) Anthony Beltoise	Chevrolet Corvette C5-R	MI	126
13	GT1	72	(France) Luc Alphand Aventures	(France) Jérôme Policand (France) Patrice Goueslard (France) Anthony Beltoise	Chevrolet LS7R 7.0L V8	MI	126
14	LMP2	36	(France) Paul Belmondo Racing	(France) Claude-Yves Gosselin (France) Pierre Ragues (Saudi Arabia) Karim Ojjeh	Courage C65	P	123
14	LMP2	36	(France) Paul Belmondo Racing	(France) Claude-Yves Gosselin (France) Pierre Ragues (Saudi Arabia) Karim Ojjeh	Ford (Mecachrome) 3.4L V8	P	123
15	**GT2**	**76**	**(Italy) Autorlando Sport**	**(Germany) Marc Lieb (Switzerland) Joël Camathias**	**Porsche 911 GT3-RSR**	P	**123**
15	**GT2**	**76**	**(Italy) Autorlando Sport**	**(Germany) Marc Lieb (Switzerland) Joël Camathias**	**Porsche 3.6L Flat-6**	P	**123**
16	GT2	82	(United Kingdom) Team LNT	(United Kingdom) Lawrence Tomlinson (United Kingdom) Richard Dean (United Kingdom) Tom Kimber-Smith	Panoz Esperante GT-LM	P	122
16	GT2	82	(United Kingdom) Team LNT	(United Kingdom) Lawrence Tomlinson (United Kingdom) Richard Dean (United Kingdom) Tom Kimber-Smith	Ford (Élan) 5.0L V8	P	122
17	GT2	99	(United Kingdom) Virgo Motorsport	(United Kingdom) Dan Eagling (United Kingdom) Tim Sugden	Ferrari F430GT	D	122
17	GT2	99	(United Kingdom) Virgo Motorsport	(United Kingdom) Dan Eagling (United Kingdom) Tim Sugden	Ferrari 4.0L V8	D	122
18	GT2	80	(Germany) Farnbacher Racing	(Denmark) Lars Erik Nielsen (Germany) Marco Seefried	Porsche 911 GT3-RSR	D	122
18	GT2	80	(Germany) Farnbacher Racing	(Denmark) Lars Erik Nielsen (Germany) Marco Seefried	Porsche 3.6L Flat-6	D	122
19	GT2	92	(France) IMSA Performance Matmut	(France) Christophe Bouchut (France) Raymond Narac	Porsche 911 GT3-RSR	D	121
19	GT2	92	(France) IMSA Performance Matmut	(France) Christophe Bouchut (France) Raymond Narac	Porsche 3.6L Flat-6	D	121
20	GT2	75	(France) Perspective Automobiles (France) Thierry Perrier	(France) Philippe Hesnault (United Kingdom) Nigel Smith (Portugal) João Barbosa	Porsche 911 GT3-RSR	D	119
20	GT2	75	(France) Perspective Automobiles (France) Thierry Perrier	(France) Philippe Hesnault (United Kingdom) Nigel Smith (Portugal) João Barbosa	Porsche 3.6L Flat-6	D	119
21	GT2	77	(Germany) Seikel Motorsport	(Canada) Tony Burgess (United States) Philip Collin (Germany) Tim Bergmeister	Porsche 911 GT3-RSR	Y	118
21	GT2	77	(Germany) Seikel Motorsport	(Canada) Tony Burgess (United States) Philip Collin (Germany) Tim Bergmeister	Porsche 3.6L Flat-6	Y	118
22	GT2	73	(Belgium) Ice Pol Racing Team	(Belgium) Yves-Emmanuel Lambert (Belgium) Christian Lefort (France) Romain Iannetta	Porsche 911 GT3-RSR	D	114
22	GT2	73	(Belgium) Ice Pol Racing Team	(Belgium) Yves-Emmanuel Lambert (Belgium) Christian Lefort (France) Romain Iannetta	Porsche 3.6L Flat-6	D	114
23	GT2	95	(United Kingdom) Racesport Peninsula TVR	(United Kingdom) John Hartshorne (United Kingdom) Iain Dockerill	TVR Tuscan T400R	D	111
23	GT2	95	(United Kingdom) Racesport Peninsula TVR	(United Kingdom) John Hartshorne (United Kingdom) Iain Dockerill	TVR Speed Six 4.0L I6	D	111
24	GT2	85	(Netherlands) Spyker Squadron b.v.	(Netherlands) Jeroen Bleekemolen (Netherlands) Mike Hezemans	Spyker C8 Spyder GT2-R	D	111
24	GT2	85	(Netherlands) Spyker Squadron b.v.	(Netherlands) Jeroen Bleekemolen (Netherlands) Mike Hezemans	Audi 3.8L V8	D	111
25	GT2	96	(United Kingdom) James Watt Automotive	(United Kingdom) Paul Daniels (Australia) Jack Elsegood (France) Xavier Pompidou	Porsche 911 GT3-RSR	D	96
25	GT2	96	(United Kingdom) James Watt Automotive	(United Kingdom) Paul Daniels (Australia) Jack Elsegood (France) Xavier Pompidou	Porsche 3.6L Flat-6	D	96
26 NC	LMP2	20	(France) Pierre Bruneau	(France) Marc Rostan (France) Pierre Bruneau	Pilbeam MP93	MI	79
26 NC	LMP2	20	(France) Pierre Bruneau	(France) Marc Rostan (France) Pierre Bruneau	Judd XV675 3.4L V8	MI	79
27 NC	GT1	50	(France) Aston Martin Racing Larbre	(Portugal) Pedro Lamy (Switzerland) Gabriele Gardel (Belgium) Vincent Vosse	Aston Martin DBR9	MI	58
27 NC	GT1	50	(France) Aston Martin Racing Larbre	(Portugal) Pedro Lamy (Switzerland) Gabriele Gardel (Belgium) Vincent Vosse	Aston Martin 6.0L V12	MI	58
28 NC	LMP1	12	(France) Courage Compétition	(France) Jean-Marc Gounon (Switzerland) Alexander Frei	Courage LC70	Y	47
28 NC	LMP1	12	(France) Courage Compétition	(France) Jean-Marc Gounon (Switzerland) Alexander Frei	Mugen MF458S 4.5L V8	Y	47
29 NC	LMP2	37	(France) Paul Belmondo Racing	(France) Didier André (France) Yann Clairay	Courage C65	P	28
29 NC	LMP2	37	(France) Paul Belmondo Racing	(France) Didier André (France) Yann Clairay	Ford (Mecachrome) 3.4L V8	P	28
30 DNF	GT2	90	(Germany) Farnbacher Racing	(Germany) Pierre Ehret (Germany) Dominik Farnbacher	Porsche 911 GT3-RSR	D	86
30 DNF	GT2	90	(Germany) Farnbacher Racing	(Germany) Pierre Ehret (Germany) Dominik Farnbacher	Porsche 3.6L Flat-6	D	86
31 DNF	GT2	91	(Japan) T2M Motorsport	(Slovakia) Miro Konôpka (Japan) Yutaka Yamagishi (Thailand) Tor Graves	Porsche 911 GT3-RS	D	80
31 DNF	GT2	91	(Japan) T2M Motorsport	(Slovakia) Miro Konôpka (Japan) Yutaka Yamagishi (Thailand) Tor Graves	Porsche 3.6L Flat-6	D	80
32 DNF	LMP2	28	(Italy) Ranieri Randaccio SRL	(Italy) Ranieri Randaccio (Italy) Fabio Macini (Italy) Gianni Collini	Lucchini LMP2/04	D	74
32 DNF	LMP2	28	(Italy) Ranieri Randaccio SRL	(Italy) Ranieri Randaccio (Italy) Fabio Macini (Italy) Gianni Collini	Judd XV675 3.4L V8	D	74
33 DNF	LMP2	22	(United Kingdom) Rollcentre Racing	(United Kingdom) Martin Short (United Kingdom) Tim Greaves (United Kingdom) Gregor Fisken	Radical SR9	D	67
33 DNF	LMP2	22	(United Kingdom) Rollcentre Racing	(United Kingdom) Martin Short (United Kingdom) Tim Greaves (United Kingdom) Gregor Fisken	Judd XV675 3.4L V8	D	67
34 DNF	LMP1	13	(France) Courage Compétition	(Japan) Shinji Nakano (Japan) Haruki Kurosawa	Courage LC70	Y	53
34 DNF	LMP1	13	(France) Courage Compétition	(Japan) Shinji Nakano (Japan) Haruki Kurosawa	Mugen MF458S 4.5L V8	Y	53
35 DNF	GT2	81	(United Kingdom) Team LNT	(United Kingdom) Warren Hughes (United Kingdom) Robert Bell	Panoz Esperante GT-LM	P	49
35 DNF	GT2	81	(United Kingdom) Team LNT	(United Kingdom) Warren Hughes (United Kingdom) Robert Bell	Ford (Élan) 5.0L V8	P	49
36 DNF	GT2	97	(Italy) GPC Sport	(Italy) Luca Drudi (Italy) Gabrio Rosa (Italy) Fabrizio de Simone	Ferrari F430GT	P	49
36 DNF	GT2	97	(Italy) GPC Sport	(Italy) Luca Drudi (Italy) Gabrio Rosa (Italy) Fabrizio de Simone	Ferrari 4.0L V8	P	49
37 DNF	LMP1	6	(United Kingdom) Lister Storm Racing	(Denmark) Nicolas Kiesa (Denmark) Jens Møller	Lister Storm LMP	D	42
37 DNF	LMP1	6	(United Kingdom) Lister Storm Racing	(Denmark) Nicolas Kiesa (Denmark) Jens Møller	Chevrolet 6.0L V8	D	42
38 DNF	GT2	86	(Netherlands) Spyker Squadron b.v.	(United Kingdom) Jonny Kane (Netherlands) Donny Crevels	Spyker C8 Spyder GT2-R	D	26
38 DNF	GT2	86	(Netherlands) Spyker Squadron b.v.	(United Kingdom) Jonny Kane (Netherlands) Donny Crevels	Audi 3.8L V8	D	26
39 DNF	LMP1	19	(United Kingdom) Chamberlain-Synergy Motorsport	(United Kingdom) Bob Berridge (United Kingdom) Gareth Evans (United Kingdom) Peter Owen	Lola B06/10	D	3
39 DNF	LMP1	19	(United Kingdom) Chamberlain-Synergy Motorsport	(United Kingdom) Bob Berridge (United Kingdom) Gareth Evans (United Kingdom) Peter Owen	AER P32T 3.6L Turbo V8	D	3
40 DNF	GT1	51	(Germany) B-Racing RS Line Team	(Switzerland) Benjamin Leuenberger (Germany) Norbert Walchhofer (United Kingdom) Marino Franchitti	Lamborghini Murciélago R-GT	D	1
40 DNF	GT1	51	(Germany) B-Racing RS Line Team	(Switzerland) Benjamin Leuenberger (Germany) Norbert Walchhofer (United Kingdom) Marino Franchitti	Lamborghini L535 6.0L V12	D	1

== Statistics ==
- Pole Position - #5 Swiss Spirit - 2:19.538
- Fastest Lap - #17 Pescarolo Sport - 2:06.687
- Average Speed - 115.112 km/h

Le Mans Series
Previous race: 2006 1000 km of Istanbul	2006 season	Next race: 2006 1000 km of Nürburgring
