= 2006 1000 km of Donington =

Layout of the Donington Park

The 2006 1000 km of Donington was the fourth race of the 2006 Le Mans Series season run by the ACO. It was run on 27 August 2006

== Official results ==
Class winners in bold. Cars failing to complete 70% of winner's distance marked as Not Classified (NC).

| Pos | Class | No | Team | Drivers | Chassis | Tyre | Laps |
| Pos | Class | No | Team | Drivers | Engine | Tyre | Laps |
|---|---|---|---|---|---|---|---|
| 1 | **LMP1** | **17** | **(France) Pescarolo Sport** | **(France) Emmanuel Collard (France) Jean-Christophe Boullion (France) Didier André** | **Pescarolo C60 Hybrid** | MI | **249** |
| 1 | **LMP1** | **17** | **(France) Pescarolo Sport** | **(France) Emmanuel Collard (France) Jean-Christophe Boullion (France) Didier André** | **Judd GV5 S2 5.0L V10** | MI | **249** |
| 2 | LMP1 | 10 | (United Kingdom) Creation Autosportif | (France) Nicolas Minassian (United Kingdom) Kevin McGarrity | Creation CA06/H | MI | 247 |
| 2 | LMP1 | 10 | (United Kingdom) Creation Autosportif | (France) Nicolas Minassian (United Kingdom) Kevin McGarrity | Judd GV5 S2 5.0L V10 | MI | 247 |
| 3 | LMP1 | 9 | (United Kingdom) Creation Autosportif | (United Kingdom) Jamie Campbell-Walter (Switzerland) Felipe Ortiz (Italy) Beppe Gabbiani | Creation CA06/H | MI | 245 |
| 3 | LMP1 | 9 | (United Kingdom) Creation Autosportif | (United Kingdom) Jamie Campbell-Walter (Switzerland) Felipe Ortiz (Italy) Beppe Gabbiani | Judd GV5 S2 5.0L V10 | MI | 245 |
| 4 | **LMP2** | **25** | **(United Kingdom) Ray Mallock Ltd. (RML)** | **(United Kingdom) Mike Newton (Brazil) Thomas Erdos** | **MG-Lola EX264** | MI | **239** |
| 4 | **LMP2** | **25** | **(United Kingdom) Ray Mallock Ltd. (RML)** | **(United Kingdom) Mike Newton (Brazil) Thomas Erdos** | **AER P07 2.0L Turbo I4** | MI | **239** |
| 5 | LMP1 | 12 | (France) Courage Compétition | (France) Jean-Marc Gounon (United Kingdom) Gregor Fisken (Switzerland) Alexander Frei | Courage LC70 | Y | 238 |
| 5 | LMP1 | 12 | (France) Courage Compétition | (France) Jean-Marc Gounon (United Kingdom) Gregor Fisken (Switzerland) Alexander Frei | Mugen MF458S 4.5L V8 | Y | 238 |
| 6 | **GT1** | **63** | **(United Kingdom) Team Modena** | **(Spain) Antonio Garcia (United Kingdom) Peter Hardman** | **Aston Martin DBR9** | MI | **233** |
| 6 | **GT1** | **63** | **(United Kingdom) Team Modena** | **(Spain) Antonio Garcia (United Kingdom) Peter Hardman** | **Aston Martin 6.0L V12** | MI | **233** |
| 7 | GT1 | 72 | (France) Luc Alphand Aventures | (France) Jérôme Policand (France) Patrice Goueslard (France) Luc Alphand | Chevrolet Corvette C5-R | MI | 233 |
| 7 | GT1 | 72 | (France) Luc Alphand Aventures | (France) Jérôme Policand (France) Patrice Goueslard (France) Luc Alphand | Chevrolet LS7R 7.0L V8 | MI | 233 |
| 8 | GT1 | 67 | (Russia) Convers MenX Team | (Netherlands) Peter Kox (Czech Republic) Robert Pergl (Russia) Alexey Vasilyev | Ferrari 550-GTS Maranello | MI | 231 |
| 8 | GT1 | 67 | (Russia) Convers MenX Team | (Netherlands) Peter Kox (Czech Republic) Robert Pergl (Russia) Alexey Vasilyev | Ferrari F131 6.0L V12 | MI | 231 |
| 9 | GT1 | 70 | (Belgium) PSI Experience | (Netherlands) Jos Menten (Finland) Pertti Kuismanen (Finland) Markus Palttala | Chevrolet Corvette C6.R | D | 228 |
| 9 | GT1 | 70 | (Belgium) PSI Experience | (Netherlands) Jos Menten (Finland) Pertti Kuismanen (Finland) Markus Palttala | Chevrolet LS7R 7.0L V8 | D | 228 |
| 10 | LMP2 | 20 | (France) Pierre Bruneau | (France) Marc Rostan (France) Pierre Bruneau | Pilbeam MP93 | MI | 227 |
| 10 | LMP2 | 20 | (France) Pierre Bruneau | (France) Marc Rostan (France) Pierre Bruneau | Judd XV675 3.4L V8 | MI | 227 |
| 11 | **GT2** | **81** | **(United Kingdom) Team LNT** | **(United Kingdom) Warren Hughes (United Kingdom) Rob Bell** | **Panoz Esperante GT-LM** | P | **224** |
| 11 | **GT2** | **81** | **(United Kingdom) Team LNT** | **(United Kingdom) Warren Hughes (United Kingdom) Rob Bell** | **Ford (Élan) 5.0L V8** | P | **224** |
| 12 | GT2 | 76 | (Italy) Autorlando Sport | (Germany) Marc Lieb (Switzerland) Joël Camathias | Porsche 911 GT3-RSR | P | 223 |
| 12 | GT2 | 76 | (Italy) Autorlando Sport | (Germany) Marc Lieb (Switzerland) Joël Camathias | Porsche 3.6L Flat-6 | P | 223 |
| 13 | LMP2 | 24 | (United States) Binnie Motorsports | (United States) William Binnie (United Kingdom) Allen Timpany (United Kingdom) Sam Hancock | Lola B05/42 | MI | 221 |
| 13 | LMP2 | 24 | (United States) Binnie Motorsports | (United States) William Binnie (United Kingdom) Allen Timpany (United Kingdom) Sam Hancock | Zytek ZG348 3.4L V8 | MI | 221 |
| 14 | GT2 | 97 | (Italy) GPC Sport | (Italy) Luca Drudi (Italy) Gabrio Rosa (Italy) Andrea Montermini | Ferrari F430GT | P | 221 |
| 14 | GT2 | 97 | (Italy) GPC Sport | (Italy) Luca Drudi (Italy) Gabrio Rosa (Italy) Andrea Montermini | Ferrari 4.0L V8 | P | 221 |
| 15 | GT2 | 90 | (Germany) Farnbacher Racing | (Germany) Pierre Ehret (Germany) Dominik Farnbacher (Germany) Marco Seefried | Porsche 911 GT3-RSR | Y | 219 |
| 15 | GT2 | 90 | (Germany) Farnbacher Racing | (Germany) Pierre Ehret (Germany) Dominik Farnbacher (Germany) Marco Seefried | Porsche 3.6L Flat-6 | Y | 219 |
| 16 | GT2 | 92 | (France) IMSA Performance Matmut | (France) Christophe Bouchut (France) Raymond Narac | Porsche 911 GT3-RSR | D | 209 |
| 16 | GT2 | 92 | (France) IMSA Performance Matmut | (France) Christophe Bouchut (France) Raymond Narac | Porsche 3.6L Flat-6 | D | 209 |
| 17 | GT2 | 99 | (United Kingdom) Virgo Motorsport | (United Kingdom) Dan Eagling (United Kingdom) Tim Sugden | Ferrari F430GT | D | 206 |
| 17 | GT2 | 99 | (United Kingdom) Virgo Motorsport | (United Kingdom) Dan Eagling (United Kingdom) Tim Sugden | Ferrari 4.0L V8 | D | 206 |
| 18 | GT2 | 75 | (France) Perspective Automobiles | (France) Philippe Hesnault (France) Anthony Beltoise (United Kingdom) Nigel Smith | Porsche 911 GT3-RSR | D | 202 |
| 18 | GT2 | 75 | (France) Perspective Automobiles | (France) Philippe Hesnault (France) Anthony Beltoise (United Kingdom) Nigel Smith | Porsche 3.6L Flat-6 | D | 202 |
| 19 | LMP2 | 32 | (France) Barazi-Epsilon | (Netherlands) Michael Vergers (Denmark) Juan Barazi (Italy) Davide Valsecchi | Courage C65 | MI | 201 |
| 19 | LMP2 | 32 | (France) Barazi-Epsilon | (Netherlands) Michael Vergers (Denmark) Juan Barazi (Italy) Davide Valsecchi | AER P07 2.0L Turbo I4 | MI | 201 |
| 20 | GT1 | 50 | (France) Aston Martin Racing Larbre | (Portugal) Pedro Lamy (Switzerland) Gabriele Gardel (Belgium) Vincent Vosse | Aston Martin DBR9 | MI | 195 |
| 20 | GT1 | 50 | (France) Aston Martin Racing Larbre | (Portugal) Pedro Lamy (Switzerland) Gabriele Gardel (Belgium) Vincent Vosse | Aston Martin 6.0L V12 | MI | 195 |
| 21 | LMP1 | 19 | (United Kingdom) Chamberlain-Synergy Motorsport | (United Kingdom) Bob Berridge (United Kingdom) Gareth Evans (United Kingdom) Peter Owen | Lola B06/10 | D | 195 |
| 21 | LMP1 | 19 | (United Kingdom) Chamberlain-Synergy Motorsport | (United Kingdom) Bob Berridge (United Kingdom) Gareth Evans (United Kingdom) Peter Owen | AER P32T 3.6L Turbo V8 | D | 195 |
| 22 | LMP2 | 44 | (Germany) Kruse Motorsport | (Germany) Jan-Dirk Leuders (Germany) Jens Petersen (Canada) Tony Burgess | Courage C65 | KU | 181 |
| 22 | LMP2 | 44 | (Germany) Kruse Motorsport | (Germany) Jan-Dirk Leuders (Germany) Jens Petersen (Canada) Tony Burgess | Judd XV675 3.4L V8 | KU | 181 |
| 23 NC | LMP1 | 13 | (France) Courage Compétition | (Japan) Shinji Nakano (Japan) Haruki Kurosawa | Courage LC70 | Y | 172 |
| 23 NC | LMP1 | 13 | (France) Courage Compétition | (Japan) Shinji Nakano (Japan) Haruki Kurosawa | Mugen MF458S 4.5L V8 | Y | 172 |
| 24 DNF | LMP2 | 22 | (United Kingdom) Rollcentre Racing | (Portugal) João Barbosa (United Kingdom) Martin Short (United Kingdom) Rob Barff | Radical SR9 | D | 233 |
| 24 DNF | LMP2 | 22 | (United Kingdom) Rollcentre Racing | (Portugal) João Barbosa (United Kingdom) Martin Short (United Kingdom) Rob Barff | Judd XV675 3.4L V8 | D | 233 |
| 25 DNF | LMP2 | 36 | (France) Paul Belmondo Racing | (France) Claude-Yves Gosselin (France) Pierre Ragues (Saudi Arabia) Karim Ojjeh | Courage C65 | P | 202 |
| 25 DNF | LMP2 | 36 | (France) Paul Belmondo Racing | (France) Claude-Yves Gosselin (France) Pierre Ragues (Saudi Arabia) Karim Ojjeh | Ford (Mecachrome) 3.4L V8 | P | 202 |
| 26 DNF | LMP1 | 15 | (United Kingdom) ProTran Competition | (United Kingdom) Phil Bennett (United Kingdom) Paul Cope | ProTran RS06/H | D | 188 |
| 26 DNF | LMP1 | 15 | (United Kingdom) ProTran Competition | (United Kingdom) Phil Bennett (United Kingdom) Paul Cope | Judd GV5 S2 5.0L V10 | D | 188 |
| 27 DNF | LMP1 | 2 | (United Kingdom) Zytek Engineering | (Sweden) Stefan Johansson (Japan) Hideki Noda | Zytek 06S | MI | 183 |
| 27 DNF | LMP1 | 2 | (United Kingdom) Zytek Engineering | (Sweden) Stefan Johansson (Japan) Hideki Noda | Zytek 2ZG408 4.0L V8 | MI | 183 |
| 28 DNF | LMP2 | 21 | (United Kingdom) Team Bruichladdich Radical | (United Kingdom) Tim Greaves (United Kingdom) Stuart Moseley (United Kingdom) Ben Devlin | Radical SR9 | D | 151 |
| 28 DNF | LMP2 | 21 | (United Kingdom) Team Bruichladdich Radical | (United Kingdom) Tim Greaves (United Kingdom) Stuart Moseley (United Kingdom) Ben Devlin | AER P07 2.0L Turbo I4 | D | 151 |
| 29 DNF | GT1 | 55 | (France) Team Oreca | (Monaco) Stéphane Ortelli (France) Soheil Ayari | Saleen S7-R | MI | 111 |
| 29 DNF | GT1 | 55 | (France) Team Oreca | (Monaco) Stéphane Ortelli (France) Soheil Ayari | Ford 7.0L V8 | MI | 111 |
| 30 DNF | GT2 | 78 | (Italy) Autorlando Sport | (Denmark) Gunnar Kristensen (Denmark) Allan Simonsen | Porsche 911 GT3-RSR | P | 94 |
| 30 DNF | GT2 | 78 | (Italy) Autorlando Sport | (Denmark) Gunnar Kristensen (Denmark) Allan Simonsen | Porsche 3.6L Flat-6 | P | 94 |
| 31 DNF | GT2 | 83 | (Italy) GPC Sport | (Italy) Stefano Zonca (Italy) Andrea Belicchi (Italy) Marco Cioci | Ferrari F430GT | P | 89 |
| 31 DNF | GT2 | 83 | (Italy) GPC Sport | (Italy) Stefano Zonca (Italy) Andrea Belicchi (Italy) Marco Cioci | Ferrari 4.0L V8 | P | 89 |
| 32 DNF | GT2 | 85 | (Netherlands) Spyker Squadron b.v. | (Netherlands) Jeroen Bleekemolen (United Kingdom) Jonny Kane | Spyker C8 Spyder GT2-R | D | 81 |
| 32 DNF | GT2 | 85 | (Netherlands) Spyker Squadron b.v. | (Netherlands) Jeroen Bleekemolen (United Kingdom) Jonny Kane | Audi 3.8L V8 | D | 81 |
| 33 DNF | LMP1 | 5 | (Switzerland) Swiss Spirit | (Switzerland) Marcel Fässler (Switzerland) Harold Primat | Courage LC70 | MI | 79 |
| 33 DNF | LMP1 | 5 | (Switzerland) Swiss Spirit | (Switzerland) Marcel Fässler (Switzerland) Harold Primat | Judd GV5 S2 5.0L V10 | MI | 79 |
| 34 DNF | GT2 | 95 | (United Kingdom) Racesport Peninsula TVR | (United Kingdom) Iain Dockerill (United Kingdom) John Hartshorne | TVR Tuscan T400R | D | 76 |
| 34 DNF | GT2 | 95 | (United Kingdom) Racesport Peninsula TVR | (United Kingdom) Iain Dockerill (United Kingdom) John Hartshorne | TVR Speed Six 4.0L I6 | D | 76 |
| 35 DNF | LMP2 | 40 | ASM Team Racing for Portugal | (Portugal) Miguel Amaral (Spain) Miguel Angel Castro (Spain) Angel Burgueño | Lola B05/40 | D | 66 |
| 35 DNF | LMP2 | 40 | ASM Team Racing for Portugal | (Portugal) Miguel Amaral (Spain) Miguel Angel Castro (Spain) Angel Burgueño | AER P07 2.0L Turbo I4 | D | 66 |
| 36 DNF | LMP1 | 6 | (United Kingdom) Lister Storm Racing | (Denmark) Jens Møller (United Kingdom) Justin Keen | Lister Storm LMP | D | 56 |
| 36 DNF | LMP1 | 6 | (United Kingdom) Lister Storm Racing | (Denmark) Jens Møller (United Kingdom) Justin Keen | Chevrolet 6.0L V8 | D | 56 |
| 37 DNF | GT2 | 82 | (United Kingdom) Team LNT | (United Kingdom) Lawrence Tomlinson (United Kingdom) Richard Dean (United Kingdom) Marc Hynes | Panoz Esperante GT-LM | P | 55 |
| 37 DNF | GT2 | 82 | (United Kingdom) Team LNT | (United Kingdom) Lawrence Tomlinson (United Kingdom) Richard Dean (United Kingdom) Marc Hynes | Ford (Élan) 5.0L V8 | P | 55 |
| 38 DNF | GT2 | 96 | (United Kingdom) James Watt Automotive | (United Kingdom) Paul Daniels (Denmark) Bo McCormick (France) Xavier Pompidou | Porsche 911 GT3-RSR | D | 38 |
| 38 DNF | GT2 | 96 | (United Kingdom) James Watt Automotive | (United Kingdom) Paul Daniels (Denmark) Bo McCormick (France) Xavier Pompidou | Porsche 3.6L Flat-6 | D | 38 |
| 39 DNF | GT2 | 86 | (Netherlands) Spyker Squadron b.v. | (Netherlands) Tom Coronel (United Kingdom) Peter Dumbreck | Spyker C8 Spyder GT2-R | D | 20 |
| 39 DNF | GT2 | 86 | (Netherlands) Spyker Squadron b.v. | (Netherlands) Tom Coronel (United Kingdom) Peter Dumbreck | Audi 3.8L V8 | D | 20 |

== Statistics ==
- Pole Position – #12 Courage Compétition – 1:20.756
- Fastest Lap – #9 Creation Autosportif – 1:21.527
- Average Speed – 167.211 km/h

Le Mans Series
| Previous race: 2006 1000 km of Nürburgring | 2006 season | Next race: 2006 1000 km of Jarama |
