= 2006 1000 km of Jarama =

Layout of the Jarama circuit

The 2006 1000 km of Jarama was the fifth and final race of the 2006 Le Mans Series season run by the ACO. It was run on 24 September 2006.

This race was originally scheduled to be run at Monza, but had to be moved to Jarama due to a scheduling conflict at Monza.

== Official results ==
Class winners in bold. Cars failing to complete 70% of winner's distance marked as Not Classified (NC).

Pos	Class	No	Team	Drivers	Chassis	Tyre	Laps
Pos	Class	No	Team	Drivers	Engine	Tyre	Laps
1	**LMP1**	**17**	**(France) Pescarolo Sport**	**(France) Emmanuel Collard (France) Jean-Christophe Boullion (France) Didier André**	**Pescarolo C60 Hybrid**	MI	**237**
1	**LMP1**	**17**	**(France) Pescarolo Sport**	**(France) Emmanuel Collard (France) Jean-Christophe Boullion (France) Didier André**	**Judd GV5 S2 5.0L V10**	MI	**237**
2	**LMP2**	**40**	**ASM Team Racing for Portugal**	**(Portugal) Miguel Amaral (Spain) Miguel Angel Castro (Spain) Angel Burgueño**	**Lola B05/40**	D	**233**
2	**LMP2**	**40**	**ASM Team Racing for Portugal**	**(Portugal) Miguel Amaral (Spain) Miguel Angel Castro (Spain) Angel Burgueño**	**AER P07 2.0L Turbo I4**	D	**233**
3	LMP1	5	(Switzerland) Swiss Spirit	(Switzerland) Harold Primat (Switzerland) Marcel Fässler	Courage LC70	MI	232
3	LMP1	5	(Switzerland) Swiss Spirit	(Switzerland) Harold Primat (Switzerland) Marcel Fässler	Judd GV5 S2 5.0L V10	MI	232
4	LMP1	9	(United Kingdom) Creation Autosportif	(France) Nicolas Minassian (Switzerland) Felipe Ortiz (Italy) Beppe Gabbiani	Creation CA06/H	MI	230
4	LMP1	9	(United Kingdom) Creation Autosportif	(France) Nicolas Minassian (Switzerland) Felipe Ortiz (Italy) Beppe Gabbiani	Judd GV5 S2 5.0L V10	MI	230
5	LMP1	19	(United Kingdom) Chamberlain-Synergy Motorsport	(United Kingdom) Bob Berridge (United Kingdom) Gareth Evans (United Kingdom) Peter Owen	Lola B06/10	D	229
5	LMP1	19	(United Kingdom) Chamberlain-Synergy Motorsport	(United Kingdom) Bob Berridge (United Kingdom) Gareth Evans (United Kingdom) Peter Owen	AER P32T 3.6L Turbo V8	D	229
6	**GT1**	**55**	**(France) Team Oreca**	**(Monaco) Stéphane Ortelli (France) Soheil Ayari**	**Saleen S7-R**	MI	**226**
6	**GT1**	**55**	**(France) Team Oreca**	**(Monaco) Stéphane Ortelli (France) Soheil Ayari**	**Ford 7.0L V8**	MI	**226**
7	GT1	50	(France) Aston Martin Racing Larbre	(Portugal) Pedro Lamy (Switzerland) Gabriele Gardel (Belgium) Vincent Vosse	Aston Martin DBR9	MI	225
7	GT1	50	(France) Aston Martin Racing Larbre	(Portugal) Pedro Lamy (Switzerland) Gabriele Gardel (Belgium) Vincent Vosse	Aston Martin 6.0L V12	MI	225
8	GT1	63	(United Kingdom) Team Modena	(Australia) David Brabham (Spain) Antonio García (United Kingdom) Peter Hardman	Aston Martin DBR9	MI	224
8	GT1	63	(United Kingdom) Team Modena	(Australia) David Brabham (Spain) Antonio García (United Kingdom) Peter Hardman	Aston Martin 6.0L V12	MI	224
9	GT1	70	(Belgium) PSI Experience	(Netherlands) Jos Menten (Finland) Pertti Kuismanen (Finland) Markus Palttala	Chevrolet Corvette C6.R	D	223
9	GT1	70	(Belgium) PSI Experience	(Netherlands) Jos Menten (Finland) Pertti Kuismanen (Finland) Markus Palttala	Chevrolet LS7R 7.0L V8	D	223
10	GT1	67	(Russia) Convers MenX Team	(Netherlands) Peter Kox (Czech Republic) Robert Pergl (Russia) Alexey Vasilyev	Ferrari 550-GTS Maranello	MI	223
10	GT1	67	(Russia) Convers MenX Team	(Netherlands) Peter Kox (Czech Republic) Robert Pergl (Russia) Alexey Vasilyev	Ferrari 6.0L V12	MI	223
11	LMP2	44	(Germany) Kruse Motorsport	(Germany) Jan-Dirk Leuders (Germany) Jens Petersen (Austria) Norbert Siedler	Courage C65	KU	219
11	LMP2	44	(Germany) Kruse Motorsport	(Germany) Jan-Dirk Leuders (Germany) Jens Petersen (Austria) Norbert Siedler	Judd XV675 3.4L V8	KU	219
12	LMP1	13	(France) Courage Compétition	(Japan) Shinji Nakano (Japan) Haruki Kurosawa	Courage LC70	Y	217
12	LMP1	13	(France) Courage Compétition	(Japan) Shinji Nakano (Japan) Haruki Kurosawa	Mugen MF458S 4.5L V8	Y	217
13	LMP2	20	(France) Pierre Bruneau	(France) Pierre Bruneau (France) Marc Rostan	Pilbeam MP93	MI	214
13	LMP2	20	(France) Pierre Bruneau	(France) Pierre Bruneau (France) Marc Rostan	Judd XV675 3.4L V8	MI	214
14	**GT2**	**81**	**(United Kingdom) Team LNT**	**(United Kingdom) Robert Bell (United Kingdom) Warren Hughes**	**Panoz Esperante GT-LM**	P	**214**
14	**GT2**	**81**	**(United Kingdom) Team LNT**	**(United Kingdom) Robert Bell (United Kingdom) Warren Hughes**	**Ford (Élan) 5.0L V8**	P	**214**
15	GT2	78	(Italy) Autorlando Sport	(Denmark) Gunnar Kristensen (Denmark) Allan Simonsen	Porsche 911 GT3-RSR	P	214
15	GT2	78	(Italy) Autorlando Sport	(Denmark) Gunnar Kristensen (Denmark) Allan Simonsen	Porsche 3.6L Flat-6	P	214
16	GT2	86	(Netherlands) Spyker Squadron b.v.	(United Kingdom) Jonny Kane (United Kingdom) Peter Dumbreck	Spyker C8 Spyder GT2-R	D	213
16	GT2	86	(Netherlands) Spyker Squadron b.v.	(United Kingdom) Jonny Kane (United Kingdom) Peter Dumbreck	Audi 3.8L V8	D	213
17	LMP2	32	(France) Barazi-Epsilon	(Netherlands) Michael Vergers (Denmark) Juan Barazi (Italy) Davide Valsecchi	Courage C65	MI	213
17	LMP2	32	(France) Barazi-Epsilon	(Netherlands) Michael Vergers (Denmark) Juan Barazi (Italy) Davide Valsecchi	AER P07 2.0L Turbo I4	MI	213
18	GT2	82	(United Kingdom) Team LNT	(United Kingdom) Lawrence Tomlinson (United Kingdom) Richard Dean (United Kingdom) Marc Hynes	Panoz Esperante GT-LM	P	212
18	GT2	82	(United Kingdom) Team LNT	(United Kingdom) Lawrence Tomlinson (United Kingdom) Richard Dean (United Kingdom) Marc Hynes	Ford (Élan) 5.0L V8	P	212
19	GT2	99	(United Kingdom) Virgo Motorsport	(United Kingdom) Dan Eagling (United Kingdom) Tim Sugden	Ferrari F430GT	D	211
19	GT2	99	(United Kingdom) Virgo Motorsport	(United Kingdom) Dan Eagling (United Kingdom) Tim Sugden	Ferrari 4.0L V8	D	211
20	GT2	75	(France) Perspective Automobiles	(France) Anthony Beltoise (France) Philippe Hesnault (United Kingdom) Nigel Smith	Porsche 911 GT3-RSR	D	210
20	GT2	75	(France) Perspective Automobiles	(France) Anthony Beltoise (France) Philippe Hesnault (United Kingdom) Nigel Smith	Porsche 3.6L Flat-6	D	210
21	LMP2	36	(France) Paul Belmondo Racing	(Saudi Arabia) Karim Ojjeh (France) Paul Belmondo (France) Pierre Ragues	Courage C65	P	209
21	LMP2	36	(France) Paul Belmondo Racing	(Saudi Arabia) Karim Ojjeh (France) Paul Belmondo (France) Pierre Ragues	Ford (Mecachrome) 3.4L V8	P	209
22	GT2	92	(France) IMSA Performance Matmut	(France) Christophe Bouchut (France) Raymond Narac	Porsche 911 GT3-RSR	D	204
22	GT2	92	(France) IMSA Performance Matmut	(France) Christophe Bouchut (France) Raymond Narac	Porsche 3.6L Flat-6	D	204
23	GT2	96	(United Kingdom) James Watt Automotive	(United Kingdom) Paul Daniels (United Kingdom) Peter Cook (Germany) Wolfgang Kaufmann	Porsche 911 GT3-RSR	D	191
23	GT2	96	(United Kingdom) James Watt Automotive	(United Kingdom) Paul Daniels (United Kingdom) Peter Cook (Germany) Wolfgang Kaufmann	Porsche 3.6L Flat-6	D	191
24	GT2	95	(United Kingdom) Racesport Salisbury TVR	(United Kingdom) John Hartshorne (United Kingdom) Nigel Greensall	TVR Tuscan T400R	D	184
24	GT2	95	(United Kingdom) Racesport Salisbury TVR	(United Kingdom) John Hartshorne (United Kingdom) Nigel Greensall	TVR Speed Six 4.0L I6	D	184
25 DSQ^{†}	GT2	97	(Italy) GPC Sport	(Italy) Luca Drudi (Italy) Gabrio Rosa (Italy) Fabrizio De Simone	Ferrari F430GT	P	215
25 DSQ^{†}	GT2	97	(Italy) GPC Sport	(Italy) Luca Drudi (Italy) Gabrio Rosa (Italy) Fabrizio De Simone	Ferrari 4.0L V8	P	215
26 DNF	LMP2	25	(United Kingdom) Ray Mallock Ltd. (RML)	(Brazil) Thomas Erdos (United Kingdom) Mike Newton	MG-Lola EX264	MI	220
26 DNF	LMP2	25	(United Kingdom) Ray Mallock Ltd. (RML)	(Brazil) Thomas Erdos (United Kingdom) Mike Newton	AER P07 2.0L Turbo I4	MI	220
27 DNF	GT2	85	(Netherlands) Spyker Squadron b.v.	(Netherlands) Jeroen Bleekemolen (Netherlands) Mike Hezemans	Spyker C8 Spyder GT2-R	D	186
27 DNF	GT2	85	(Netherlands) Spyker Squadron b.v.	(Netherlands) Jeroen Bleekemolen (Netherlands) Mike Hezemans	Audi 3.8L V8	D	186
28 DNF	GT1	72	(France) Luc Alphand Aventures	(France) Jérôme Policand (France) Patrice Goueslard (France) Luc Alphand	Chevrolet Corvette C5-R	MI	184
28 DNF	GT1	72	(France) Luc Alphand Aventures	(France) Jérôme Policand (France) Patrice Goueslard (France) Luc Alphand	Chevrolet LS7R 7.0L V8	MI	184
29 DNF	LMP2	22	(United Kingdom) Rollcentre Racing	(United Kingdom) Martin Short (United Kingdom) Rob Barff (Portugal) João Barbosa	Radical SR9	D	129
29 DNF	LMP2	22	(United Kingdom) Rollcentre Racing	(United Kingdom) Martin Short (United Kingdom) Rob Barff (Portugal) João Barbosa	Judd XV675 3.4L V8	D	129
30 DNF	LMP1	12	(France) Courage Compétition	(France) Jean-Marc Gounon (United Kingdom) Gregor Fisken (Switzerland) Alexander Frei	Courage LC70	Y	75
30 DNF	LMP1	12	(France) Courage Compétition	(France) Jean-Marc Gounon (United Kingdom) Gregor Fisken (Switzerland) Alexander Frei	Mugen MF458S 4.5L V8	Y	75
31 DNF	LMP2	24	(United States) Binnie Motorsports	(United States) William Binnie (United Kingdom) Allen Timpany (United Kingdom) Sam Hancock	Lola B05/42	MI	75
31 DNF	LMP2	24	(United States) Binnie Motorsports	(United States) William Binnie (United Kingdom) Allen Timpany (United Kingdom) Sam Hancock	Zytek ZG348 3.4L V8	MI	75
32 DNF	GT2	76	(Italy) Autorlando Sport	(Germany) Marc Lieb (Switzerland) Joël Camathias	Porsche 911 GT3-RSR	P	55
32 DNF	GT2	76	(Italy) Autorlando Sport	(Germany) Marc Lieb (Switzerland) Joël Camathias	Porsche 3.6L Flat-6	P	55
33 DNF	GT2	73	(Belgium) Ice Pol Racing Team	(Belgium) Yves-Emmanuel Lambert (Belgium) Christian Lefort	Porsche 911 GT3-RSR	D	49
33 DNF	GT2	73	(Belgium) Ice Pol Racing Team	(Belgium) Yves-Emmanuel Lambert (Belgium) Christian Lefort	Porsche 3.6L Flat-6	D	49
34 DNF	LMP2	21	(United Kingdom) Team Bruichladdich Radical	(United Kingdom) Tim Greaves (United Kingdom) Stuart Moseley	Radical SR9	D	27
34 DNF	LMP2	21	(United Kingdom) Team Bruichladdich Radical	(United Kingdom) Tim Greaves (United Kingdom) Stuart Moseley	AER P07 2.0L Turbo I4	D	27
35 DNF	LMP1	3	(Italy) Lavaggi Sport	(Italy) Giovanni Lavaggi (France) Xavier Pompidou	Lavaggi LS1	D	27
35 DNF	LMP1	3	(Italy) Lavaggi Sport	(Italy) Giovanni Lavaggi (France) Xavier Pompidou	Ford (PME) 6.0L V8	D	27
36 DNF	GT2	90	(Germany) Farnbacher Racing	(Germany) Pierre Ehret (Germany) Marco Seefried	Porsche 911 GT3-RSR	Y	3
36 DNF	GT2	90	(Germany) Farnbacher Racing	(Germany) Pierre Ehret (Germany) Marco Seefried	Porsche 3.6L Flat-6	Y	3

† - #97 GPC Sport entry was disqualified due to having a driver in the car for more than 4 hours.

== Statistics ==
- Pole Position - #17 Pescarolo Sport - 1:23.242
- Fastest Lap - #12 Courage Competition - 1:24.570
- Average Speed - 151.644 km/h

Le Mans Series
Previous race: 2006 1000 km of Donington	2006 season	Next race: None
