= 2006 1000 km of Istanbul =

Le Mans Series season

Track map of the Istanbul Park

The 2006 1000 km of Istanbul was the opening race of the 2006 Le Mans Series season run by the ACO. It was run on April 9, 2006.

Due to a mistake made by event organizers, not enough fuel was brought to Istanbul to be able to supply all the entrants for a distance of 1000 km. Thus, the race was quickly shortened to a 4-hour timed race in order to ensure that there would be enough fuel for everyone.

== Qualifying ==
Pole position winners in each class are marked in bold.

| Pos | Class | No. | Team | Driver | Time | Gap | Grid |
|---|---|---|---|---|---|---|---|
| 1 | **LMP1** | **17** | **(France) Pescarolo Sport** | **(France) Emmanuel Collard** | **1:40.266** | — | 1 |
| 2 | LMP1 | 9 | (United Kingdom) Creation Autosportif | (France) Nicolas Minassian | 1:40.336 | +0.070 | 2 |
| 3 | LMP1 | 14 | (Netherlands) Racing for Holland | (Netherlands) Jan Lammers | 1:42.140 | +1.874 | 3 |
| 4 | **LMP2** | **25** | **(United Kingdom) Ray Mallock Ltd. (RML)** | **(Brazil) Thomas Erdos** | **1:42.336** | +2.070 | 4 |
| 5 | LMP1 | 13 | (France) Courage Compétition | (France) Jean-Marc Gounon | 1:42.672 | +2.406 | 5 |
| 6 | LMP1 | 5 | (Switzerland) Swiss Spirit | (Switzerland) Marcel Fässler | 1:42.883 | +2.617 | 6 |
| 7 | LMP2 | 22 | (United Kingdom) Rollcentre Racing | (Portugal) João Barbosa | 1:43.359 | +3.093 | 7 |
| 8 | LMP2 | 32 | (France) Barazi-Epsilon | (Netherlands) Michael Vergers | 1:43.820 | +3.554 | 8 |
| 9 | LMP2 | 37 | (France) Paul Belmondo Racing | (France) Didier André | 1:44.336 | +4.070 | 9 |
| 10 | LMP1 | 19 | (United Kingdom) Chamberlain-Synergy Motorsport | (United Kingdom) Bob Berridge | 1:44.976 | +4.710 | 10 |
| 11 | LMP1 | 6 | (United Kingdom) Lister Storm Racing | (Denmark) Nicolas Kiesa | 1:46.258 | +5.992 | 11 |
| 12 | LMP2 | 20 | (France) Pierre Bruneau | (France) Marc Rostan | 1:46.546 | +6.280 | 12 |
| 13 | LMP2 | 36 | (France) Paul Belmondo Racing | (France) Pierre Ragues | 1:46.594 | +6.328 | 13 |
| 14 | LMP2 | 35 | (Belgium) G-Force Racing | (France) Jean-François Leroch | 1:48.093 | +7.827 | 14 |
| 15 | **GT1** | **50** | **(France) Aston Martin Racing Larbre** | **(Portugal) Pedro Lamy** | **1:48.180** | **+7.914** | 15 |
| 16 | GT1 | 70 | (Belgium) PSI Experience | (Netherlands) Jos Menten | 1:49.187 | +8.921 | 16 |
| 17 | GT1 | 61 | (United Kingdom) Cirtek Motorsport (United Kingdom) Team Modena | (Spain) Antonio García | 1:49.328 | +9.062 | 17 |
| 18 | GT1 | 67 | (Russia) Convers MenX Team | (Netherlands) Peter Kox | 1:49.468 | +9.202 | 18 |
| 19 | GT1 | 72 | (France) Luc Alphand Aventures | (France) Jérôme Policand | 1:50.156 | +9.890 | 19 |
| 20 | GT1 | 62 | (United Kingdom) Cirtek Motorsport (United Kingdom) Team Modena | (United Kingdom) Peter Hardman | 1:53.742 | +13.476 | 20 |
| 21 | **GT2** | **84** | **(Italy) GPC Sport (Spain) Team Icer Brakes** | **(Sweden) Peter Sundberg** | **1:55.774** | **+15.508** | 21 |
| 22 | GT2 | 82 | (United Kingdom) Team LNT | (United Kingdom) Richard Dean | 1:56.234 | +15.968 | 22 |
| 23 | GT2 | 99 | (United Kingdom) Virgo Motorsport | (United Kingdom) Tim Sugden | 1:56.523 | +16.257 | 23 |
| 24 | GT2 | 97 | (Italy) GPC Sport | (Italy) Fabrizio de Simone | 1:56.539 | +16.273 | 24 |
| 25 | GT2 | 76 | (Italy) Autorlando Sport | (Germany) Marc Lieb | 1:56.774 | +16.508 | 25 |
| 26 | GT2 | 81 | (United Kingdom) Team LNT | (United Kingdom) Robert Bell | 1:56.890 | +16.624 | 26 |
| 27 | GT2 | 92 | (France) IMSA Performance Matmut | (France) Christophe Bouchut | 1:57.093 | +16.827 | 27 |
| 28 | GT2 | 78 | (Italy) Autorlando Sport | (Denmark) Allan Simonsen | 1:57.836 | +17.570 | 28 |
| 29 | GT2 | 90 | (Germany) Farnbacher Racing | (Germany) Dominik Farnbacher | 1:57.844 | +17.578 | 29 |
| 30 | GT2 | 85 | (Netherlands) Spyker Squadron b.v. | (Netherlands) Jeroen Bleekemolen | 1:57.914 | +17.648 | 30 |
| 31 | GT2 | 86 | (Netherlands) Spyker Squadron b.v. | (Netherlands) Donny Crevels | 1:58.735 | +18.469 | 31 |
| 32 | GT2 | 77 | (Germany) Seikel Motorsport | (Germany) Tim Bergmeister | 1:58.820 | +18.554 | 32 |
| 33 | GT2 | 73 | (Belgium) Ice Pol Racing Team | (France) Romain Iannetta | 2:01.312 | +21.046 | 33 |
| 34 | GT2 | 80 | (Germany) Farnbacher Racing | (Germany) Marco Seefried | 2:01.366 | +21.100 | 34 |
| 35 | GT2 | 75 | (France) Perspective Automobiles (France) Thierry Perrier | (United Kingdom) Nigel Smith | 2:02.196 | +21.930 | 35 |
| 36 | LMP2 | 28 | (Italy) Ranieri Randaccio | | No time | | 36 |
| 37 | GT1 | 51 | (Germany) B-Racing RS Line Team | | No time | | 37 |

== Official results ==
Class winners in bold. Cars failing to complete 70% of winner's distance marked as Not Classified (NC).

| Pos | Class | No | Team | Drivers | Chassis | Tyre | Laps |
| Pos | Class | No | Team | Drivers | Engine | Tyre | Laps |
|---|---|---|---|---|---|---|---|
| 1 | **LMP1** | **17** | **(France) Pescarolo Sport** | **(France) Emmanuel Collard (France) Jean-Christophe Boullion** | **Pescarolo C60 Hybrid** | MI | **134** |
| 1 | **LMP1** | **17** | **(France) Pescarolo Sport** | **(France) Emmanuel Collard (France) Jean-Christophe Boullion** | **Judd GV5 S2 5.0L V10** | MI | **134** |
| 2 | **LMP2** | **32** | **(France) Barazi-Epsilon** | **(Netherlands) Michael Vergers (Denmark) Juan Barazi (France) Jean-Philippe Belloc** | **Courage C65** | MI | **128** |
| 2 | **LMP2** | **32** | **(France) Barazi-Epsilon** | **(Netherlands) Michael Vergers (Denmark) Juan Barazi (France) Jean-Philippe Belloc** | **AER P07 2.0L Turbo I4** | MI | **128** |
| 3 | LMP1 | 6 | (United Kingdom) Lister Storm Racing | (United Kingdom) Justin Keen (Denmark) Nicolas Kiesa (Denmark) Jens Møller | Lister Storm LMP | D | 127 |
| 3 | LMP1 | 6 | (United Kingdom) Lister Storm Racing | (United Kingdom) Justin Keen (Denmark) Nicolas Kiesa (Denmark) Jens Møller | Chevrolet 6.0L V8 | D | 127 |
| 4 | LMP1 | 19 | (United Kingdom) Chamberlain-Synergy Motorsport | (United Kingdom) Bob Berridge (United Kingdom) Gareth Evans (United Kingdom) Peter Owen | Lola B06/10 | D | 127 |
| 4 | LMP1 | 19 | (United Kingdom) Chamberlain-Synergy Motorsport | (United Kingdom) Bob Berridge (United Kingdom) Gareth Evans (United Kingdom) Peter Owen | AER P32T 3.6L Turbo V8 | D | 127 |
| 5 | LMP2 | 20 | (France) Pierre Bruneau | (France) Marc Rostan (France) Pierre Bruneau | Pilbeam MP93 | MI | 125 |
| 5 | LMP2 | 20 | (France) Pierre Bruneau | (France) Marc Rostan (France) Pierre Bruneau | Judd XV675 3.4L V8 | MI | 125 |
| 6 | **GT1** | **50** | **(France) Aston Martin Racing Larbre** | **(Portugal) Pedro Lamy (Switzerland) Gabriele Gardel (Belgium) Vincent Vosse** | **Aston Martin DBR9** | MI | **125** |
| 6 | **GT1** | **50** | **(France) Aston Martin Racing Larbre** | **(Portugal) Pedro Lamy (Switzerland) Gabriele Gardel (Belgium) Vincent Vosse** | **Aston Martin AM04 6.0L V12** | MI | **125** |
| 7 | LMP2 | 35 | (Belgium) G-Force Racing | (United Kingdom) Ed Morris (Belgium) Frank Hahn (France) Jean-François Leroch | Courage C65 | D | 125 |
| 7 | LMP2 | 35 | (Belgium) G-Force Racing | (United Kingdom) Ed Morris (Belgium) Frank Hahn (France) Jean-François Leroch | Judd XV675 3.4L V8 | D | 125 |
| 8 | LMP2 | 37 | (France) Paul Belmondo Racing | (France) Paul Belmondo (France) Didier André (France) Yann Clairay | Courage C65 | P | 124 |
| 8 | LMP2 | 37 | (France) Paul Belmondo Racing | (France) Paul Belmondo (France) Didier André (France) Yann Clairay | Ford (Mecachrome) 3.4L V8 | P | 124 |
| 9 | GT1 | 67 | (Russia) Convers MenX Team | (Netherlands) Peter Kox (Czech Republic) Robert Pergl (Russia) Alexey Vasilyev | Ferrari 550-GTS Maranello | MI | 124 |
| 9 | GT1 | 67 | (Russia) Convers MenX Team | (Netherlands) Peter Kox (Czech Republic) Robert Pergl (Russia) Alexey Vasilyev | Ferrari F131 6.0L V12 | MI | 124 |
| 10 | GT1 | 72 | (France) Luc Alphand Aventures | (France) Jérôme Policand (France) Patrice Goueslard (France) Anthony Beltoise | Chevrolet Corvette C5-R | MI | 123 |
| 10 | GT1 | 72 | (France) Luc Alphand Aventures | (France) Jérôme Policand (France) Patrice Goueslard (France) Anthony Beltoise | Chevrolet LS7R 7.0L V8 | MI | 123 |
| 11 | GT1 | 61 | (United Kingdom) Cirtek Motorsport (United Kingdom) Team Modena | (United Kingdom) Nathan Kinch (Spain) Antonio García | Aston Martin DBR9 | MI | 122 |
| 11 | GT1 | 61 | (United Kingdom) Cirtek Motorsport (United Kingdom) Team Modena | (United Kingdom) Nathan Kinch (Spain) Antonio García | Aston Martin AM04 6.0L V12 | MI | 122 |
| 12 | GT1 | 62 | (United Kingdom) Cirtek Motorsport (United Kingdom) Team Modena | (United Kingdom) Peter Hardman (Netherlands) Christian Vann | Aston Martin DBR9 | MI | 122 |
| 12 | GT1 | 62 | (United Kingdom) Cirtek Motorsport (United Kingdom) Team Modena | (United Kingdom) Peter Hardman (Netherlands) Christian Vann | Aston Martin AM04 6.0L V12 | MI | 122 |
| 13 | **GT2** | **97** | **(Italy) GPC Sport** | **(Italy) Luca Drudi (Italy) Gabrio Rosa (Italy) Fabrizio de Simone** | **Ferrari F430GT** | P | **119** |
| 13 | **GT2** | **97** | **(Italy) GPC Sport** | **(Italy) Luca Drudi (Italy) Gabrio Rosa (Italy) Fabrizio de Simone** | **Ferrari F136 4.0L V8** | P | **119** |
| 14 | GT2 | 76 | (Italy) Autorlando Sport | (Germany) Marc Lieb (Switzerland) Joël Camathias | Porsche 911 GT3-RSR | P | 119 |
| 14 | GT2 | 76 | (Italy) Autorlando Sport | (Germany) Marc Lieb (Switzerland) Joël Camathias | Porsche 3.8L Flat-6 | P | 119 |
| 15 | GT2 | 82 | (United Kingdom) Team LNT | (United Kingdom) Lawrence Tomlinson (United Kingdom) Richard Dean | Panoz Esperante GT-LM | P | 118 |
| 15 | GT2 | 82 | (United Kingdom) Team LNT | (United Kingdom) Lawrence Tomlinson (United Kingdom) Richard Dean | Ford (Élan) 5.0L V8 | P | 118 |
| 16 | GT2 | 92 | (France) IMSA Performance Matmut | (France) Christophe Bouchut (France) Sébastien Dumez (France) Raymond Narac | Porsche 911 GT3-RSR | D | 118 |
| 16 | GT2 | 92 | (France) IMSA Performance Matmut | (France) Christophe Bouchut (France) Sébastien Dumez (France) Raymond Narac | Porsche M96/79 3.6L Flat-6 | D | 118 |
| 17 | GT2 | 85 | (Netherlands) Spyker Squadron b.v. | (Netherlands) Jeroen Bleekemolen (Netherlands) Mike Hezemans | Spyker C8 Spyder GT2-R | D | 118 |
| 17 | GT2 | 85 | (Netherlands) Spyker Squadron b.v. | (Netherlands) Jeroen Bleekemolen (Netherlands) Mike Hezemans | Audi 3.8L V8 | D | 118 |
| 18 | GT2 | 90 | (Germany) Farnbacher Racing | (Germany) Pierre Ehret (Germany) Dominik Farnbacher | Porsche 911 GT3-RSR | D | 117 |
| 18 | GT2 | 90 | (Germany) Farnbacher Racing | (Germany) Pierre Ehret (Germany) Dominik Farnbacher | Porsche M96/79 3.6L Flat-6 | D | 117 |
| 19 | LMP2 | 36 | (France) Paul Belmondo Racing | (France) Claude-Yves Gosselin (France) Pierre Ragues (Saudi Arabia) Karim Ojjeh | Courage C65 | P | 117 |
| 19 | LMP2 | 36 | (France) Paul Belmondo Racing | (France) Claude-Yves Gosselin (France) Pierre Ragues (Saudi Arabia) Karim Ojjeh | Ford (Mecachrome) 3.4L V8 | P | 117 |
| 20 | GT2 | 86 | (Netherlands) Spyker Squadron b.v. | (United Kingdom) Jonny Kane (Netherlands) Donny Crevels | Spyker C8 Spyder GT2-R | D | 117 |
| 20 | GT2 | 86 | (Netherlands) Spyker Squadron b.v. | (United Kingdom) Jonny Kane (Netherlands) Donny Crevels | Audi 3.8L V8 | D | 117 |
| 21 | GT2 | 99 | (United Kingdom) Virgo Motorsport | (United Kingdom) Dan Eagling (United Kingdom) Tim Sugden (United Kingdom) Ian Khan | Ferrari F430GT | D | 116 |
| 21 | GT2 | 99 | (United Kingdom) Virgo Motorsport | (United Kingdom) Dan Eagling (United Kingdom) Tim Sugden (United Kingdom) Ian Khan | Ferrari F136 4.0L V8 | D | 116 |
| 22 | GT2 | 77 | (Germany) Seikel Motorsport | (Canada) Tony Burgess (United States) Philip Collin (Germany) Tim Bergmeister | Porsche 911 GT3-RSR | Y | 113 |
| 22 | GT2 | 77 | (Germany) Seikel Motorsport | (Canada) Tony Burgess (United States) Philip Collin (Germany) Tim Bergmeister | Porsche M96/79 3.6L Flat-6 | Y | 113 |
| 23 | GT2 | 73 | (Belgium) Ice Pol Racing Team | (Belgium) Yves Lambert (Belgium) Christian Lefort (France) Romain Iannetta | Porsche 911 GT3-RSR | D | 112 |
| 23 | GT2 | 73 | (Belgium) Ice Pol Racing Team | (Belgium) Yves Lambert (Belgium) Christian Lefort (France) Romain Iannetta | Porsche M96/79 3.6L Flat-6 | D | 112 |
| 24 | GT2 | 78 | (Italy) Autorlando Sport | (Denmark) Gunnar Kristensen (Sweden) Jens Edman (Denmark) Allan Simonsen | Porsche 911 GT3-RSR | P | 111 |
| 24 | GT2 | 78 | (Italy) Autorlando Sport | (Denmark) Gunnar Kristensen (Sweden) Jens Edman (Denmark) Allan Simonsen | Porsche M96/79 3.6L Flat-6 | P | 111 |
| 25 | GT2 | 75 | (France) Perspective Automobiles (France) Thierry Perrier | (France) Philippe Hesnault (United Kingdom) Nigel Smith (New Zealand) Rob Wilson | Porsche 911 GT3-RSR | D | 107 |
| 25 | GT2 | 75 | (France) Perspective Automobiles (France) Thierry Perrier | (France) Philippe Hesnault (United Kingdom) Nigel Smith (New Zealand) Rob Wilson | Porsche M96/79 3.6L Flat-6 | D | 107 |
| 26 | LMP2 | 25 | (United Kingdom) Ray Mallock Ltd. (RML) | (Brazil) Thomas Erdos (United Kingdom) Mike Newton | MG-Lola EX264 | MI | 102 |
| 26 | LMP2 | 25 | (United Kingdom) Ray Mallock Ltd. (RML) | (Brazil) Thomas Erdos (United Kingdom) Mike Newton | AER P07 2.0L Turbo I4 | MI | 102 |
| 27 NC | GT2 | 80 | (Germany) Farnbacher Racing | (Denmark) Lars Erik Nielsen (Germany) Marco Seefried | Porsche 911 GT3-RSR | D | 88 |
| 27 NC | GT2 | 80 | (Germany) Farnbacher Racing | (Denmark) Lars Erik Nielsen (Germany) Marco Seefried | Porsche M96/79 3.6L Flat-6 | D | 88 |
| 28 DNF | LMP2 | 22 | (United Kingdom) Rollcentre Racing | (Portugal) João Barbosa (United Kingdom) Tim Greaves (United Kingdom) Martin Short | Radical SR9 | D | 120 |
| 28 DNF | LMP2 | 22 | (United Kingdom) Rollcentre Racing | (Portugal) João Barbosa (United Kingdom) Tim Greaves (United Kingdom) Martin Short | Judd XV675 3.4L V8 | D | 120 |
| 29 DNF | GT1 | 70 | (Belgium) PSI Experience | (Netherlands) Jos Menten (Finland) Pertti Kuismanen (Finland) Markus Palttala | Chevrolet Corvette C6.R | D | 79 |
| 29 DNF | GT1 | 70 | (Belgium) PSI Experience | (Netherlands) Jos Menten (Finland) Pertti Kuismanen (Finland) Markus Palttala | Chevrolet LS7R 7.0L V8 | D | 79 |
| 30 DNF | LMP1 | 13 | (France) Courage Compétition | (France) Jean-Marc Gounon (Japan) Shinji Nakano (Japan) Haruki Kurosawa | Courage LC70 | Y | 79 |
| 30 DNF | LMP1 | 13 | (France) Courage Compétition | (France) Jean-Marc Gounon (Japan) Shinji Nakano (Japan) Haruki Kurosawa | Mugen MF458S 4.5L V8 | Y | 79 |
| 31 DNF | LMP1 | 14 | (Netherlands) Racing for Holland | (Netherlands) Jan Lammers (Malaysia) Alex Yoong | Dome S101Hb | D | 62 |
| 31 DNF | LMP1 | 14 | (Netherlands) Racing for Holland | (Netherlands) Jan Lammers (Malaysia) Alex Yoong | Mugen MF408S 4.0L V8 | D | 62 |
| 32 DNF | LMP1 | 9 | (United Kingdom) Creation Autosportif | (France) Nicolas Minassian (Italy) Giuseppe Gabbiani (Switzerland) Felipe Ortiz | Creation CA06/H | MI | 56 |
| 32 DNF | LMP1 | 9 | (United Kingdom) Creation Autosportif | (France) Nicolas Minassian (Italy) Giuseppe Gabbiani (Switzerland) Felipe Ortiz | Judd GV5 S2 5.0L V10 | MI | 56 |
| 33 DNF | GT2 | 81 | (United Kingdom) Team LNT | (United Kingdom) Warren Hughes (United Kingdom) Robert Bell | Panoz Esperante GT-LM | P | 28 |
| 33 DNF | GT2 | 81 | (United Kingdom) Team LNT | (United Kingdom) Warren Hughes (United Kingdom) Robert Bell | Ford (Élan) 5.0L V8 | P | 28 |
| 34 DNF | LMP2 | 28 | (Italy) Ranieri Randaccio | (Italy) Ranieri Randaccio (Italy) Fabio Mancini (Italy) Gianni Collini | Lucchini LMP2/04 | D | 26 |
| 34 DNF | LMP2 | 28 | (Italy) Ranieri Randaccio | (Italy) Ranieri Randaccio (Italy) Fabio Mancini (Italy) Gianni Collini | Judd XV675 3.4L V8 | D | 26 |
| 35 DNF | GT2 | 84 | (Italy) GPC Sport (Spain) Team Icer Brakes | (Spain) Jesús Díez Villarroel (Sweden) Peter Sundberg | Ferrari F430GT | D | 23 |
| 35 DNF | GT2 | 84 | (Italy) GPC Sport (Spain) Team Icer Brakes | (Spain) Jesús Díez Villarroel (Sweden) Peter Sundberg | Ferrari F136 4.0L V8 | D | 23 |
| 36 DNF | LMP1 | 5 | (Switzerland) Swiss Spirit | (Switzerland) Harold Primat (Switzerland) Marcel Fässler | Courage LC70 | MI | 20 |
| 36 DNF | LMP1 | 5 | (Switzerland) Swiss Spirit | (Switzerland) Harold Primat (Switzerland) Marcel Fässler | Judd GV5 S2 5.0L V10 | MI | 20 |

== Statistics ==
- Pole Position - #17 Pescarolo Sport - 1:40.266
- Fastest Lap - #17 Pescarolo Sport - 1:41.281
- Distance - 715.292 km
- Average Speed - 177.588 km/h

Le Mans Series
| Previous race: None | 2006 season | Next race: 2006 1000 km of Spa |
