= 1000 km Istanbul =

1000 km of Istanbul
- Venue: Istanbul Park
- First race: 2005
- Last race: 2006
- Most wins (driver): Emmanuel Collard, Jean-Christophe Boullion (2)
- Most wins (team): Pescarolo Sport (2)
- Most wins (manufacturer): Pescarolo (2)

The 1000 Kilometres of Istanbul was a sports car race held at Istanbul Park in Istanbul, Turkey. The race was first held on 13 November 2005 as part of the 2005 Le Mans Endurance Series season and last held on 9 April 2006 as part of the 2006 Le Mans Series season. It has been a part of the Le Mans Endurance Series and Le Mans Series. In 2005, in its debut, the race ended after 6 hours when 1000 km were not covered by that time. In 2006 it was shortened to 4 hours due to a fuel logistics issue, and it was not held next season.

== Winners ==
Year	Drivers	Team	Car	Distance/Duration	Championship	Report	Ref
2005	(France) Emmanuel Collard (France) Jean-Christophe Boullion	(France) Pescarolo Sport	Pescarolo C60 Hybrid Judd	6 hours	Le Mans Endurance Series	report	
2006	(France) Emmanuel Collard (France) Jean-Christophe Boullion	(France) Pescarolo Sport	Pescarolo C60 Hybrid Judd	4 hours	Le Mans Series	report	
