= Kevin McGarrity =

Northern Irish racing driver (born 1973)

Kevin McGarrity (born 3 August 1973) is a Northern Irish racing driver from Belfast.

McGarrity won the Formula Ford Festival in 1995 after finishing second in the British Formula Ford series. He was nominated for the McLaren Autosport BRDC Award but it went to fellow Northern Ireland driver Jonny Kane. In 1996, he drove in Formula Opel, and the following year, he drove in the British Formula Three Championship where he finished tenth. In 1998, he moved up to Formula 3000 where he competed in the first five races for Raceprep Motorsport and rounds 7 through 9 for Nordic Racing. He competed full-time in 1999 for Nordic Racing and finished tenth in points despite only finishing in the points once, finishing on the podium in second in the season opener at Imola. He returned to the team and series in 2000, this time with teammate Justin Wilson. He finished 20th in points with a best finish of fourth at Monaco. In 2001, he left formula cars for sports car racing and drove in the 2001 24 Hours of Le Mans for the MG factory team, but the car failed to finish. He drove the same car in 2002 but the result was the same. He returned to the race in 2004 driving a Bioethanol powered Reynard-Judd for Team Nasamax, finishing the race 17th overall. He drove part-time in the Le Mans Series in 2006. He then joined McLaren Automotive as full-time test driver for the new McLaren car project the MP4-12C from the start of the project.

== 24 Hours of Le Mans results ==
Year	Team	Co-Drivers	Car	Class	Laps	Pos.	Class Pos.
2001	(United Kingdom) MG Sport & Racing Ltd.	(United Kingdom) Julian Bailey (United Kingdom) Mark Blundell	MG-Lola EX257	LMP675	92	DNF	DNF
2002	(United Kingdom) MG Sport & Racing Ltd.	(United Kingdom) Julian Bailey (United Kingdom) Mark Blundell	MG-Lola EX257	LMP675	219	DNF	DNF
2004	(United Kingdom) Team Nasamax (United Kingdom) McNeil Engineering	(Canada) Robbie Stirling (South Africa) Werner Lupberger	Nasamax DM139-Judd	LMP1	316	17th	7th

=== Complete International Formula 3000 results ===
(key) (Races in bold indicate pole position) (Races in italics indicate fastest lap)

Year	Entrant	1	2	3	4	5	6	7	8	9	10	11	12	DC	Points
1998	Raceprep Motorsport	OSC; DNQ	IMO; 14	CAT; 27	SIL; Ret	MON; DNQ	PAU							16th	3
1998	Nordic Racing							A1R	HOC; 4	HUN; Ret	SPA	PER	NÜR	16th	3
1999	Nordic Racing	IMO; 2	MON; DNQ	CAT; 9	MAG; Ret	SIL; 23	A1R; DNQ	HOC; 15	HUN; 10	SPA; Ret	NÜR; 7			11th	6
2000	Nordic Racing	IMO; 15	SIL; Ret	CAT; Ret	NÜR; Ret	MON; 4	MAG; 15	A1R; DNQ	HOC; 11	HUN; Ret	SPA; DNQ			21st	3

Sporting positions
Preceded by Jason Watt	Formula Ford Festival Winner; 1995	Succeeded by Mark Webber
