= Ángel Burgueño =

Spanish racing driver

- Nationality: (Spain) Spanish
- Born: 12 June 1973 (age 53) Madrid (Spain)

Ángel Burgueño (born 12 June 1973 in Madrid) is a Spanish racing driver. He has competed in such series as World Series by Nissan and the Le Mans Series.

In 1995, Burgueno came second at Silverstone in the Eurocup behind Briton, Guy Smith.

He won the GTA class of the Spanish GT Championship in 2004 with Miguel Ángel de Castro.

== 24 Hours of Le Mans results ==
Year	Team	Co-Drivers	Car	Class	Laps	Pos.	Class Pos.
2008	(Spain) Epsilon Euskadi	(Spain) Miguel Ángel de Castro (Spain) Adrián Vallés	Epsilon Euskadi EE1-Judd	LMP1	189	DNF	DNF
