= Jérôme Policand =

French racing driver

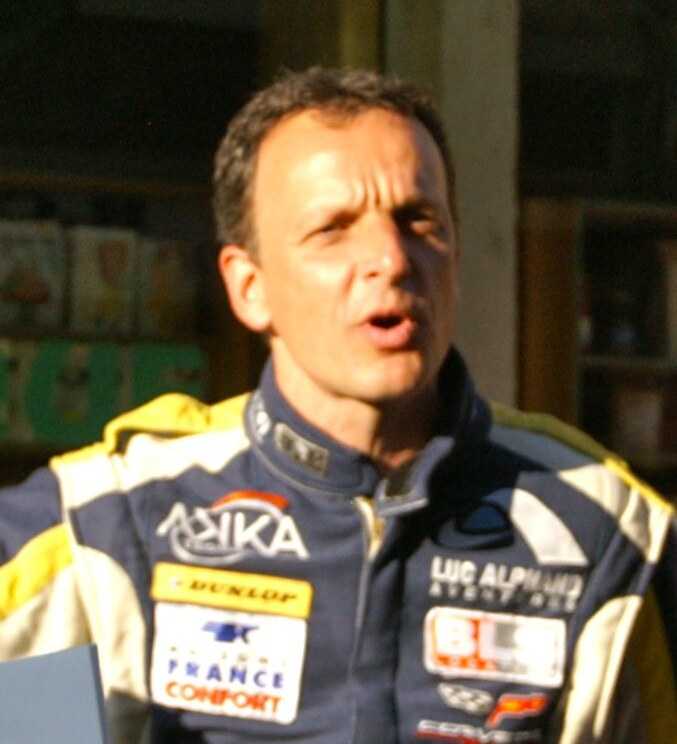
- Policand in 2010
- Nationality: (France) French
- Born: Jérôme Jean Édouard Policand; 1 October 1964 (age 62) Grenoble, France
- Categorisation: FIA Gold (until 2014); FIA Silver (2015–2019); FIA Bronze (2020–)
24 Hours of Le Mans career
- Years: 1996 – 2003, 2005 – 2008, 2010
- Teams: Courage Compétition, Jabouille-Bouresche, SMG, DAMS, Luc Alphand Aventures
- Best finish: 4th (1997)
- Class wins: 0

Jérôme Jean Édouard Policand (born 1 October 1964 in Grenoble) is a French racing driver. He drove in Le Mans Series Championship and the 24 Hours of Le Mans in GT1 class for the Team Luc Alphand Aventures. He is currently the team principal of French GT World Challenge Europe team AKKodis ASP.

== 24 Hours of Le Mans results ==
Year	Team	Co-Drivers	Car	Class	Laps	Pos.	Class Pos.
1996	(France) Courage Compétition	(France) Didier Cottaz (France) Philippe Alliot	Courage C36-Porsche	LMP1	215	DNF	DNF
1997	(France) Courage Compétition	(France) Didier Cottaz (Belgium) Marc Goossens	Courage C41-Porsche	LMP1	336	4th	2nd
1998	(France) JB Racing	(Italy) Vincenzo Sospiri (France) Jean-Christophe Boullion	Ferrari 333 SP	LMP1	187	DNF	DNF
1999	(France) JB Racing	(Italy) Mauro Baldi (Italy) Christian Pescatori	Ferrari 333 SP	LMP	71	DNF	DNF
2000	(France) Racing Organisation Course	(Spain) Jordi Gené (France) Jean-Christophe Boullion	Reynard 2KQ-LM-Volkswagen	LMP675	72	DNF	DNF
2001	(France) SMG Compétition	(France) Philippe Gache (France) Anthony Beltoise	Courage C60-Judd	LMP900	51	DNF	DNF
2002	(France) DAMS	(Belgium) Marc Duez (United Kingdom) Perry McCarthy	Panoz LMP-1 Roadster-S	LMP900	98	DNF	DNF
2003	(France) Luc Alphand Aventures	(France) Luc Alphand (France) Frédéric Dor	Ferrari 550-GTS Maranello	GTS	298	21st	5th
2005	(France) Luc Alphand Aventures	(France) Luc Alphand (France) Christopher Campbell	Porsche 911 GT3-RS	GT2	311	18th	5th
2006	(France) Luc Alphand Aventures	(France) Luc Alphand (France) Patrice Goueslard	Chevrolet Corvette C5-R	GT1	346	7th	3rd
2007	(France) Luc Alphand Aventures	(France) Luc Alphand (France) Patrice Goueslard	Chevrolet Corvette C6.R	GT1	327	12th	7th
2008	(France) Luc Alphand Aventures	(France) Luc Alphand (France) Guillaume Moreau	Chevrolet Corvette C6.R	GT1	335	17th	5th
2010	(France) Luc Alphand Aventures	(France) Stéphan Grégoire (Netherlands) David Hart	Chevrolet Corvette C6.R	GT1	327	15th	2nd

Sporting positions
Preceded by Andrea Belicchi	Eurocup Mégane Trophy Champion; 1999	Succeeded by Luca Rangoni
