= Anthony Beltoise =

French auto racing driver (born 1971)

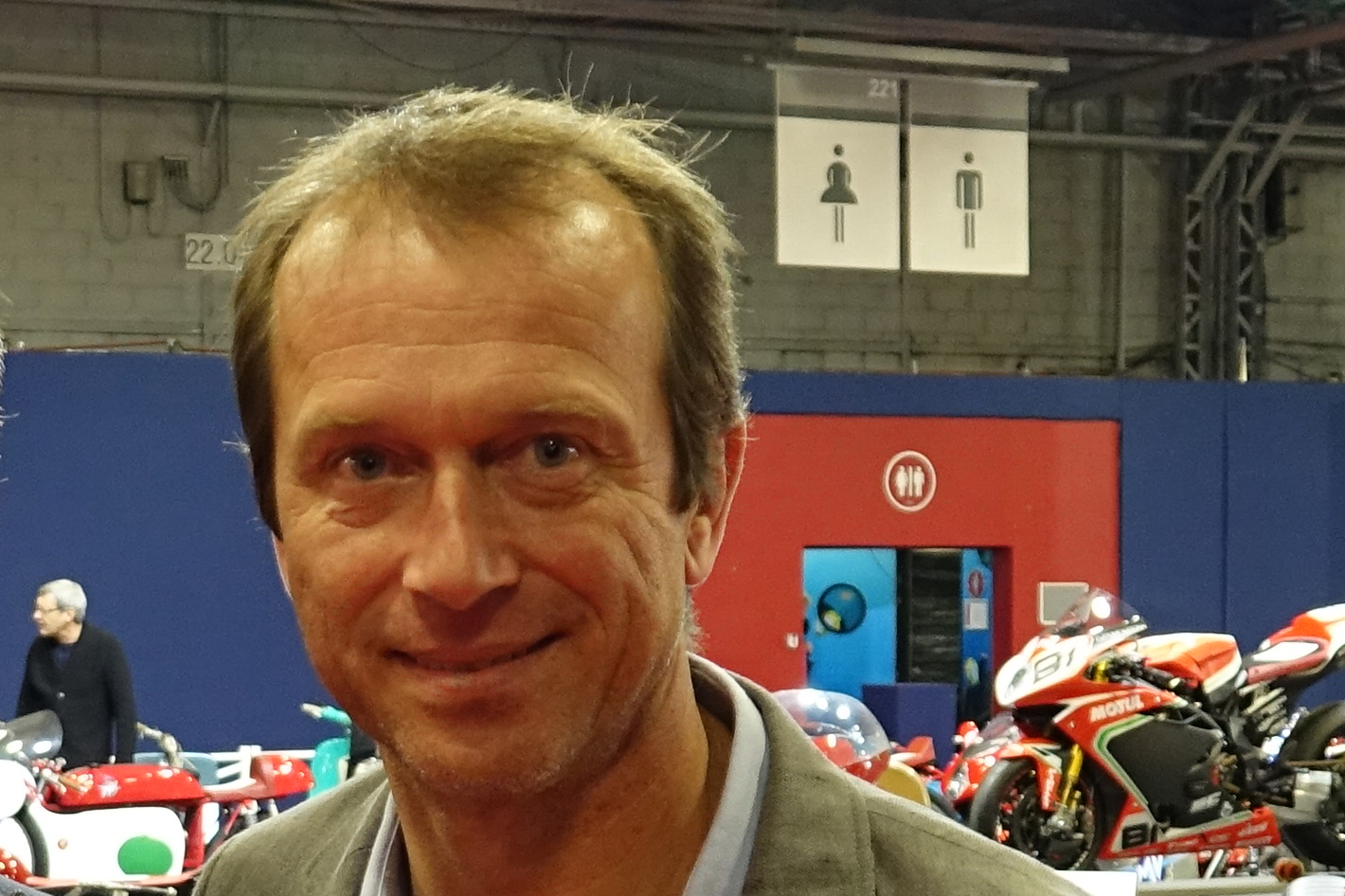
- Nationality: French
- Born: Anthony Jean-Pierre Beltoise; 21 July 1971 (age 55) Neuilly-sur-Seine, France
- Relatives: Jean-Pierre Beltoise (father); François Cevert (uncle); Vincent Beltoise (cousin)
- Categorisation: FIA Gold (until 2021); FIA Silver (2022–)
24 Hours of Le Mans career
- Years: 2000 - 2001, 2011
- Teams: Viper Team Oreca; SMG Compétition; Luxury Racing
- Best finish: 9th (2000)
- Class wins: 0

Anthony Jean-Pierre Beltoise (born 21 July 1971, in Neuilly-sur-Seine) is a French auto racing driver. He is the son of former Grand Prix motorcycle racer and Formula One driver Jean-Pierre Beltoise and nephew of fellow Formula One driver François Cevert, as his mother is Cevert's sister.

== Career ==
=== Single-seaters ===
Beltoise began his career in the Championnat de France Formula Renault 2.0 in 1993, finishing tenth, and improving to seventh in 1994. He competed in the French Formula Three Championship in 1995 and 1996, finishing eleventh in 1995 and runner-up to Soheil Ayari in 1996. Beltoise competed in the 1997 International Formula 3000 season, although failed to score any points in seven races.

=== After single-seaters ===
Beltoise competed in the 1998 International Sports Racing Series season, finishing the season tenth. He then competed in the Renault Sport Clio Trophy between 1999 and 2002, finishing fourth, 11th, third and sixth over the four years. He made his first 24 Hours of Le Mans appearance in 2000, finishing second in the GTS class in an Oreca Chrysler Viper. He also drove for SMG in the LMP900 class in 2001. Since 2004, he has competed in the Porsche Carrera Cup France, winning it in 2005, 2006 and 2008. He has also regularly competed in the FFSA GT Championship. In 2007, he made a one-off appearance for Exagon Engineering in the World Touring Car Championship at Pau. Since 2007, he has often raced in the Le Mans Series, and in 2008, he was test and reserve driver for the Team Peugeot Total LMP1 programme.

=== 24 Hours of Le Mans results ===
| Year | Team | Co-Drivers | Car | Class | Laps | Pos. | Class Pos. |
|---|---|---|---|---|---|---|---|
| 2000 | (France) Viper Team Oreca | (United States) David Donohue (Portugal) Ni Amorim | Chrysler Viper GTS-R | GTS | 328 | 9th | 2nd |
| 2001 | (France) SMG Compétition | (France) Philippe Gache (France) Jérôme Policand | Courage C60-Judd | LMP900 | 51 | DNF | DNF |
| 2011 | (France) Luxury Racing | (France) François Jakubowski (France) Pierre Thiriet | Ferrari 458 Italia GTC | GTE; Pro | 136 | DNF | DNF |

== Other activities ==
Beltoise regularly appears in the French Tv show AutoMoto (TF1). He is portrayed as the in-house racing driver and does high speed testing (comparing cars on a fixed piece of track) and testing of race cars.

Sporting positions
| Preceded by James Ruffier | Porsche Carrera Cup France Champion; 2005-2006 | Succeeded by Patrick Pilet |
| Preceded by Patrick Pilet | Porsche Carrera Cup France Champion; 2008 | Succeeded by Renaud Derlot |
