= Creation CA07 =

British sports car prototype

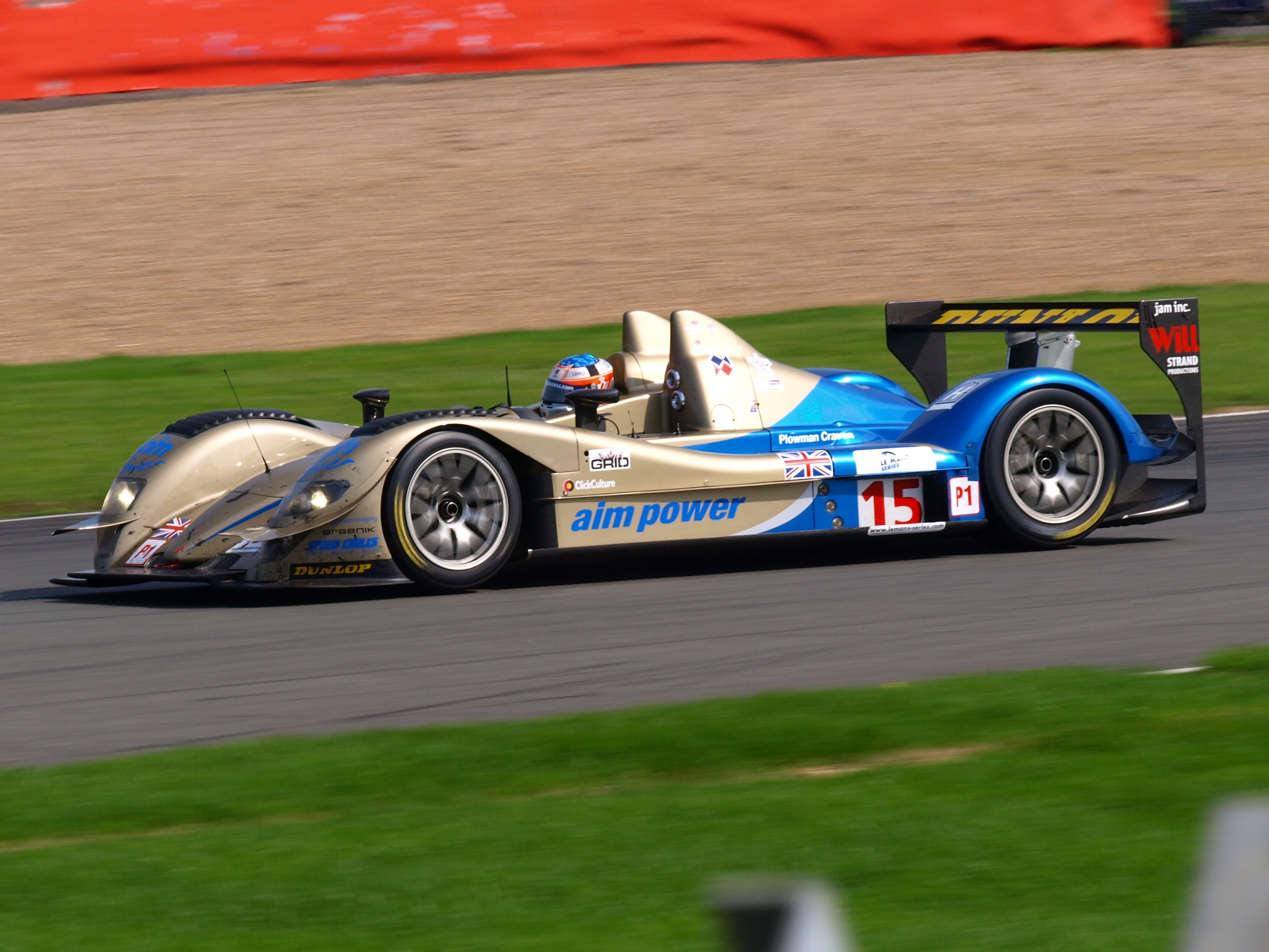
- Creation CA07-AIM at the 2008 1000km of Silverstone
- Category: Le Mans Prototype
- Constructor: KW Motorsport
- Designer: Kieron Salter
- Predecessor: Creation CA06/H

Technical specifications
- Chassis: Carbon fiber and aluminium composite monocoque chassis
- Suspension (front): Double wishbones, pushrod actuated coil springs and dampers with power steering.
- Suspension (rear): Same as front
- Length: 4,450 mm (175 in)
- Width: 2,000 mm (79 in)
- Height: 1,020 mm (40 in)
- Axle track: 1,678 mm (66.1 in) (front); 1,678 mm (66.1 in) (rear)
- Wheelbase: 2,815 mm (110.8 in)
- Engine: Judd GV5.5 5,496 cc (5.5 L; 335.4 cu in) NA, 40-valve, DOHC 72° V10 mid-engine, longitudinally-mounted AIM (Judd) YS5.5 5,496 cc (5.5 L; 335.4 cu in) NA, 40-valve, DOHC 90° V10 mid-engine, longitudinally-mounted
- Transmission: Ricardo 6-speed sequential
- Power: 650 hp (659 PS; 485 kW)
- Weight: 925 kg (2,039 lb) (Judd); 900 kg (2,000 lb) (AIM)
- Brakes: Carbon ceramic ventilated discs, all-round
- Tyres: Dunlop; Michelin

Competition history
- Notable entrants: (United Kingdom) Creation Autosportif (United States) Autocon Motorsports
- Notable drivers: (United Kingdom) Jamie Campbell-Walter (United Kingdom) Stuart Hall (South Africa) Stephen Simpson (Japan) Shinji Nakano (Switzerland) Harold Primat (France) Bruce Jouanny (United Kingdom) Johnny Mowlem (Belgium) Marc Goossens (United Kingdom) Robbie Kerr (United States) Liz Halliday (Belgium) Vanina Ickx (France) Romain Iannetta
- Debut: 2007 24 Hours of Le Mans
- Last event: 2009 24 Hours of Le Mans
| Races | Wins | Podiums | Poles | F/Laps |
|---|---|---|---|---|
| 16 | 0 | 1 | 0 | 0 |
- Teams' Championships: 0
- Constructors' Championships: 0
- Drivers' Championships: 0

The Creation CA07 is an Le Mans Prototype LMP1 race car designed, developed and built by British manufacturer Creation Autosportif and KW Motorsport, for the Le Mans Endurance Series and the 24 Hours of Le Mans. A replacement to the Creation CA06/H, it was Creation's first all-new prototype.

== Racing history ==
=== 2007 ===
The debut race for the car was at the 2007 24 Hours of Le Mans. It was run by Creation Autosportif with drivers, Jamie Campbell-Walter, Shinji Nakano and Felipe Ortiz. They qualified tenth overall and fifth among petrol powered cars with a time of 3:36.279. After multiple accidents and spins, the car retired due to overheating issues.

The team would run the car in the remaining four rounds of the Le Mans Series. They finished in the points in all races they competed, with a best finish of third at the final round at Interlagos. Despite missing the first two rounds of the season, the team finished tied for fifth place in LMP1 team standings.

Creation Autosportif also entered the car in final two races of the American Le Mans Series with drivers Jamie Campbell-Walter, Christophe Tinseau and Harold Primat. The first race was the Petit Le Mans, where the car would finish fifth overall and second in class, 17 laps down. At the season finale at Laguna Seca, Campbell-Walter and Primat finished ninth overall and third in class, three laps down from the winning Audi R10 TDI.

=== 2008 ===
The car would again be entered into the Le Mans Series but two examples would be raced for the majority of the season due to a partnership between Creation and Japanese company AIM. A new engine was developed with funding from AIM resulting in a wider engine at 90°.

One car was entered into the opening round at Catalunya with drivers Jamie Campbell-Walter, Stuart Hall and Filipe Ortiz. After running well in the early stages of the race, the car suffered slipping clutch issues. This dropped them out of contention however, they did finish the race, albeit 33rd overall and 52 laps down.

At the 1000 km of Monza, Jamie Campbell-Walter, driving the #14 CA07, suffered a massive accident during qualifying and was subsequently withdrawn from the race. For the #15, it would achieve the best finish of the season with a fourth overall position. Stuart Hall and Robbie Kerr finished ninth overall and sixth in class, nine laps down from the leader, at the 1000 km of Spa.

For the 2008 24 Hours of Le Mans, two cars were entered, one from Creation Autosportif and one from American customer team Autocon Motorsports. The #14 Creation entry utilized the AIM (Judd) engine while the #23 Autocon Motorsports ran the Judd GV5.5 engine. Qualifying did not go well for both entrants. The #14 qualified in 21st with a best time of 3:35.994 while the #23 qualified 32nd with a best time of 3:47.695.

The first car to run into problems was the #14, which had a broken wing support. Later on, with Johnny Mowlem driving, the car suffered a puncture heading towards Indianapolis and hit the wall. Mowlem brought the car back to the pits to repair the front splitter and side of the car. After a quiet and trouble free night, the #23, driven by Chris McMurry had a puncture on the right rear on the Mulsanne. The #14 Creation Autosportif finished 24th overall, 11th in class and 65 laps down from the leader. The #23 Autocon Motorsports retired and classified 38th, completing 224 laps.

The next race was the 1000 km of Nürburgring, where two cars were entered. The #15 finished eighth while the #14 finished 22nd. The final race of the Le Mans Series at Silverstone saw the #14 retire and the #15 finish in sixth.

Creation would again enter the final two races of the American Le Mans Series. Two cars were brought for the Petit Le Mans. In the third hour, the #888 entry driven by Dean Stiling, crashed at turn 1 and was eventually retired. Later on in the sixth hour, the sister #88 car retired due to gearbox issues. At the final race at Laguna Seca, the car finished 17th overall and fourth in class, just missing the podium.

=== 2009 ===
Financial difficulties due to the 2008 financial crisis meant that the CA07 only ran in one race, the 24 Hours of Le Mans. Changes to this car include revised rear bodywork and a change of engine to the Judd GV5.5. The #4 entry was driven by Jamie Campbell-Walter, Vanina Ickx and Romain Iannetta. The car qualified 19th overall, with a time of 3:35.960. In the final race, the team finished 24th overall and 63 laps down.

== Racing results ==
=== Complete Le Mans Series results ===
(key) Races in bold indicates pole position. Races in italics indicates fastest lap.

| Year | Entrants | Class | Drivers | No. | 1 | 2 | 3 | 4 | 5 | 6 | Pts. | Pos. |
|---|---|---|---|---|---|---|---|---|---|---|---|---|
| 2007 | Creation Autosportif | LMP1 | | 9 | MON | VAL | NÜR | SPA | SIL | INT | 15 | 5th |
| 2007 | Creation Autosportif | LMP1 | (United Kingdom) Jamie Campbell-Walter | 9 | | | 5 | 6 | 4 | 3 | 15 | 5th |
| 2007 | Creation Autosportif | LMP1 | (Japan) Shinji Nakano | 9 | | | 5 | | | | 15 | 5th |
| 2007 | Creation Autosportif | LMP1 | (Switzerland) Felipe Ortiz | 9 | | | 5 | 6 | 4 | 3 | 15 | 5th |
| 2007 | Creation Autosportif | LMP1 | (Japan) Haruki Kurosawa | 9 | | | | | 4 | | 15 | 5th |
| 2007 | Creation Autosportif | LMP1 | (United Kingdom) Stuart Hall | 9 | | | | | | 3 | 15 | 5th |
| 2008 | Creation AIM | LMP1 | | 14 | CAT | MON | SPA | NÜR | SIL | | 0 | – |
| 2008 | Creation AIM | LMP1 | (United Kingdom) Jamie Campbell-Walter | 14 | 11 | DNS | | | | | 0 | – |
| 2008 | Creation AIM | LMP1 | (United Kingdom) Stuart Hall | 14 | 11 | DNS | | | | | 0 | – |
| 2008 | Creation AIM | LMP1 | (Switzerland) Felipe Ortiz | 14 | 11 | | | | | | 0 | – |
| 2008 | Creation AIM | LMP1 | (South Africa) Stephen Simpson | 14 | | | | 10 | | | 0 | – |
| 2008 | Creation AIM | LMP1 | (United States) Liz Halliday | 14 | | | | 10 | Ret | | 0 | – |
| 2008 | Creation AIM | LMP1 | (United Kingdom) Ryan Lewis | 14 | | | | | Ret | | 0 | – |
| 2008 | Creation AIM | LMP1 | (United Kingdom) Stuart Hall | 15 | | 4 | 6 | 7 | 5 | | 14 | 7th |
| 2008 | Creation AIM | LMP1 | (France) Bruce Jouanny | 15 | | 4 | | | | | 14 | 7th |
| 2008 | Creation AIM | LMP1 | (United Kingdom) Robbie Kerr | 15 | | 4 | 6 | | | | 14 | 7th |
| 2008 | Creation AIM | LMP1 | (United Kingdom) Jamie Campbell-Walter | 15 | | | | 7 | 5 | | 14 | 7th |

=== Complete American Le Mans Series results ===
(key) Races in bold indicates pole position. Races in italics indicates fastest lap.

| Year | Entrants | Class | Drivers | No. | 1 | 2 | 3 | 4 | 5 | 6 | 7 | 8 | 9 | 10 | 11 | 12 | Pts. | Pos. |
|---|---|---|---|---|---|---|---|---|---|---|---|---|---|---|---|---|---|---|
| 2007 | Creation Autosportif | LMP1 | | | SEB | STP | LBH | HOU | UTA | LRP | MOH | ELK | MOS | BEL | ROA | MON | 38 | 5th |
| 2007 | Creation Autosportif | LMP1 | (United Kingdom) Jamie Campbell-Walter | 88 | | | | | | | | | | | 5 | 9 | 38 | 5th |
| 2007 | Creation Autosportif | LMP1 | (Switzerland) Harold Primat | 88 | | | | | | | | | | | 5 | 9 | 38 | 5th |
| 2007 | Creation Autosportif | LMP1 | (France) Christophe Tinseau | 88 | | | | | | | | | | | 5 | | 38 | 5th |
| 2008 | Creation AIM | LMP1 | | 88 | SEB | STP | LBH | UTA | LRP | MOH | ELK | MOS | BEL | ROA | MON | | 15 | 7th |
| 2008 | Creation AIM | LMP1 | (South Africa) Stephen Simpson | 88 | | | | | | | | | | Ret | 4 | | 15 | 7th |
| 2008 | Creation AIM | LMP1 | (Switzerland) Harold Primat | 88 | | | | | | | | | | Ret | | | 15 | 7th |
| 2008 | Creation AIM | LMP1 | (United Kingdom) Jamie Campbell-Walter | 88 | | | | | | | | | | Ret | | | 15 | 7th |
| 2008 | Creation AIM | LMP1 | (United States) Liz Halliday | 88 | | | | | | | | | | | 4 | | 15 | 7th |
| 2008 | Creation AIM | LMP1 | (United States) Liz Halliday | 888 | | | | | | | | | | Ret | | | 0 | – |
| 2008 | Creation AIM | LMP1 | (United Kingdom) Stuart Hall | 888 | | | | | | | | | | Ret | | | 0 | – |
| 2008 | Creation AIM | LMP1 | (Canada) Dean Stirling | 888 | | | | | | | | | | Ret | | | 0 | – |

=== Complete 24 Hours of Le Mans results ===
| Year | Entrant | No. | Drivers | Class | Laps | Pos. | Class Pos. |
|---|---|---|---|---|---|---|---|
| 2007 | (United Kingdom) Creation Autosportif | 9 | (United Kingdom) Jamie Campbell-Walter (Japan) Shinji Nakano (Bolivia) Felipe Ortiz | LMP1 | 55 | DNF | DNF |
| 2008 | (United Kingdom) Creation Autosportif | 14 | (United Kingdom) Stuart Hall (United Kingdom) Johnny Mowlem (Belgium) Marc Goossens | LMP1 | 316 | 24th | 11th |
| 2008 | (United States) Autocon Motorsports (United Kingdom) Creation Autosportif | 23 | (United States) Bryan Willman (United States) Michael Lewis (United States) Chris McMurry | LMP1 | 224 | DNF | DNF |
| 2009 | (United Kingdom) Creation Autosportif | 4 | (United Kingdom) Jamie Campbell-Walter (Belgium) Vanina Ickx (France) Romain Iannetta | LMP1 | 319 | 24th | 15th |
