= 2007 Monterey Sports Car Championships =

Track map of Mazda Raceway Laguna Seca

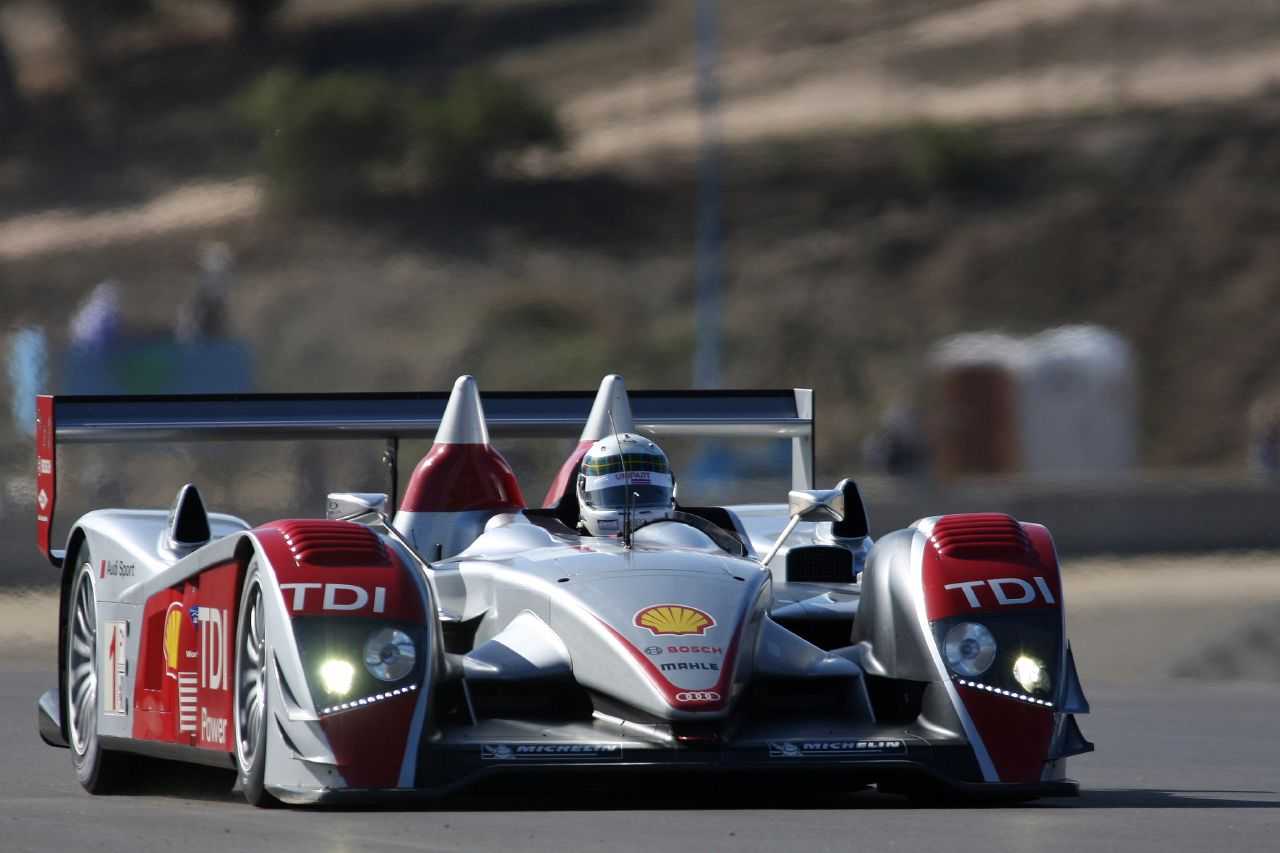
Allan McNish en route to a victory at Laguna Seca in the #1 Audi R10 TDI

The 2007 Monterey Sports Car Championships was the 12th and final race of the 2007 American Le Mans Series season. It took place at Mazda Raceway Laguna Seca, California on October 20, 2007.

== Official results ==
Class winners in bold. Cars failing to complete 70% of winner's distance marked as Not Classified (NC).

Pos	Class	No	Team	Drivers	Chassis	Tyre	Laps
Pos	Class	No	Team	Drivers	Engine	Tyre	Laps
1	**LMP1**	**1**	**(United States) Audi Sport North America**	**(Italy) Rinaldo Capello (United Kingdom) Allan McNish**	**Audi R10 TDI**	M	**157**
1	**LMP1**	**1**	**(United States) Audi Sport North America**	**(Italy) Rinaldo Capello (United Kingdom) Allan McNish**	**Audi TDI 5.5L Turbo V12 (Diesel)**	M	**157**
2	**LMP2**	**7**	**(United States) Penske Racing**	**(France) Romain Dumas (Germany) Timo Bernhard**	**Porsche RS Spyder Evo**	M	**157**
2	**LMP2**	**7**	**(United States) Penske Racing**	**(France) Romain Dumas (Germany) Timo Bernhard**	**Porsche MR6 3.4L V8**	M	**157**
3	LMP1	2	(United States) Audi Sport North America	(Germany) Mike Rockenfeller (Germany) Marco Werner	Audi R10 TDI	M	157
3	LMP1	2	(United States) Audi Sport North America	(Germany) Mike Rockenfeller (Germany) Marco Werner	Audi TDI 5.5L Turbo V12 (Diesel)	M	157
4	LMP2	6	(United States) Penske Racing	(Germany) Sascha Maassen (Australia) Ryan Briscoe	Porsche RS Spyder Evo	M	157
4	LMP2	6	(United States) Penske Racing	(Germany) Sascha Maassen (Australia) Ryan Briscoe	Porsche MR6 3.4L V8	M	157
5	LMP2	15	(Mexico) Lowe's Fernández Racing	(Mexico) Adrian Fernández (Mexico) Luis Diaz	Lola B06/43	M	157
5	LMP2	15	(Mexico) Lowe's Fernández Racing	(Mexico) Adrian Fernández (Mexico) Luis Diaz	Acura AL7R 3.4L V8	M	157
6	LMP2	26	(United States) Andretti Green Racing	(United States) Bryan Herta (Brazil) Tony Kanaan	Acura ARX-01a	M	157
6	LMP2	26	(United States) Andretti Green Racing	(United States) Bryan Herta (Brazil) Tony Kanaan	Acura AL7R 3.4L V8	M	157
7	LMP2	20	(United States) Dyson Racing	(United States) Chris Dyson (United Kingdom) Guy Smith	Porsche RS Spyder Evo	M	157
7	LMP2	20	(United States) Dyson Racing	(United States) Chris Dyson (United Kingdom) Guy Smith	Porsche MR6 3.4L V8	M	157
8	LMP2	16	(United States) Dyson Racing	(United States) Butch Leitzinger (United Kingdom) Andy Wallace	Porsche RS Spyder Evo	M	156
8	LMP2	16	(United States) Dyson Racing	(United States) Butch Leitzinger (United Kingdom) Andy Wallace	Porsche MR6 3.4L V8	M	156
9	LMP1	88	(United Kingdom) Creation Autosportif	(United Kingdom) Jamie Campbell-Walter (Switzerland) Harold Primat	Creation CA07	D	154
9	LMP1	88	(United Kingdom) Creation Autosportif	(United Kingdom) Jamie Campbell-Walter (Switzerland) Harold Primat	Judd GV5.5 S2 5.5L V10	D	154
10	LMP1	10	(United Kingdom) Arena Motorsports International	(United Kingdom) Tom Chilton (United Kingdom) Darren Manning	Zytek 07S	M	153
10	LMP1	10	(United Kingdom) Arena Motorsports International	(United Kingdom) Tom Chilton (United Kingdom) Darren Manning	Zytek 2ZG408 4.0L V8	M	153
11	**GT1**	**4**	**(United States) Corvette Racing**	**(United Kingdom) Oliver Gavin (Monaco) Olivier Beretta**	**Chevrolet Corvette C6.R**	M	**150**
11	**GT1**	**4**	**(United States) Corvette Racing**	**(United Kingdom) Oliver Gavin (Monaco) Olivier Beretta**	**Chevrolet LS7-R 7.0L V8**	M	**150**
12	GT1	3	(United States) Corvette Racing	(United States) Johnny O'Connell (Denmark) Jan Magnussen	Chevrolet Corvette C6.R	M	150
12	GT1	3	(United States) Corvette Racing	(United States) Johnny O'Connell (Denmark) Jan Magnussen	Chevrolet LS7-R 7.0L V8	M	150
13	**GT2**	**62**	**(United States) Risi Competizione**	**(Finland) Mika Salo (Brazil) Jaime Melo**	**Ferrari F430GT**	M	**146**
13	**GT2**	**62**	**(United States) Risi Competizione**	**(Finland) Mika Salo (Brazil) Jaime Melo**	**Ferrari 4.0L V8**	M	**146**
14	GT2	71	(United States) Tafel Racing	(Germany) Wolf Henzler (Germany) Dominik Farnbacher	Porsche 997 GT3-RSR	M	146
14	GT2	71	(United States) Tafel Racing	(Germany) Wolf Henzler (Germany) Dominik Farnbacher	Porsche 3.8L Flat-6	M	146
15	GT2	18	(United States) Rahal Letterman Racing	(United States) Tommy Milner (Germany) Ralf Kelleners	Porsche 997 GT3-RSR	M	145
15	GT2	18	(United States) Rahal Letterman Racing	(United States) Tommy Milner (Germany) Ralf Kelleners	Porsche 3.8L Flat-6	M	145
16	GT2	45	(United States) Flying Lizard Motorsports	(United States) Johannes van Overbeek (Germany) Jörg Bergmeister	Porsche 997 GT3-RSR	M	145
16	GT2	45	(United States) Flying Lizard Motorsports	(United States) Johannes van Overbeek (Germany) Jörg Bergmeister	Porsche 3.8L Flat-6	M	145
17	LMP1	06	(United States) Team Cytosport	(United States) Greg Pickett (Germany) Klaus Graf	Lola B06/10	D	144
17	LMP1	06	(United States) Team Cytosport	(United States) Greg Pickett (Germany) Klaus Graf	AER P32T 4.0L Turbo V8	D	144
18	GT2	54	(United States) Team Trans Sport Racing	(United States) Terry Borcheller (United States) Tim Pappas	Porsche 997 GT3-RSR	Y	143
18	GT2	54	(United States) Team Trans Sport Racing	(United States) Terry Borcheller (United States) Tim Pappas	Porsche 3.8L Flat-6	Y	143
19	GT2	21	(United States) Panoz Team PTG	(United States) Bill Auberlen (United States) Joey Hand	Panoz Esperante GT-LM	Y	139
19	GT2	21	(United States) Panoz Team PTG	(United States) Bill Auberlen (United States) Joey Hand	Ford (Élan) 5.0L V8	Y	139
20	GT2	44	(United States) Flying Lizard Motorsports	(United States) Darren Law (United States) Seth Neiman (United States) Lonnie Pechnik	Porsche 997 GT3-RSR	M	139
20	GT2	44	(United States) Flying Lizard Motorsports	(United States) Darren Law (United States) Seth Neiman (United States) Lonnie Pechnik	Porsche 3.8L Flat-6	M	139
21	GT2	61	(United States) Risi Competizione (United States) Krohn Racing	(United States) Tracy Krohn (Sweden) Niclas Jönsson	Ferrari F430GT	M	136
21	GT2	61	(United States) Risi Competizione (United States) Krohn Racing	(United States) Tracy Krohn (Sweden) Niclas Jönsson	Ferrari 4.0L V8	M	136
22	GT2	11	(United States) Primetime Race Group	(United States) Joel Feinberg (United States) Chapman Ducote	Dodge Viper Competition Coupe	M	136
22	GT2	11	(United States) Primetime Race Group	(United States) Joel Feinberg (United States) Chapman Ducote	Dodge 8.3L V10	M	136
23	GT2	53	(United States) Robertson Racing	(United States) David Robertson (United States) Andrea Robertson (United States) David Murry	Panoz Esperante GT-LM	D	135
23	GT2	53	(United States) Robertson Racing	(United States) David Robertson (United States) Andrea Robertson (United States) David Murry	Ford (Élan) 5.0L V8	D	135
24	LMP2	8	(United States) B-K Motorsports (Japan) Mazdaspeed	(United States) Jamie Bach (United Kingdom) Ben Devlin	Lola B07/46	K	133
24	LMP2	8	(United States) B-K Motorsports (Japan) Mazdaspeed	(United States) Jamie Bach (United Kingdom) Ben Devlin	Mazda MZR-R 2.0L Turbo I4	K	133
25	GT2	73	(United States) Tafel Racing	(United States) Jim Tafel (United States) Nathan Swartzbaugh (Denmark) Lars-Erik Nielsen	Porsche 997 GT3-RSR	M	117
25	GT2	73	(United States) Tafel Racing	(United States) Jim Tafel (United States) Nathan Swartzbaugh (Denmark) Lars-Erik Nielsen	Porsche 3.8L Flat-6	M	117
26 DNF	LMP2	5	(United Kingdom) Zytek Motorsports	(Germany) Stefan Mücke (Japan) Hayanari Shimoda	Zytek 07S/2	M	112
26 DNF	LMP2	5	(United Kingdom) Zytek Motorsports	(Germany) Stefan Mücke (Japan) Hayanari Shimoda	Zytek ZG348 3.4L V8	M	112
27 DNF	LMP1	12	(United States) Autocon Motorsports	(United States) Chris McMurry (United States) Bryan Willman (Canada) Tony Burgess	Creation CA06/H	D	92
27 DNF	LMP1	12	(United States) Autocon Motorsports	(United States) Chris McMurry (United States) Bryan Willman (Canada) Tony Burgess	Judd GV5 5.0L V10	D	92
28 DNF	LMP2	9	(United States) Highcroft Racing	(Australia) David Brabham (Sweden) Stefan Johansson (United Kingdom) Robbie Kerr	Acura ARX-01a	M	89
28 DNF	LMP2	9	(United States) Highcroft Racing	(Australia) David Brabham (Sweden) Stefan Johansson (United Kingdom) Robbie Kerr	Acura AL7R 3.4L V8	M	89
29 DNF	LMP1	37	(United States) Intersport Racing	(United States) Jon Field (United States) Clint Field (United States) Richard Berry	Lola B06/10	D	40
29 DNF	LMP1	37	(United States) Intersport Racing	(United States) Jon Field (United States) Clint Field (United States) Richard Berry	AER P32T 4.0L Turbo V8	D	40
30 DNF	GT2	31	(United States) Petersen Motorsports (United States) White Lightning Racing	(United Kingdom) Peter Dumbreck (Germany) Lucas Luhr	Ferrari F430GT	M	31
30 DNF	GT2	31	(United States) Petersen Motorsports (United States) White Lightning Racing	(United Kingdom) Peter Dumbreck (Germany) Lucas Luhr	Ferrari 4.0L V8	M	31

== Statistics ==
- Pole Position - #6 Penske Racing - 1:10.528
- Fastest Lap - #6 Penske Racing - 1:12.127

American Le Mans Series
Previous race: 2007 Petit Le Mans	2007 season	Next race: None
