= Stuart Hall (racing driver) =

British racing driver

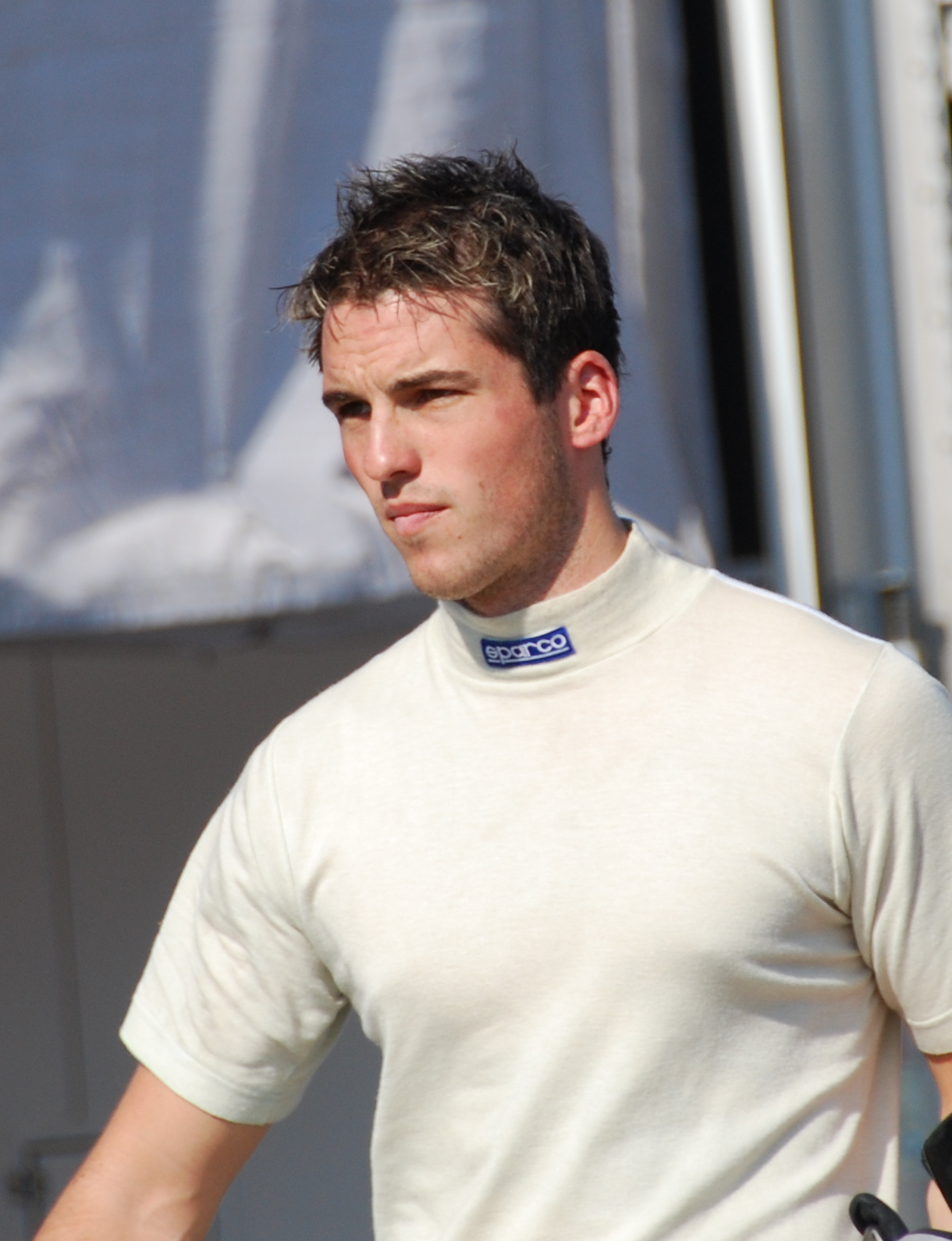
- Hall during the 2008 Petit Le Mans
- Nationality: British
- Born: 18 October 1984 (age 42) Chelmsford, England

FIA World Endurance Championship career
- Debut season: 2012
- Current team: Aston Martin Racing
- Categorisation: FIA Gold (until 2012, 2014–2015); FIA Silver (2013, 2016–)
- Car number: 96

Previous series
- 2016 2013 2012–2013 2009–2011 2008 2008 2007–2009 2006 2004 2004–05 2002–03 2000: Britcar; WEC; Blancpain Endurance Series; British GT Championship; FIA GT3 European Championship; American Le Mans Series; Le Mans Series; British F3; Formula Renault 2000 Eurocup; Formula Renault UK; British Formula Ford; T Cars

Championship titles
- 2013 2004 2000: FIA Endurance Trophy LMGTE Am; Formula Renault UK Winter Series; T Cars

Stuart Hall (born 18 October 1984 in Chelmsford) is a British former racing driver. He is the 2013 GTEAM World Endurance Champion and has competed at the 24 Hours of Le Mans for teams including Aston Martin Racing.

== Career ==
=== Single-seaters ===
After winning the T Cars championship in 2000, Hall moved into single-seaters. In 2002, he finished ninth in the British Formula Ford Championship, before coming fourth in that year's Winter Series, where he won two of the four races. The following year he only started 12 of the 20 races in the series, concentrating instead on his A level studies. After debuting in Formula Renault in the 2003 UK Winter Series, he raced full-time in Formula Renault UK in 2004. Driving for Fortec Motorsport, he finished seventh overall with three podium finishes. He then won the Winter Series, winning one of the four races. He remained in Formula Renault UK in 2005, but slipped to eighth overall although he had increased his podium tally to five.

2006 saw Hall move up to British Formula Three. He raced the first five race weekends with Fortec, before missing the sixth round at Spa-Francorchamps and returning with T-Sport. He finished the year 13th in the standings.

=== Sportscars ===
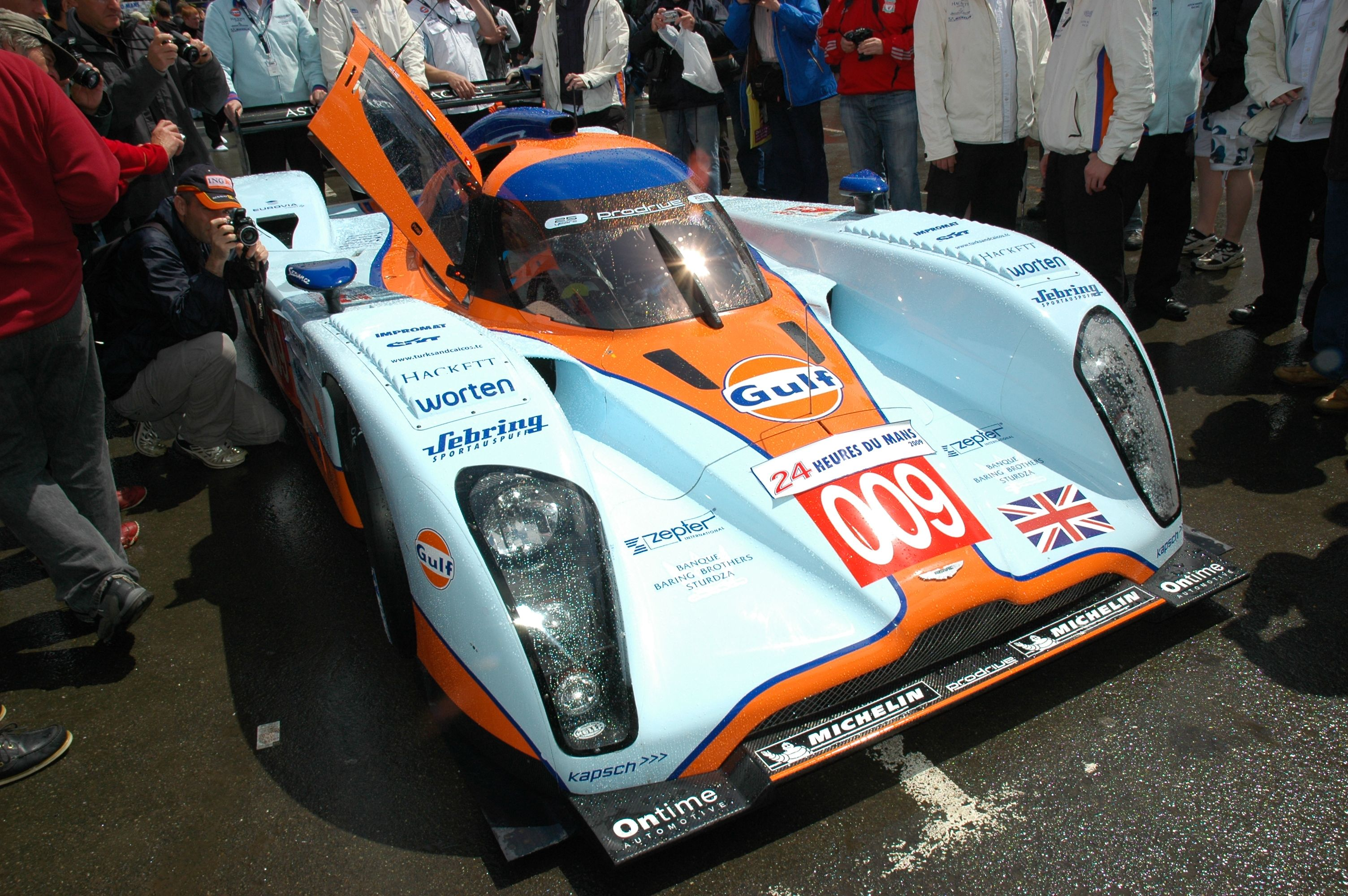
Hall's Lola-Aston Martin at scrutineering for the 2009 Le Mans 24 Hours.

Hall switched to sportscars in 2007, contesting the Le Mans Series in Rollcentre Racing's Pescarolo-Judd LMP1, though he raced the season finale in Brazil with the Creation Autosportif team. He finished fifth in the drivers' standings, and also finished fourth at the 24 Hours of Le Mans with Rollcentre. He drove for Creation in 2008, finishing seventh in the Le Mans Series and 11th at Le Mans. He joined Aston Martin Racing in 2009, contesting the 24 Hours, from which his car retired, and the final two rounds of the Le Mans Series.

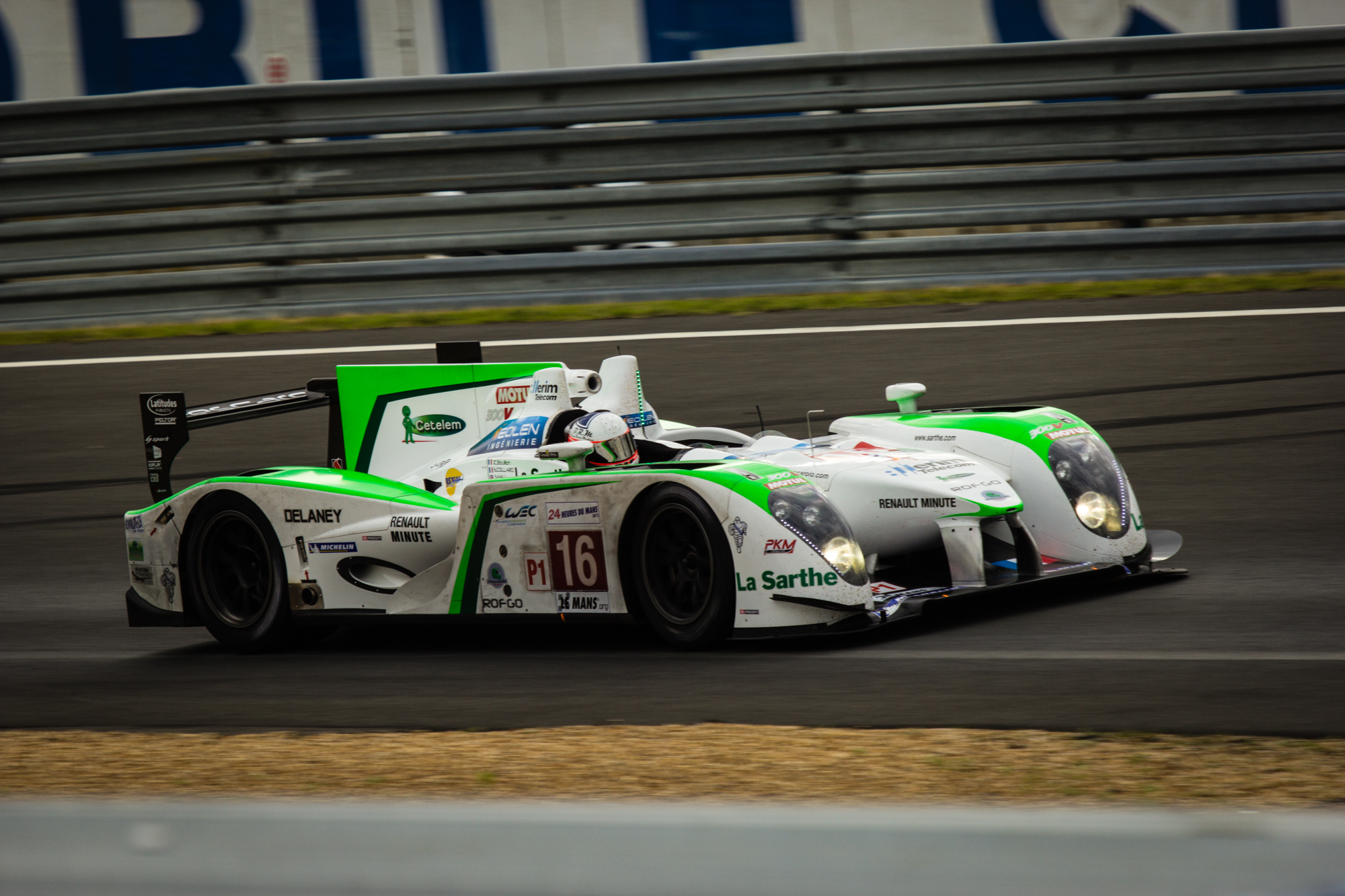
Hall racing for Pescarolo in 2012.

Hall made just a few British GT appearances in 2010–11, before signing to race the new Pescarolo 03 at the 2012 24 Hours of Le Mans. In 2013, Hall drove a Vantage V8 GTE for Aston Martin Racing in the LMGTE Am class of the FIA World Endurance Championship. He won it together with Jamie Campbell-Walter in 2013 but spent two further seasons in that car.

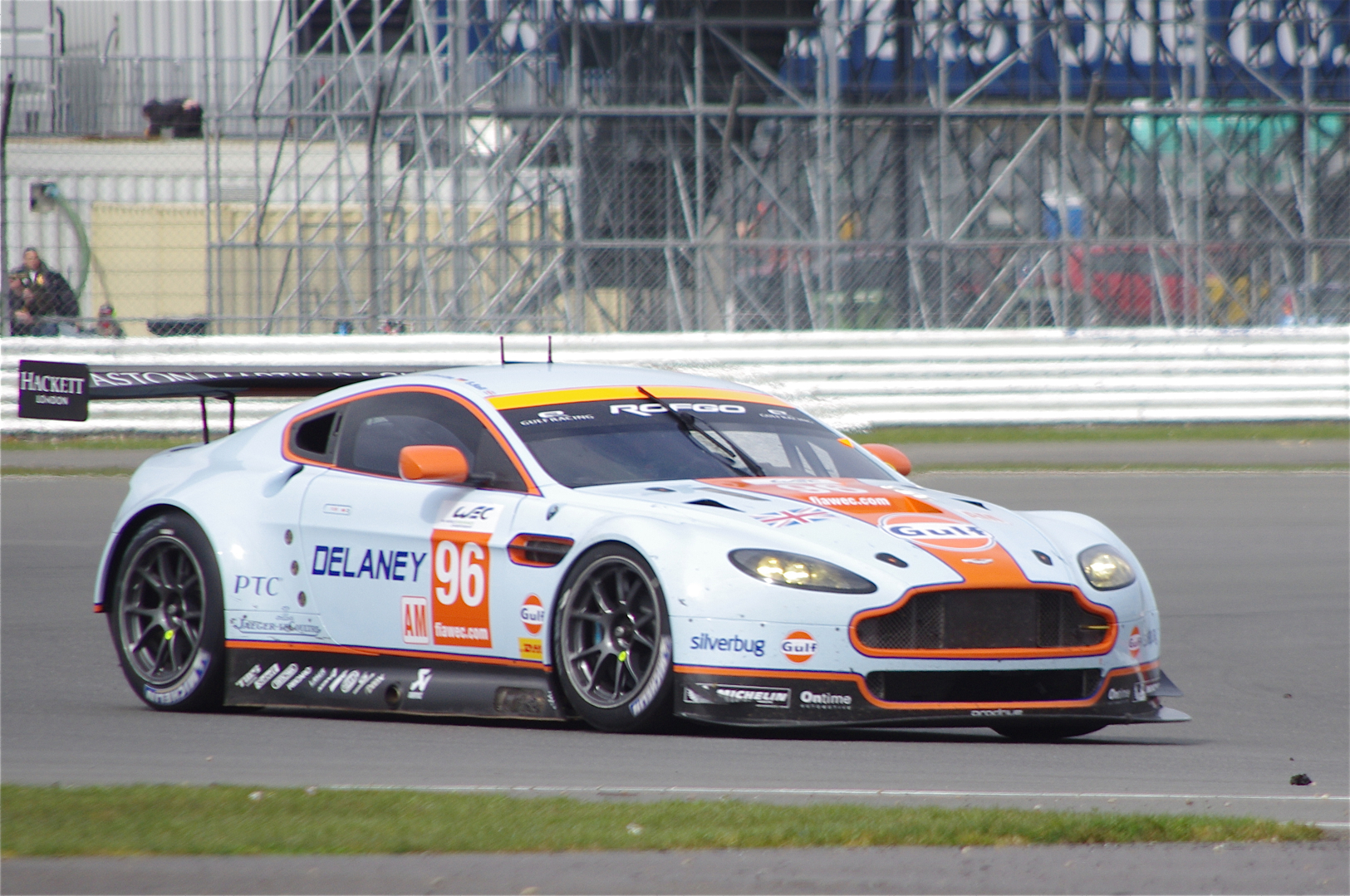
Hall returned to Aston Martin in the GTE Am class in 2013.

In 2015, Hall was also runner up in the GTC class of the European Le Mans Series with AF Corse in a Ferrari 458 GT3.

Between 2016 and 2018, Hall drove a Mercedes AMG GT GT3 for ROFGO Racing earning victory in the Silverstone 12 hours during that period.

Hall spent three seasons in the Blancpain Endurance Series between 2019 and 2021 with GPX Racing and Team WRT respectively.

In 2022, Hall won the GT4 Class of the British Endurance Championship with MKH Racing, a team that he lends his name too.

=== Historic Racing ===
Hall regularly competes in Historic Racing. Driving the famous cars from the ROFGO Collection and GPX Historic Collection.

Hall has won the Monaco Historic Grand Prix three times, once in 2016 in a McLaren M19 and twice in 2022 in a McLaren M19 and M23. He has also won numerous Historic events around the world including venues in Dubai, the USA and Europe.

Hall has also competed in the Le Mans Classic, most recently in an Aston Martin Vantage GT2 in 2022.

== Racing record ==
=== 24 Hours of Le Mans results ===
| Year | Team | Co-Drivers | Car | Class | Laps | Pos. | Class Pos. |
|---|---|---|---|---|---|---|---|
| 2007 | (United Kingdom) Rollcentre Racing | (Portugal) João Barbosa (United Kingdom) Martin Short | Pescarolo 01-Judd | LMP1 | 347 | 4th | 4th |
| 2008 | (United Kingdom) Creation Autosportif | (United Kingdom) Johnny Mowlem (Belgium) Marc Goossens | Creation CA07-AIM | LMP1 | 316 | 24th | 11th |
| 2009 | (United Kingdom) Aston Martin Racing | (Switzerland) Harold Primat (Netherlands) Peter Kox | Lola-Aston Martin B09/60 | LMP1 | 252 | DNF | DNF |
| 2012 | (France) Pescarolo Team | (France) Emmanuel Collard | Pescarolo 03-Judd | LMP1 | 20 | DNF | DNF |
| 2013 | (United Kingdom) Aston Martin Racing | (United Kingdom) Jamie Campbell-Walter (Germany) Roald Goethe | Aston Martin Vantage GTE | GTE; Am | 301 | 30th | 6th |
| 2015 | (United Kingdom) Aston Martin Racing | (Italy) Francesco Castellacci (Germany) Roald Goethe | Aston Martin Vantage GTE | GTE; Am | 187 | DNF | DNF |

=== Complete FIA World Endurance Championship results ===
| Year | Entrant | Class | Car | Engine | 1 | 2 | 3 | 4 | 5 | 6 | 7 | 8 | Rank | Points |
|---|---|---|---|---|---|---|---|---|---|---|---|---|---|---|
| 2012 | Pescarolo Team | LMP1 | Pescarolo 03 | Judd DB 3.4 L V8 | SEB | SPA | LMS; Ret | | | | | | 94th | 0.5 |
| 2012 | Aston Martin Racing | LMGTE Am | Aston Martin Vantage GTE | Aston Martin 4.5 L V8 | | | | SIL; 4 | SÃO | BHR | FUJ | SHA | 94th | 0.5 |
| 2013 | Aston Martin Racing | LMGTE Am | Aston Martin Vantage GTE | Aston Martin 4.5 L V8 | SIL; 4 | SPA; 4 | LMS; 5 | SÃO; 1 | COA; 1 | FUJ; 2 | SHA; 3 | BHR; 5 | 1st | 129 |
| 2015 | Aston Martin Racing | LMGTE Am | Aston Martin Vantage GTE | Aston Martin 4.5 L V8 | SIL; 4 | SPA; 6 | LMS; Ret | NÜR; 7 | COA; 6 | FUJ; 7 | SHA; 6 | BHR; 7 | 9th | 54 |

=== Britcar 24 Hour results ===
| Year | Team | Co-Drivers | Car | Car No. | Class | Laps | Pos. | Class Pos. |
|---|---|---|---|---|---|---|---|---|
| 2007 | (United Kingdom) Rollcentre Racing | (United Kingdom) Andy Neate (United Kingdom) Martin Short | Mosler MT900R GT3 | 2 | GT3 | 567 | 2nd | 2nd |
| 2010 | (United Kingdom) Vantage Racing | (United Kingdom) Tom Black (United Kingdom) Alan Bonner | Aston Martin V8 Vantage N24 | 52 | 3 | 521 | 11th | 7th |
| 2011 | (United Kingdom) Vantage Racing | (United Kingdom) Tom Black (United Kingdom) Alan Bonner | Aston Martin V8 Vantage N24 | 50 | 3 | 362 | 38th/DNF | 16th/DNF |

Sporting positions
| Preceded by none | FIA Endurance Trophy for LMGTE Am Drivers; 2013 with: Jamie Campbell-Walter | Succeeded by Kristian Poulsen; David Heinemeier Hansson |
