= 2004 1000 km of Spa =

Sports car endurance race in Belgium

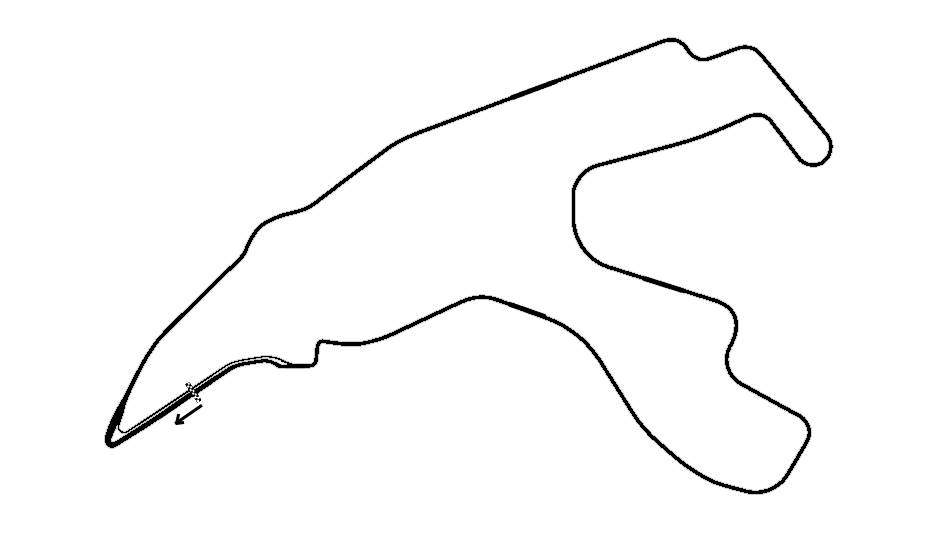
Layout of the Circuit de Spa-Francorchamps (2004–2006)

The 2004 1000 km of Spa was the fourth and final round of the 2004 Le Mans Series season, held at the Circuit de Spa-Francorchamps, Belgium. It was run on September 12, 2004.

== Official results ==
Class winners in bold. Cars failing to complete 70% of winner's distance marked as Not Classified (NC).

Pos	Class	No	Team	Drivers	Chassis	Tyre	Laps
Pos	Class	No	Team	Drivers	Engine	Tyre	Laps
1	**LMP1**	**88**	**(United Kingdom) Audi Sport UK Team Veloqx**	**(United Kingdom) Johnny Herbert (United Kingdom) Jamie Davies**	**Audi R8**	MI	**144**
1	**LMP1**	**88**	**(United Kingdom) Audi Sport UK Team Veloqx**	**(United Kingdom) Johnny Herbert (United Kingdom) Jamie Davies**	**Audi 3.6L Turbo V8**	MI	**144**
2	LMP1	5	(Japan) Team Goh	(Italy) Rinaldo Capello (Japan) Seiji Ara	Audi R8	MI	143
2	LMP1	5	(Japan) Team Goh	(Italy) Rinaldo Capello (Japan) Seiji Ara	Audi 3.6L Turbo V8	MI	143
3	LMP1	3	(United Kingdom) Creation Autosportif	(France) Nicolas Minassian (United Kingdom) Jamie Campbell-Walter	DBA 03S	D	139
3	LMP1	3	(United Kingdom) Creation Autosportif	(France) Nicolas Minassian (United Kingdom) Jamie Campbell-Walter	Zytek ZG348 3.4L V8	D	139
4	**LMP2**	**13**	**(France) Courage Compétition**	**(France) Jonathan Cochet (Switzerland) Alexander Frei (United Kingdom) Sam Hancock**	**Courage C65**	MI	**137**
4	**LMP2**	**13**	**(France) Courage Compétition**	**(France) Jonathan Cochet (Switzerland) Alexander Frei (United Kingdom) Sam Hancock**	**MG (AER) XP20 2.0L Turbo I4**	MI	**137**
5	LMP1	69	(United Kingdom) Team Jota	(United Kingdom) Sam Hignett (United Kingdom) John Stack (Italy) Gianni Collini	Zytek 04S	D	136
5	LMP1	69	(United Kingdom) Team Jota	(United Kingdom) Sam Hignett (United Kingdom) John Stack (Italy) Gianni Collini	Zytek ZG348 3.4L V8	D	136
6	LMP1	7	(United Kingdom) RML	(United Kingdom) Mike Newton (Brazil) Thomas Erdos (Portugal) Miguel Ramos	MG-Lola EX257	D	136
6	LMP1	7	(United Kingdom) RML	(United Kingdom) Mike Newton (Brazil) Thomas Erdos (Portugal) Miguel Ramos	MG (AER) XP20 2.0L Turbo I4	D	136
7	**GTS**	**86**	**(France) Larbre Compétition**	**(France) Christophe Bouchut (Portugal) Pedro Lamy (Switzerland) Steve Zacchia**	**Ferrari 550-GTS Maranello**	MI	**132**
7	**GTS**	**86**	**(France) Larbre Compétition**	**(France) Christophe Bouchut (Portugal) Pedro Lamy (Switzerland) Steve Zacchia**	**Ferrari 5.9L V12**	MI	**132**
8	LMP2	26	(France) Paul Belmondo Racing	(France) Paul Belmondo (France) Claude-Yves Gosselin (Belgium) Wim Eyckmans	Courage C65	MI	129
8	LMP2	26	(France) Paul Belmondo Racing	(France) Paul Belmondo (France) Claude-Yves Gosselin (Belgium) Wim Eyckmans	MG (AER) XP20 2.0L Turbo I4	MI	129
9	**GT**	**85**	**(Germany) Freisinger Motorsport**	**(Monaco) Stéphane Ortelli (France) Emmanuel Collard**	**Porsche 911 GT3-RSR**	D	**129**
9	**GT**	**85**	**(Germany) Freisinger Motorsport**	**(Monaco) Stéphane Ortelli (France) Emmanuel Collard**	**Porsche 3.6L Flat-6**	D	**129**
10	GTS	87	(France) Larbre Compétition	(Czech Republic) Tomáš Enge (Czech Republic) Robert Pergl (France) Patrice Goueslard	Ferrari 550-GTS Maranello	MI	129
10	GTS	87	(France) Larbre Compétition	(Czech Republic) Tomáš Enge (Czech Republic) Robert Pergl (France) Patrice Goueslard	Ferrari 5.9L V12	MI	129
11	LMP2	36	(France) Welter Racing	(France) Sylvain Boulay (France) Jean-Bernard Bouvet (France) Jean-René de Fournoux	WR LMP2	MI	129
11	LMP2	36	(France) Welter Racing	(France) Sylvain Boulay (France) Jean-Bernard Bouvet (France) Jean-René de Fournoux	Peugeot 3.4L V6	MI	129
12	GTS	62	(Netherlands) Barron Connor Racing	(Netherlands) Mike Hezemans (Switzerland) Jean-Denis Délétraz	Ferrari 575-GTC Maranello	P	128
12	GTS	62	(Netherlands) Barron Connor Racing	(Netherlands) Mike Hezemans (Switzerland) Jean-Denis Délétraz	Ferrari 6.0L V12	P	128
13	GT	93	(United Kingdom) Cirtek Motorsport	(United Kingdom) Adam Jones (Germany) Sascha Maassen	Porsche 911 GT3-RSR	D	127
13	GT	93	(United Kingdom) Cirtek Motorsport	(United Kingdom) Adam Jones (Germany) Sascha Maassen	Porsche 3.6L Flat-6	D	127
14	LMP1	11	(France) Larbre Compétition	(France) Olivier Dupard (France) Sébastien Dumez (France) Jean-Luc Blanchemain	Panoz GTP	MI	127
14	LMP1	11	(France) Larbre Compétition	(France) Olivier Dupard (France) Sébastien Dumez (France) Jean-Luc Blanchemain	Ford (Élan) 6L8 6.0L V8	MI	127
15	GT	80	(United Kingdom) Sebah Automotive	(France) Xavier Pompidou (Germany) Marc Lieb	Porsche 911 GT3-R	D	126
15	GT	80	(United Kingdom) Sebah Automotive	(France) Xavier Pompidou (Germany) Marc Lieb	Porsche 3.6L Flat-6	D	126
16	GT	81	(Germany) Farnbacher Racing	(United States) Patrick Long (Denmark) Lars-Erik Nielsen (Denmark) Thorkild Thyrring	Porsche 911 GT3-RSR	D	126
16	GT	81	(Germany) Farnbacher Racing	(United States) Patrick Long (Denmark) Lars-Erik Nielsen (Denmark) Thorkild Thyrring	Porsche 3.6L Flat-6	D	126
17	LMP2	27	(United Kingdom) Tracsport	(United Kingdom) John Ingram (United Kingdom) John Gaw (United Kingdom) Rick Pearson	Lola B2K/40	D	126
17	LMP2	27	(United Kingdom) Tracsport	(United Kingdom) John Ingram (United Kingdom) John Gaw (United Kingdom) Rick Pearson	Nissan (AER) VQL 3.0L V6	D	126
18	LMP2	32	(Italy) Lucchini Engineering	(Italy) Piergiuseppe Peroni (Italy) Mirko Savoldi (Italy) Filippo Francioni	Lucchini LMP2/04	P	125
18	LMP2	32	(Italy) Lucchini Engineering	(Italy) Piergiuseppe Peroni (Italy) Mirko Savoldi (Italy) Filippo Francioni	Judd XV675 3.4L V8	P	125
19	GT	70	(Monaco) JMB Racing	(Russia) Roman Rusinov (Brazil) Jaime Melo (Belgium) Bert Longin	Ferrari 360 Modena GT	D	125
19	GT	70	(Monaco) JMB Racing	(Russia) Roman Rusinov (Brazil) Jaime Melo (Belgium) Bert Longin	Ferrari 3.6L V8	D	125
20	GTS	61	(Netherlands) Barron Connor Racing	(Netherlands) John Bosch (United States) Danny Sullivan (Italy) Thomas Biagi	Ferrari 575-GTC Maranello	P	125
20	GTS	61	(Netherlands) Barron Connor Racing	(Netherlands) John Bosch (United States) Danny Sullivan (Italy) Thomas Biagi	Ferrari 6.0L V12	P	125
21	GTS	52	(United Kingdom) Graham Nash Motorsport	(United Kingdom) Phillip Bennett (United Kingdom) David Leslie (United Kingdom) Paul Whight	Saleen S7-R	D	123
21	GTS	52	(United Kingdom) Graham Nash Motorsport	(United Kingdom) Phillip Bennett (United Kingdom) David Leslie (United Kingdom) Paul Whight	Ford 6.9L V8	D	123
22	GT	90	(Germany) T2M Motorsport	(Belgium) Vanina Ickx (France) Thierry Rabineau (France) Christophe Tinseau	Porsche 911 GT3-RS	Y	123
22	GT	90	(Germany) T2M Motorsport	(Belgium) Vanina Ickx (France) Thierry Rabineau (France) Christophe Tinseau	Porsche 3.6L Flat-6	Y	123
23	GT	75	(Italy) Autorlando Sport	(United States) Liz Halliday (United Kingdom) Piers Masarati	Porsche 911 GT3-RS	P	123
23	GT	75	(Italy) Autorlando Sport	(United States) Liz Halliday (United Kingdom) Piers Masarati	Porsche 3.6L Flat-6	P	123
24	GT	84	(Germany) Seikel Motorsport	(Canada) Tony Burgess (United States) Philip Collin (United Kingdom) Graeme Mundy	Porsche 911 GT3-RS	Y	122
24	GT	84	(Germany) Seikel Motorsport	(Canada) Tony Burgess (United States) Philip Collin (United Kingdom) Graeme Mundy	Porsche 3.6L Flat-6	Y	122
25	GT	96	(United Kingdom) IN2 Racing	(Denmark) Juan Barazi (Netherlands) Michael Vergers (United Kingdom) Nick Dudfield	Porsche 911 GT3-RSR	D	121
25	GT	96	(United Kingdom) IN2 Racing	(Denmark) Juan Barazi (Netherlands) Michael Vergers (United Kingdom) Nick Dudfield	Porsche 3.6L Flat-6	D	121
26	LMP2	99	(France) Pierre Bruneau	(France) Pierre Bruneau (France) Marc Rostan	Pilbeam MP91	MI	121
26	LMP2	99	(France) Pierre Bruneau	(France) Pierre Bruneau (France) Marc Rostan	JPX (Mader) 3.4L V6	MI	121
27	GT	76	(Italy) Autorlando Sport	(United States) Jim Michaelian (Italy) Mauro Casadei (Switzerland) François Labhardt	Porsche 911 GT3-RSR	P	120
27	GT	76	(Italy) Autorlando Sport	(United States) Jim Michaelian (Italy) Mauro Casadei (Switzerland) François Labhardt	Porsche 3.6L Flat-6	P	120
28	GT	92	(United Kingdom) Cirtek Motorsport	(United Kingdom) Andrew Kirkaldy (New Zealand) Rob Wilson (Italy) Maurizio Fabris	Ferrari 360 Modena GTC	D	111
28	GT	92	(United Kingdom) Cirtek Motorsport	(United Kingdom) Andrew Kirkaldy (New Zealand) Rob Wilson (Italy) Maurizio Fabris	Ferrari 3.6L V8	D	111
29 DNF	GT	91	(United Kingdom) Racesport Salisbury	(United Kingdom) John Hartshorne (United Kingdom) Steve Hyde (United Kingdom) Adam Sharpe	TVR Tuscan T400R	D	105
29 DNF	GT	91	(United Kingdom) Racesport Salisbury	(United Kingdom) John Hartshorne (United Kingdom) Steve Hyde (United Kingdom) Adam Sharpe	TVR Speed Six 4.0L I6	D	105
30 DNF	LMP2	31	(Switzerland) Equipe Palmyr	(France) Grégory Fargier (Switzerland) Christophe Ricard (Switzerland) Philippe Favre	Lucchini SR2000	D	63
30 DNF	LMP2	31	(Switzerland) Equipe Palmyr	(France) Grégory Fargier (Switzerland) Christophe Ricard (Switzerland) Philippe Favre	Alfa Romeo 3.0L V6	D	63
31 DNF	GTS	59	(Germany) Vitaphone Racing (Germany) Konrad Motorsport	(Germany) Uwe Alzen (Germany) Michael Bartels (Austria) Franz Konrad	Saleen S7-R	P	73
31 DNF	GTS	59	(Germany) Vitaphone Racing (Germany) Konrad Motorsport	(Germany) Uwe Alzen (Germany) Michael Bartels (Austria) Franz Konrad	Ford 6.9L V8	P	73
32 DNF	LMP2	35	(Belgium) G-Force Racing	(Belgium) Sylvie Delcour (Belgium) Frank Hahn (France) Philippe Haezebrouck	Pilbeam MP84	D	70
32 DNF	LMP2	35	(Belgium) G-Force Racing	(Belgium) Sylvie Delcour (Belgium) Frank Hahn (France) Philippe Haezebrouck	Nissan (AER) VQL 3.0L V6	D	70
33 DNF	LMP1	14	(United Kingdom) Team Nasamax	(France) Romain Dumas (Canada) Robbie Stirling (South Africa) Werner Lupberger	Nasamax DM139 (Reynard)	MI	68
33 DNF	LMP1	14	(United Kingdom) Team Nasamax	(France) Romain Dumas (Canada) Robbie Stirling (South Africa) Werner Lupberger	Judd GV5 5.0L V10 (Bio-ethanol)	MI	68
34 DNF	GT	79	(France) Thierry Perrier (France) Perspective Racing	(United Kingdom) Tim Sugden (United Kingdom) Ian Khan (Belgium) Michel Heydens	Porsche 911 GT3-R	D	53
34 DNF	GT	79	(France) Thierry Perrier (France) Perspective Racing	(United Kingdom) Tim Sugden (United Kingdom) Ian Khan (Belgium) Michel Heydens	Porsche 3.6L Flat-6	D	53
35 DNF	LMP1	6	(United Kingdom) Rollcentre Racing	(United Kingdom) Martin Short (United Kingdom) Patrick Pearce (Portugal) João Barbosa	Dallara SP1	D	49
35 DNF	LMP1	6	(United Kingdom) Rollcentre Racing	(United Kingdom) Martin Short (United Kingdom) Patrick Pearce (Portugal) João Barbosa	Judd GV4 4.0L V10	D	49
36 DNF	GT	77	(Japan) Choro Q Racing Team	(Japan) Haruki Kurosawa (Japan) Kazuyushi Nishizawa	Porsche 911 GT3-RSR	Y	38
36 DNF	GT	77	(Japan) Choro Q Racing Team	(Japan) Haruki Kurosawa (Japan) Kazuyushi Nishizawa	Porsche 3.6L Flat-6	Y	38
37 DNF	LMP1	8	(United Kingdom) Audi Sport UK Team Veloqx	(United Kingdom) Allan McNish (Switzerland) Pierre Kaffer	Audi R8	MI	23
37 DNF	LMP1	8	(United Kingdom) Audi Sport UK Team Veloqx	(United Kingdom) Allan McNish (Switzerland) Pierre Kaffer	Audi 3.6L Turbo V8	MI	23
38 DNF	GT	41	(United Kingdom) RSR Racing	(United Kingdom) Jonny Kane (United Kingdom) Warren Hughes (United Kingdom) Lawrence Tomlinson	TVR Tuscan T400R	D	19
38 DNF	GT	41	(United Kingdom) RSR Racing	(United Kingdom) Jonny Kane (United Kingdom) Warren Hughes (United Kingdom) Lawrence Tomlinson	TVR Speed Six 4.0L I6	D	19
39 DNF	LMP1	20	(United Kingdom) Lister Racing	(United Kingdom) Justin Keen (Belgium) Marc Goossens	Lister Storm LMP	D	16
39 DNF	LMP1	20	(United Kingdom) Lister Racing	(United Kingdom) Justin Keen (Belgium) Marc Goossens	Chevrolet LS1 6.0L V8	D	16
40 DNF	GT	40	(United Kingdom) RSR Racing	(United Kingdom) Michael Caine (United Kingdom) Nigel Greensall (United Kingdom) Jonathan Coleman	TVR Tuscan T400R	D	10
40 DNF	GT	40	(United Kingdom) RSR Racing	(United Kingdom) Michael Caine (United Kingdom) Nigel Greensall (United Kingdom) Jonathan Coleman	TVR Speed Six 4.0L I6	D	10
41 DNF	LMP1	17	(France) Pescarolo Sport	(France) Jean-Marc Gounon (France) Soheil Ayari	Pescarolo C60	MI	9
41 DNF	LMP1	17	(France) Pescarolo Sport	(France) Jean-Marc Gounon (France) Soheil Ayari	Judd GV5 5.0L V10	MI	9

== Statistics ==
- Pole Position - #3 Creation Autosportf - 2:05.964
- Fastest Lap - #88 Audi Sport UK Team Veloqx - 2:06.626
- Average Speed - 167.205 km/h

Le Mans Series
Previous race: 2004 1000km of Silverstone	2004 season	Next race: None
