= 2008 Monterey Sports Car Championships =

Track map of Mazda Raceway Laguna Seca

The 2008 Monterey Sports Car Championships presented by Patrón was the eleventh and final round of the 2008 American Le Mans Series season. It took place at Mazda Raceway Laguna Seca, California on 18 October 2008. It was the first time the event had a sponsor in its name since the 2004 season.

== Report ==
=== Qualifying ===
The LMP2 category dominated qualifying, led by the four Acura teams who were able to qualify in the top five positions, led by David Brabham in the Highcroft Racing Acura on pole position. The Acura squads were broken up only by the #7 Penske Porsche which qualified third. In LMP1, the #1 Audi led that class but was only ninth overall in the standings. Among the Corvette teams, the #3 car once again earned pole over its teammate, while GT2 was led by Farnbacher-Loles' Porsche. Tafel Racing meanwhile led among Ferrari squads in third place within the class.

==== Qualifying result ====
Pole position winners in each class are marked in bold.

Pos	Class	Team	Qualifying Driver	Time
1	**LMP2**	**#9 Patrón Highcroft Racing**	**David Brabham**	**1:10.103**
2	LMP2	#15 Lowe's Fernández Racing	Luis Díaz	1:10.202
3	LMP2	#7 Penske Racing	Timo Bernhard	1:10.351
4	LMP2	#66 de Ferran Motorsports	Gil de Ferran	1:10.451
5	LMP2	#26 Andretti Green Racing	Tony Kanaan	1:10.567
6	LMP2	#6 Penske Racing	Sascha Maassen	1:10.586
7	LMP2	#5 Penske Motorsports, Inc.	Ryan Briscoe	1:10.606
8	LMP2	#16 Dyson Racing	Guy Smith	1:11.010
9	**LMP1**	**#1 Audi Sport North America**	**Emanuele Pirro**	**1:11.264**
10	LMP1	#2 Audi Sport North America	Lucas Luhr	1:11.825
11	LMP2	#20 Dyson Racing	Butch Leitzinger	1:12.089
12	LMP1	#48 Corsa Motorsports	Johnny Mowlem	1:12.819
13	LMP2	#8 B-K Motorsports	Ben Devlin	1:13.321
14	LMP1	#37 Intersport Racing	Jon Field	1:13.379
15	LMP1	#88 Creation Autosportif	Stephen Simpson	1:13.481
16	LMP1	#12 Autocon Motorsports	Chris McMurry	1:14.549
17	**GT1**	**#3 Corvette Racing**	**Jan Magnussen**	**1:19.291**
18	GT1	#4 Corvette Racing	Oliver Gavin	1:19.790
19	**GT2**	**#87 Farnbacher-Loles Motorsport**	**Dirk Werner**	**1:22.060**
20	GT2	#45 Flying Lizard Motorsports	Jörg Bergmeister	1:22.380
21	GT2	#71 Tafel Racing	Dominik Farnbacher	1:22.701
22	GT2	#46 Flying Lizard Motorsports	Patrick Pilet	1:22.869
23	GT2	#62 Risi Competizione	Mika Salo	1:22.962
24	GT2	#99 JMB Racing	Pierre Kaffer	1:23.243
25	GT2	#61 Risi Competizione	Niclas Jönsson	1:23.928
26	GT2	#21 Panoz Team PTG	Joey Hand	1:24.084
27	GT2	#18 VICI Racing	Nicky Pastorelli	1:24.111
28	GT2	#007 Drayson-Barwell	Jonny Cocker	1:24.626
29	GT2	#54 Black Swan Racing	Anthony Lazzaro	1:24.711
30	GT2	#40 Robertson Racing	David Murry	1:24.727
31	GT2	#73 Tafel Racing	Pierre Ehret	1:24.970
32	GT2	#11 Primetime Race Group	Chris Hall	1:26.124
33	GT2	#44 Flying Lizard Motorsports	Seth Neiman	1:26.704
34	LMP1	#10 ECO Racing	Did Not Participate	No Time

=== Race ===
The final round of the ALMS season was slowed by a total of twelve caution periods over the four-hour race distance, including four within the first hour alone. This allowed for a variety of pit strategies to come into place as teams chose to make their first pit stops during different caution periods. The Acura teams led early, but Audi was eventually able to take the overall lead, eventually completing the race first and second, led by the #2 car of Marco Werner and Lucas Luhr. In LMP2, Acura's also finished first and second, but the #7 Penske Porsche's finish of third was able to secure Porsche the Manufacturers Championship within the class by a single point.

In GT1, the #4 Corvette of Olivier Beretta and Oliver Gavin earned their third win of the season over their teammates, while the #71 Tafel Racing Ferrari secured its fourth victory in GT2 in 2008. The Risi Competizione Ferrari and Farnbacher-Loles Porsche completed the GT2 podium, while the PTG Panoz had a strong fourth-place finish a lap behind.

==== Race result ====
Class winners in bold. Cars failing to complete 70% of winner's distance marked as Not Classified (NC).

Pos	Class	No	Team	Drivers	Chassis	Tire	Laps
Pos	Class	No	Team	Drivers	Engine	Tire	Laps
1	**LMP1**	**2**	**(United States) Audi Sport North America**	**(Germany) Marco Werner (Germany) Lucas Luhr**	**Audi R10 TDI**	M	**145**
1	**LMP1**	**2**	**(United States) Audi Sport North America**	**(Germany) Marco Werner (Germany) Lucas Luhr**	**Audi TDI 5.5 L Turbo V12 (Diesel)**	M	**145**
2	LMP1	1	(United States) Audi Sport North America	(Italy) Emanuele Pirro (Netherlands) Christijan Albers	Audi R10 TDI	M	145
2	LMP1	1	(United States) Audi Sport North America	(Italy) Emanuele Pirro (Netherlands) Christijan Albers	Audi TDI 5.5 L Turbo V12 (Diesel)	M	145
3	**LMP2**	**26**	**(United States) Andretti Green Racing**	**(France) Franck Montagny (Brazil) Tony Kanaan**	**Acura ARX-01B**	M	**145**
3	**LMP2**	**26**	**(United States) Andretti Green Racing**	**(France) Franck Montagny (Brazil) Tony Kanaan**	**Acura AL7R 3.4 L V8**	M	**145**
4	LMP2	66	(United States) de Ferran Motorsports	(Brazil) Gil de Ferran (France) Simon Pagenaud	Acura ARX-01B	M	145
4	LMP2	66	(United States) de Ferran Motorsports	(Brazil) Gil de Ferran (France) Simon Pagenaud	Acura AL7R 3.4 L V8	M	145
5	LMP2	7	(United States) Penske Racing	(Germany) Timo Bernhard (France) Romain Dumas	Porsche RS Spyder Evo	M	145
5	LMP2	7	(United States) Penske Racing	(Germany) Timo Bernhard (France) Romain Dumas	Porsche MR6 3.4 L V8	M	145
6	LMP2	5	(United States) Penske Motorsports, Inc.	(Brazil) Hélio Castroneves (Australia) Ryan Briscoe	Porsche RS Spyder Evo	M	145
6	LMP2	5	(United States) Penske Motorsports, Inc.	(Brazil) Hélio Castroneves (Australia) Ryan Briscoe	Porsche MR6 3.4 L V8	M	145
7	LMP2	16	(United States) Dyson Racing	(United States) Chris Dyson (United Kingdom) Guy Smith	Porsche RS Spyder Evo	M	145
7	LMP2	16	(United States) Dyson Racing	(United States) Chris Dyson (United Kingdom) Guy Smith	Porsche MR6 3.4 L V8	M	145
8	LMP2	20	(United States) Dyson Racing	(United States) Butch Leitzinger (United Kingdom) Marino Franchitti	Porsche RS Spyder Evo	M	144
8	LMP2	20	(United States) Dyson Racing	(United States) Butch Leitzinger (United Kingdom) Marino Franchitti	Porsche MR6 3.4 L V8	M	144
9	LMP2	15	(Mexico) Lowe's Fernández Racing	(Mexico) Adrian Fernández (Mexico) Luis Díaz	Acura ARX-01B	M	144
9	LMP2	15	(Mexico) Lowe's Fernández Racing	(Mexico) Adrian Fernández (Mexico) Luis Díaz	Acura AL7R 3.4 L V8	M	144
10	LMP2	6	(United States) Penske Racing	(United States) Patrick Long (Germany) Sascha Maassen	Porsche RS Spyder Evo	M	144
10	LMP2	6	(United States) Penske Racing	(United States) Patrick Long (Germany) Sascha Maassen	Porsche MR6 3.4 L V8	M	144
11	LMP1	48	(United States) Corsa Motorsports	(United States) Gunnar Jeannette (United Kingdom) Johnny Mowlem (Sweden) Stefan Johansson	Ginetta-Zytek 07S	D	142
11	LMP1	48	(United States) Corsa Motorsports	(United States) Gunnar Jeannette (United Kingdom) Johnny Mowlem (Sweden) Stefan Johansson	Zytek 4.5 L V8	D	142
12	**GT1**	**4**	**(United States) Corvette Racing**	**(United Kingdom) Oliver Gavin (Monaco) Olivier Beretta**	**Chevrolet Corvette C6.R**	M	**139**
12	**GT1**	**4**	**(United States) Corvette Racing**	**(United Kingdom) Oliver Gavin (Monaco) Olivier Beretta**	**Chevrolet LS7-R 7.0 L V8 (E85 ethanol)**	M	**139**
13	GT1	3	(United States) Corvette Racing	(United States) Johnny O'Connell (Denmark) Jan Magnussen	Chevrolet Corvette C6.R	M	139
13	GT1	3	(United States) Corvette Racing	(United States) Johnny O'Connell (Denmark) Jan Magnussen	Chevrolet LS7-R 7.0 L V8 (E85 ethanol)	M	139
14	**GT2**	**71**	**(United States) Tafel Racing**	**(Germany) Dominik Farnbacher (Germany) Dirk Müller**	**Ferrari F430GT**	M	**139**
14	**GT2**	**71**	**(United States) Tafel Racing**	**(Germany) Dominik Farnbacher (Germany) Dirk Müller**	**Ferrari 4.0 L V8**	M	**139**
15	LMP2	9	(United States) Patrón Highcroft Racing	(United States) Scott Sharp (Australia) David Brabham	Acura ARX-01B	M	139
15	LMP2	9	(United States) Patrón Highcroft Racing	(United States) Scott Sharp (Australia) David Brabham	Acura AL7R 3.4 L V8	M	139
16	GT2	62	(United States) Risi Competizione	(Brazil) Jaime Melo (Finland) Mika Salo	Ferrari F430GT	M	139
16	GT2	62	(United States) Risi Competizione	(Brazil) Jaime Melo (Finland) Mika Salo	Ferrari 4.0 L V8	M	139
17	GT2	87	(United States) Farnbacher-Loles Motorsports	(Germany) Dirk Werner (United States) Bryce Miller	Porsche 997 GT3-RSR	M	138
17	GT2	87	(United States) Farnbacher-Loles Motorsports	(Germany) Dirk Werner (United States) Bryce Miller	Porsche 4.0 L Flat-6	M	138
18	LMP1	88	(United Kingdom) Creation Autosportif	(United Kingdom) Jamie Campbell-Walter (South Africa) Stephen Simpson (United States) Liz Halliday	Creation CA07	D	138
18	LMP1	88	(United Kingdom) Creation Autosportif	(United Kingdom) Jamie Campbell-Walter (South Africa) Stephen Simpson (United States) Liz Halliday	AIM (Judd) YS5.5 5.5 L V10 (E85 ethanol)	D	138
19	GT2	21	(United States) Panoz Team PTG	(United States) Tommy Milner (United States) Joey Hand	Panoz Esperante GT-LM	Y	137
19	GT2	21	(United States) Panoz Team PTG	(United States) Tommy Milner (United States) Joey Hand	Ford (Élan) 5.0 L V8	Y	137
20	GT2	46	(United States) Flying Lizard Motorsports	(United States) Johannes van Overbeek (France) Patrick Pilet	Porsche 997 GT3-RSR	M	137
20	GT2	46	(United States) Flying Lizard Motorsports	(United States) Johannes van Overbeek (France) Patrick Pilet	Porsche 4.0 L Flat-6	M	137
21	GT2	44	(United States) Flying Lizard Motorsports	(United States) Darren Law (United States) Seth Neiman (United States) Lonnie Pechnik	Porsche 997 GT3-RSR	M	135
21	GT2	44	(United States) Flying Lizard Motorsports	(United States) Darren Law (United States) Seth Neiman (United States) Lonnie Pechnik	Porsche 4.0 L Flat-6	M	135
22	GT2	99	(Monaco) JMB Racing (United Kingdom) Aucott Racing	(United Kingdom) Ben Aucott (Germany) Pierre Kaffer	Ferrari F430GT	D	134
22	GT2	99	(Monaco) JMB Racing (United Kingdom) Aucott Racing	(United Kingdom) Ben Aucott (Germany) Pierre Kaffer	Ferrari 4.0 L V8	D	134
23	GT2	007	(United Kingdom) Drayson-Barwell	(United Kingdom) Paul Drayson (United Kingdom) Jonny Cocker	Aston Martin V8 Vantage GT2	D	134
23	GT2	007	(United Kingdom) Drayson-Barwell	(United Kingdom) Paul Drayson (United Kingdom) Jonny Cocker	Aston Martin 4.5 L V8 (E85 ethanol)	D	134
24	GT2	54	(United States) Black Swan Racing	(United States) Tim Pappas (United States) Anthony Lazzaro (United States) Andy Pilgrim	Ford GT-R Mk.VII	F	133
24	GT2	54	(United States) Black Swan Racing	(United States) Tim Pappas (United States) Anthony Lazzaro (United States) Andy Pilgrim	Ford 5.0 L V8	F	133
25	GT2	45	(United States) Flying Lizard Motorsports	(Germany) Jörg Bergmeister (Germany) Wolf Henzler	Porsche 997 GT3-RSR	M	133
25	GT2	45	(United States) Flying Lizard Motorsports	(Germany) Jörg Bergmeister (Germany) Wolf Henzler	Porsche 4.0 L Flat-6	M	133
26	GT2	73	(United States) Tafel Racing	(United States) Harrison Brix (United States) Alex Figge (Germany) Pierre Ehret	Ferrari F430GT	M	132
26	GT2	73	(United States) Tafel Racing	(United States) Harrison Brix (United States) Alex Figge (Germany) Pierre Ehret	Ferrari 4.0 L V8	M	132
27	GT2	61	(United States) Risi Competizione (United States) Krohn Racing	(United States) Tracy Krohn (Sweden) Niclas Jönsson	Ferrari F430GT	M	129
27	GT2	61	(United States) Risi Competizione (United States) Krohn Racing	(United States) Tracy Krohn (Sweden) Niclas Jönsson	Ferrari 4.0 L V8	M	129
28	GT2	40	(United States) Robertson Racing	(United States) David Robertson (United States) Andrea Robertson (United States) David Murry	Ford GT-R Mk.VII	D	129
28	GT2	40	(United States) Robertson Racing	(United States) David Robertson (United States) Andrea Robertson (United States) David Murry	Ford 5.0 L V8	D	129
29	GT2	11	(United States) Primetime Race Group	(United States) Joel Feinberg (United Kingdom) Chris Hall	Dodge Viper Competition Coupe	H	112
29	GT2	11	(United States) Primetime Race Group	(United States) Joel Feinberg (United Kingdom) Chris Hall	Dodge 8.3 L V10	H	112
30	LMP2	8	(United States) B-K Motorsports	(United States) Gerardo Bonilla (United Kingdom) Ben Devlin (Brazil) Raphael Matos	Lola B08/86	D	106
30	LMP2	8	(United States) B-K Motorsports	(United States) Gerardo Bonilla (United Kingdom) Ben Devlin (Brazil) Raphael Matos	Mazda MZR-R 2.0 L Turbo I4 (E85 ethanol)	D	106
31 DNF	LMP1	37	(United States) Intersport Racing	(United States) Jon Field (United Kingdom) Ryan Lewis (United States) Richard Berry	Lola B06/10	D	102
31 DNF	LMP1	37	(United States) Intersport Racing	(United States) Jon Field (United Kingdom) Ryan Lewis (United States) Richard Berry	AER P32C 4.0 L Turbo V8 (E85 ethanol)	D	102
32 NC	LMP1	12	(United States) Autocon Motorsports	(United States) Chris McMurry (Canada) Tony Burgess	Lola B06/10	D	87
32 NC	LMP1	12	(United States) Autocon Motorsports	(United States) Chris McMurry (Canada) Tony Burgess	AER P32C 4.0 L Turbo V8	D	87
33 DNF	LMP1	10	(United Kingdom) ECO Racing	(United States) Andrew Prendeville (Japan) Hideki Noda	Radical SR10	D	46
33 DNF	LMP1	10	(United Kingdom) ECO Racing	(United States) Andrew Prendeville (Japan) Hideki Noda	ECO (AER) 5.0 L Turbo V10 (Diesel)	D	46
34 DNF	GT2	18	(Germany) VICI Racing	(Netherlands) Nicky Pastorelli (Netherlands) Francesco Pastorelli (Germany) Marc Basseng	Porsche 997 GT3-RSR	K	17
34 DNF	GT2	18	(Germany) VICI Racing	(Netherlands) Nicky Pastorelli (Netherlands) Francesco Pastorelli (Germany) Marc Basseng	Porsche 4.0 L Flat-6	K	17

American Le Mans Series
Previous race: 2008 Petit Le Mans	2008 season	Next race: None
