= 2007 Petit Le Mans =

Sportscar endurance race in Georgia, US

The Track map of Road Atlanta

The 2007 Petit Le Mans was the eleventh round of the 2007 American Le Mans Series season and tenth running of the Petit Le Mans. It took place at Road Atlanta, Georgia on October 6, 2007. This race also marked the closest finish in Petit Le Mans history, with the top two finishers being separated by 0.923 seconds after the 1,000-mile (1,600 km) race.

Audi driver Emanuele Pirro was initially going to drive the No. 2 entry, but suffered a concussion due to an accident in practice a few days earlier. Due to his inability to drive, Audi factory driver Lucas Luhr moved from the Petersen/White Lightning entry to take the seat in the Audi R10 TDI.

== Unofficial results ==
Class winners in bold. Cars failing to complete 75% of winner's distance marked as Not Classified (NC).

Pos	Class	No	Team	Drivers	Chassis	Tyre	Laps
Pos	Class	No	Team	Drivers	Engine	Tyre	Laps
1	**LMP1**	**1**	**(United States) Audi Sport North America**	**(Italy) Rinaldo Capello (United Kingdom) Allan McNish**	**Audi R10 TDI**	M	**394**
1	**LMP1**	**1**	**(United States) Audi Sport North America**	**(Italy) Rinaldo Capello (United Kingdom) Allan McNish**	**Audi TDI 5.5L Turbo V12 (Diesel)**	M	**394**
2	**LMP2**	**7**	**(United States) Penske Racing**	**(France) Romain Dumas (Germany) Timo Bernhard (United States) Patrick Long**	**Porsche RS Spyder Evo**	M	**394**
2	**LMP2**	**7**	**(United States) Penske Racing**	**(France) Romain Dumas (Germany) Timo Bernhard (United States) Patrick Long**	**Porsche MR6 3.4L V8**	M	**394**
3	LMP2	20	(United States) Dyson Racing	(United States) Chris Dyson (United Kingdom) Guy Smith	Porsche RS Spyder Evo	M	386
3	LMP2	20	(United States) Dyson Racing	(United States) Chris Dyson (United Kingdom) Guy Smith	Porsche MR6 3.4L V8	M	386
4	LMP2	5	(United Kingdom) Zytek Motorsports	(United Kingdom) Danny Watts (Germany) Stefan Mücke (Czech Republic) Jan Charouz	Zytek 07S/2	M	383
4	LMP2	5	(United Kingdom) Zytek Motorsports	(United Kingdom) Danny Watts (Germany) Stefan Mücke (Czech Republic) Jan Charouz	Zytek ZG348 3.4L V8	M	383
5	LMP1	88	(United Kingdom) Creation Autosportif	(United Kingdom) Jamie Campbell-Walter (France) Christophe Tinseau (Switzerland) Harold Primat	Creation CA07	D	377
5	LMP1	88	(United Kingdom) Creation Autosportif	(United Kingdom) Jamie Campbell-Walter (France) Christophe Tinseau (Switzerland) Harold Primat	Judd GV5.5 S2 5.5L V10	D	377
6	LMP2	16	(United States) Dyson Racing	(United States) Butch Leitzinger (United Kingdom) Andy Wallace (United States) Andy Lally	Porsche RS Spyder Evo	M	372
6	LMP2	16	(United States) Dyson Racing	(United States) Butch Leitzinger (United Kingdom) Andy Wallace (United States) Andy Lally	Porsche MR6 3.4L V8	M	372
7	LMP2	6	(United States) Penske Racing	(Germany) Sascha Maassen (Australia) Ryan Briscoe (France) Emmanuel Collard	Porsche RS Spyder Evo	M	370
7	LMP2	6	(United States) Penske Racing	(Germany) Sascha Maassen (Australia) Ryan Briscoe (France) Emmanuel Collard	Porsche MR6 3.4L V8	M	370
8	LMP2	9	(United States) Highcroft Racing	(Australia) David Brabham (Sweden) Stefan Johansson (United Kingdom) Robbie Kerr	Acura ARX-01a	M	365
8	LMP2	9	(United States) Highcroft Racing	(Australia) David Brabham (Sweden) Stefan Johansson (United Kingdom) Robbie Kerr	Acura AL7R 3.4L V8	M	365
9	**GT1**	**4**	**(United States) Corvette Racing**	**(United Kingdom) Oliver Gavin (Monaco) Olivier Beretta (Italy) Max Papis**	**Chevrolet Corvette C6.R**	M	**364**
9	**GT1**	**4**	**(United States) Corvette Racing**	**(United Kingdom) Oliver Gavin (Monaco) Olivier Beretta (Italy) Max Papis**	**Chevrolet LS7-R 7.0L V8**	M	**364**
10	**GT2**	**45**	**(United States) Flying Lizard Motorsports**	**(United States) Johannes van Overbeek (Germany) Jörg Bergmeister (Germany) Marc Lieb**	**Porsche 997 GT3-RSR**	M	**353**
10	**GT2**	**45**	**(United States) Flying Lizard Motorsports**	**(United States) Johannes van Overbeek (Germany) Jörg Bergmeister (Germany) Marc Lieb**	**Porsche 3.8L Flat-6**	M	**353**
11	GT2	71	(United States) Tafel Racing	(Germany) Wolf Henzler (Germany) Dominik Farnbacher	Porsche 997 GT3-RSR	M	351
11	GT2	71	(United States) Tafel Racing	(Germany) Wolf Henzler (Germany) Dominik Farnbacher	Porsche 3.8L Flat-6	M	351
12 DNF	LMP2	8	(United States) B-K Motorsports (Japan) Mazdaspeed	(United States) Jamie Bach (United Kingdom) Ben Devlin (Brazil) Raphael Matos	Lola B07/46	K	350
12 DNF	LMP2	8	(United States) B-K Motorsports (Japan) Mazdaspeed	(United States) Jamie Bach (United Kingdom) Ben Devlin (Brazil) Raphael Matos	Mazda MZR-R 2.0L Turbo I4	K	350
13	GT2	18	(United States) Rahal Letterman Racing	(United States) Tommy Milner (Germany) Ralf Kelleners (United States) Graham Rahal	Porsche 997 GT3-RSR	M	350
13	GT2	18	(United States) Rahal Letterman Racing	(United States) Tommy Milner (Germany) Ralf Kelleners (United States) Graham Rahal	Porsche 3.8L Flat-6	M	350
14	LMP1	06	(United States) Team Cytosport	(United States) Greg Pickett (Germany) Klaus Graf (Mexico) Memo Gidley	Lola B06/10	D	346
14	LMP1	06	(United States) Team Cytosport	(United States) Greg Pickett (Germany) Klaus Graf (Mexico) Memo Gidley	AER P32T 4.0L Turbo V8	D	346
15	GT2	54	(United States) Team Trans Sport Racing	(United States) Terry Borcheller (United States) Tim Pappas (Germany) Marc Basseng	Porsche 997 GT3-RSR	Y	342
15	GT2	54	(United States) Team Trans Sport Racing	(United States) Terry Borcheller (United States) Tim Pappas (Germany) Marc Basseng	Porsche 3.8L Flat-6	Y	342
16	GT2	44	(United States) Flying Lizard Motorsports	(United States) Darren Law (United States) Lonnie Pechnik (United States) Seth Neiman	Porsche 997 GT3-RSR	M	341
16	GT2	44	(United States) Flying Lizard Motorsports	(United States) Darren Law (United States) Lonnie Pechnik (United States) Seth Neiman	Porsche 3.8L Flat-6	M	341
17	LMP1	2	(United States) Audi Sport North America	(Germany) Lucas Luhr (Germany) Marco Werner	Audi R10 TDI	M	330
17	LMP1	2	(United States) Audi Sport North America	(Germany) Lucas Luhr (Germany) Marco Werner	Audi TDI 5.5L Turbo V12 (Diesel)	M	330
18	GT2	62	(United States) Risi Competizione	(Finland) Mika Salo (Brazil) Jaime Melo (United Kingdom) Johnny Mowlem	Ferrari F430GT	M	330
18	GT2	62	(United States) Risi Competizione	(Finland) Mika Salo (Brazil) Jaime Melo (United Kingdom) Johnny Mowlem	Ferrari 4.0L V8	M	330
19 DNF	GT1	27	(United States) Doran Racing	(Belgium) Didier Theys (Switzerland) Fredy Lienhard (Italy) Andrea Bertolini	Maserati MC12 GT1	M	314
19 DNF	GT1	27	(United States) Doran Racing	(Belgium) Didier Theys (Switzerland) Fredy Lienhard (Italy) Andrea Bertolini	Maserati 6.0L V12	M	314
20	LMP1	12	(United States) Autocon Motorsports	(United States) Chris McMurry (United States) Bryan Willman (United States) Michael Lewis	Creation CA06/H	D	304
20	LMP1	12	(United States) Autocon Motorsports	(United States) Chris McMurry (United States) Bryan Willman (United States) Michael Lewis	Judd GV5 5.0L V10	D	304
21	GT2	21	(United States) Panoz Team PTG	(United States) Bill Auberlen (United States) Joey Hand (United Kingdom) Tom Kimber-Smith	Panoz Esperante GT-LM	Y	302
21	GT2	21	(United States) Panoz Team PTG	(United States) Bill Auberlen (United States) Joey Hand (United Kingdom) Tom Kimber-Smith	Ford (Élan) 5.0L V8	Y	302
22 DNF	LMP1	10	(United Kingdom) Arena Motorsports International	(United Kingdom) Tom Chilton (United Kingdom) Darren Manning	Zytek 07S	M	288
22 DNF	LMP1	10	(United Kingdom) Arena Motorsports International	(United Kingdom) Tom Chilton (United Kingdom) Darren Manning	Zytek 2ZG408 4.0L V8	M	288
23 NC	GT2	61	(United States) Risi Competizione (United States) Krohn Racing	(United States) Tracy Krohn (Sweden) Niclas Jönsson (United Kingdom) Darren Turner	Ferrari F430GT	M	279
23 NC	GT2	61	(United States) Risi Competizione (United States) Krohn Racing	(United States) Tracy Krohn (Sweden) Niclas Jönsson (United Kingdom) Darren Turner	Ferrari 4.0L V8	M	279
24 DNF	GT2	31	(United States) Petersen Motorsports (United States) White Lightning Racing	(United Kingdom) Peter Dumbreck (Germany) Dirk Müller	Ferrari F430GT	M	123
24 DNF	GT2	31	(United States) Petersen Motorsports (United States) White Lightning Racing	(United Kingdom) Peter Dumbreck (Germany) Dirk Müller	Ferrari 4.0L V8	M	123
25 DNF	GT2	53	(United States) Robertson Racing	(United States) David Robertson (United States) Andrea Robertson (Netherlands) Arie Luyendyk Jr.	Panoz Esperante GT-LM	D	106
25 DNF	GT2	53	(United States) Robertson Racing	(United States) David Robertson (United States) Andrea Robertson (Netherlands) Arie Luyendyk Jr.	Ford (Élan) 5.0L V8	D	106
26 DNF	LMP2	15	(Mexico) Lowe's Fernández Racing	(Mexico) Adrian Fernández (Mexico) Luis Diaz	Lola B06/43	M	87
26 DNF	LMP2	15	(Mexico) Lowe's Fernández Racing	(Mexico) Adrian Fernández (Mexico) Luis Diaz	Acura AL7R 3.4L V8	M	87
27 DNF	LMP1	37	(United States) Intersport Racing	(United States) Jon Field (United States) Clint Field (United States) Richard Berry	Lola B06/10	D	60
27 DNF	LMP1	37	(United States) Intersport Racing	(United States) Jon Field (United States) Clint Field (United States) Richard Berry	AER P32T 4.0L Turbo V8	D	60
28 DNF	LMP2	26	(United States) Andretti Green Racing	(United States) Bryan Herta (Brazil) Vítor Meira (Brazil) Tony Kanaan	Acura ARX-01a	M	50
28 DNF	LMP2	26	(United States) Andretti Green Racing	(United States) Bryan Herta (Brazil) Vítor Meira (Brazil) Tony Kanaan	Acura AL7R 3.4L V8	M	50
29 DNF	GT2	73	(United States) Tafel Racing	(United States) Jim Tafel (United States) Nathan Swartzbaugh (Denmark) Lars-Erik Nielsen	Porsche 997 GT3-RSR	M	28
29 DNF	GT2	73	(United States) Tafel Racing	(United States) Jim Tafel (United States) Nathan Swartzbaugh (Denmark) Lars-Erik Nielsen	Porsche 3.8L Flat-6	M	28
30 DNF	GT1	3	(United States) Corvette Racing	(United States) Johnny O'Connell (Denmark) Jan Magnussen (Canada) Ron Fellows	Chevrolet Corvette C6.R	M	15
30 DNF	GT1	3	(United States) Corvette Racing	(United States) Johnny O'Connell (Denmark) Jan Magnussen (Canada) Ron Fellows	Chevrolet LS7-R 7.0L V8	M	15
DNQ	GT2	11	(United States) Primetime Race Group	(United States) Joel Feinberg (United States) Chapman Ducote	Dodge Viper Competition Coupe	M	-
DNQ	GT2	11	(United States) Primetime Race Group	(United States) Joel Feinberg (United States) Chapman Ducote	Dodge 8.3L V10	M	-

== Statistics ==
- Pole Position - No. 2 Audi Sport North America - 1:08.906

Note - #2 Audi did not start the race from the pole position due to a tire change, which placed it at the back of the field.

- Fastest Lap - No. 1 Audi Sport North America - 1:09.195

American Le Mans Series
Previous race: 2007 Detroit Sports Car Challenge	2007 season	Next race: 2007 Monterey Sports Car Championships
