= Nasamax DM139 =

Le Mans Prototype race car

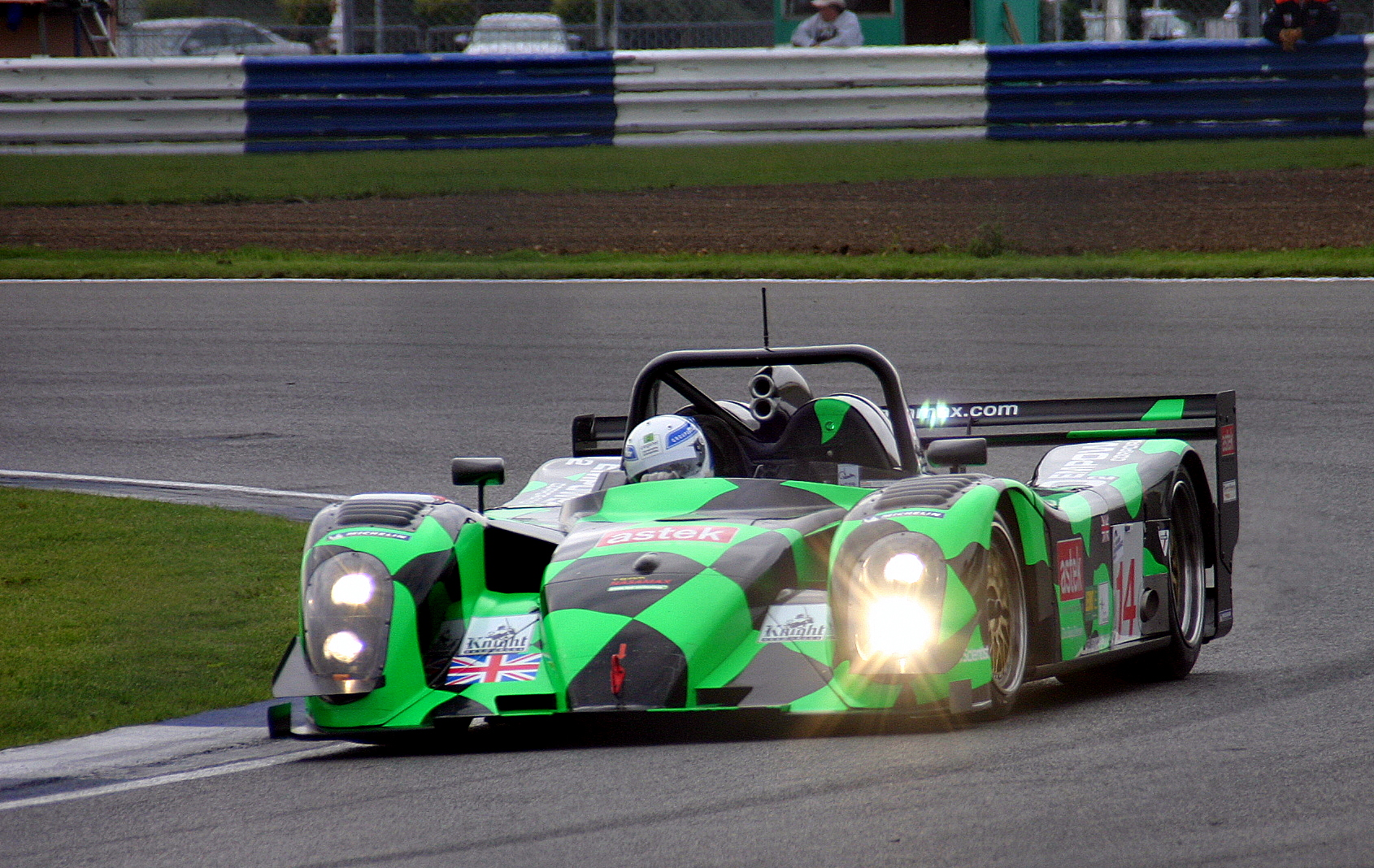
- Category: Le Mans Prototype
- Constructor: KW Motorsport
- Designer: Kireon Salter
- Production: 2004

Technical specifications
- Chassis: Carbon fiber and aluminum honeycomb monocoque
- Suspension (front): Fabricated steel double wishbones, pushrods with power steering and Koni suspensions
- Suspension (rear): Same as front
- Length: 4,382 mm (172.5 in)
- Width: 2,000 mm (79 in)
- Axle track: 1,625 mm (64.0 in) (front); 1,582 mm (62.3 in) (rear)
- Wheelbase: 2,740 mm (108 in)
- Engine: Judd GV5 4,997 cc (5.0 L; 304.9 cu in) 72° V10 N/A, 40-valve, DOHC mid-mounted
- Transmission: Ricardo 6-speed sequential
- Power: 600 hp (608 PS; 447 kW)
- Weight: 917 kg (2,021.6 lb)
- Fuel: Bio-ethanol
- Brakes: AP Racing front and rear Front: 380 mm (15 in) carbon discs Rear: 380 mm (15 in) carbon discs
- Tyres: Dunlop; Michelin

Competition history
- Notable entrants: (United Kingdom) Team Nasamax
- Notable drivers: (Canada) Robbie Stirling (South Africa) Werner Lupberger (France) Romain Dumas (United Kingdom) Kevin McGarrity
- Debut: 2004 1000 km of Monza
- Last event: 2004 1000 km of Spa
| Races | Wins | Podiums | Poles | F/Laps |
|---|---|---|---|---|
| 4 | 0 | 0 | 0 | 0 |
- Teams' Championships: 0
- Constructors' Championships: 0
- Drivers' Championships: 0

The Nasamax DM139 is a Le Mans Prototype (LMP) racing car built by KW Motorsport. It was modified from a Reynard 2KQ-LM chassis and converted to 2004 Automobile Club de l'Ouest (ACO) LMP1 specifications.

The name is a reference to one of the public roads (D139) that forms part of the Circuit de la Sarthe. The car is famous for being the first alternative fueled prototype car to finish the 24 Hours of Le Mans and was featured in an issue of the British science magazine, New Scientist. This car also has the distinct honor of being the first homologated car for the ruleset, giving it the number: "ACO LMP1 001".

== Developmental history ==
The car started life as a Reynard 2KQ-LM chassis and was heavily modified to conform to the 2004 LMP1 regulations. Team Nasamax replaced the previous, unreliable, CART Cosworth XDE V8 with the 5.0 L V10, Judd GV5. The engine was developed with input from Judd and Nasamax. The new regulations on rear wings limited the aerodynamic efficiency of the car with the designer, Kireon Salter, suggesting that "the overall downforce was down by as much as 25%". Several rear wings were used in an attempt to generate more rear downforce as they did not have a wind tunnel model to test designs.

== Racing history ==
The racing career of this chassis was brief, with just one full year of competition in the 2004 Le Mans Endurance Series. In its debut race at Monza, Robbie Stirling and Werner Lupberger qualified ninth and had the fastest straight-line speed during the session, reaching 318 km/h (198 mph). They finished eighth in LMP1 and overall, 15 laps down.

For the next race at the 24 Hours of Le Mans, Stirling and Lupberger were joined by Kevin McGarrity. Due to its usage of biofuel, the ACO allowed the team to increase the car's fuel tank capacity to 120 liters. Team Nasamax qualified 14th with a time of 3:42.429. During the race, the car had an engine misfire. Despite this they finished 17th overall and seventh overall and became the first prototype to finish the 24 Hours of Le Mans, while powered by an alternative fuel.

After skipping the second round at the Nürburgring, the next race for the car would be at Silverstone. Romain Dumas would make his race debut, replacing McGarrity, in the car after initially testing it at Paul Ricard for the LMES Official Test. The trio would qualify in tenth. In the race, the car would suffer no reliability issues and would finish in its career best position of fifth.

At the final round of the season at Spa-Francorchamps, an accident in the warmp-up session required the right front corner to be replaced but no mechanical damage was found. The car qualified ninth with a time of 2:09.942. During the race, just after three hours of running, the car suffered an accident at Speaker's Corner, that resulted in a retirement. This was the last race of its career.

Team Nasamax attempted to enter the 2005 24 Hours of Le Mans but withdrew due to financial issues.
