= 2008 Petit Le Mans =

Sportscar endurance race in Georgia, US

The Track map of Road Atlanta

The 2008 Petit Le Mans powered by the Totally New Mazda6 was the eleventh running of the Petit Le Mans and the tenth round of the 2008 American Le Mans Series season. It took place at Road Atlanta in Braselton, Georgia, United States of America on October 4, 2008. This race marked the first time that the American Le Mans Series awarded victors in their Green Challenge, in preparation for a full championship in the 2009 season.

== Report ==
=== Qualifying ===
On Friday afternoon before Saturday's race, qualifying was held in two 25-minute sessions. The two GT categories ran first, led by the lone GT1 entries of Corvette Racing. Halfway through the session, it was Johnny O'Connell's #3 Corvette which achieved the fastest time before the squad ended the session early. In GT2, much of the battle was between the various Porsche and Ferrari teams. The Porsche of Farnbacher-Loles and the Ferrari of European entrant JMB Racing led early, but Jaime Melo in the Risi Competizione was able to give Ferrari the pole position by a margin of 0.057 seconds. Marc Goossens' LG Motorsports Chevrolet Corvette was the fastest qualifier not in a Ferrari or Porsche, completing the session in seventh.

After a short break, the two Le Mans Prototype classes began their qualification session. After six minutes, Allan McNish in the Audi R10 TDI claimed overall pole position. Although Peugeot closed the gap on the Audi, McNish eventually returned to the pits to end his session. As McNish exited the car, Stéphane Sarrazin was able to better the Audi's time by 0.085 seconds and claim overall pole position for the race. In the LMP2 category, returning Penske Porsche driver Ryan Briscoe led the class early. He was eventually joined by his two Penske teammates, giving the team a lock on the top three qualifying positions in the class. Andretti Green Racing's Acura followed the Porsche trio.

Previous qualifying records for all four classes were broken in these two sessions. The top six overall qualifiers, the Peugeot, two Audis, and three Penske Porsches were also able to break an absolute track qualifying record initially set by Davy Jones in a Jaguar XJR-9 in 1992. Sarrazin's Peugeot bettered the Jaguar's record lap by approximately 2.5 mph (4.0 km/h) in average speed.

==== Qualifying result ====
Pole position winners in each class are marked in bold.

Pos	Class	Team	Qualifying Driver	Time
1	**LMP1**	**#07 (France) Peugeot Sport Total**	**(France) Stéphane Sarrazin**	**1:06.242**
2	LMP1	#1 (United States) Audi Sport North America	(United Kingdom) Allan McNish	1:06.327
3	LMP1	#2 (United States) Audi Sport North America	(Germany) Marco Werner	1:06.818
4	**LMP2**	**#5 (United States) Penske Motorsports, Inc.**	**(Australia) Ryan Briscoe**	**1:07.061**
5	LMP2	#7 (United States) Penske Racing	(France) Romain Dumas	1:07.149
6	LMP2	#6 (United States) Penske Racing	(Germany) Sascha Maassen	1:07.401
7	LMP2	#26 (United States) Andretti Green Racing	(France) Franck Montagny	1:07.486
8	LMP2	#66 (United States) de Ferran Motorsports	(France) Simon Pagenaud	1:07.656
9	LMP1	#50 (United Kingdom) Team LNT	(France) Olivier Pla	1:07.656
10	LMP1	#37 (United States) Intersport Racing	(United States) Jon Field	1:07.784
11	LMP2	#15 (Mexico) Lowe's Fernández Racing	(Mexico) Adrian Fernández	1:07.866
12	LMP2	#9 (United States) Patrón Highcroft Racing	(Australia) David Brabham	1:08.064
13	LMP2	#16 (United States) Dyson Racing	(United Kingdom) Guy Smith	1:08.175
14	LMP2	#20 (United States) Dyson Racing	(United Kingdom) Marino Franchitti	1:08.446
15	LMP2	#8 (United States) B-K Motorsports	(United Kingdom) Ben Devlin	1:08.896
16	LMP1	#88 (United Kingdom) Creation Autosportif	(Switzerland) Harold Primat	1:09.402
17	LMP1	#48 (United States) Corsa Motorsports	(Sweden) Stefan Johansson	1:09.504
18	LMP1	#30 (United States) Intersport Racing	(United Kingdom) Ryan Lewis	1:09.785
19	LMP1	#888 (United Kingdom) Creation Autosportif	(United Kingdom) Stuart Hall	1:09.944
20	**GT1**	**#3 (United States) Corvette Racing**	**(United States) Johnny O'Connell**	**1:16.542**
21	GT1	#4 (United States) Corvette Racing	(Monaco) Olivier Beretta	1:16.589
22	**GT2**	**#62 (United States) Risi Competizione**	**(Brazil) Jaime Melo**	**1:19.399**
23	GT2	#87 (United States) Farnbacher-Loles Motorsports	(Germany) Dirk Werner	1:19.456
24	GT2	#71 (United States) Tafel Racing	(Germany) Dirk Müller	1:19.795
25	GT2	#45 (United States) Flying Lizard Motorsports	(Germany) Jörg Bergmeister	1:19.885
26	GT2	#99 (Monaco) JMB Racing	(Germany) Pierre Kaffer	1:20.206
27	GT2	#61 (United States) Risi Competizione	(Sweden) Niclas Jönsson	1:20.667
28	GT2	#28 (United States) LG Motorsports	(Belgium) Marc Goossens	1:20.743
29	GT2	#007 (United Kingdom) Drayson-Barwell	(United Kingdom) Darren Turner	1:20.940
30	GT2	#21 (United States) Panoz Team PTG	(United States) Tom Milner Jr.	1:21.419
31	GT2	#40 (United States) Robertson Racing	(United States) David Murry	1:21.438
32	GT2	#54 (United States) Black Swan Racing	(United States) Anthony Lazzaro	1:21.616
33	GT2	#18 (Germany) VICI Racing	(Germany) Marc Basseng	1:21.876
34	GT2	#11 (United States) Primetime Race Group	(United Kingdom) Chris Hall	1:22.302
35	GT2	#44 (United States) Flying Lizard Motorsports	(United States) Seth Neiman	1:23.589
36	GT2	#73 (United States) Tafel Racing	(United States) Alex Figge	1:23.096^{†}
37	LMP1	#12 (United States) Autocon Motorsports	Did not participate	No time
38	GT2	#46 (United States) Flying Lizard Motorsports	Did not participate	No time

† - The #73 Tafel Racing was penalized due to a rule infraction during a pit stop in qualifying. The car was therefore moved to the back of the starting grid.

=== Race ===
Just twenty minutes short of the ten-hour limit, the #1 Audi of Allan McNish completed the 1,000-mile (1,600 km) endurance just 4.5 seconds ahead of the #07 Peugeot of Christian Klien. The second Audi finished the overall podium, also on the lead lap. In LMP2, rookie Petit Le Mans entrant Hélio Castroneves led the trio of Penske Porsches past the checkered flag, locking out the podium. Porsches finished in five of the top six positions in the LMP2 class, joined only by the de Ferran Acura in fifth.

After earlier mechanical problems with the #4 Corvette, its #3 teammate led to victory in the GT1 class unchallenged. The GT2 class was won by a Ferrari for the first time in the event's history, the #62 car of Risi Competizione leading the marque. It was followed by several seconds by the championship-leading Flying Lizard Porsche.

In the first ever Green Challenge, Penske Racing and Corvette Racing won in their respective categories. The #6 car was the most efficient of the LMP cars, while the already victorious #3 Corvette was also the most efficient amongst GTs.

==== Race result ====
Class winners in bold. Cars failing to complete 70% of winner's distance marked as Not classified (NC).

Pos	Class	No	Team	Drivers	Chassis	Tyre	Laps
Pos	Class	No	Team	Drivers	Engine	Tyre	Laps
1	**LMP1**	**1**	**(United States) Audi Sport North America**	**(Italy) Emanuele Pirro (Italy) Rinaldo Capello (United Kingdom) Allan McNish**	**Audi R10 TDI**	M	**394**
1	**LMP1**	**1**	**(United States) Audi Sport North America**	**(Italy) Emanuele Pirro (Italy) Rinaldo Capello (United Kingdom) Allan McNish**	**Audi TDI 5.5 L Turbo V12 (Diesel)**	M	**394**
2	LMP1	07	(France) Peugeot Sport Total	(France) Nicolas Minassian (France) Stéphane Sarrazin (Austria) Christian Klien	Peugeot 908 HDi FAP	M	394
2	LMP1	07	(France) Peugeot Sport Total	(France) Nicolas Minassian (France) Stéphane Sarrazin (Austria) Christian Klien	Peugeot HDi 5.5 L V12 (Diesel)	M	394
3	LMP1	2	(United States) Audi Sport North America	(Germany) Marco Werner (Germany) Lucas Luhr	Audi R10 TDI	M	394
3	LMP1	2	(United States) Audi Sport North America	(Germany) Marco Werner (Germany) Lucas Luhr	Audi TDI 5.5 L Turbo V12 (Diesel)	M	394
4	**LMP2**	**5**	**(United States) Penske Motorsports, Inc.**	**(Brazil) Hélio Castroneves (Australia) Ryan Briscoe**	**Porsche RS Spyder Evo**	M	**394**
4	**LMP2**	**5**	**(United States) Penske Motorsports, Inc.**	**(Brazil) Hélio Castroneves (Australia) Ryan Briscoe**	**Porsche MR6 3.4 L V8**	M	**394**
5	LMP2	7	(United States) Penske Racing	(Germany) Timo Bernhard (France) Romain Dumas	Porsche RS Spyder Evo	M	394
5	LMP2	7	(United States) Penske Racing	(Germany) Timo Bernhard (France) Romain Dumas	Porsche MR6 3.4 L V8	M	394
6	LMP2	6	(United States) Penske Racing	(United States) Patrick Long (Germany) Sascha Maassen (France) Emmanuel Collard	Porsche RS Spyder Evo	M	392
6	LMP2	6	(United States) Penske Racing	(United States) Patrick Long (Germany) Sascha Maassen (France) Emmanuel Collard	Porsche MR6 3.4 L V8	M	392
7	LMP2	20	(United States) Dyson Racing	(United States) Butch Leitzinger (United Kingdom) Marino Franchitti (United States) Andy Lally	Porsche RS Spyder Evo	M	391
7	LMP2	20	(United States) Dyson Racing	(United States) Butch Leitzinger (United Kingdom) Marino Franchitti (United States) Andy Lally	Porsche MR6 3.4 L V8	M	391
8	LMP2	66	(United States) de Ferran Motorsports	(Brazil) Gil de Ferran (France) Simon Pagenaud (New Zealand) Scott Dixon	Acura ARX-01B	M	388
8	LMP2	66	(United States) de Ferran Motorsports	(Brazil) Gil de Ferran (France) Simon Pagenaud (New Zealand) Scott Dixon	Acura AL7R 3.4 L V8	M	388
9	LMP2	16	(United States) Dyson Racing	(United States) Chris Dyson (United Kingdom) Guy Smith	Porsche RS Spyder Evo	M	384
9	LMP2	16	(United States) Dyson Racing	(United States) Chris Dyson (United Kingdom) Guy Smith	Porsche MR6 3.4 L V8	M	384
10	**GT1**	**3**	**(United States) Corvette Racing**	**(United States) Johnny O'Connell (Denmark) Jan Magnussen (Canada) Ron Fellows**	**Chevrolet Corvette C6.R**	M	**365**
10	**GT1**	**3**	**(United States) Corvette Racing**	**(United States) Johnny O'Connell (Denmark) Jan Magnussen (Canada) Ron Fellows**	**Chevrolet LS7-R 7.0 L V8 (E85 ethanol)**	M	**365**
11	GT1	4	(United States) Corvette Racing	(United Kingdom) Oliver Gavin (Monaco) Olivier Beretta (Italy) Max Papis	Chevrolet Corvette C6.R	M	359
11	GT1	4	(United States) Corvette Racing	(United Kingdom) Oliver Gavin (Monaco) Olivier Beretta (Italy) Max Papis	Chevrolet LS7-R 7.0 L V8 (E85 ethanol)	M	359
12	**GT2**	**62**	**(United States) Risi Competizione**	**(Brazil) Jaime Melo (Finland) Mika Salo**	**Ferrari F430GT**	M	**358**
12	**GT2**	**62**	**(United States) Risi Competizione**	**(Brazil) Jaime Melo (Finland) Mika Salo**	**Ferrari 4.0 L V8**	M	**358**
13	GT2	45	(United States) Flying Lizard Motorsports	(Germany) Jörg Bergmeister (Germany) Wolf Henzler (Germany) Marc Lieb	Porsche 997 GT3-RSR	M	358
13	GT2	45	(United States) Flying Lizard Motorsports	(Germany) Jörg Bergmeister (Germany) Wolf Henzler (Germany) Marc Lieb	Porsche 4.0 L Flat-6	M	358
14	LMP1	50	(United Kingdom) Team LNT (United States) Conquest Racing	(United Kingdom) Danny Watts (France) Olivier Pla	Ginetta-Zytek 07S	M	355
14	LMP1	50	(United Kingdom) Team LNT (United States) Conquest Racing	(United Kingdom) Danny Watts (France) Olivier Pla	Zytek 4.5 L V8	M	355
15	GT2	71	(United States) Tafel Racing	(Germany) Dominik Farnbacher (Germany) Dirk Müller	Ferrari F430GT	M	355
15	GT2	71	(United States) Tafel Racing	(Germany) Dominik Farnbacher (Germany) Dirk Müller	Ferrari 4.0 L V8	M	355
16 DNF	LMP2	26	(United States) Andretti Green Racing	(France) Franck Montagny (United States) Marco Andretti (Brazil) Tony Kanaan	Acura ARX-01B	M	347
16 DNF	LMP2	26	(United States) Andretti Green Racing	(France) Franck Montagny (United States) Marco Andretti (Brazil) Tony Kanaan	Acura AL7R 3.4 L V8	M	347
17	GT2	61	(United States) Risi Competizione (United States) Krohn Racing	(United States) Tracy Krohn (Belgium) Eric van de Poele (Sweden) Niclas Jönsson	Ferrari F430GT	M	346
17	GT2	61	(United States) Risi Competizione (United States) Krohn Racing	(United States) Tracy Krohn (Belgium) Eric van de Poele (Sweden) Niclas Jönsson	Ferrari 4.0 L V8	M	346
18	GT2	99	(Monaco) JMB Racing (United Kingdom) Aucott Racing	(United Kingdom) Ben Aucott (Germany) Pierre Kaffer (France) Stéphane Daoudi	Ferrari F430GT	D	344
18	GT2	99	(Monaco) JMB Racing (United Kingdom) Aucott Racing	(United Kingdom) Ben Aucott (Germany) Pierre Kaffer (France) Stéphane Daoudi	Ferrari 4.0 L V8	D	344
19	GT2	44	(United States) Flying Lizard Motorsports	(United States) Darren Law (United States) Seth Neiman (United States) Lonnie Pechnik	Porsche 997 GT3-RSR	M	339
19	GT2	44	(United States) Flying Lizard Motorsports	(United States) Darren Law (United States) Seth Neiman (United States) Lonnie Pechnik	Porsche 4.0 L Flat-6	M	339
20	GT2	73	(United States) Tafel Racing	(United States) Jim Tafel (United States) Alex Figge (Germany) Pierre Ehret	Ferrari F430GT	M	331
20	GT2	73	(United States) Tafel Racing	(United States) Jim Tafel (United States) Alex Figge (Germany) Pierre Ehret	Ferrari 4.0 L V8	M	331
21 DNF	GT2	46	(United States) Flying Lizard Motorsports	(United States) Johannes van Overbeek (France) Patrick Pilet	Porsche 997 GT3-RSR	M	311
21 DNF	GT2	46	(United States) Flying Lizard Motorsports	(United States) Johannes van Overbeek (France) Patrick Pilet	Porsche 4.0 L Flat-6	M	311
22 DNF	GT2	007	(United Kingdom) Drayson-Barwell	(United Kingdom) Paul Drayson (United Kingdom) Jonny Cocker (United Kingdom) Darren Turner	Aston Martin V8 Vantage GT2	D	294
22 DNF	GT2	007	(United Kingdom) Drayson-Barwell	(United Kingdom) Paul Drayson (United Kingdom) Jonny Cocker (United Kingdom) Darren Turner	Aston Martin 4.5 L V8 (E85 ethanol)	D	294
23 DNF	GT2	18	(Germany) VICI Racing	(Netherlands) Nicky Pastorelli (Netherlands) Francesco Pastorelli (Germany) Marc Basseng	Porsche 997 GT3-RSR	K	291
23 DNF	GT2	18	(Germany) VICI Racing	(Netherlands) Nicky Pastorelli (Netherlands) Francesco Pastorelli (Germany) Marc Basseng	Porsche 4.0 L Flat-6	K	291
24	GT2	54	(United States) Black Swan Racing	(United States) Tim Pappas (United States) Anthony Lazzaro (United States) Andy Pilgrim	Ford GT-R Mk.VII	F	291
24	GT2	54	(United States) Black Swan Racing	(United States) Tim Pappas (United States) Anthony Lazzaro (United States) Andy Pilgrim	Ford 5.0 L V8	F	291
25	GT2	21	(United States) Panoz Team PTG	(United States) Tom Milner Jr. (United States) Joey Hand (Germany) Andreas Wirth	Panoz Esperante GT-LM	Y	282
25	GT2	21	(United States) Panoz Team PTG	(United States) Tom Milner Jr. (United States) Joey Hand (Germany) Andreas Wirth	Ford (Élan) 5.0 L V8	Y	282
26 DNF	LMP2	15	(Mexico) Lowe's Fernández Racing	(Mexico) Adrian Fernández (Mexico) Luis Díaz (Mexico) Michel Jourdain Jr.	Acura ARX-01B	M	281
26 DNF	LMP2	15	(Mexico) Lowe's Fernández Racing	(Mexico) Adrian Fernández (Mexico) Luis Díaz (Mexico) Michel Jourdain Jr.	Acura AL7R 3.4 L V8	M	281
27 DNF	GT2	11	(United States) Primetime Race Group	(United States) Joel Feinberg (United Kingdom) Chris Hall	Dodge Viper Competition Coupe	H	280
27 DNF	GT2	11	(United States) Primetime Race Group	(United States) Joel Feinberg (United Kingdom) Chris Hall	Dodge 8.3 L V10	H	280
28 DNF	GT2	87	(United States) Farnbacher-Loles Motorsports	(Germany) Jörg Hardt (Germany) Dirk Werner (United States) Bryce Miller	Porsche 997 GT3-RSR	M	277
28 DNF	GT2	87	(United States) Farnbacher-Loles Motorsports	(Germany) Jörg Hardt (Germany) Dirk Werner (United States) Bryce Miller	Porsche 4.0 L Flat-6	M	277
29 DNF	GT2	40	(United States) Robertson Racing	(United States) David Robertson (United States) Andrea Robertson (United States) David Murry	Ford GT-R Mk.VII	D	263
29 DNF	GT2	40	(United States) Robertson Racing	(United States) David Robertson (United States) Andrea Robertson (United States) David Murry	Ford 5.0 L V8	D	263
30 DNF	LMP1	30	(United States) Intersport Racing	(United Kingdom) Ryan Lewis (United Kingdom) Luke Hines (France) Georges Forgeois	Lola B07/17	K	237
30 DNF	LMP1	30	(United States) Intersport Racing	(United Kingdom) Ryan Lewis (United Kingdom) Luke Hines (France) Georges Forgeois	Judd GV5.5 S2 5.5 L V10	K	237
31 DNF	LMP1	37	(United States) Intersport Racing	(United States) Jon Field (United States) Clint Field (United States) Richard Berry	Lola B06/10	D	160
31 DNF	LMP1	37	(United States) Intersport Racing	(United States) Jon Field (United States) Clint Field (United States) Richard Berry	AER P32C 4.0 L Turbo V8 (E85 ethanol)	D	160
32 DNF	LMP1	88	(United Kingdom) Creation Autosportif	(United Kingdom) Jamie Campbell-Walter (South Africa) Stephen Simpson (Switzerland) Harold Primat	Creation CA07	D	138
32 DNF	LMP1	88	(United Kingdom) Creation Autosportif	(United Kingdom) Jamie Campbell-Walter (South Africa) Stephen Simpson (Switzerland) Harold Primat	AIM (Judd) YS5.5 5.5 L V10 (E85 ethanol)	D	138
33 DNF	LMP1	12	(United States) Autocon Motorsports	(United States) Chris McMurry (United States) Bryan Willman (Canada) Tony Burgess	Lola B06/10	D	122
33 DNF	LMP1	12	(United States) Autocon Motorsports	(United States) Chris McMurry (United States) Bryan Willman (Canada) Tony Burgess	AER P32C 4.0 L Turbo V8	D	122
34 DNF	LMP1	888	(United Kingdom) Creation Autosportif	(United States) Liz Halliday (Canada) Dean Stirling (United Kingdom) Stuart Hall	Creation CA07	D	113
34 DNF	LMP1	888	(United Kingdom) Creation Autosportif	(United States) Liz Halliday (Canada) Dean Stirling (United Kingdom) Stuart Hall	AIM (Judd) YS5.5 5.5 L V10 (E85 ethanol)	D	113
35 DNF	LMP1	48	(United States) Corsa Motorsports	(United States) Gunnar Jeannette (United Kingdom) Johnny Mowlem (Sweden) Stefan Johansson	Zytek 07S	D	73
35 DNF	LMP1	48	(United States) Corsa Motorsports	(United States) Gunnar Jeannette (United Kingdom) Johnny Mowlem (Sweden) Stefan Johansson	Zytek 2ZG408 4.0 L V8	D	73
36 DNF	GT2	28	(United States) LG Motorsports	(United States) Lou Gigliotti (United States) Tomy Drissi (Belgium) Marc Goossens	Chevrolet Corvette C6	D	37
36 DNF	GT2	28	(United States) LG Motorsports	(United States) Lou Gigliotti (United States) Tomy Drissi (Belgium) Marc Goossens	Chevrolet LS3 6.0 L V8	D	37
37 DNF	LMP2	9	(United States) Patrón Highcroft Racing	(United States) Scott Sharp (Australia) David Brabham (United Kingdom) Dario Franchitti	Acura ARX-01B	M	16
37 DNF	LMP2	9	(United States) Patrón Highcroft Racing	(United States) Scott Sharp (Australia) David Brabham (United Kingdom) Dario Franchitti	Acura AL7R 3.4 L V8	M	16
DNS	LMP2	8	(United States) B-K Motorsports	(United States) Gerardo Bonilla (United Kingdom) Ben Devlin	Lola B08/86	D	-
DNS	LMP2	8	(United States) B-K Motorsports	(United States) Gerardo Bonilla (United Kingdom) Ben Devlin	Mazda MZR-R 2.0 L Turbo I4 (E85 ethanol)	D	-

American Le Mans Series
Previous race: 2008 Detroit Sports Car Challenge	2008 season	Next race: 2008 Monterey Sports Car Championships
