= KW Motorsport Ltd =

KW Motorsport Ltd have a wide range of engineering consultancy in Champ car and Le Mans series including the design of the Nasamax, Protan and Creation AutoSportif chassis that are based on Reynard Motorsports original products. The Company is based alongside its sister company KW Special Projects Ltd at Reynard Park, Brackley, England, where it is currently working on the adaptation and regeneration of MARCH Engineering’s iconic Le Mans prototype, the MARCH 75S.

== History ==
KW Motorsport Ltd was founded by Kieron Salter and Will Phillips in 2003 after the demise of Reynard Motor Sport, the company has had successful involvement in Le Mans, American Le Mans, European series, Super Touring car and single seat races.

=== Projects ===
LE Mans and Sports Cars

Creation DBA 2006 Hybrid Creation DBA – 03S Le Mans & LMES, Project Reynard 02S MP675 Le Mans and ALMS Project, Reynard 01Q LMP675 Le Mans and ALMS Project, Reynard 2KQ LMP900 Le Mans and Daytona Project, Chrysler Viper GTS Le Mans Project.

Nasamax DM139 LMP1 Le Mans & LMES

After the Nasamax team’s success at Le Mans in 2003 they instigated the design and creation of a bio-ethanol fuelled car using a revision of the Reynard 01Q chassis in order to comply with new LMP1/ 2 regulations. The main part of the redesign was completed by KW Motorsport who updated the chassis to incorporate the increased fuel capacity and driver protection.

Driven by Judd the car proved to be significantly faster and ultimately finished 17th overall and 7th in its class. It was the only car built to LMP1 specifications and took on old LMP 675 and 900 cars in its class.

== Indy Car ==
- CART HVM -2005
- CART Herdez Competition – Ryan Hunter- Reay -2004
- CART Roocketsports – Alex Tagliani 2003
- MARCH Engineering – MARCH Porsche Indy Car
- Pac West Racing Race Engineering

== Super Touring Cars ==
- Ford 1997-1998 Design, Manufacture and Development,
- Honda 1999 Championship win

== Sports 2000 ==
=== MARCH 09R ===
KW Motorsport was commissioned in 2009 to design and build a Sports 2000 Duratec based on the historic MARCH Engineering[7] 75S car. The style of the car is classic MARCH.

The 09R body concept was specifically intended to be a recreation of the historic and iconic MARCH 75S with a modern running gear, transmission and Ford Duratec engine.

Every race the car has performed in has resulted in a podium finish.
