= Creation Autosportif =

Sports car racing team

(United Kingdom) Creation Autosportif
- Founded: 2003
- Founder(s): Ian Bickerton; Mike Jankowski
- Folded: 2010
- Base: Oxford, England
- Former series: FIA GT Championship; FFSA GT Championship; American Le Mans Series; Le Mans Endurance Series
- Noted drivers: (France) Nicolas Minassian (United Kingdom) Jamie Campbell-Walter (United Kingdom) Allan McNish (Japan) Shinji Nakano (Finland) Mika Salo
- Website: creationsport.net

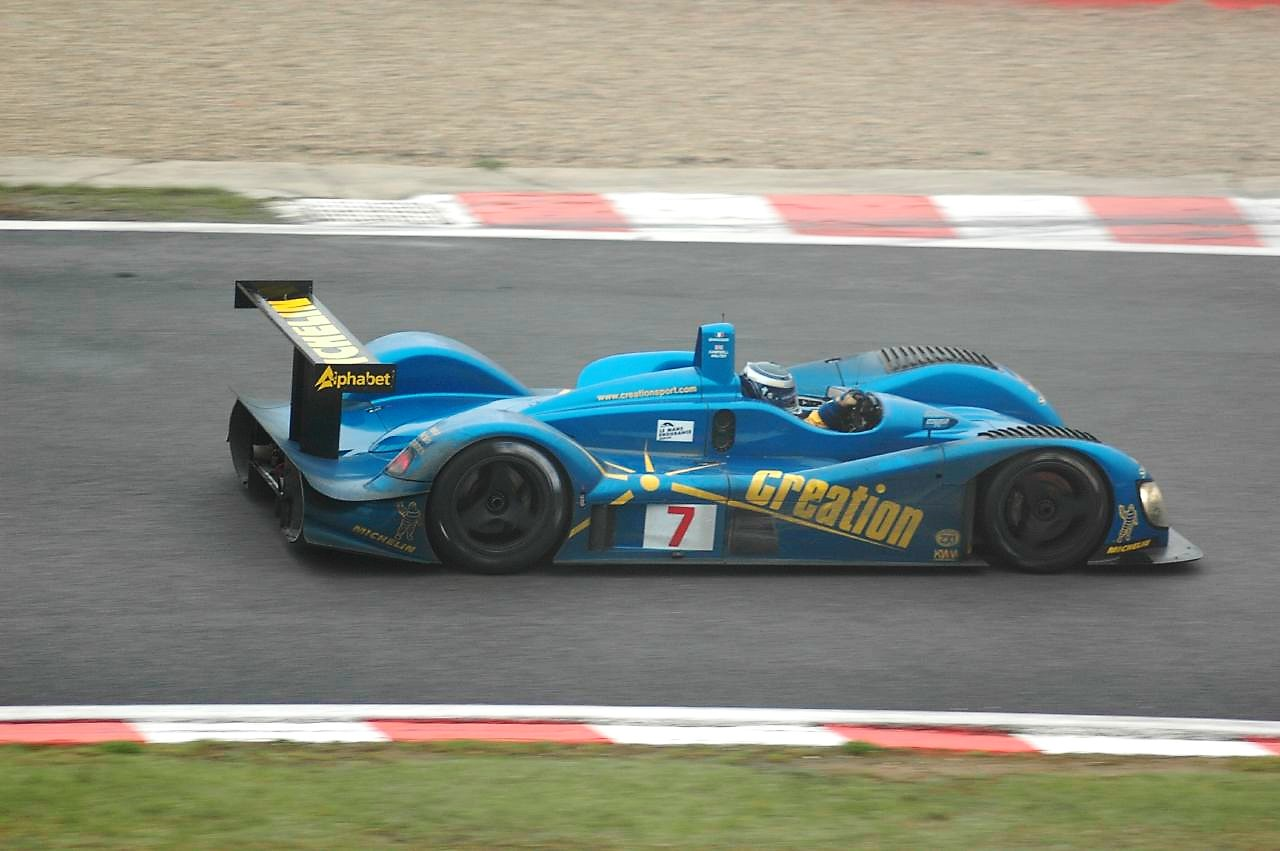
Creation's original DBA 03S at the 2005 1000km of Spa.

Creation Autosportif, Ltd. was a sports car racing team based in Oxford, England. It was founded in 2003 by Ian Bickerton and Mike Jankowski and has raced in the FIA GT Championship, FFSA GT Championship, American Le Mans Series, Le Mans Endurance Series, as well as the 24 Hours of Le Mans. Their cars are known for their blue and yellow paint schemes.

== Naming ==
Creation Autosportif gets its name from the Pillars of Creation, a formation in the Eagle Nebula. Company founder Mike Jankowski, as an astronomy fan and not wanting to create a team name composed of an acronym, selected the name Creation and based the team's logo around the idea of pillars emanating from a central star.

== Racing history ==
In 2003, Creation Autosportif purchased a Lister Storm chassis SA9STRM1BYB053119 GTM002 from the Lister factory for use in the FIA GT Championship, with backing from Stuff magazine as a major sponsor. By the seventh round at Anderstorp, the team purchased a second Storm for use in the championship. The team took their best result at Motorsport Arena Oschersleben, with a second-place finish behind a JMB Racing Ferrari. Scoring points in all but one round, Creation was able to take fourth place in the teams championship.

Creation continued in FIA GT in 2004, but decided to switch back to a one car team. They achieved a best finish of fourth at Hockenheimring before the team dropped out of FIA GT after the round at Imola, due to various problems with their Lister Storms.

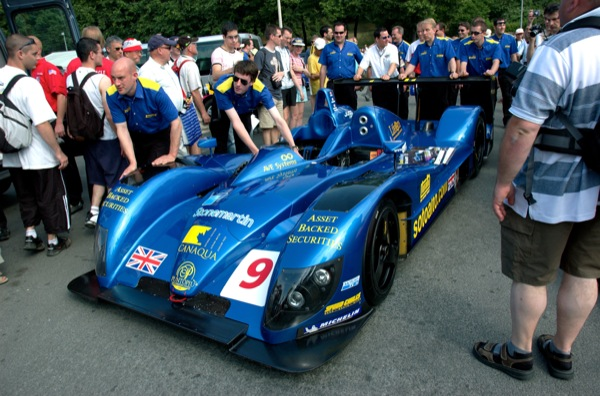
Creation Autosportif's newer CA06/H at the 2006 24 Hours of Le Mans.

Creation instead chose to concentrate on their new endeavour, a Le Mans prototype the team had purchased from RN Motorsport known as a DBA 03S, which was in fact a modified Reynard 02S. The team would use their 03S in the newly founded Le Mans Endurance Series, managing to take two third-place finishes in the four race season, earning them fourth place in the teams championship. The team also flew to the United States to participate in the final two rounds of the American Le Mans Series season, including the Petit Le Mans. The car failed to finish either time, but was notable for claiming pole position at Mazda Raceway Laguna Seca ahead of the dominant Audi R8s.

Creation continued with their DBA 03S in the Le Mans Endurance Series in 2005, improving with a best finish of second at the home race at Silverstone Circuit. The team eventually finished 5th in the teams championship. The team also received their first ever invitation to the 24 Hours of Le Mans, successfully bringing their 03S home 14th overall.

For 2006, Creation's 03S was no longer legal and had to be modified in order to meet Le Mans Prototype regulations. With the assistance of engineering firm KWM, the DBA 03S was upgraded and rehomologated as the Creation CA06/H. The team also switched from their older Zytek engines to newer and larger Judds. With this new car, the team continued in the Le Mans Endurance Series (now renamed the Le Mans Series), taking another best finish of second at the Nürburgring. A second CA06/H was added to the team at Donington Park, where the team managed to take both second and third. At the end of the season, the team finished second in the teams championship, earning themselves an automatic invitation to the 2007 24 Hours of Le Mans.

Elsewhere in 2006, Creation returned again to Le Mans to attempt to finish the classic endurance race. The car failed to finish. The team also returned to the American Le Mans Series, finishing fourth at the Petit Le Mans after taking pole and then finishing third at Laguna Seca.

== Plans ==
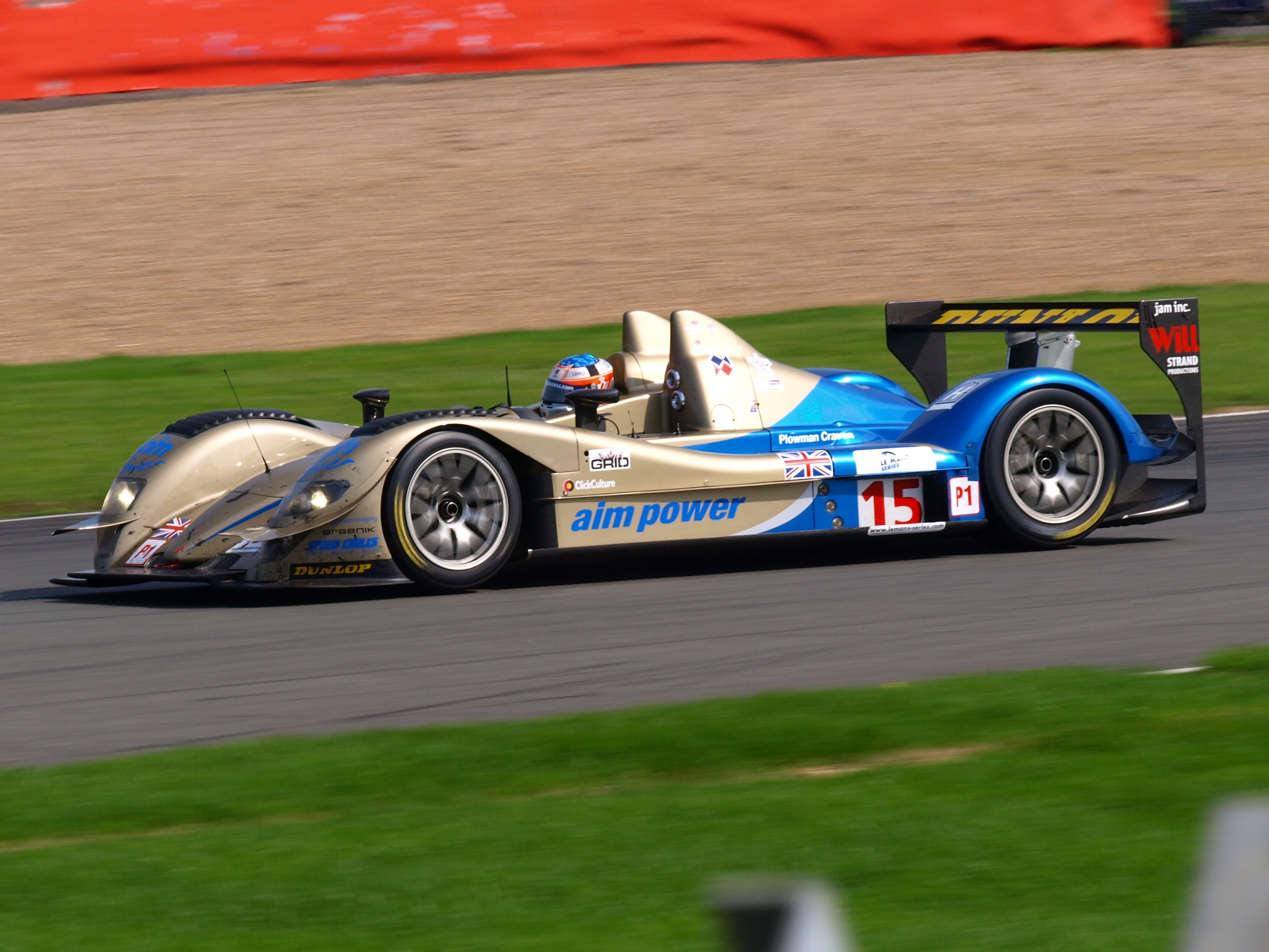
Creation's CA07, now carrying an AIM V10 engine, competing in the 2008 Le Mans Series season

In 2007, in order to meet new Le Mans prototype regulations, Creation will construct an all new chassis, known as the CA07, with plans for a two car team and possibly even customer chassis to be sold in the future. The team will again concentrate on the Le Mans Series and 24 Hours of Le Mans, with possibly participation in American Le Mans Series events.

The team has also made an agreement with Japanese firm AIM to use their new V10 motors in 2008, replacing their aged Judds. The CA07 chassis may also be modified by the team into a closed-cockpit car, in anticipation of future Le Mans Prototype regulations.

Creation also managed to sell their two CA06/H chassis to Intersport Racing and Autocon Motorsports for use in the American Le Mans Series, where the older chassis is still legal. The two teams received assistance from Creation in racing their purchases.
