= Borg-Warner T-5 transmission =

Manual transmission by BorgWarner

T-5
- Classification: manual transmission
- Application: longitudinal engine automobiles
- Weight: 75 lb (34 kg) dry
- Input torque: 300 lb⋅ft (410 N⋅m) max

The BorgWarner T-5 is a 5-speed manual transmission for longitudinal engine automobiles. It includes one overdrive gear, a lightweight aluminum housing, and adaptability for four wheel drive use.

Originally designed by Borg-Warner for use in production automobiles primarily for GM and Ford. The transmission was later built by TREMEC Corporation after BorgWarner sold off their manual transmission business. The last year a production car offered the T-5 was in the V-6 Mustangs as recently as the 2010 models. Tremec continues to offer one version of the T5 as an aftermarket replacement for 1983-1993 Mustangs. This one is referenced as the 1352-000-251.

The T-5 was originally designed by Borg-Warner based on the T-4 and earlier SR4, and was sold as the Borg-Warner T-5 until the design was sold to TTC (aka Tremec) in the late 1990s. The SR4 was a light-duty 4-speed manual that used ball and needle bearings on the countershaft with bronze synchronizer rings. The T4 improved this design with tapered roller bearings on the input and output shafts and a straight roller bearing on the counter gear. The T-5 is a T4 with an added overdrive gear. The T-5 carries a part number of 1352-000-xxx, where xxx is a three-digit application-specific number ranging from 001 to 260 that also can be used to distinguish World Class from Standard T-5 transmissions.

The first T-5s were installed in the AMC Spirit/Concord. In 1982, GM began fitting the T-5 to the S-10/S-15 compact pickup trucks; then in 1983, both Ford (Mustang) and GM (Camaro/Firebird) picked up the T-5 for their pony cars.

The T-5 has become a popular restomod option for older and classic manual transmission cars, as the overdrive gear can improve fuel economy. In general, retrofitting the T-5 is straightforward for many rear-drive Fords from the 1960s and 1970s, as they are dimensionally compatible.

== Models ==
Differences between World Class and Standard transmissions
Feature	WC	STD
Bearings under gears	Needle	Journal
Blocker rings	Fiber-lined steel	Brass
Countershaft bearings	Tapered roller	Straight roller

The T-5 is available in "World Class" (WC) and "Standard" (STD) models; STD are sometimes known as Non-World Class (NWC). Compared to the Standard, the WC changes bearing types and blocker ring materials. Externally, the tapered roller bearing race for the countershaft at the front of the WC, facing the clutch and below the input shaft, can be distinguished from the corresponding straight roller bearing cup of the STD. If this is not visually accessible, the color of the synchronizer rings can be used to distinguish the two types, with the oil fill plug removed. WC transmissions should be filled with automatic transmission fluid, while STD models use 50W gear oil.

STD transmissions are rated at up to 265 lb⋅ft (359 N⋅m) of input torque with a 2.95:1 first gear. Most STD transmissions have a first gear of 3.75 to 4.10:1 for smaller-displacement engines; these so-called 4-cylinder T-5s are rated up to 240 lb⋅ft (330 N⋅m) of input torque.

WC transmissions initially carried the same maximum input torque rating of 265 lb⋅ft (359 N⋅m) until hardened first gears were introduced in approximately 1990, raising the rating to 300 lb⋅ft (410 N⋅m). Typical first gear ratios for the WC ranged from 3.35 to 3.97:1; the Ford Mustang SVO had a unique 3.50:1 first gear for 1986.

== Applications ==
- 1982-83 AMC Spirit
- 1982-83 AMC Concord
- 1982-88 AMC Eagle
- 1982-86 Jeep CJ-7
- 1984-86 2.5L Inline 4, 2.8L V6, and turbo diesel Jeep Cherokee XJ/Comanche MJ
- 1984-86 Ford Mustang SVO (World-Class T-5 1985-1986)
- 1983.5-1995 V8 Ford Mustang (World-Class T-5 1985-1995)
- 1993-1995 V8 Ford Mustang SVT Cobra (BorgWarner T-5)
- 1983.5-1986 V8 Mercury Capri (World-Class T-5 1985-1986)
- 1994-2010 V6 Ford Mustang
- 1983-1993 Inline-4 Ford Mustang
- 1983-1986 Inline-4 Mercury Capri
- 1983-1988 Ford Thunderbird Turbo Coupe and Mercury Cougar XR-7
- 1986-2004 Ford Falcon
- 1985-1987 Ford Sierra RS Cosworth
- 1988 Ford Sierra RS500 Cosworth
- 1988-1989 Ford Sierra Cosworth Sapphire 2wd
- Chevrolet S-10 Blazer
- 1983-1992 Chevrolet Camaro (Non-World-Class T-5 to 1987 and World Class from 1988 - 1992with RPO code MK6)
- 1993-2002 Chevrolet Camaro (V6 models World-Class)
- 1986-1989 Chevrolet Astro
- 1986-1989 GMC Safari
- 1982-1995 Chevrolet S-10
- 1982-1983 (Datsun) Nissan 280ZX Turbo
- 1984-1986 Nissan 300ZX Turbo
- 1989-1995 Holden Commodore VN - VS S1
- Panther Solo 2
- 1983-1992 Pontiac Firebird (Non-World-Class T-5 to 1987 and World Class from 1988 - 1992 with RPO code MK6)
- 1993-2002 Pontiac Firebird (V6 models World-Class)
- Ssangyong Musso
- Ssangyong Korando
- TVR Griffith 500
- TVR Chimaera 500
- TVR Cerbera
- TVR Tuscan with the option of a close ratio gearset on 1st, 2nd & 3rd gears for the Tuscan S
- TVR T350
- TVR Tamora
- TVR Sagaris with the option of the close ratio gearset used in the Tuscan S
