= List of Top Gear test track Power Lap times =

This is the full list of official Power Lap times on the Top Gear test track.

== Qualifying vehicles ==
Top Gear define a qualifying vehicle as a road-legal production car on road-legal tires that has sufficient ride height to clear a standard speed bump. For these reasons the McMurtry Spéirling (0:55.9), F1 car (Renault R24) (0:59.0), Pagani Zonda R (1:08:5), Aston Martin DBR9 (1:08.6) and Sea Harrier (0:31.2) do not appear. Whenever a non-qualifying vehicle is raced, the time is compared to the official power laps but then subsequently removed from the board. For example, the Ferrari FXX owned by Michael Schumacher (1:10.7) was taken off the board because it both failed to meet road legal standards and used slick tyres, and the Caparo T1 (1:10.6) was removed because its front wing was too low to drive over a speed bump.

Time	Vehicle	Episode
01:09.6	Aston Martin Valkyrie	Stig Laps series
01:09.84	Praga Bohema	Ben Collins
01:10.9	Koenigsegg Jesko Attack	Stig Laps series
01:11.3	Ferrari SF90 Stradale Assetto Fiorano	Series 29, Episode 01
01:12.7	Ferrari 488 Pista	Series 27, Episode 01
01:12.8	Dallara Stradale	Series 27, Episode 03
01:13.3	Porsche 992 GT3 RS (Manthey Kit)	Stig Laps series
01:13.4	Porsche 991 GT2 RS	Series 26, Episode 03
01:13.7	McLaren 675LT	Series 23, Episode 02
01:13.7	Ford Mustang GTD	Stig Laps series
01:13.8	Pagani Huayra	Series 19, Episode 01
01:14.3	BAC Mono	Series 20, Episode 02
01:14.8	Porsche 992 GT3 RS	Stig Laps series
01:15.1	Ariel Atom V8 500 (moist - first appearance of new white Stig)	Series 16, Episode 01
01:15.1	Dodge Viper ACR	Series 23, Episode 01
01:15.1	McLaren 600LT	Series 27, Episode 01
01:15.7	Audi R8 V10 Plus	Series 23, Episode 03
01:15.8	Lamborghini Huracán LP610-4	Series 22, Episode 01
01:16.0	Mercedes-AMG GT R (partly damp)	Series 24, Episode 06
01:16.1	Porsche 991 GT3 RS	Series 24, Episode 06
01:16.2	McLaren MP4-12C	Series 17, Episode 03
01:16.5	Lamborghini Aventador LP700-4	Series 17, Episode 06
01:16.6	Maserati MC20	Series 32, Episode 04
01:16.8	Bugatti Veyron Super Sport	Series 15, Episode 05
01:17.1	Gumpert Apollo S	Series 11, Episode 06
01:17.3	Ascari A10	Series 10, Episode 09
01:17.5	Mercedes-AMG GTS	Series 22, Episode 04
01:17.6	Koenigsegg CCX (with the Top Gear Wing)	Series 08, Episode 04
01:17.6	Honda NSX (second generation)	Series 23, Episode 06
01:17.6	Porsche Taycan Turbo S	Series 28, Episode 03
01:17.7	Noble M600 (cold)	Series 14, Episode 05
01:17.8	Nissan GT-R (2012)	Series 17, Episode 04
01:17.8	Pagani Zonda Roadster F (Clubsport Version)	Series 12, Episode 04
01:17.9	Caterham Seven Superlight R500 (cold)	Series 12, Episode 06
01:18.3	Bugatti Veyron 16.4	Series 12, Episode 04
01:18.4	Pagani Zonda F	Series 07, Episode 04
01:18.9	Maserati MC12	Series 06, Episode 02
01:19.0	Lamborghini Murciélago LP670-4 SuperVeloce	Series 13, Episode 02
01:19.0	Mercedes-Benz SLS AMG Black Series	Series 20, Episode 04
01:19.0	Ferrari Enzo	Series 05, Episode 02
01:19.1	Ferrari 458 Italia	Series 15, Episode 06
01:19.5	Lamborghini Gallardo LP560-4	Series 12, Episode 01
01:19.5	Porsche 997 GT2	Series 12, Episode 01
01:19.5	Ariel Atom 2 300	Series 05, Episode 09
01:19.6	Mercedes-Benz SLS AMG Roadster	Series 18, Episode 02
01:19.7	Aston Martin V8 Vantage	Series 26, Episode 05
01:19.7	Mercedes AMG E63 S	Series 26, Episode 02
01:19.7	Nissan GT-R	Series 11, Episode 05
01:19.7	Ferrari 430 Scuderia	Series 11, Episode 01
01:19.8	BMW M5 (F90)	Series 26, Episode 02
01:19.8	Chevrolet Corvette C7 Stingray (written as Corvette S'ray)	Series 22, Episode 05
01:19.8	Ferrari 599 GTO	Series 16, Episode 02
01:19.8	Lamborghini Murciélago LP640	Series 09, Episode 05
01:19.8	Porsche Carrera GT	Series 04, Episode 04
01:20.4	Chevrolet Corvette C6 ZR1 (damp)	Series 14, Episode 02
01:20.4	Koenigsegg CCX (without Top Gear Wing)	Series 08, Episode 01
01:20.7	Ascari KZ1 (damp)	Series 07, Episode 01
01:20.9	Mercedes-Benz SLR McLaren	Series 04, Episode 02
01:21.0	Mercedes-Benz C63 AMG Black Series	Series 18, Episode 05
01:21.22	Ferrari 599 GTB Fiorano	Series 10, Episode 03
01:21.4	Alfa Romeo Giulia Quadrifoglio	Series 24, Episode 02
01:21.5	Aston Martin DB11	Series 24, Episode 03
01:21.5	Tesla Model 3 AWD Performance	Series 27, Episode 02
01:21.6	Porsche Cayman GTS	Series 22, Episode 05
01:21.6	BMW F80 M3	Series 24, Episode 02
01:21.6	Porsche 718 Cayman S	Series 24, Episode 07
01:21.6	Jaguar F-Type R Coupé	Series 22, Episode 07
01:21.6	Audi R8 V10 (damp)	Series 14, Episode 02
01:21.7	Chevrolet Corvette C8 Stingray (damp)	Series 31, Episode 03
01:21.7	Mercedes-Benz SLS AMG Electric Drive	Series 20, Episode 04
01:21.7	Lamborghini Urus	Series 29, Episode 03
01:21.9	Ford GT	Series 04, Episode 08
01:21.9	Audi RS 6 Avant	Series 29, Episode 03
01:22.2	Porsche 997 Turbo Cabriolet	Series 15, Episode 04
01:22.3	Caterham Seven 620R (wet)	Series 21, Episode 04
01:22.3	Audi R8 V10 Spyder	Series 15, Episode 04
01:22.3	Ferrari 360 Challenge Stradale	Series 04, Episode 03
01:22.3	Porsche 996 GT3 RS	Series 04, Episode 03
01:22.4	Chevrolet Corvette C6 Z06	Series 08, Episode 02
01:22.5	Noble M15	Series 08, Episode 08
01:22.6	Mercedes-AMG C 63 S	Series 27, Episode 02
01:22.7	BMW M2	Series 23, Episode 05
01:22.8	Lexus LFA (wet)	Series 14, Episode 07
01:22.9	Ferrari F430 F1	Series 06, Episode 08
01:22.9	Porsche 911 Sport Classic	Series 15, Episode 02
01:22.9	Alpine A110	Series 25, Episode 06
01:23.0	Mercedes-Benz SL65 AMG Black Series	Series 13, Episode 03
01:23.1	Maserati Gran Turismo MC Stradale	Series 18, Episode 05
01:23.1	Toyota Supra MKV	Series 27, Episode 05
01:23.2	Ferrari F430 Spider F1	Series 06, Episode 08
01:23.3	Jaguar XKR-S	Series 17, Episode 04
01:23.7	Lamborghini Murciélago	Series 03, Episode 04
01:23.8	Pagani Zonda C12 S 7.3 (partly damp)	Series 01, Episode 01
01:23.9	Aston Martin DBS (written as Aston Martin DB9S)	Series 10, Episode 07
01:23.9	Koenigsegg CC8S	Series 02, Episode 07
01:24.0	Ariel Atom	Series 02, Episode 06
01:24.0	Mercedes AMG S63	Series 24, Episode 03
01:24.2	Porsche Panamera Turbo	Series 15, Episode 03
01:24.2	Veritas RS III	Series 12, Episode 06
01:24.3	Prodrive P2 (concept)	Series 08, Episode 05
01:24.4	Audi R8 (damp)	Series 10, Episode 02
01:24.4	Aston Martin Virage	Series 17, Episode 02
01:24.6	TVR Sagaris	Series 06, Episode 07
01:24.8	Alfa Romeo 4C	Series 21, Episode 02
01:24.8	Mitsubishi Lancer Evolution VIII MR FQ-400 (damp)	Series 05, Episode 07
01:24.8	TVR Tuscan Mk.II	Series 06, Episode 03
01:24.9	Bentley Continental GT Supersports	Series 15, Episode 01
01:24.9	Porsche Boxster Spyder	Series 15, Episode 02
01:24.9	Mercedes-Benz E63 AMG	Series 15, Episode 03
01:25.0	Noble M12 GTO-3	Series 02, Episode 10
01:25.0	BMW 1 Series M Coupe (damp)	Series 17, Episode 01
01:25.0	Caterham R400	Series 02, Episode 06
01:25.1	BMW M135i	Series 21, Episode 05
01:25.1	Lotus Exige S	Series 08, Episode 03
01:25.1	Zenos E10 S (Mildly moist / Damp)	Series 23, Episode 05
01:25.3	Ariel Atom 4 (wet)	Series 28, Episode 01
01:25.3	BMW M3 (E90 Saloon)	Series 12, Episode 05
01:25.6	Honda Civic Type R (FK8)	Series 25, Episode 03
01:25.6	Lexus LC500	Series 25, Episode 03
01:25.7	Lotus Evora (written as Lotus Dress Shop)	Series 13, Episode 01
01:25.7	Audi RS4	Series 07, Episode 02
01:25.7	Lamborghini Gallardo Spyder	Series 08, Episode 07
01:25.8	Lamborghini Gallardo (wet)	Series 03, Episode 04
01:25.9	Morgan Aero 8 GTN	Series 05, Episode 05
01:26.0	Mercedes-Benz CLK 63 AMG Black series	Series 11, Episode 02
01:26.0	BMW Z4 M Roadster (E85)	Series 08, Episode 04
01:26.0	Mitsubishi Lancer Evolution VIII MR FQ320	Series 04, Episode 04
01:26.2	BMW M5 (E60)	Series 06, Episode 09
01:26.2	Porsche 911 Carrera S (997) (damp) (written as Porsche Rubbish)	Series 10, Episode 02
01:26.2	BMW M8 Competition (very wet)	Series 28, Episode 06
01:26.2	Brabus S Biturbo Roadster	Series 09, Episode 04
01:26.3	Vauxhall VXR8 Bathurst S	Series 13, Episode 07
01:26.4	Lotus Exige (mildly moist)	Series 04, Episode 01
01:26.5	BMW M3 E92 Competition Pack (moist)	Series 16, Episode 05
01:26.5	BMW M3 (E92)	Series 10, Episode 10
01:26.7	Porsche Cayman S	Series 07, Episode 02
01:26.7	Jaguar XFR (written as Jaaaaag XFR)	Series 13, Episode 05
01:26.8	Chevrolet Corvette C6 LS2	Series 04, Episode 10
01:26.8	Aston Martin V12 Vantage (Not Shown on TV)	Series 13, Episode 07
01:26.8	Ferrari 575M Maranello GTC	Series 05, Episode 04
01:26.9	Lexus IS-F	Series 12, Episode 05
01:26.9	Mercedes-Benz CLS55 AMG	Series 06, Episode 01
01:27.0	Renault Mégane Sport	Series 26, Episode 03
01:27.0	KTM X-Bow	Series 18, Episode 06
01:27.0	BMW M5 E39	Series 01, Episode 08
01:27.1	Aston Martin Vanquish S	Series 05, Episode 04
01:27.1	Aston Martin DB9	Series 04, Episode 01
01:27.1	HSV Maloo	Series 13, Episode 07
01:27.2	Porsche 996 GT3 (very wet)	Series 03, Episode 01
01:27.2	Tesla Roadster (mildly moist)	Series 12, Episode 07
01:27.3	Spyker C8 Spyder (with hard top)	Series 04, Episode 07
01:27.4	Aston Martin DBS (wet)	Series 10, Episode 07
01:27.5	Audi RS5 (moist)	Series 16, Episode 05
01:27.5	Nissan 370Z GT	Series 13, Episode 06
01:27.5	TVR T350C	Series 02, Episode 10
01:27.5	Eagle Low Drag GT	Series 22, Episode 07
01:27.7	Cosworth Impreza STI CS400 (wet) (written as Subaru Cossie)	Series 16, Episode 03
01:27.7	Honda Civic Type R (FK2)	Series 23, Episode 03
01:27.7	Renault Mégane RenaultSport Cup 265	Series 19, Episode 04
01:27.9	Wiesmann MF 3	Series 06, Episode 03
01:27.9	Chevrolet Camaro SS	Series 15, Episode 03
01:28.0	Ford Mustang GT	Series 23, Episode 06
01:28.0	Roush Mustang	Series 09, Episode 06
01:28.0	BMW M3 CSL (E46) (wet - first appearance of white Stig)	Series 03, Episode 02
01:28.0	TVR T350C	Series 01, Episode 10
01:28.1	Renault Mégane R26.R	Series 13, Episode 04
01:28.2	BMW Z4 sDrive35i (E89)	Series 13, Episode 06
01:28.2	BMW X5 M (E70) (wet)	Series 14, Episode 04
01:28.2	Marcos TSO GT2	Series 07, Episode 05
01:28.2	Lotus Elise Sport 190	Series 02, Episode 06
01:28.2	Subaru Impreza WRX STI	Series 11, Episode 02
01:28.22	Mitsubishi Lancer Evolution X FQ-300	Series 11, Episode 02
01:28.3	Vauxhall Astra VXR	Series 19, Episode 04
01:28.5	Dodge Viper SRT-10 (very wet)	Series 05, Episode 03
01:28.5	BMW 645Ci	Series 04, Episode 05
01:28.6	Volkswagen Golf GTI Mk7 (with performance pack)	Series 21, Episode 05
01:28.6	MG XPower SV	Series 03, Episode 07
01:28.7	Porsche Boxster S	Series 05, Episode 07
01:28.9	BMW 330i (self-driving car with Jeremy Clarkson as the passenger)	Series 10, Episode 08
01:28.9	Mitsubishi Lancer Evolution VIII MR FQ-300	Series 02, Episode 06
01:28.9	Porsche 997 Carrera S (very wet)	Series 05, Episode 01
01:29.0	Mercedes-Benz CL65 AMG	Series 04, Episode 09
01:29.0	Lamborghini Murciélago (partly damp)	Series 01, Episode 01
01:29.0	Alpina Z8 Roadster	Series 02, Episode 03
01:29.2	BMW M5 (F10) (Very Wet)	Series 18, Episode 07
01:29.3	Ford Focus RS Mk II	Series 13, Episode 04
01:29.4	Subaru Impreza WRX STI WR1	Series 04, Episode 04
01:29.4	Range Rover Sport	Series 20, Episode 06
01:29.6	Volkswagen Golf GTI W12-650 Concept	Series 10, Episode 01
01:29.6	Ford Focus ST	Series 19, Episode 04
01:29.6	Volkswagen Golf GTI Mk VII (Sport Mode)	Series 20, Episode 03
01:29.9	Zenvo ST1 (very wet)	Series 21, Episode 03
01:30.0	Ford Shelby GT500	Series 09, Episode 06
01:30.0	Autodelta Alfa Romeo 147 GTA 3.7	Series 04, Episode 02
01:30.1	Subaru Impreza WRX STi	Series 02, Episode 06
01:30.1	Vauxhall Monaro VXR	Series 06, Episode 11
01:30.3	Alfa Romeo Giulietta Quadrifoglio Verde	Series 24, Episode 02
01:30.4	Maserati MC20 (very wet)	Series 32, Episode 04
01:30.4	Aston Martin DB7 GT (with full tank of fuel)	Series 02, Episode 04
01:30.4	Volkswagen Golf R32 mk.V	Series 07, Episode 06
01:30.8	Ariel Nomad	Series 23, Episode 01
01:30.8	Ford Focus RS 500 (wet)	Series 16, Episode 03
01:30.9	Audi S4 quattro 4.2	Series 02, Episode 02
01:31.0	Vauxhall Corsa VXR Nurburgring (partly snowy)	Series 18, Episode 03
01:31.0	Porsche 996 Turbo (wet)	Series 02, Episode 05
01:31.2	BMW 760Li (wet)	Series 14, Episode 01
01:31.3	Vauxhall VXR8 (wet)	Series 10, Episode 08
01:31.3	Vauxhall VX220 Turbo	Series 02, Episode 06
01:31.3	Toyota GT86 (partly wet)	Series 19, Episode 03
01:31.4	Audi TT Mk.II 2.0T	Series 09, Episode 02
01:31.6	Honda NSX Type-R (wet)	Series 03, Episode 09
01:31.8	BMW M3 E46	Series 02, Episode 02
01:31.8	BMW 535d (E60)	Series 06, Episode 10
01:31.8	Nissan 350Z	Series 03, Episode 05
01:31.8	Mazda RX-8	Series 03, Episode 05
01:31.9	BMW 130i (E87)	Series 07, Episode 06
01:31.9	Lotus Esprit V8 (cold tyres)	Series 01, Episode 10
01:32.0	Peugeot RC (wet)	Series 01, Episode 07
01:32.0	Mazda RX-8	Series 09, Episode 02
01:32.0	Renaultsport Clio 200	Series 20, Episode 01
01:32.0	Mazda MX-5	Series 22, Episode 07
01:32.1	Mercedes-Benz S63 AMG (wet)	Series 14, Episode 01
01:32.2	Ford Focus RS Mk I	Series 01, Episode 02
01:32.2	Mazda 6 MPS	Series 08, Episode 06
01:32.3	Renaultsport Mégane 225 Cup	Series 06, Episode 09
01:32.5	Lotus Esprit V8 (cold tyres)	Series 01, Episode 10
01:32.7	Ford Fiesta ST	Series 20, Episode 01
01:32.7	Audi TT 3.2 quattro	Series 03, Episode 08
01:32.8	Honda Civic Type-R (2004 Facelift)	Series 05, Episode 06
01:32.8	Jaguar E-Type (modernised)	Series 06, Episode 05
01:32.9	Noble M12 GTO (wet)	Series 01, Episode 02
01:32.9	SEAT León Cupra R	Series 05, Episode 06
01:32.9	Mercedes-Benz SLK350	Series 05, Episode 07
01:33.0	Audi RS6 (very wet)	Series 01, Episode 08
01:33.0	Vauxhall Astra VXR	Series 06, Episode 09
01:33.1	Noble M12 GTO (wet)	Series 01, Episode 02
01:33.2	Mercedes-Benz SL55 AMG (owned by Jeremy Clarkson at the time) (very wet)	Series 01, Episode 06
01:33.2	Peugeot 208 GTi	Series 20, Episode 01
01:33.3	Audi Q7 V12 (wet)	Series 14, Episode 04
01:33.3	Volkswagen Golf Mk.IV R32	Series 01, Episode 09
01:33.4	Cadillac CTS-V First Generation (very wet)	Series 06, Episode 04
01:33.5	Honda Civic Type-R (FN2-2007)	Series 10, Episode 06
01:33.7	MG ZT 260	Series 04, Episode 05
01:33.7	Volkswagen Golf Mk.V GTI	Series 05, Episode 06
01:33.7	Honda NSX-R (very wet)	Series 01, Episode 06
01:33.8	Clio Renault Sport 182	Series 04, Episode 06
01:33.9	Holden Monaro (written as Loser) (wet)	Series 03, Episode 06
01:34.0	Renault Mégane 225	Series 05, Episode 06
01:34.0	MG ZR	Series 01, Episode 08
01:34.0	Renault Clio 200 Cup (Not Shown on TV)	Series 17, Episode 02
01:34.2	MINI Cooper S Works	Series 05, Episode 06
01:34.5	Ford Mondeo ST220	Series 08, Episode 06
01:34.6	Hyundai i30N (very wet)	Series 25, Episode 04
01:34.7	Jaguar XKR (melted snow)	Series 09, Episode 01
01:34.9	Ford Focus ST (written as Asbo ST) (foggy)	Series 07, Episode 03
01:34.9	Lotus Elise (wet)	Series 01, Episode 07
01:35.0	Nissan 300ZX	Series 13, Episode 05
01:35.0	Volvo S60 R	Series 02, Episode 09
01:35.2	Ferrari 575M Maranello (very wet)	Series 01, Episode 04
01:35.3	Vauxhall Vectra VXR	Series 08, Episode 06
01:35.4	Renault Avantime (written as "Our Car" - post-tuning by presenters)	Series 12, Episode 03
01:35.5	Fiat 500 Abarth Essesse SS	Series 12, Episode 02
01:35.5	Mercedes-Benz E55 AMG (very wet)	Series 01, Episode 08
01:35.6	Alfa Romeo 147 GTA	Series 02, Episode 08
01:35.6	Lotus Elise (wet)	Series 01, Episode 07
01:35.8	Citroën C4 VTS	Series 05, Episode 06
01:35.9	BMW 325i (E93) (wet)	Series 16, Episode 04
01:36.2	Aston Martin Vanquish (very wet)	Series 01, Episode 04
01:36.2	Renault Clio V6 Sport (very wet, spin before finishline)	Series 02, Episode 05
01:36.5	Ford F-150 Hennessey VelociRaptor (wet)	Series 22, Episode 06
01:36.5	Honda Civic Type R	Series 01, Episode 02
01:36.9	Alfa Romeo Brera 2.2	Series 09, Episode 02
01:37.0	Mercedes-Benz SL500 (Ronnie O'Sullivan's)	Series 04, Episode 04
01:37.0	Porsche Boxster (very wet)	Series 03, Episode 02
01:37.3	BMW Z4 3.0i (very wet) (E85)	Series 03, Episode 02
01:37.4	Honda S2000 (very wet)	Series 03, Episode 02
01:37.8	Eagle Low Drag GT (very wet)	Series 22, Episode 07
01:37.9	Saab 9-5 Aero	Series 03, Episode 03
01:38.0	Maserati 4200 GT (very wet)	Series 01, Episode 08
01:38.06	Honda Civic Type-R (EP3)	Series 01, Episode 02
01:38.2	Alfa Romeo 8C Competizione (very wet)	Series 11, Episode 04
01:39.0	Subaru Impreza WRX (Europe-spec)	Series 01, Episode 02
01:39.3	Volkswagen Golf GTI Mk7 (very wet)	Series 25, Episode 04
01:39.4	Bowler Wildcat	Series 02, Episode 01
01:39.7	Dacia Sandero	Series 26, Episode 04
01:40.4	Morgan 3 Wheeler (written as Morgan Tricycle)	Series 18, Episode 06
01:40.8	Bentley Arnage T (wet)	Series 01, Episode 05
01:41.0	Ford Mondeo 2.0i	Series 01, Episode 04
01:42.5	Renault Avantime (written as "Our Car" - pre-tuning by presenters)	Series 12, Episode 03
01:43.0	Mercedes-Benz C-Class (W203)	Series 01, Episode 04
01:43.2	BMW 318i (E46)	Series 01, Episode 04
01:44.0	Overfinch 580 S (very wet)	Series 02, Episode 10
01:44.0	Honda Accord	Series 01, Episode 04
01:44.4	Suzuki Liana	Series 08, Episode 02
01:45.0	Renault Laguna	Series 01, Episode 04
01:45.0	Toyota Avensis	Series 01, Episode 04
01:45.2	Kia Ceed (melted snow)	Series 19, Episode 04
01:45.5	Caterham 7 160 (wet)	Series 21, Episode 04
01:46.0	Aston Martin DB5	Series 06, Episode 05
01:46.0	Jaguar X-Type	Series 01, Episode 04
01:46.0	Suzuki Liana (Driven by Black Stig)	Series 01, Episode 01
01:46.9	Skoda Fabia VRS	Series 04, Episode 08
01:47.0	Porsche 911 Turbo (very wet)	Series 02, Episode 10
01:48.2	Hawk HF3000 (wet) (Kit car with Alfa Romeo V6 engine – spun twice during timed lap)	Series 14, Episode 03
01:48.3	Mini Cooper	Series 04, Episode 08
01:49.1	Smart Fortwo Brabus (very wet)	Series 24, Episode 04
01:49.2	Renault Twingo GT (very wet)	Series 24, Episode 04
01:49.4	Volkswagen Up! TSI (very wet)	Series 24, Episode 04
01:50.3	Bentley Meteor 'Spitfire engine in a car'	Series 18, Episode 06
02:02.0	Ford Transit World Rally	Series 01, Episode 08
02:02.5	Brutus	Series 18, Episode 06
18:37.0	Porsche Pain Au Chocolat (foot pedalled by Richard Hammond)	Series 15, Episode 05
unknown	Jamie Oliver's VW Campervan (with Jamie cooking in)	Series 02, Episode 02
unknown	Jaguar XKR-R (spun during the timed lap)	Series 02, Episode 04
DNF	Lamborghini LM002 (ran out of petrol)	Series 03, Episode 04
DNF	Porsche 959 (broke down during lap)	Series 16, Episode 06
DNF	Reliant Robin (rolled on the first corner)	Series 15, Episode 02
DNS	Ferrari F40 (car did not start; broke down at the start line)	Series 16, Episode 06

== Non-qualifying vehicles ==
=== Tested, but subsequently removed from board ===
1. 0:31.2 – BAE Sea Harrier (Piloted by Lieutenant Nick Arkle RN. Raced against the Saab 9-5 Aero. Took off then flew around track, ended in the air) – Series 3, Episode 3
2. 0:55.9 – McMurtry Spéirling fan car – Stig Laps
3. 0:59.0 – Renault R24 Formula One car (Wet) – Series 5, Episode 8
4. 1:03.1 – Ford F-150 Lightning SuperTruck – Stig Laps
5. 1:03.8 – Lotus T125 single seater – Series 17, Episode 6
6. 1:05.3 – Ford SuperVan 4.2 – Stig Laps
7. 1:07.2 – McLaren 720S GT3X – N/A
8. 1:08.5 – Pagani Zonda R – Series 16, Episode 4
9. 1:08.6 – Aston Martin DBR9 – Series 6, Episode 6
10. 1:10.6 – Caparo T1 – Series 10, Episode 5
11. 1:10.7 – Ferrari FXX (Driven by Michael Schumacher on slick tyres) – Series 13, Episode 1
12. 1:13.2 – McLaren MP4-12C GT3 (driven by Stig) on slick tyres – N/A
13. 1:14.0 – Lamborghini Sesto Elemento – Series 20, Episode 5
14. 1:14.3 – McLaren 570S GT4 – Driven by Bono Huis – N/A
15. 1:15.2 – Aston Martin Vulcan (Damp) – Series 23, Episode 4 (Jokingly added by Chris Evans to a "Naughty Laps" board)
16. 1:1?.? – CAP 232 Aerobatic Plane (Piloted by British Aerobatic Champion, Tom Cassells. Raced against the Radical SR3 and was shown crossing the finish line in front, however the time was not shown.) – Series 1, Episode 9
17. 1:19.1 – Radical SR3 – Series 01, Episode 09
18. 1:19.8 – Radical SR3 – Series 02, Episode 06
19. 1:22.6 – Westfield XTR2 – Series 01, Episode 03
20. 1:23.4 – Ford GT40 – Series 05, Episode 08
21. 1:26.6 - Apache Helicopter - Series 04, Episode 01
22. 1:27.5 – Audi Quattro A2 B2 (Typ 85Q) – Series 05, Episode 08
23. 1:28.3 – Bizzarrini 5300 GT Corsa Revival – N/A
24. 1:28.7 – Audi TT MTM Bimoto (cold tyres) – Series 01, Episode 10
25. 1:29.4 – AS One – Series 01, Episode 10
26. 1:30.0 – James Bond's Aston Martin DB5 – Series 30, Episode 02
27. 1:35.2 – Ford Escort RS1600 – Series 05, Episode 08

=== Driven to establish times in challenges ===
1. 1:35.9 – 2010 BMW 325i (E93) (Driven as modern-day equivalent to set target time for the late '80s BMW 325i (E30)s in the '4-seat convertibles for under £2,000' challenge.) (wet, top open)
2. 1:42.0 – Rover 416 GTI (Hammond's car in the '£100 car' challenge.)
3. 1:43.0 – Porsche 944 (May's car in the '£1500 Porsche' Challenge.)
4. 1:44.0 – Porsche 924 (Hammond's car in '£1500 Porsche' Challenge, time not stated, but they did say it was slower than May's 944. Hammond's score on the board stated he scored -9 points in the challenge, meaning he finished 9 seconds over the target time of 1:35.0.)
5. 1:45.0 – Porsche 928 S (Clarkson's car in '£1500 Porsche' Challenge.)
6. 1:46.0 – Audi 80 1.8E (May's car in '£100 car' challenge.)
7. 1:48.0 – Volvo 760 GLE V6 (Clarkson's car in '£100 car' challenge.)
8. 1:48.0 – Vauxhall Astra Diesel Police car (Driven as modern-day equivalent to set target time in 'Budget Police Car' challenge.)
9. 1:48.0 – 1988 BMW 325i (E30) convertible (Clarkson's car in '4-seat convertibles for under £2,000' challenge, automatic and paving slab in boot. Driven by Clarkson. The engine was severely damaged by the run.)
10. 1:55.3 – 1987 BMW 325i (E30) convertible (Hammond's car in '4-seat convertibles for under £2,000' challenge, lowered suspension. Driven by Hammond.)
11. 1:55.4 – 1989 BMW 325i (E30) convertible (May's car in '4-seat convertibles for under £2,000' challenge, standard specification. Driven by May.)
12. 2:03.0 – Lexus LS400 (May's police car in 'Budget Police Car' Challenge, driven by May.)
13. 2:08.0 – Fiat Coupé 2.0 20v Turbo (Clarkson's police car in 'Budget Police Car' Challenge, driven by Clarkson. Clarkson started the lap backwards in order to perform a J-turn, hoping to increase his style points, but stalled the car instead.)
14. 2:15.82 – Volkswagen Tiguan whilst Towing a Caravan (Caravanner's Challenge)
15. 2:17.0 – Chevrolet G20 (Hammond's ambulance in 'Ambulance Challenge', driven by the Stig. Track was fitted with 3 speed bumps, which the Chevy was able to clear at speed.).
16. 2:24.0 – Porsche 944 Turbo (Clarkson's ambulance in 'Ambulance Challenge' driven by the Stig. The speed bumps mentioned above slowed down the low-slung Porsche greatly.)
17. 2:57.0 – JCB Fastrac 8250 (Clarkson's tractor in the 'Tractor' Challenge.)
18. 3:14.0 – Suzuki Vitara 1.6 JLX (Hammond's police car in 'Budget Police Car' Challenge, driven by Hammond. Hammond left the track to drive through piled cardboard boxes and increase his style points. Car broke down after crossing line.)
19. 3:28.4 – Fendt 930 Vario (May's tractor in the 'Tractor' Challenge.)
20. 4:49.0 – Case STX Steiger (Hammond's tractor in the 'Tractor' Challenge.)
21. 12:28.0 – Ford Scorpio Cardinal (May's ambulance in 'Ambulance Challenge' driven by the Stig, includes time for raising and mending powered tailgate).
22. DNF – Mazda CX-5 whilst towing a caravan (Caravanner's Challenge, Caravan Fell onto its side on the second to last corner, lifting rear wheels of car in the air)

== Unofficial laps ==
Independently reported lap times, not in connection with Top Gear series:

1. 1:05.3 – Nissan ZEOD RC hybrid mode (internal combustion engine and electric motors).
2. 1:12.6 – McLaren 720S - Series 25
3. 1:12.8 – Ultima GTR. After Top Gear allegedly refused to drive it because "they thought it couldn't clear a speed bump", Ultima Sports, Ltd. drove the car from Surrey to the track and set the time, verified by Plans Motorsport.
4. 1:13.2 – McLaren P1 tested by Motor Trend 2014
5. 1:13.6 – Nissan ZEOD RC pure-electric vehicle mode.
6. 1:14.2 – Ferrari LaFerrari. Set on 12 June 2015 in damp conditions by Jason Plato as part of television programme TFI Friday's twentieth-anniversary show
7. 1:32.0 – Fiat Multipla - Set in 2019 by Stig (according to the video) driving the modified and engine-tuned Fiat Multipla "Multipla AMG" (151.8 hp - 336Nm - 1236 kg) from Vilebrequin's YouTube Channel (French).

== Time adjustments ==
Sometimes an additional term is written next to the time (such as Hot). This indicates that The Stig and the Top Gear team consider that the prevalent weather conditions have affected the lap time or car's performance. The time on the board is not changed: e.g. 1:50 MM (Mildly Moist) is deemed to be equivalent to 1:48 on a normal dry track. The following list describes how many seconds it costs a car or gives a car an advantage. These adjustments are also not applicable to Formula 1 drivers.

Term	Conditions	Adjustment
Hot/Cold	Track surface or car performance affected by high/low temperature or humidity	−1 second
Mildly moist (MM) / Damp (D)	Track surface slightly damp with some dry patches after light rain or drizzle	−2 seconds
Moist (M)	Track surface slightly wet due to shower of rain	−3 seconds
Wet (W) / Melted snow (MS)	Track surface wet due to light rain or melted snow	−4 seconds
Very wet (VW)	Track surface very wet (with large puddles) due to heavy rain	−6 seconds
