= Speed Six =

Speed Six may refer to:

- Bentley Speed Six, British sports car produced between 1926 and 1930
- Ruger Speed-Six, American revolver produced between 1972 and 1988
- Speed Six!, children's book by Richard Hough (a.k.a. Bruce Carter)
- TVR Speed Six engine, British car engine produced between 1999 and 2007
