= TVR Tamora =

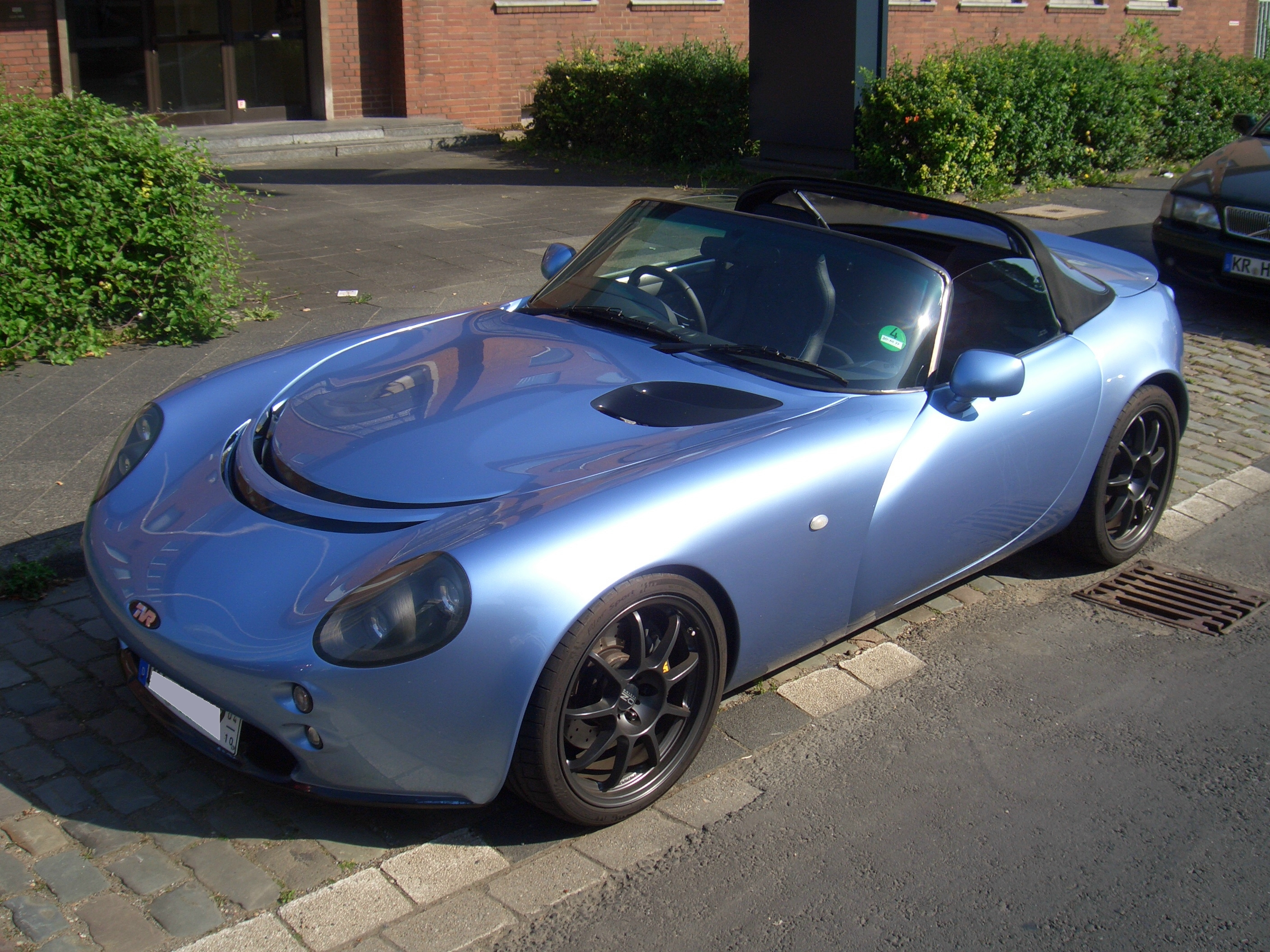

Overview
- Manufacturer: TVR
- Production: 2002–2006; 356 produced
- Assembly: United Kingdom: Blackpool, England
- Designer: Lee Hodgetts, Darren Hobbs (exterior); Damien McTaggart (interior)

Body and chassis
- Class: Sports car (S)
- Body style: 2-door roadster
- Platform: Fibreglass body over tubular steel chassis
- Related: TVR T350; TVR Tuscan Speed Six

Powertrain
- Engine: 3.6 L Speed Six I6
- Transmission: 5-speed manual

Dimensions
- Wheelbase: 2,361 mm (93.0 in)
- Length: 3,925 mm (154.5 in)
- Width: 1,715 mm (67.5 in)
- Height: 1,204 mm (47.4 in)
- Kerb weight: 1,050 kg (2,315 lb) (dry)

Chronology
- Predecessor: TVR Chimaera; TVR Griffith (First Generation)

The TVR Tamora is a 2-seater sports car built from 2002 by British company TVR, filling the gap left by the company's Chimaera and Griffith models. Introduced at the 2000 Birmingham Motor Show, the car is named after Tamora, a character in William Shakespeare's play Titus Andronicus and served as an entry-level model in the TVR range. Peter Wheeler was no longer directly responsible for design and the car was designed by a team led by Damian McTaggart (also responsible for the interior), but Wheeler still had final approval.

== History and development ==
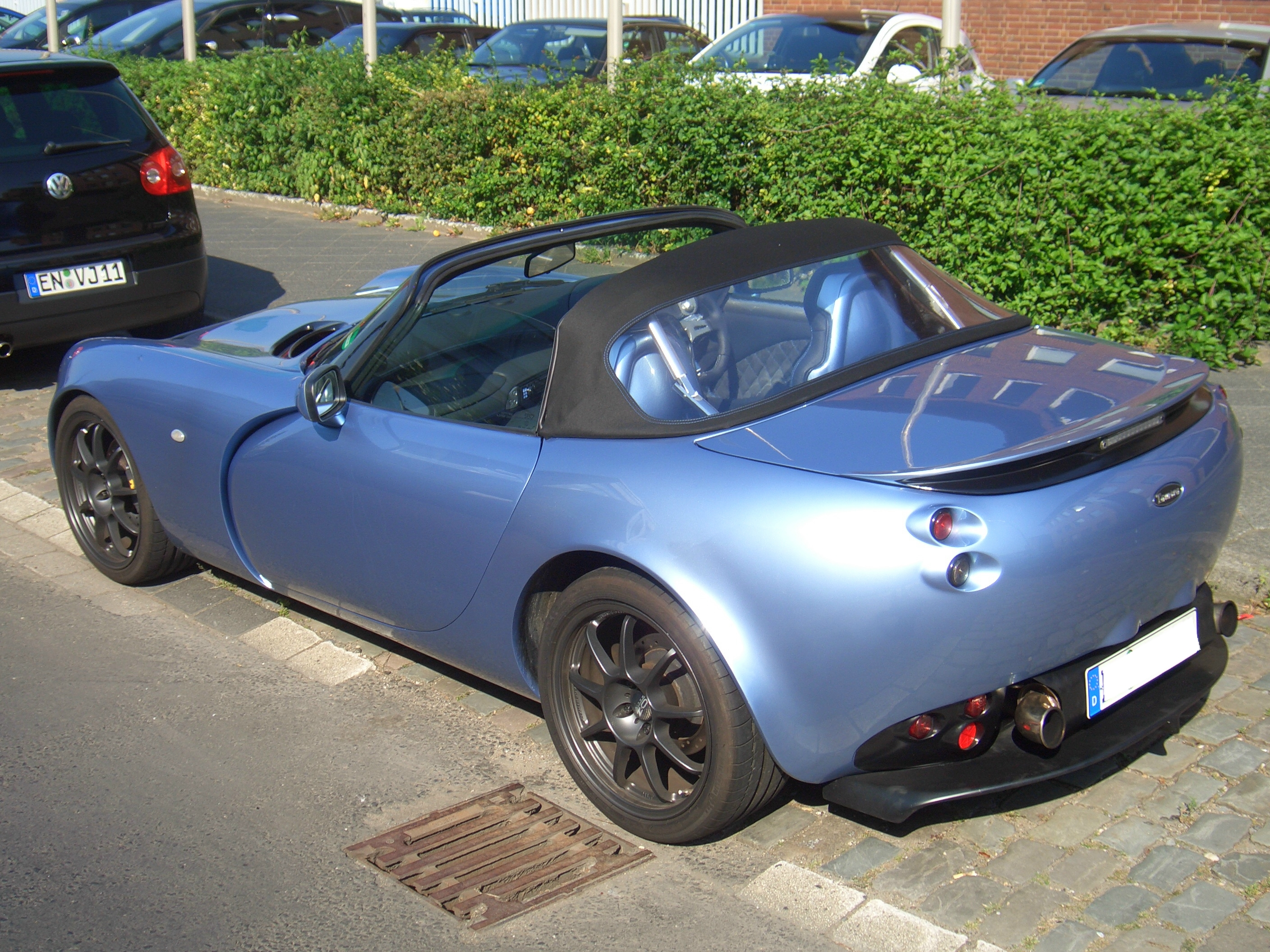
TVR Tamora rear

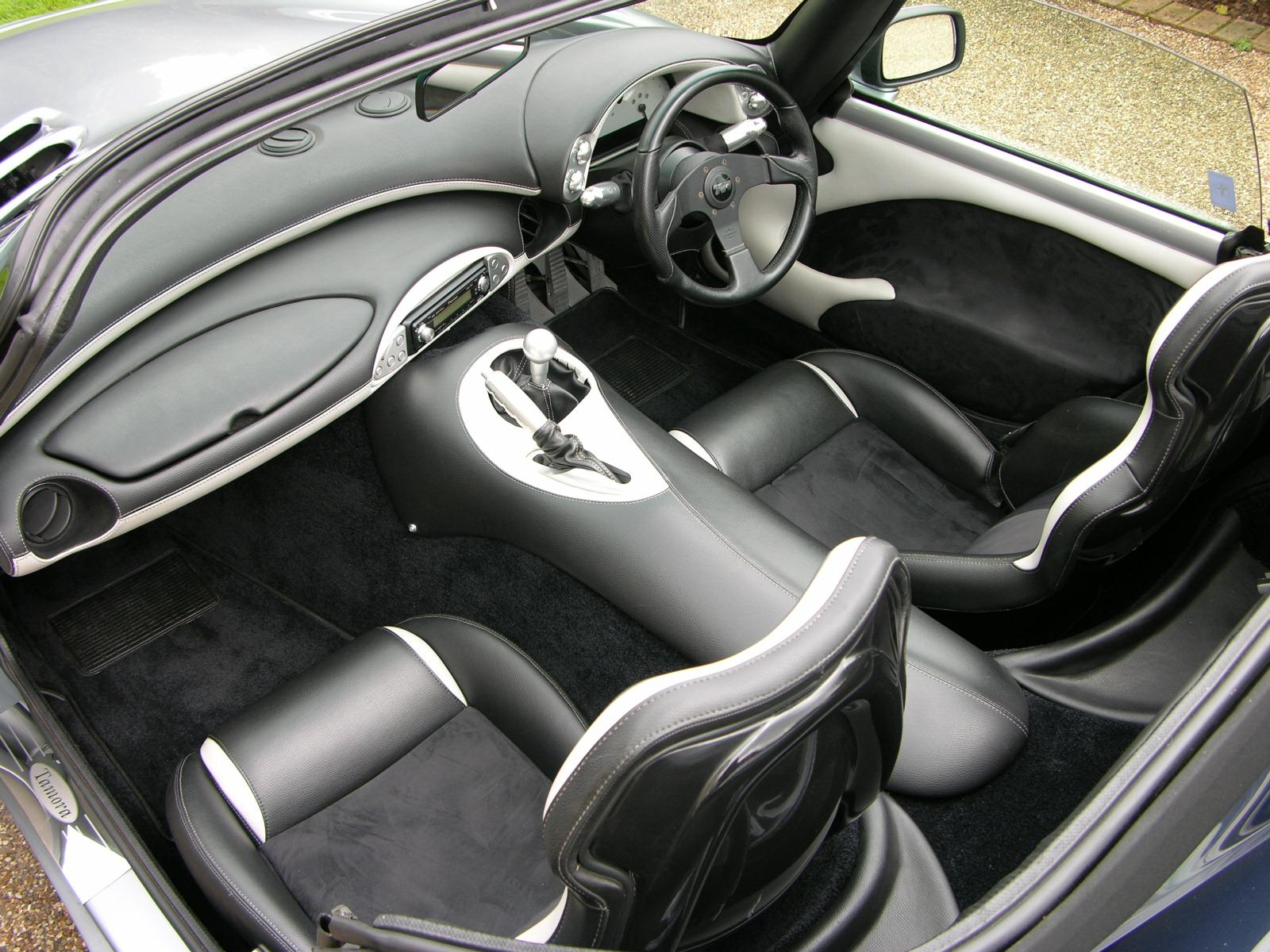
Interior

The Tamora was intended to be a more practical and urban-friendly model in the TVR range. Based on the Tuscan Speed Six, the Tamora used the same chassis and suspension as the Tuscan. The engine was a short-stroked version of the 4.0 litre Speed Six found on the Tuscan now displacing 3.6 litres. Keeping with TVR tradition, the car still lacked driver's aids such as ABS and traction control, but was fitted with a power steering and a softer clutch for easy manoeuvrability. The Tamora was not a sales success due to reliability issues, high price and divisive styling. Only 356 cars were made before it was discontinued in 2006.

== Specifications ==
The Tamora is fitted with TVR's in-house 'Speed Six', a DOHC 3,605 cc (3.6 L) six-cylinder engine rated at 350 hp (261 kW) at 7,200 rpm and 290 lb⋅ft (393 N⋅m) of torque at 5,500 rpm, mated to a five-speed manual gearbox. Brake rotors are 12.0 inches (300 mm) up front, and 11.1 inches (280 mm) in the back. The braking system was manufactured by AP Racing. The suspension is a double wishbone setup at all four corners. Standard wheels are 16×7 inch aluminium, with 225/50ZR-16 Avon ZZ3 tyres, although most cars were ordered with 18" wheels and 225/35/18 tyres on the front, 235/40/18 on the rear.

The Tamora is built on a 93-inch (2,400 mm) wheelbase, and the car's overall profile is 154.5 inches (3,920 mm) long, 67.5 inches (1,710 mm) inches wide and 47.4 inches (1,200 mm) high. It weighs 2,337 lb (1,060 kg) with 58/42 weight distribution.

The interior featured leather upholstery with aluminium switches and an adjustable steering column. The Tamora came with amenities such as central locking, electrically operated windows, boot release and wing mirrors and an engine immobiliser.

According to Autocar magazine, the Tamora is capable of accelerating from 0–60 mph (97 km/h) in 4.2 seconds, and completes the quarter mile in 12.5 seconds at 119 mph (192 km/h). The top speed is over 170 mph (270 km/h).

The Tamora also provided the base for the T350 coupé.
