= TVR Speed Six engine =

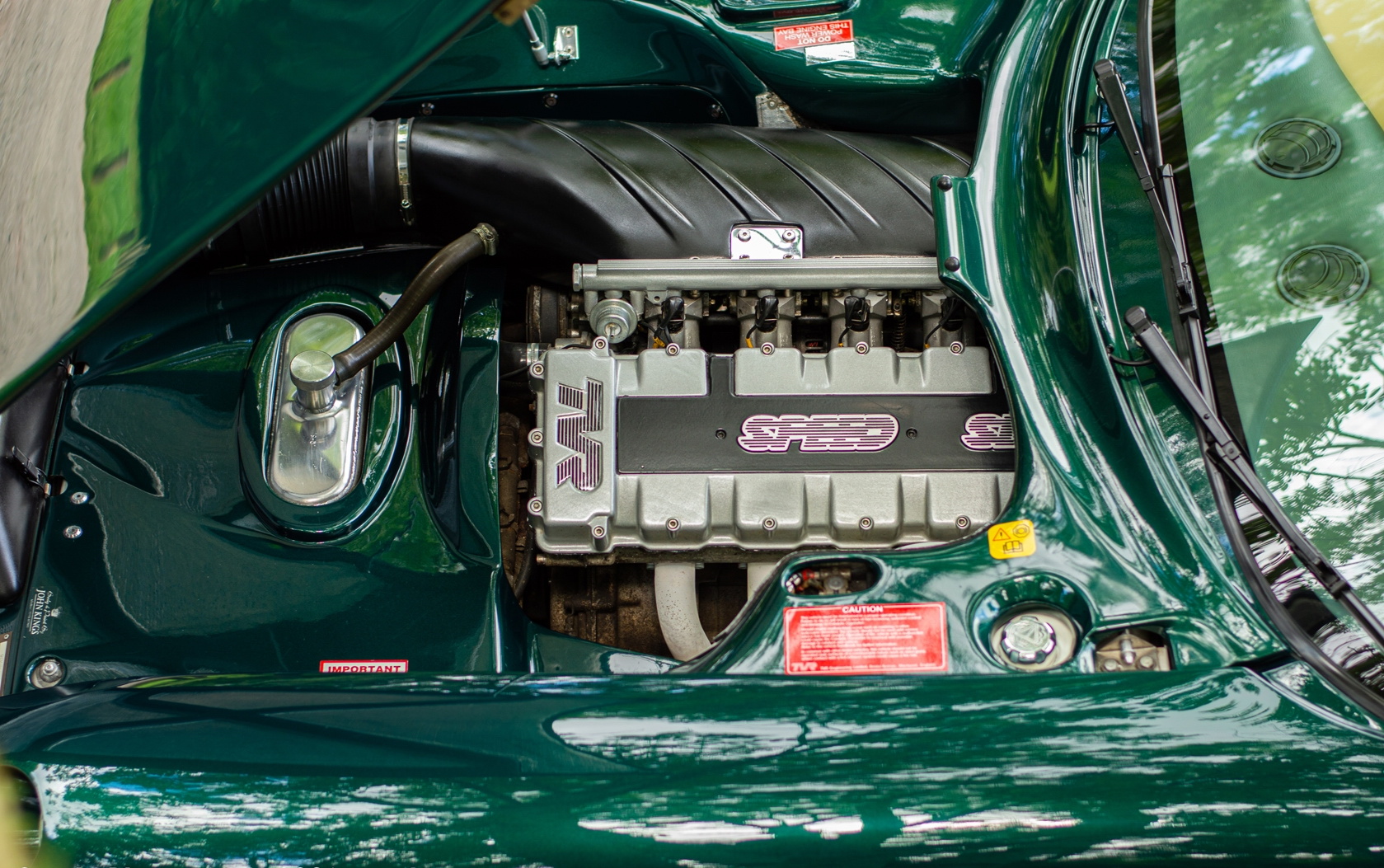
- Engine installed in a TVR Cerbera

Overview
- Manufacturer: [Kevin Glassbrook, Urbanhurst Uk Ltd]
- Designer: Al Melling
- Production: 1999 – 2007

Layout
- Configuration: Naturally aspirated Straight-6
- Displacement: 3,605 cc (3.6 L; 220.0 cu in), 3,996 cc (4.0 L; 243.9 cu in)
- Cylinder bore: 96 mm (3.78 in)
- Piston stroke: 83 mm (3.27 in); 92 mm (3.62 in)
- Cylinder block material: Aluminium alloy
- Cylinder head material: Aluminium alloy
- Valvetrain: DOHC 4 valves per cylinder
- Compression ratio: 11.0:1, 11.8:1, 12.2:1

Combustion
- Fuel system: Multi-point fuel injection
- Fuel type: Petrol engine
- Oil system: Dry sump
- Cooling system: Water-cooled

Output
- Power output: 350 bhp (355 PS; 261 kW) at 6800 rpm; 390 bhp (395 PS; 291 kW) at 7000 rpm; 406 bhp (412 PS; 303 kW) at 7000-7500 rpm
- Torque output: 290 lb⋅ft (393 N⋅m) at 5500 rpm; 310 lb⋅ft (420 N⋅m) at 5250 rpm; 330 lb⋅ft (447 N⋅m) at 5000 rpm; 349 lb⋅ft (473 N⋅m) at 5000 rpm

The TVR Speed Six was the name of a naturally aspirated straight-six engine manufactured from 1999 to 2007 by British car manufacturer TVR, and used in several of their cars including the Tuscan, Cerbera, Tamora, T350, Sagaris and Typhon.

The engine's prototypes (referred to as AJP-6) were designed and delivered by independent engineer Al Melling (the "A" in AJP) as both 3.0 and 3.5 litre units. Many of its key cylinder head design elements (particularly the valvetrain) were first seen in the 1991 Suzuki GSX-R750 (M) motorcycle engine (also a Melling design).

The key design features were an all aluminium alloy block and head, with cast iron cylinder liners, double overhead camshafts, finger follower 24-valve actuation, one throttle and injector per cylinder (throttle-body fuel injection), equal length tubular exhaust manifolds dual 3-way catalytic converters and a dry sump lubrication system allowing the engine to be mounted lower in the vehicle chassis. These features enabled the engine to provide lightweight, compact dimensions, extremely fast throttle response and high peak horsepower.

In order to reduce unit production costs, the engines that actually went into production, called Speed Six, were TVR modified versions of the initial AJP-6 prototypes with 3.6 litres (3,605 cc) and 4.0 litres (3,996 cc) capacities. Prominent modifications were alterations to valve train geometry, a switch from a billet steel crank to cast iron (with a crank damper), different connecting rods, oil filter relocation to the inlet side of the engine, and removal of the exhaust cam oil feed. The two different capacities were achieved through stroke alterations from a con-rod design able to accommodate two different stroke lengths, and different piston crown designs altering the compression ratios. The bore diameters were shared. Pistons were made in Italy by Asso Werke from pre-existing casts, initially designed for the Rotax-Aprilia RSV 1000 engine. Those casts, refused by Rotax, were modified and used to produce the smaller Speed Six pistons.

Unfortunately, during TVR’s development of the original MCD design, it was decided to remove the drilled lubrication oil-ways from the camshaft centres to the peak of each of the camshaft lobes, resulting in starvation of lubrication and early versions of the Speed Six engine suffering from poor valve-train durability leading to many warranty claims against TVR.

German and French tuners and owners have, since, re-introduced these oil-ways, returning the motor to its original, efficient and reliable design.

Other third party development work has also mitigated this issue by using revised material hardness for the cam lobes, finger followers and valve guides. Softer valve springs and valves with thicker stems were also utilised. Engines that have had these modifications performed have also improved durability.

The initial 4.0 litre version of the engine as used in the Cerbera produced 350 bhp (355 PS; 261 kW) with the final incarnations of the engine having TVR claimed outputs of 406 bhp (412 PS; 303 kW) in the Tuscan S, Sagaris and Typhon and being the most powerful naturally aspirated straight-six engine in any production road car.

TVR further developed the Speed Six into the limited-production V12 Speed Twelve racing engine. TVR also experimented with supercharging the Speed Six engine for use in the Typhon/T440 model. However this proved unsuccessful due to cooling challenges so the few Typhon/T440 models that made production were instead fitted with standard naturally aspirated 4.0L Speed Six engines.
