= TVR Tuscan Speed Six =

2-door sports car

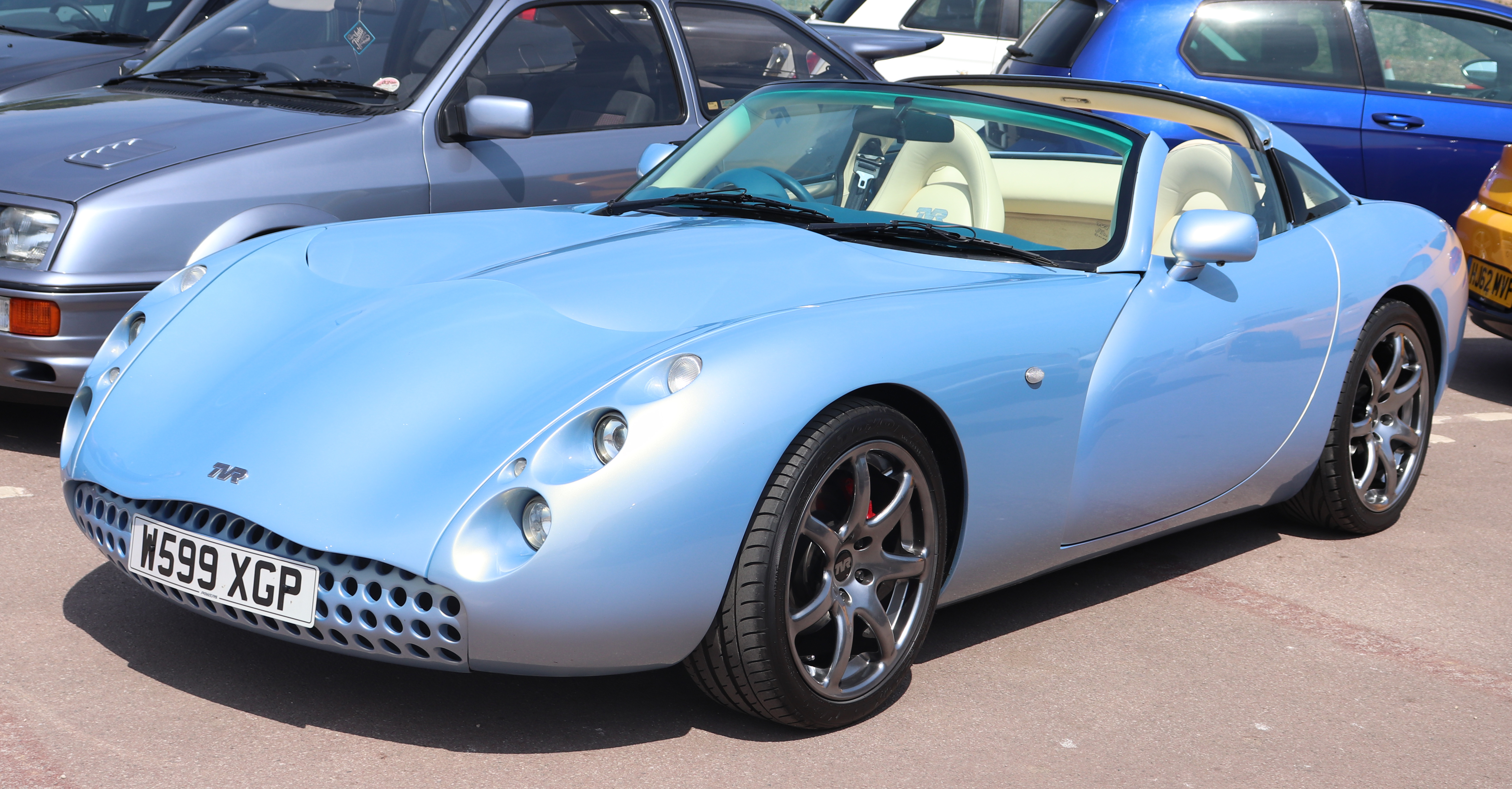

Overview
- Manufacturer: TVR
- Production: 1999–2006; 1,677 produced
- Assembly: United Kingdom: Blackpool, England
- Designer: 1999 MK1 Tuscan: Damian McTaggart (exterior); Paul Daintree (interior); 2004 Tuscan MK2: Grahame Browne (Exterior) Martin Smith (Interior)

Body and chassis
- Class: Sports car (S)
- Body style: 2-door targa top; 2-door convertible
- Layout: Front mid-engine, rear-wheel drive
- Platform: Fiberglass body over tubular steel chassis
- Related: TVR Sagaris; TVR T400R

Powertrain
- Engine: 3.6 L (3,605 cc) Speed Six I6; 4.0 L (3,996 cc) Speed Six I6; 4.2 L (4,200 cc) Speed Six I6
- Transmission: 5-speed manual

Dimensions
- Wheelbase: 2,336 mm (92.0 in)
- Length: 4,235 mm (166.7 in)
- Width: 1,810 mm (71.3 in)
- Height: 1,200 mm (47.2 in)
- Kerb weight: 1,100 kg (2,425 lb)

The TVR Tuscan Speed Six is a sports car which was manufactured by British company TVR from 1999 to 2006. The name pays homage to the original Tuscan which was introduced in 1967.

== History ==
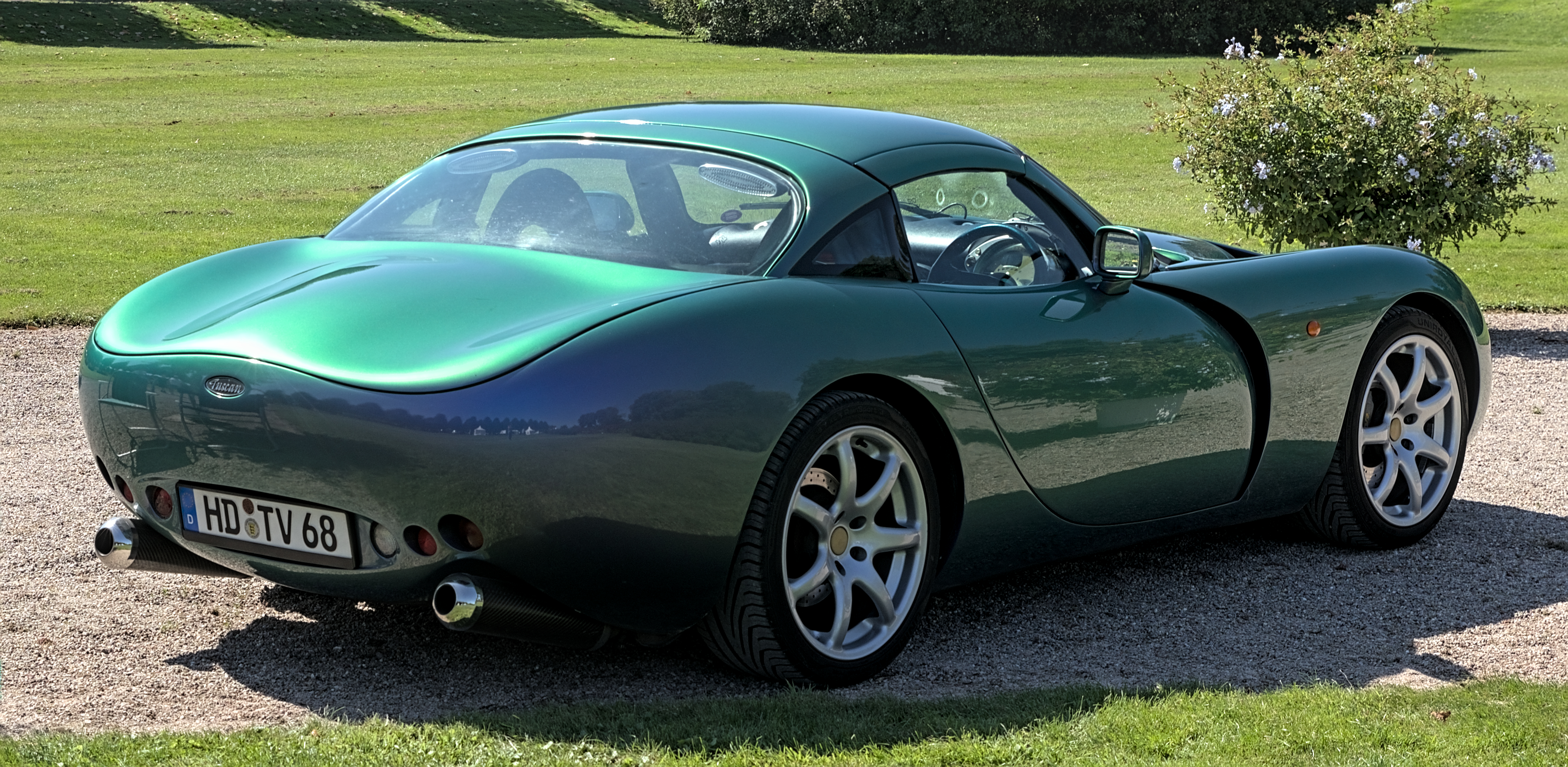
TVR Tuscan Speed Six

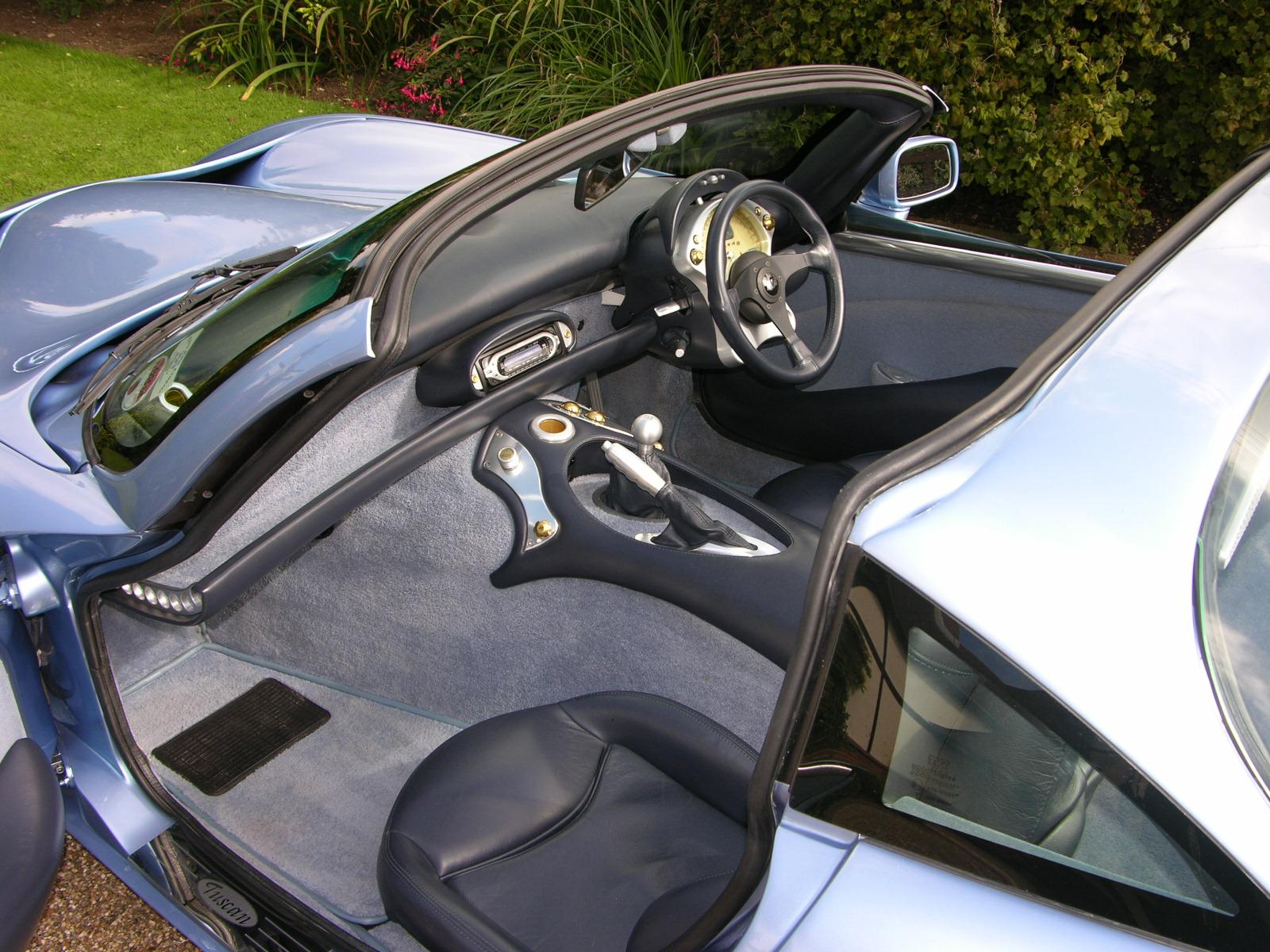
Interior

The Tuscan Speed Six was introduced in 1999 and was available for media demonstration in 2000. The reason being that then owner Peter Wheeler imposed a ban on press reviews of the car. Initially, the Tuscan Speed Six was fitted with the 4.0 litre version of the TVR Speed Six engine rated at 360 hp (365 PS) at 7,000 rpm and 420 N⋅m (310 lb⋅ft) of torque at 5,250 rpm. Later, a Red Rose pack option raised the power output to 380 hp (385 PS), bringing with it track-focused chassis upgrades as well as an AP Racing braking system. The high-performance Tuscan S was the top-of-the-line model, rated at 390 hp (395 PS), and had aerodynamic improvements over the base models, most notably a rear lip spoiler to improve downforce.

=== Facelift ===
The Tuscan Speed Six underwent a facelift in 2005 and was now called the Tuscan 2. Exterior changes included a redesigned front grille and headlamps along with more conventional taillamps. Mechanical changes included revised spring rates, improved steering response and different suspension geometry to make the car easier to drive on public roads. The base models were detuned to 350 hp (355 PS) and 393 N⋅m (290 lb⋅ft) while still retaining the basic weight figure of 1,100 kg (2,425 lb). The interior was also refreshed and featured a more conventional and ergonomic layout. Production lasted until the closure of TVR in 2006.

== Specifications ==
=== Engine ===
Five different inline-six engine options were offered to customers. Four of these were variants of the naturally aspirated 4.0 L Speed Six fuel fed by multipoint fuel injection making different amounts of power and torque, depending on the trim level selected. The other was a 3.6 L shortened stroke version of the Speed Six engine which produced the same amount of power as the lowest-level 4.0 L engine, although slightly less torque.

- Bore x stroke:

- 96 mm × 83 mm (3.78 in × 3.27 in) 3.6 L; 220.0 cu in (3,605 cc);
- 96 mm × 92 mm (3.78 in × 3.62 in) 4.0 L; 243.9 cu in (3,996 cc)

Engines
Model	Power	Torque
Mark I
3.6L	350 bhp (261 kW; 355 PS)	290 lb⋅ft (393 N⋅m)
4.0L	360 bhp (268 kW; 365 PS)	310 lb⋅ft (420 N⋅m)
4.0L Red Rose	380 bhp (283 kW; 385 PS)	310 lb⋅ft (420 N⋅m)
4.0L S (pre-2003)	390 bhp (291 kW; 395 PS) at 7,000 rpm	310 lb⋅ft (420 N⋅m) at 5,250 rpm
4.0L S (post-2003)	400 bhp (298 kW; 406 PS)	315 lb⋅ft (427 N⋅m)
Mark II
4.0L	380 bhp (283 kW; 385 PS)	310 lb⋅ft (420 N⋅m)
4.0L S	400 bhp (298 kW; 406 PS)	315 lb⋅ft (427 N⋅m)
4.0L Convertible	360 bhp (268 kW; 365 PS)	310 lb⋅ft (420 N⋅m)
4.0L Convertible Red Rose	380 bhp (283 kW; 385 PS)	310 lb⋅ft (420 N⋅m)
4.2L T440R (2003)	440 bhp (328 kW; 446 PS) at 7,600 rpm	350 lb⋅ft (475 N⋅m) at 6,000 rpm

=== Chassis ===
Even though there have been numerous tweaks to the Tuscan's chassis and suspension, the overall size and appearance of the variants remain virtually identical apart from minor aerodynamic aids to the S model in the form of an undertray in the front and a small boot-lid spoiler on the rear.

In October 2005 the "Mk 2" version of the Tuscan was introduced, though in reality this was just a minor facelift. The modifications were restricted to cosmetic changes to the front and rear lights, the dashboard, and the spoilers on the S model plus some minor changes to the chassis to improve the handling. At the same time, a new variant a full soft top was introduced alongside the original targa version.

=== Performance ===
- 0–30 mph (48 km/h): 1.72 s
- 0–60 mph (97 km/h): 3.68 s
- 0–100 mph (161 km/h): 8.08 s
- 100–0 mph: 4.15 s

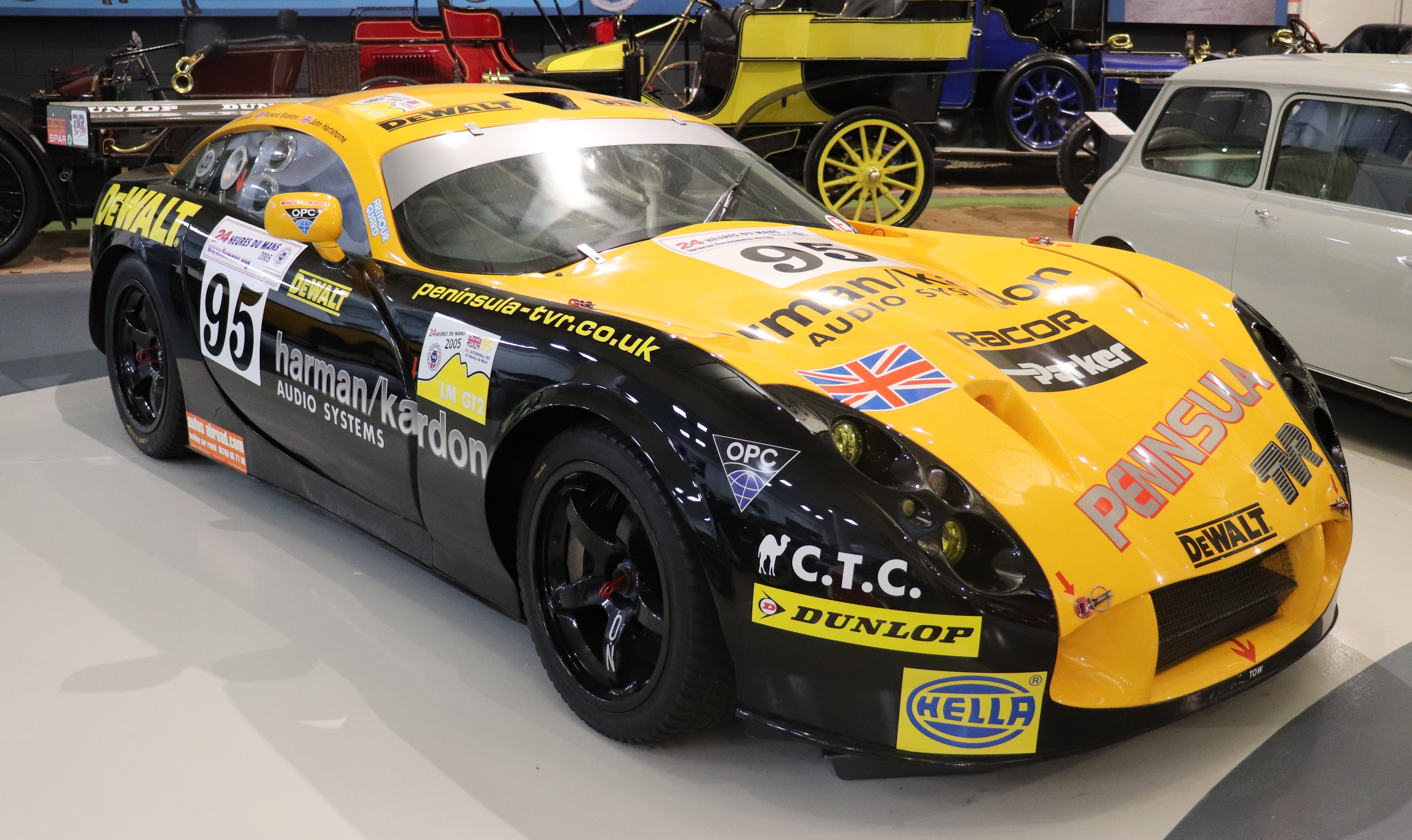
TVR T400R, run by Team LNT in the Le Mans Series

These test results were achieved in a post-2003 Tuscan S without traction-control or anti-lock brakes. TVR's design philosophy holds that such features do not improve either the performance or safety of their vehicles and thus they are not so equipped. TVR rejects the notion that these features, along with airbags, are "safety devices" and believes that, based on testing and experience, their cars are safer without these things than with them.

A modified version of the car was used in the 2003 24 Hours of Le Mans, and again the following year.
