= TVR T350 =

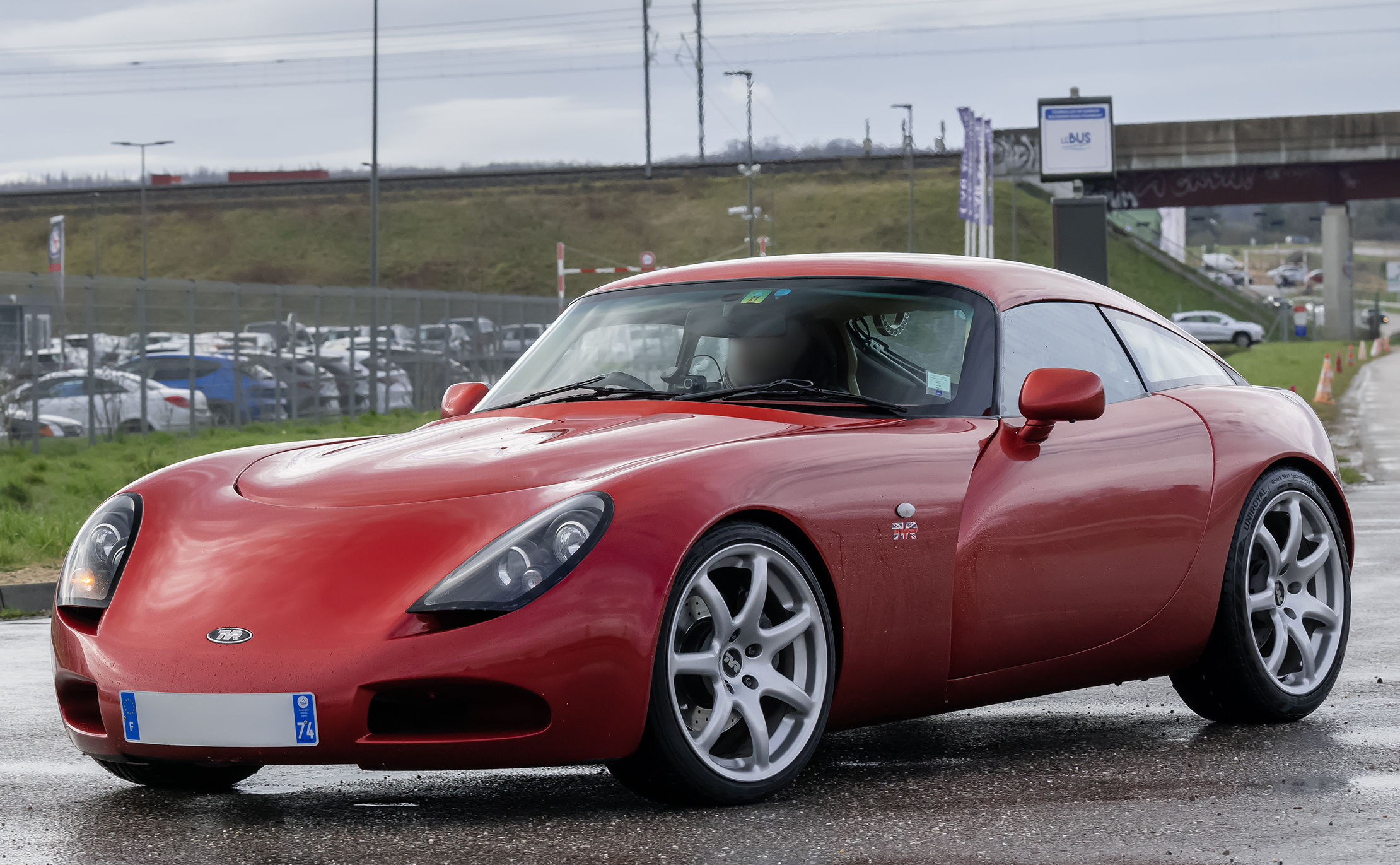

Overview
- Manufacturer: TVR
- Production: 2002–2006; 460 produced
- Assembly: United Kingdom: Blackpool, England
- Designer: Damian McTaggart

Body and chassis
- Class: Sports car (S)
- Body style: 2-door coupe; 2-door targa top
- Layout: Front-engine, rear-wheel drive
- Related: TVR Tamora

Powertrain
- Engine: 3.6 L Speed Six I6
- Transmission: 5-speed manual

Dimensions
- Wheelbase: 2,362 mm (93.0 in)
- Length: 3,975 mm (156.5 in)
- Width: 1,834 mm (72.2 in)
- Height: 1,204 mm (47.4 in)
- Kerb weight: 2,617 lb (1,187 kg) (dry)

Chronology
- Successor: TVR Sagaris

The TVR T350 is a sports car manufactured by British company TVR from 2002 to 2006. It is based on the Tamora, and is powered by TVR's Speed Six engine displacing 3.6 litre form, rated at 350 hp (261 kW). The T350 was available in coupe and targa versions, the coupe version being known as the T350c, and the targa version the T350t. The T350 later formed the base of the Sagaris.

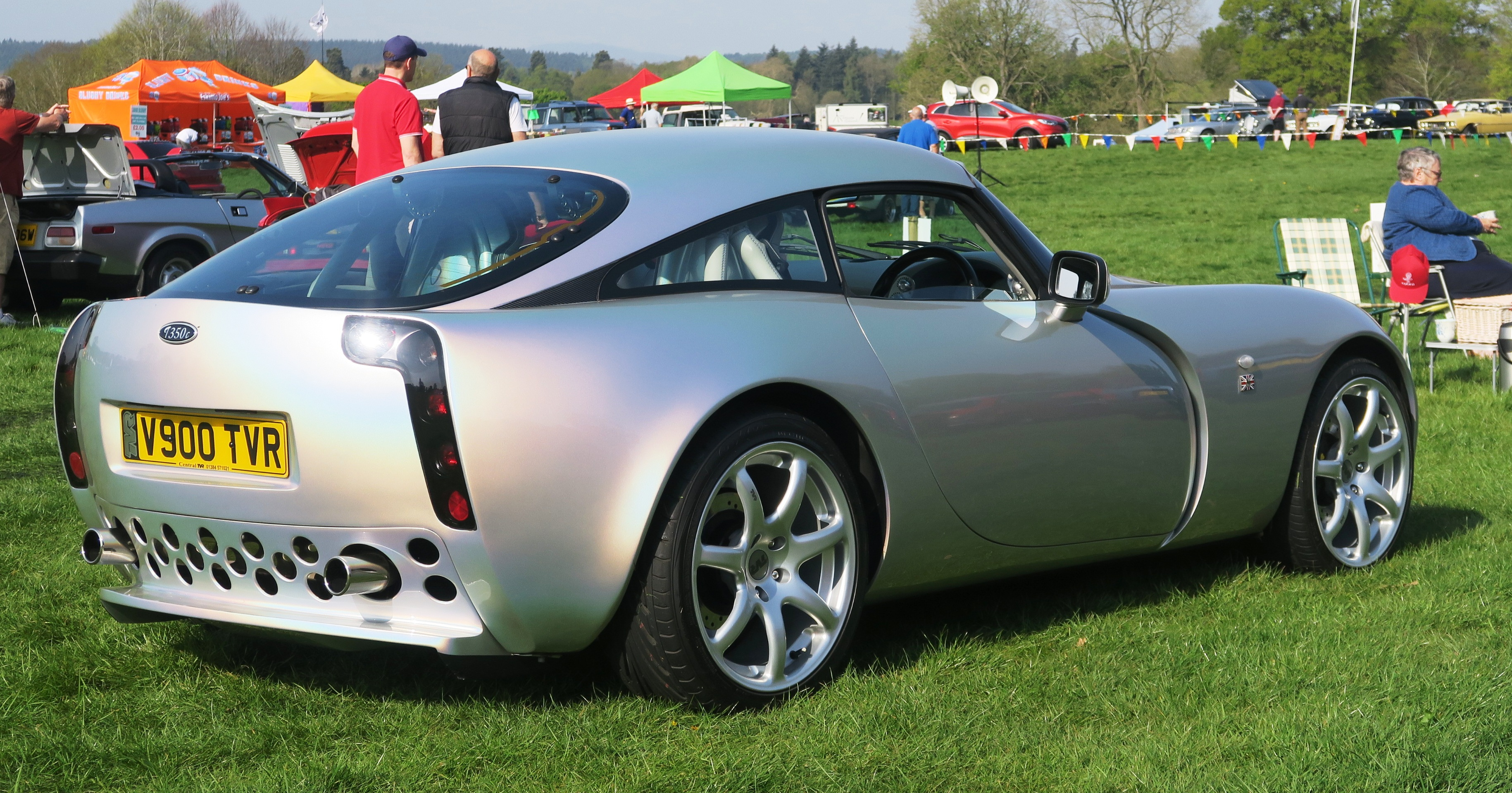
Rear view

The smooth frontal nose and the sharp rear cut tail allows the car to be aerodynamically efficient while reducing drag. The sloping rear line of the car ensures that the car generates minimum lift at high speeds.

The car takes many components from the entry level Tamora such as the interior, multi-function display and analogue metres. The optional Sport package adds extra options in the multi-functional display such as lap-times, oil temperature and water temperature. The fastback design of the car gives the customer an advantage of increased boot space.

== Specifications ==
- Engine: TVR Speed Six engine, Straight-6 (6-cylinder inline alloy engine with 4 valves per cylinder and dry sump lubrication)
- Engine size: 3605 cc (3.6L)
- Bore/stroke: 93 mm (3.7 in) x 83 mm (3.3 in)
- Compression ratio: 11.8:1
- Power output: 350 bhp (261 kW; 355 PS) at 7200 rpm
- Torque output: 290 lb⋅ft (393 N⋅m) at 5500 rpm
- Power-to-weight ratio: 304 bhp/ton
- Valvetrain setup: 4 valves per cylinder

Suspension

- Front: Independent, double wishbones, coil-over gas dampers, sway bars
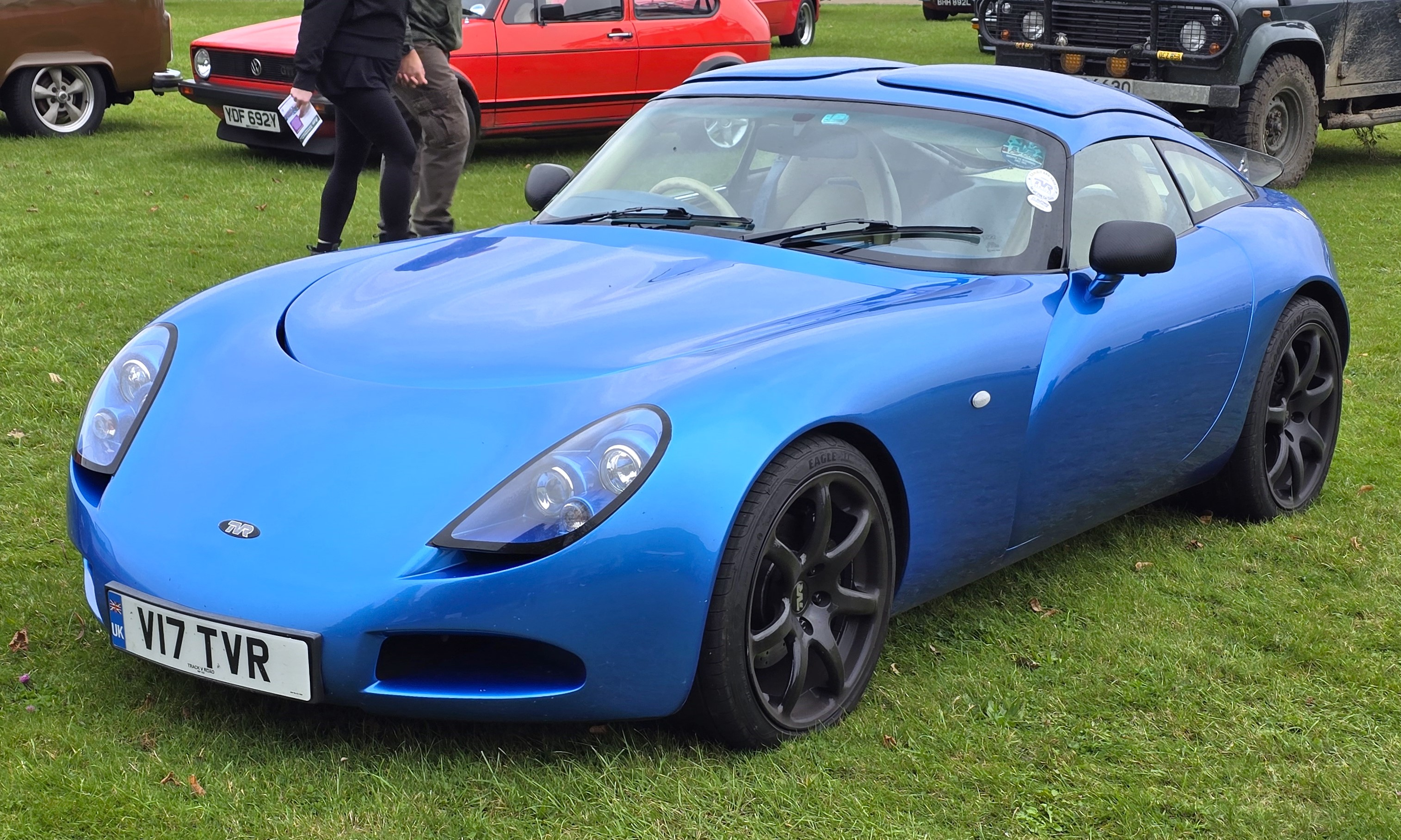
- 2003 TVR T350T
  Rear: Independent, double wishbones, coil-over gas dampers, sway bars

Brakes

- Front: 304 mm (12.0 in) ventilated disc brakes with 4 piston alloy callipers.
- Rear: 282 mm (11.1 in) ventilated disc brakes with single piston sliding callipers.

Wheels

- Wheels: 18 inch seven-spoke spider aluminum alloy wheels in Anthracite or Silver
- Tyres - Front: Goodyear Eagle F1 GDS3 225/35 ZR18 tyres at 24 psi (30 psi Track/sustained high speed / fully laden)
- Tyres - Rear: Goodyear Eagle F1 GDS3 235/40 ZR18 tyres at 24 psi (32 psi Track/sustained high speed / fully laden)

Steering

- Electro Hydraulic Power assisted rack and pinion.

Chassis/body

- Body panels: Glass Reinforced Plastic
- Weight: 2,616 lb (1,187 kg)
- Weight distribution - Front: 51.9% 1,200 lb (544 kg)
- Weight distribution - Rear: 48.1% 1,140 lb (517 kg)
- Length overall: 3,974 mm (156.5 in)
- Wheelbase: 2,361 mm (93.0 in)
- Width overall: 1,835 mm (72.2 in)
- Height overall: 1,195 mm (47.0 in)
- Front track: 1,448 mm (57.0 in)
- Rear track: 1,492 mm (58.7 in)
- Ground clearance: 100 mm (3.9 in)

Performance

- Top speed: 175 or 185+ mph.
- 0 to 62 mph (100 km/h): 4.4 seconds
- 0 to 100 mph (160 km/h): 9.5 seconds

Production numbers

- T350: 390 approx
- T350T: 70 approx

Estimated and very approximate figures as there are no factory records available
