= TVR Sagaris =

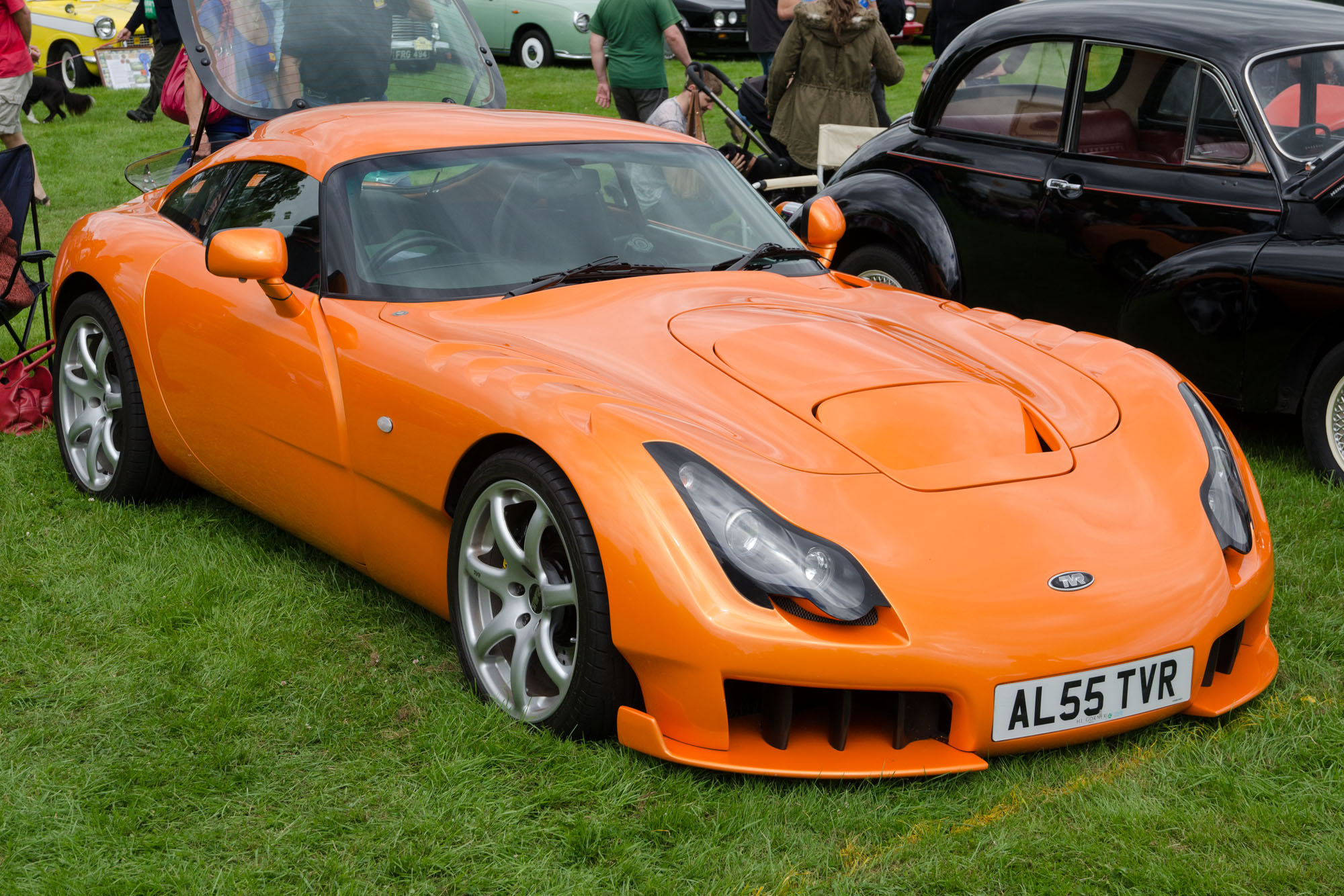

Overview
- Manufacturer: TVR Motor Company Limited
- Production: 2005–2006; 213 produced
- Assembly: United Kingdom: Blackpool, England
- Designer: Graham Browne, Lee Hodgetts, Darren Hobbs, Martin Smith

Body and chassis
- Class: Sports car (S)
- Body style: 2-door coupe
- Layout: Longitudinal-mounted, front mid-engine, rear-wheel drive
- Platform: Fibreglass body over tubular steel chassis
- Related: TVR T350

Powertrain
- Engine: 4.0 L (3,996 cc) Speed Six I6
- Power output: 406 bhp (412 PS; 303 kW) and 349 lb⋅ft (473 N⋅m) of torque
- Transmission: 5-speed manual

Dimensions
- Wheelbase: 92.9 in (2,360 mm)
- Length: 159.7 in (4,056 mm)
- Width: 72.8 in (1,849 mm)
- Height: 46.3 in (1,176 mm)
- Kerb weight: 2,376 lb (1,078 kg)

The TVR Sagaris is a sports car designed and built by the British company TVR from 2005 to 2006, in their factory in Blackpool, Lancashire.

== Overview ==
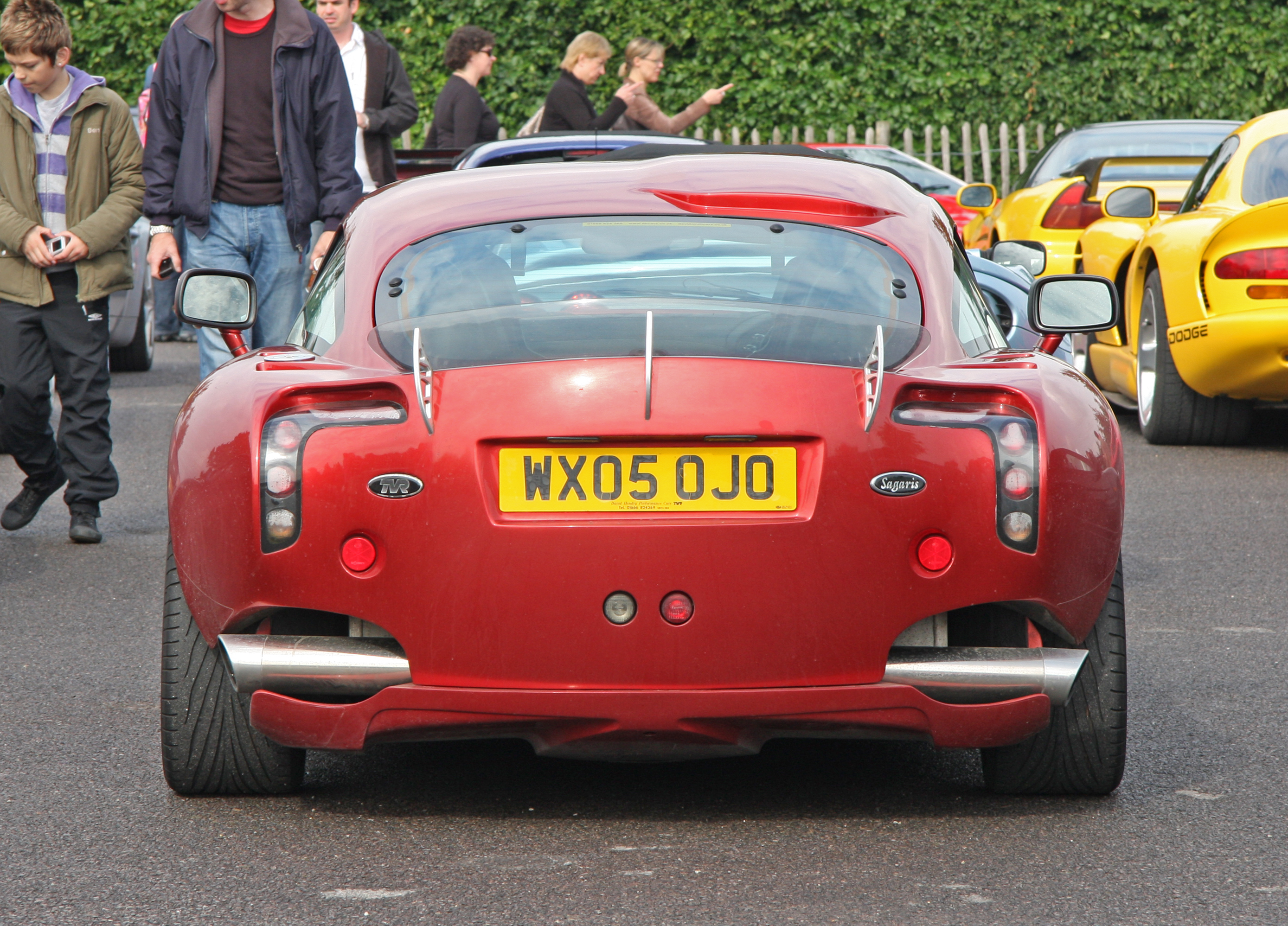
TVR Sagaris rear

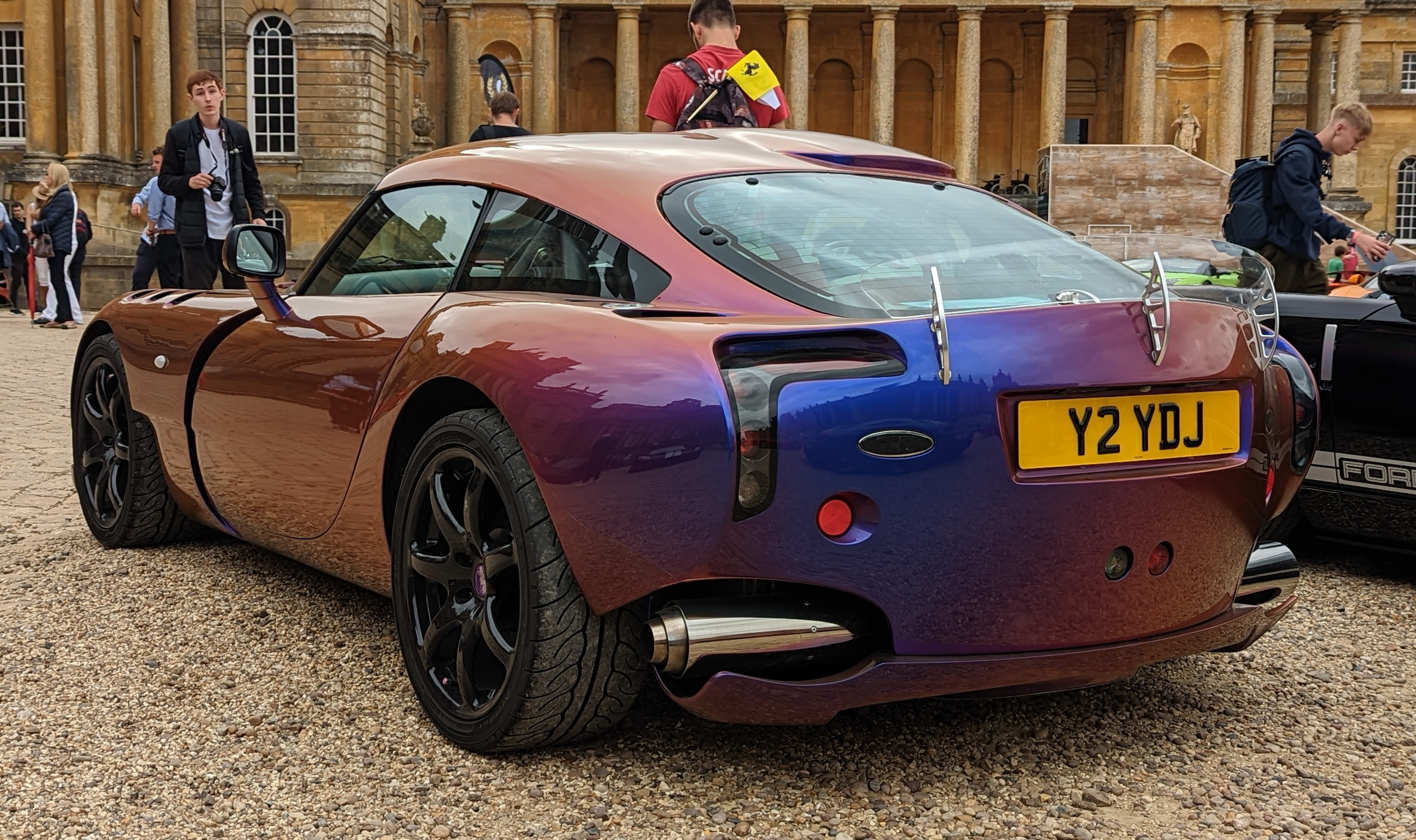
Rear ¾ view

The Sagaris made its debut at the MPH03 Auto Show in 2003. The pre-production model was then shown at the 2004 Birmingham Motor Show. In 2005, the production model was released for public sale at TVR dealerships around the world. Based on the TVR T350, the Sagaris was designed with endurance racing in mind. The multitude of air vents, intake openings, and other features on the bodywork allow the car to be driven for extended periods of time on race tracks with no modifications required for cooling and ventilation. The final production model came with several variations from the pre-production show models, e.g. the vents on the wings are not cut out, different wing mirrors, location of the fuel filler, and bonnet hinges (along with other variations).

As with all TVRs of the 1990s and early 2000s, the Sagaris ignores the European Union guideline that all new cars should be fitted with ABS and at least front airbags, because Peter Wheeler believed that such devices promote overconfidence and risk the life of a driver in the event of a rollover—which TVRs are engineered to resist. It also eschews electronic driver's aids (such as traction control or electronic stability control), leading Malcolm Thorne of Classic & Sports Car magazine to observe that although "far less intimidating than you might expect, in the wet it sends a prickle of trepidation down your spine". Thorne nonetheless summed up the TVR as "stunning".

The car's name comes from the sagaris, the Greek name of a lightweight battle-axe used by the Scythians, which was feared for its ability to penetrate the armour of their enemies. The car was designed by Graham Browne.

Daniel Boardman, the Chief Engineer involved in the Sagaris project, was frustrated with well-known TVR quality issues, such as water ingress, carpets coming unstuck, and tricky handling. Boardman spent considerable time ensuring the Sagaris was engineered properly from the start. The suspension was designed to eliminate bump-steer, the dampers were tuned with input from the Bilstein and Multimatic, the bonnet was redesigned to work as well as any conventional steel bonnet, and door seals were meticulously checked to ensure no water ingress. Motoring journalist Jeremy Clarkson described the resulting product as "the best TVR ever made".

In 2008, TVR unveiled the Sagaris 2, which was designed to replace the original Sagaris. The prototype had minor changes to the original car, including a revised rear fascia and exhaust system, and modifications to the interior.

A company called Grex Automotive acquired the forms and tools after TVR's bankruptcy. In 2018, they made the TVR Sagaris available to buy as a kit car. Only ten examples were planned, and the engine and transmission choice were up to the buyers.

== Specifications ==
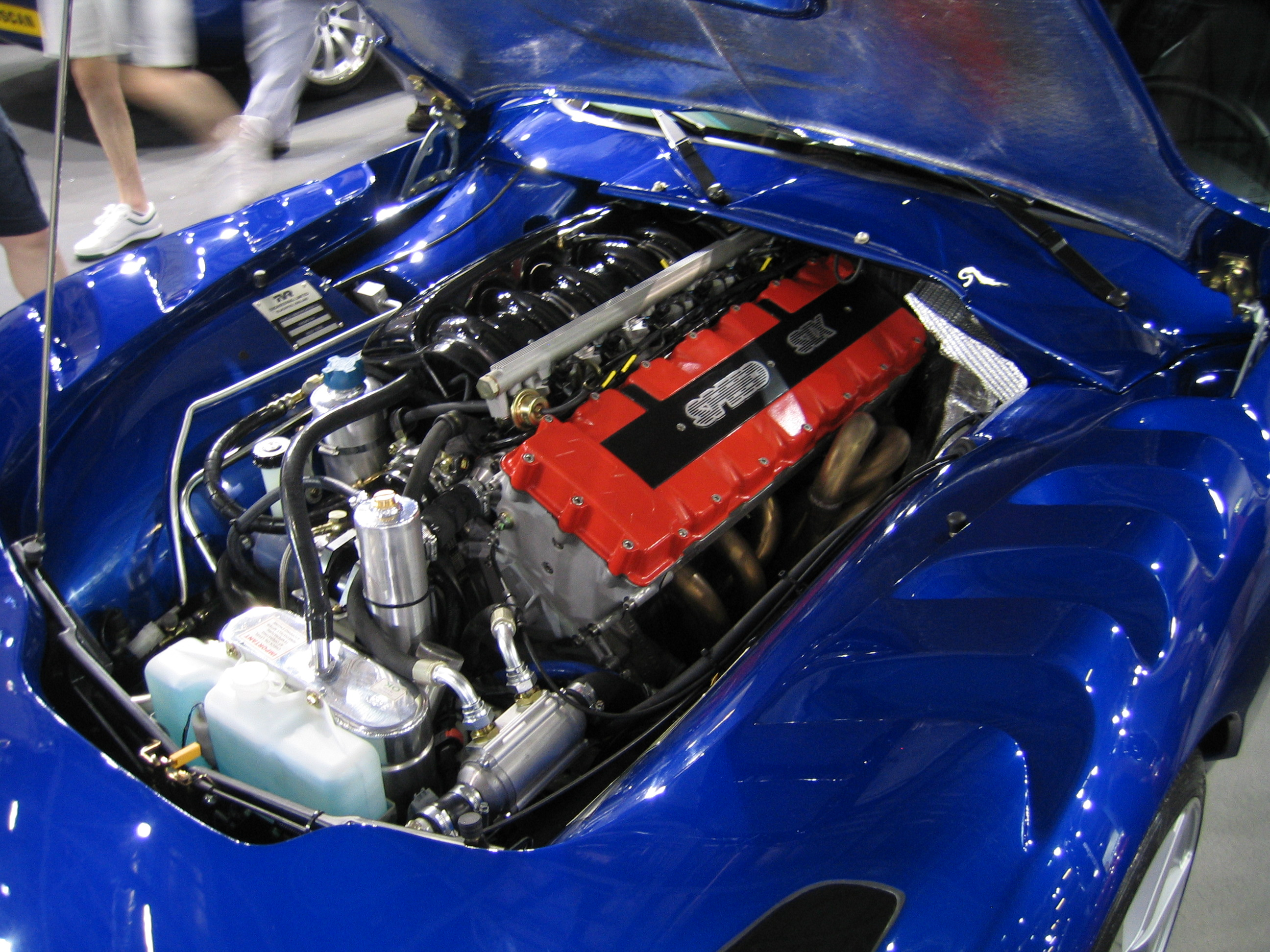
Engine

Powerplant

- Engine type: Sagaris TVR Speed Six engine
- Displacement: 3,996 cc (4.0 L; 243.9 cu in)
- Power output: 406 bhp (303 kW; 412 PS) at 7000 rpm
- Torque output: 349 lb⋅ft (473 N⋅m) at 5000 rpm
- Bore x stroke: 96 mm × 92 mm (3.78 in × 3.62 in)
- Compression ratio: 12.2:1
- Valvetrain setup: DOHC 4 valves per cylinder
- Camshaft duration: inlet 264, exhaust 264 standard

Gearbox

- Transmission: 5-speed manual

Suspension

- Front: Independent, double wishbones, coil-over gas dampers, sway bars
- Rear: Independent, double wishbones, coil-over gas dampers, sway bars

Brakes

- Front: 322 mm (12.7 in) ventilated disc brakes
- Rear: 298 mm (11.7 in) ventilated disc brakes

Wheels and tires

- Wheels: 18 x 8.5 in aluminium alloy Spider wheels
- Tires: 255/35

Chassis/body

- Body panels: glass reinforced plastic
- Weight: 2,371 lb (1,075 kg)
- Length: 4,057 mm (159.7 in)
- Width: 1,770 mm (69.7 in)
- Height: 1,175 mm (46.3 in)

Performance

- Top speed: 185 mph (298 km/h)
- 0 to 60 mph (97 km/h): 3.7 seconds
- 60 to 0 mph: 2.9 seconds

== Racing ==
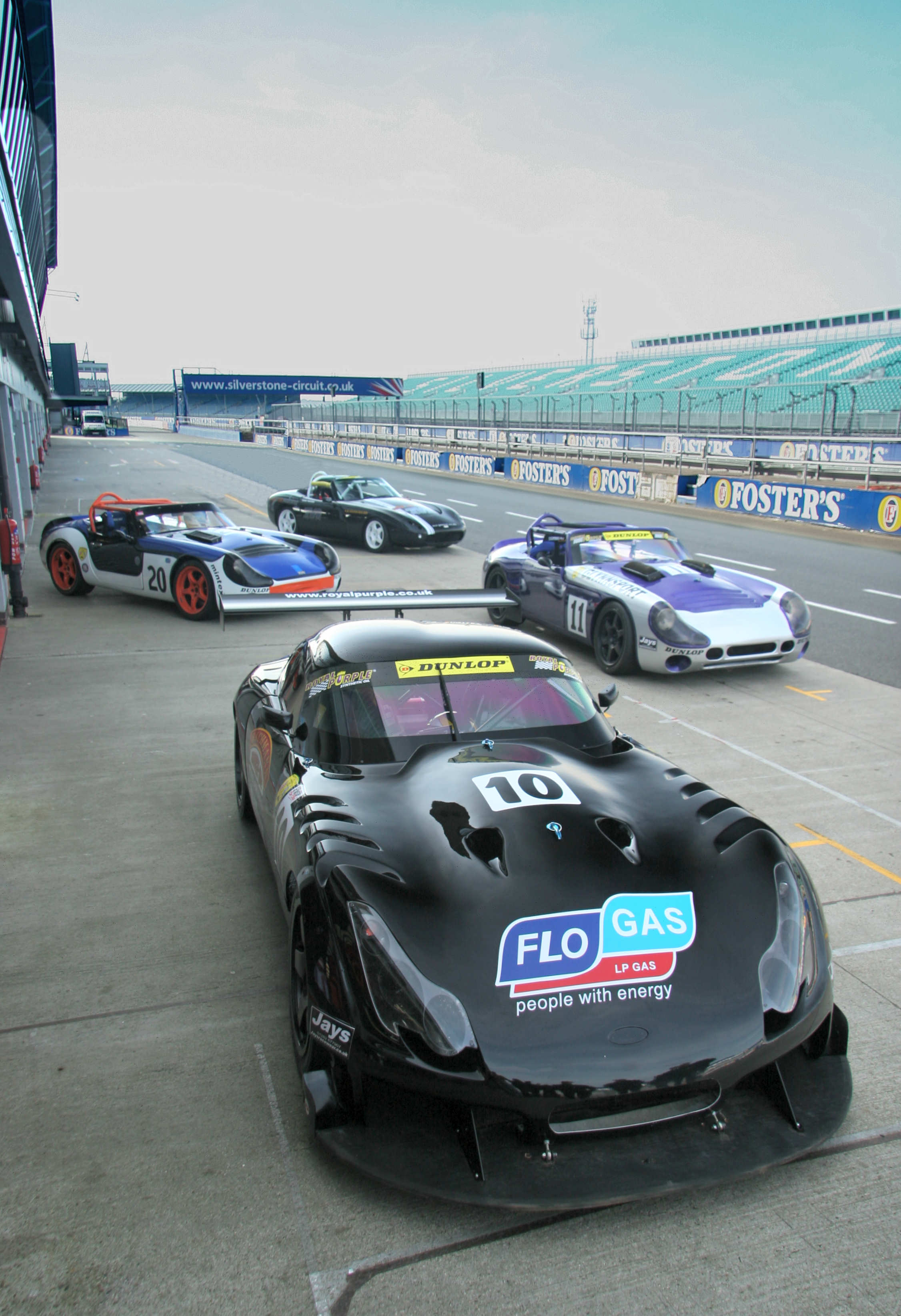
TVR Sagaris GTF01 launch at Silverstone 2006. GTF built 4 cars at the factory and with factory race shells. They also supply kits for teams to build to their Championships specification. This includes the Racesport cars.

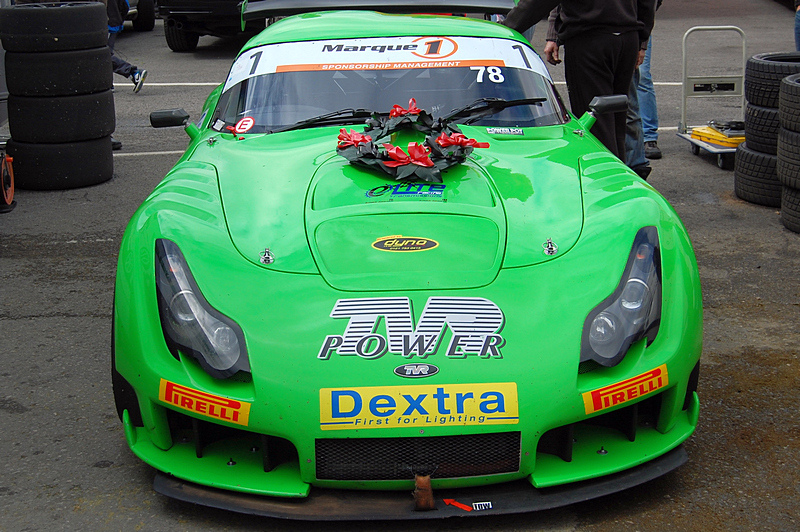
Racing TVR Sagaris Supersport after winning in the GT Cup Series at Oulton Park, UK

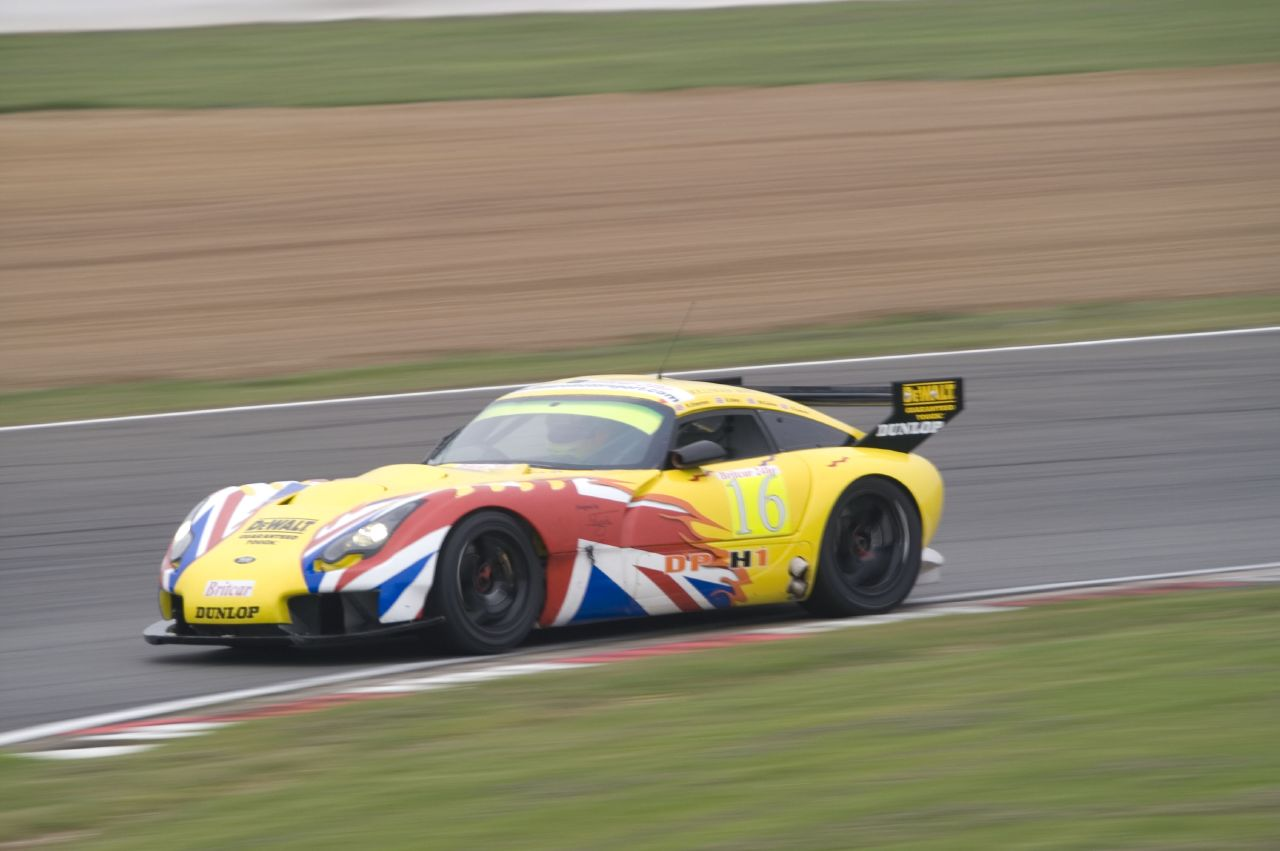
TVR Sagaris (race spec)

A TVR Sagaris was entered in the 2011 British GT Cup by Team Winstanley, driven by Danny Winstanley. The car entered had a standard factory chassis, but was fitted with an upgraded 420 hp (426 PS; 313 kW) TVR Supersport Speed Six engine. In its first season it achieved two wins at Oulton Park and Brands Hatch.

GTF Sagaris cars have won in the TVR Challenge (every race entered), GT Cup, Britcar and the Ardennes Challenge at Spa, as well as many club sport races. The GTF02 remains the most successful car with over 40 race wins and 3 Championship outright wins.
