= Alexander Frei (racing driver) =

Swiss racing driver (born 1954)

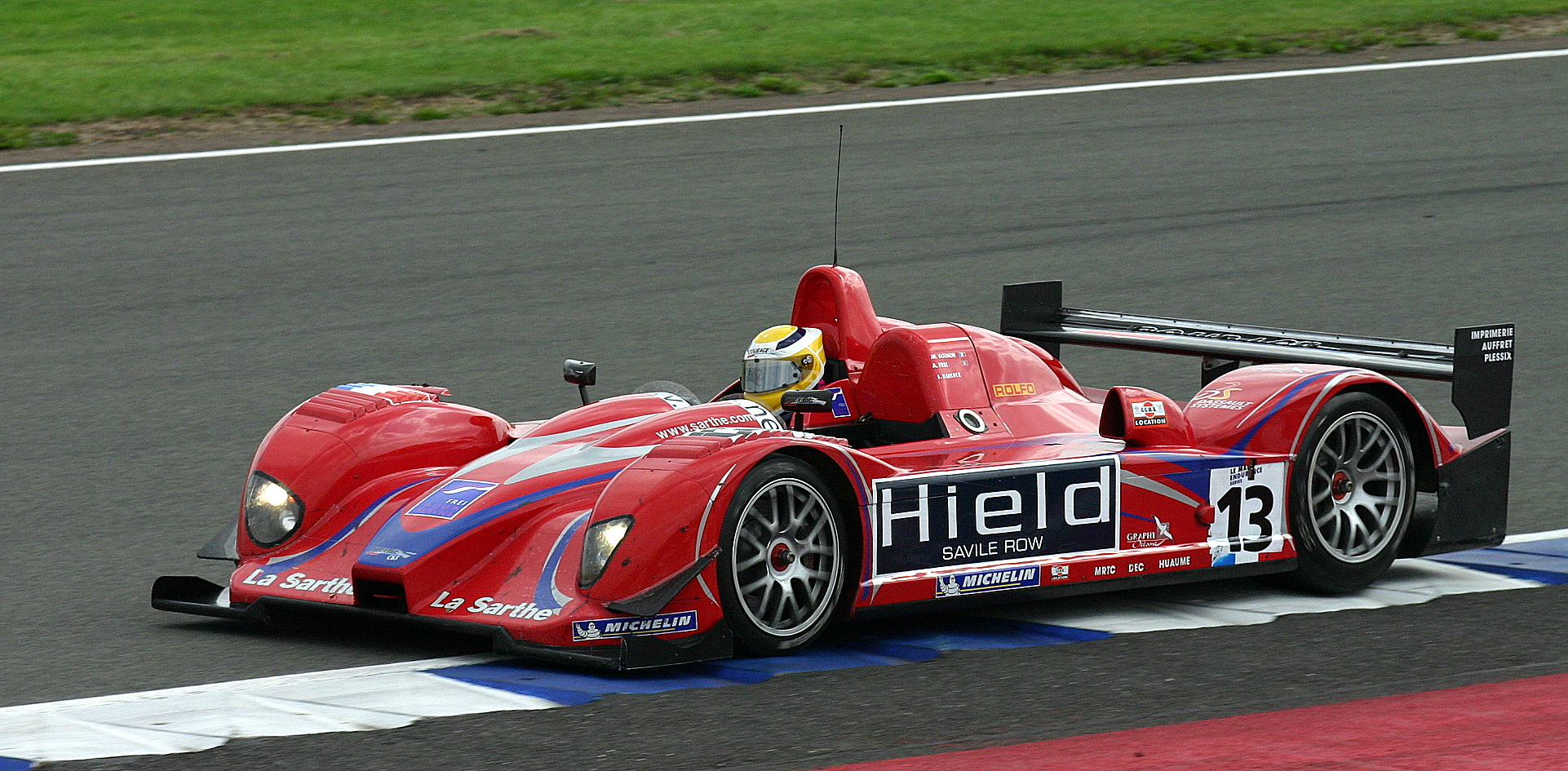
- Frei in 2004
- Nationality: (Switzerland) Swiss
- Born: June 20, 1954 (age 72) Solothurn, Switzerland

Le Mans Series career
- Years active: 2004–2007
- Teams: Courage Compétition
- Starts: 17
- Wins: 3
- Podiums: 3
- Poles: 1
- Fastest laps: 2
- Best finish: 1st in 2004 (LMP2)

Championship titles
- 2004: Le Mans Endurance Series – LMP2

Alexander Frei (born June 20, 1954) is a Swiss former racing driver who last competed for Autovitesse in the Lamborghini Super Trofeo Europe.

In 2004, Frei, along with his teammate Sam Hancock, won the inaugural LMP2 class championship in the Le Mans Endurance Series.

== Racing record ==
=== Career summary ===
Season	Series	Team	Races	Wins	Poles	F/Laps	Podiums	Points	Position
2003	French GT Championship	Autovitesse	12	0	0	0	0	64	24th
2004	Le Mans Endurance Series – LMP2	Courage Compétition	3	3	0	0	3	30	**1st**
2004	24 Hours of Le Mans – LMP2	Courage Compétition	1	0	0	0	0	N/A	DNF
2005	Le Mans Endurance Series – LMP1	Courage Compétition	5	0	0	0	0	11	11th
2005	24 Hours of Le Mans – LMP1	Courage Compétition	1	0	0	0	0	N/A	6th
2006	Le Mans Series – LMP1	Courage Compétition	4	0	1	2	0	7	12th
2006	24 Hours of Le Mans – LMP1	Courage Compétition	1	0	0	0	0	N/A	DNF
2006	FIA GT3 European Championship	Reiter Engineering	2	0	0	0	0	0	NC
2007	Le Mans Series – LMP1	Courage Compétition	5	0	0	?	0	5	18th
2007	24 Hours of Le Mans – LMP1	Courage Compétition	1	0	0	0	0	N/A	9th
2009	FIA GT3 European Championship	Reiter Engineering	7	0	0	0	0	0	NC
2009	Lamborghini Super Trofeo Europe – Pro-Am	Autovitesse	12	1	?	?	4	73	5th

=== Complete Le Mans Series results ===
(key) (Races in bold indicate pole position; results in italics indicate fastest lap)

Year	Entrant	Class	Chassis	Engine	1	2	3	4	5	6	Rank	Points
2004	Courage Compétition	LMP2	Courage C65	MG (AER) XP20 2.0 L Turbo I4	MNZ	NÜR; 1	SIL; 1	SPA; 1			1st	30
2005	Courage Compétition	LMP1	Pescarolo C60 Hybrid	Judd GV4 4.0 L V10	SPA; Ret	MNZ; 4	SIL; 6	NÜR; 7	IST; 8		11th	11
2006	Courage Compétition	LMP1	Courage LC70	Mugen MF458S 4.5 L V8	IST	SPA; NC	NÜR; 7	**DON**; 4	JAR; Ret		12th	7
2007	Courage Compétition	LMP1	Courage LC70	AER P32T 3.6 L Turbo V8	MON; 7	VAL; Ret	NÜR; 11	SPA; Ret	SIL; 6	INT	18th	5

=== Complete 24 Hours of Le Mans results ===
Year	Team	Co-Drivers	Car	Class	Laps	Pos.	Class Pos.
2004	(France) Courage Compétition	(United Kingdom) Sam Hancock (France) Jean-Marc Gounon	Courage C65-JPX	LMP2	127	DNF	DNF
2005	(France) Courage Compétition	(Germany) Dominik Schwager (United Kingdom) Christian Vann	Pescarolo C60 Hybrid-Judd	LMP1	224	8th	6th
2006	(France) Courage Compétition	(United Kingdom) Gregor Fisken (United Kingdom) Sam Hancock	Courage LC70-Mugen	LMP1	171	DNF	DNF
2007	(France) Courage Compétition	(France) Bruno Besson (France) Jonathan Cochet	Courage LC70-AER	LMP1	304	26th	9th
