= 2004 Le Mans Endurance Series =

Motorsport series

Seasons
- ← none 2005 →

The 2004 Le Mans Endurance Series was the inaugural season of ACO's Le Mans Endurance Series. It is a series for Le Mans prototype and Grand Touring style cars broken into 4 classes: LMP1, LMP2, GTS, and GT. It began on 9 May 2004 and ended on 13 November 2004 after 4 rounds.

This season was preceded by the 1000km of Le Mans held in 2003 as a development race for the creation of the LMES.

== Schedule ==
Rnd	Race	Circuit	Date
-	(France) LMES Official Test	Paul Ricard HTTT	10 April; 11 April
1	(Italy) 1000km of Monza	Autodromo Nazionale di Monza	9 May
2	(Germany) 1000km of Nürburgring	Nürburgring	3 July
3	(United Kingdom) 1000km of Silverstone	Silverstone Circuit	13 August
4	(Belgium) 1000km of Spa	Circuit de Spa-Francorchamps	12 September

== Entry list ==
Entry List
Entrant/Team	Car	Engine	Tyre	No	Drivers	Rounds
LMP1
(United Kingdom) Creation Autosportif	DBA 03S	Zytek ZG348 3.4 L V8	D	3	(France) Nicolas Minassian	All
(United Kingdom) Creation Autosportif	DBA 03S	Zytek ZG348 3.4 L V8	D	3	(United Kingdom) Jamie Campbell-Walter	All
(United Kingdom) Taurus Sports	Lola B2K/10	Judd GV4 4.0 L V10	D	4	(United Kingdom) Christian Vann	1
(United Kingdom) Taurus Sports	Lola B2K/10	Judd GV4 4.0 L V10	D	4	(Switzerland) Benjamin Leuenberger	1
(United Kingdom) Taurus Sports	Lola B2K/10	Judd GV4 4.0 L V10	D	4	(Germany) Alex Müller	1
(United Kingdom) Taurus Sports	Lola B2K/10	Caterpillar TDI 4.9 L Turbo V10 (Diesel)	D	10	(United Kingdom) Calum Lockie	1, 3
(United Kingdom) Taurus Sports	Lola B2K/10	Caterpillar TDI 4.9 L Turbo V10 (Diesel)	D	10	(United Kingdom) Phil Andrews	1, 3
(United Kingdom) Taurus Sports	Lola B2K/10	Caterpillar TDI 4.9 L Turbo V10 (Diesel)	D	10	(United Kingdom) Richard Jones	3
(Japan) Team Goh	Audi R8	Audi 3.6 L Turbo V8	M	5	(Italy) Rinaldo Capello	All
(Japan) Team Goh	Audi R8	Audi 3.6 L Turbo V8	M	5	(Japan) Seiji Ara	All
(Japan) Team Goh	Audi R8	Audi 3.6 L Turbo V8	M	5	(Denmark) Tom Kristensen	1
(United Kingdom) Rollcentre Racing	Dallara SP1	Judd GV4 4.0 L V10	D	6	(United Kingdom) Martin Short	All
(United Kingdom) Rollcentre Racing	Dallara SP1	Judd GV4 4.0 L V10	D	6	(Portugal) João Barbosa	All
(United Kingdom) Rollcentre Racing	Dallara SP1	Judd GV4 4.0 L V10	D	6	(United Kingdom) Rob Barff	1
(United Kingdom) Rollcentre Racing	Dallara SP1	Judd GV4 4.0 L V10	D	6	(United Kingdom) Patrick Pearce	2–4
(United Kingdom) RML	MG-Lola EX257	MG (AER) XP20 2.0 L Turbo I4	D	7	(United Kingdom) Mike Newton	All
(United Kingdom) RML	MG-Lola EX257	MG (AER) XP20 2.0 L Turbo I4	D	7	(Brazil) Thomas Erdos	All
(United Kingdom) RML	MG-Lola EX257	MG (AER) XP20 2.0 L Turbo I4	D	7	(Portugal) Miguel Ramos	All
(United Kingdom) Audi Sport UK Team Veloqx	Audi R8	Audi 3.6 L Turbo V8	M	8	(United Kingdom) Allan McNish	All
(United Kingdom) Audi Sport UK Team Veloqx	Audi R8	Audi 3.6 L Turbo V8	M	8	(Germany) Pierre Kaffer	All
(United Kingdom) Audi Sport UK Team Veloqx	Audi R8	Audi 3.6 L Turbo V8	M	88	(United Kingdom) Johnny Herbert	All
(United Kingdom) Audi Sport UK Team Veloqx	Audi R8	Audi 3.6 L Turbo V8	M	88	(United Kingdom) Jamie Davies	All
(Japan) Advan Kondo Racing	Dome S101	Mugen MF408S 4.0 L V8	Y	9	(Japan) Hiroki Katoh	1
(Japan) Advan Kondo Racing	Dome S101	Mugen MF408S 4.0 L V8	Y	9	(Japan) Ryo Michigami	1
(France) Larbre Compétition	Panoz GTP	Ford Élan 6L8 6.0 L V8	M	11	(France) Olivier Dupard	4
(France) Larbre Compétition	Panoz GTP	Ford Élan 6L8 6.0 L V8	M	11	(France) Sébastien Dumez	4
(France) Larbre Compétition	Panoz GTP	Ford Élan 6L8 6.0 L V8	M	11	(France) Jean-Luc Blanchemain	4
(United Kingdom) Team Nasamax	Nasamax DM139 (Reynard)	Judd GV5 5.0 L V10 (Bio-ethanol)	D M	14	(Canada) Robbie Stirling	1, 3–4
(United Kingdom) Team Nasamax	Nasamax DM139 (Reynard)	Judd GV5 5.0 L V10 (Bio-ethanol)	D M	14	(South Africa) Werner Lupberger	1, 3–4
(United Kingdom) Team Nasamax	Nasamax DM139 (Reynard)	Judd GV5 5.0 L V10 (Bio-ethanol)	D M	14	(France) Romain Dumas	3–4
(France) Pescarolo Sport	Pescarolo C60	Judd GV5 5.0 L V10	M	17	(France) Soheil Ayari	1–2, 4
(France) Pescarolo Sport	Pescarolo C60	Judd GV5 5.0 L V10	M	17	(France) Emmanuel Collard	1
(France) Pescarolo Sport	Pescarolo C60	Judd GV5 5.0 L V10	M	17	(France) Éric Hélary	2
(France) Pescarolo Sport	Pescarolo C60	Judd GV5 5.0 L V10	M	17	(France) Jean-Marc Gounon	4
(United Kingdom) Lister Cars (United Kingdom) Lister Racing	Lister Storm LMP	Chevrolet LS1 6.0 L V8	D	20	(United Kingdom) Justin Keen	2–4
(United Kingdom) Lister Cars (United Kingdom) Lister Racing	Lister Storm LMP	Chevrolet LS1 6.0 L V8	D	20	(Denmark) John Nielsen	2
(United Kingdom) Lister Cars (United Kingdom) Lister Racing	Lister Storm LMP	Chevrolet LS1 6.0 L V8	D	20	(United Kingdom) Rob Barff	3
(United Kingdom) Lister Cars (United Kingdom) Lister Racing	Lister Storm LMP	Chevrolet LS1 6.0 L V8	D	20	(Belgium) Marc Goossens	4
(United Kingdom) Zytek Engineering	Zytek 04S	Zytek ZG348 3.4 L V8	M	22	(United Kingdom) Andy Wallace	1
(United Kingdom) Zytek Engineering	Zytek 04S	Zytek ZG348 3.4 L V8	M	22	(Australia) David Brabham	1
(United Kingdom) Zytek Engineering	Zytek 04S	Zytek ZG348 3.4 L V8	M	22	(Sweden) Stefan Johansson	1
(United Kingdom) Zytek Engineering	Zytek 04S	Zytek ZG348 3.4 L V8	M	22	(United Kingdom) Robbie Kerr	3
(United Kingdom) Zytek Engineering	Zytek 04S	Zytek ZG348 3.4 L V8	M	22	(United States) Chris Dyson	3
(Italy) Spinnaker Clandesteam	Dallara SP1	Judd GV4 4.0 L V10	M	24	(Italy) Rocky Agusta	1
(Italy) Spinnaker Clandesteam	Dallara SP1	Judd GV4 4.0 L V10	M	24	(Bolivia) Felipe Ortiz	1
(Italy) Spinnaker Clandesteam	Dallara SP1	Judd GV4 4.0 L V10	M	24	(Italy) Beppe Gabbiani	1
(United Kingdom) Team Jota	Zytek 04S	Zytek ZG348 3.4 L V8	D	69	(United Kingdom) John Stack	All
(United Kingdom) Team Jota	Zytek 04S	Zytek ZG348 3.4 L V8	D	69	(United Kingdom) Sam Hignett	All
(United Kingdom) Team Jota	Zytek 04S	Zytek ZG348 3.4 L V8	D	69	(Italy) Gianni Collini	All
LMP2
(France) Courage Compétition	Courage C65	MG (AER) XP20 2.0 L Turbo I4	M	13	(Switzerland) Alexander Frei	2–4
(France) Courage Compétition	Courage C65	MG (AER) XP20 2.0 L Turbo I4	M	13	(United Kingdom) Sam Hancock	2–4
(France) Courage Compétition	Courage C65	MG (AER) XP20 2.0 L Turbo I4	M	13	(France) Jean-Marc Gounon	2–3
(France) Courage Compétition	Courage C65	MG (AER) XP20 2.0 L Turbo I4	M	13	(France) Jonathan Cochet	4
(France) Paul Belmondo Racing	Courage C65	MG (AER) XP20 2.0 L Turbo I4	M	26	(France) Paul Belmondo	All
(France) Paul Belmondo Racing	Courage C65	MG (AER) XP20 2.0 L Turbo I4	M	26	(France) Claude-Yves Gosselin	All
(France) Paul Belmondo Racing	Courage C65	MG (AER) XP20 2.0 L Turbo I4	M	26	(France) Marco Saviozzi	1–3
(France) Paul Belmondo Racing	Courage C65	MG (AER) XP20 2.0 L Turbo I4	M	26	(Belgium) Wim Eyckmans	4
(United Kingdom) Tracsport	Lola B2K/40	Nissan (AER) VQL 3.0 L V6	D	27	(United Kingdom) John Ingram	2–4
(United Kingdom) Tracsport	Lola B2K/40	Nissan (AER) VQL 3.0 L V6	D	27	(United Kingdom) John Gaw	2–4
(United Kingdom) Tracsport	Lola B2K/40	Nissan (AER) VQL 3.0 L V6	D	27	(United Kingdom) Rick Pearson	2–4
(Italy) Team Ranieri Randaccio	Tampolli RTA99	Ford Nicholson-McLaren XB 3.3 L V8	G	28	(Italy) Ranieri Randaccio	1–3
(Italy) Team Ranieri Randaccio	Tampolli RTA99	Ford Nicholson-McLaren XB 3.3 L V8	G	28	(Italy) Leonardo Maddalena	1–2
(Italy) Team Ranieri Randaccio	Tampolli RTA99	Ford Nicholson-McLaren XB 3.3 L V8	G	28	(Italy) Fabio Mancini	3
(Switzerland) Équipe Palmyr	Lucchini SR2000	Alfa Romeo 3.0 L V6	A D	31	(Switzerland) Christophe Ricard	2–4
(Switzerland) Équipe Palmyr	Lucchini SR2000	Alfa Romeo 3.0 L V6	A D	31	(Switzerland) Philippe Favre	2–4
(Switzerland) Équipe Palmyr	Lucchini SR2000	Alfa Romeo 3.0 L V6	A D	31	(France) Grégory Fargier	2–4
(United States) Intersport Racing	Lola B2K/40	Judd KV675 3.4 L V8	P	32	(United States) Clint Field	1
(United States) Intersport Racing	Lola B2K/40	Judd KV675 3.4 L V8	P	32	(United States) Jon Field	1
(United States) Intersport Racing	Lola B2K/40	Judd KV675 3.4 L V8	P	32	(United States) William Binnie	1
(Italy) Lucchini Engineering	Lucchini LMP2/04	Judd KV675 3.4 L V8	P	32	(Italy) Piergiuseppe Peroni	4
(Italy) Lucchini Engineering	Lucchini LMP2/04	Judd KV675 3.4 L V8	P	32	(Italy) Mirko Savoldi	4
(Italy) Lucchini Engineering	Lucchini LMP2/04	Judd KV675 3.4 L V8	P	32	(Italy) Filippo Francioni	4
(Austria) Renauer Motorsport	Tampolli RTA99	Alfa Romeo 3.0L V6	D	33	(Austria) Manfred Jurasz	2
(Austria) Renauer Motorsport	Tampolli RTA99	Alfa Romeo 3.0L V6	D	33	(Austria) Hannes Gsell	2
(Austria) Renauer Motorsport	Tampolli RTA99	Alfa Romeo 3.0L V6	D	33	(Czech Republic) Petr Válek	2
(United Kingdom) K2 Race Engineering	Pilbeam MP91	Judd KV675 3.4 L V8	?	34	(United Kingdom) Simon Pullan	3
(United Kingdom) K2 Race Engineering	Pilbeam MP91	Judd KV675 3.4 L V8	?	34	(United Kingdom) Peter Owen	3
(United Kingdom) K2 Race Engineering	Pilbeam MP91	Judd KV675 3.4 L V8	?	34	(United Kingdom) Ben Devlin	3
(Belgium) G-Force Racing	Pilbeam MP84	Nissan (AER) VQL 3.0 L V6	D	35	(Belgium) Franck Hahn	2–4
(Belgium) G-Force Racing	Pilbeam MP84	Nissan (AER) VQL 3.0 L V6	D	35	(France) Jean-François Leroch	2–3
(Belgium) G-Force Racing	Pilbeam MP84	Nissan (AER) VQL 3.0 L V6	D	35	(France) Philippe Haezebrouck	2, 4
(Belgium) G-Force Racing	Pilbeam MP84	Nissan (AER) VQL 3.0 L V6	D	35	(United Kingdom) Tim Greaves	3
(Belgium) G-Force Racing	Pilbeam MP84	Nissan (AER) VQL 3.0 L V6	D	35	(Belgium) Sylvie Delcour	4
(France) Gerard Welter (France) Welter Racing	WR LMP2	Peugeot ES9 3.4 L V6	M	36	(France) Jean-René de Fournoux	2–4
(France) Gerard Welter (France) Welter Racing	WR LMP2	Peugeot ES9 3.4 L V6	M	36	(France) Jean-Bernard Bouvet	2–4
(France) Gerard Welter (France) Welter Racing	WR LMP2	Peugeot ES9 3.4 L V6	M	36	(France) Sylvain Boulay	4
(France) Pierre Bruneau (France) PiR Compétition	Pilbeam MP91	JPX (Mader) 3.4 L V6	M	99	(France) Pierre Bruneau	All
(France) Pierre Bruneau (France) PiR Compétition	Pilbeam MP91	JPX (Mader) 3.4 L V6	M	99	(France) Marc Rostan	All
GTS
(Germany) A-Level Engineering	Porsche 911 Bi-Turbo	Porsche 3.6 L Turbo Flat-6	M	50	(Germany) Wolfgang Kaufmann	2–3
(Germany) A-Level Engineering	Porsche 911 Bi-Turbo	Porsche 3.6 L Turbo Flat-6	M	50	(Belgium) Eric van de Poele	2–3
(Italy) MAC Racing (Italy) Scuderia Veregra	Chrysler Viper GTS-R	Chrysler EWB 8.0 L V10	P G	51	(Italy) Maurizio Strada	1–2
(Italy) MAC Racing (Italy) Scuderia Veregra	Chrysler Viper GTS-R	Chrysler EWB 8.0 L V10	P G	51	(Italy) Massimo Morini	1–2
(Italy) MAC Racing (Italy) Scuderia Veregra	Chrysler Viper GTS-R	Chrysler EWB 8.0 L V10	P G	51	(Italy) "Base Up"	1–2
(United Kingdom) Graham Nash Motorsport	Saleen S7-R	Ford Windsor 7.0 L V8	D	52	(Italy) Gian Maria Gabbiani	1–2
(United Kingdom) Graham Nash Motorsport	Saleen S7-R	Ford Windsor 7.0 L V8	D	52	(Italy) Ettore Bonaldi	1
(United Kingdom) Graham Nash Motorsport	Saleen S7-R	Ford Windsor 7.0 L V8	D	52	(France) Michel Orts	1
(United Kingdom) Graham Nash Motorsport	Saleen S7-R	Ford Windsor 7.0 L V8	D	52	(United Kingdom) Phillip Bennett	2–4
(United Kingdom) Graham Nash Motorsport	Saleen S7-R	Ford Windsor 7.0 L V8	D	52	(United Kingdom) David Leslie	3–4
(United Kingdom) Graham Nash Motorsport	Saleen S7-R	Ford Windsor 7.0 L V8	D	52	(United Kingdom) Paul Whight	3–4
(Germany) Konrad Motorsport (Germany) Vitaphone Racing	Saleen S7-R	Ford Windsor 7.0 L V8	P	53	(Germany) Klaus Abbelen	2
(Germany) Konrad Motorsport (Germany) Vitaphone Racing	Saleen S7-R	Ford Windsor 7.0 L V8	P	53	(Poland) Maciej Stanco	2
(Germany) Konrad Motorsport (Germany) Vitaphone Racing	Saleen S7-R	Ford Windsor 7.0 L V8	P	53	(United Kingdom) Paul Knapfield	2
(Germany) Konrad Motorsport (Germany) Vitaphone Racing	Saleen S7-R	Ford Windsor 7.0 L V8	P	59	(Germany) Uwe Alzen	All
(Germany) Konrad Motorsport (Germany) Vitaphone Racing	Saleen S7-R	Ford Windsor 7.0 L V8	P	59	(Germany) Michael Bartels	All
(Germany) Konrad Motorsport (Germany) Vitaphone Racing	Saleen S7-R	Ford Windsor 7.0 L V8	P	59	(Austria) Franz Konrad	All
(France) Force One Racing	Chrysler Viper GTS-R	Chrysler EWB 8.0 L V10	P	60	(France) David Hallyday	1–2
(France) Force One Racing	Chrysler Viper GTS-R	Chrysler EWB 8.0 L V10	P	60	(France) Bruno Besson	1–2
(France) Force One Racing	Chrysler Viper GTS-R	Chrysler EWB 8.0 L V10	P	60	(Belgium) Anthony Kumpen	2
(Netherlands) Barron Connor Racing	Ferrari 575-GTC Maranello	Ferrari F133 GT 6.0 L V12	P	61	(Italy) Thomas Biagi	All
(Netherlands) Barron Connor Racing	Ferrari 575-GTC Maranello	Ferrari F133 GT 6.0 L V12	P	61	(United States) Danny Sullivan	All
(Netherlands) Barron Connor Racing	Ferrari 575-GTC Maranello	Ferrari F133 GT 6.0 L V12	P	61	(Netherlands) John Bosch	All
(Netherlands) Barron Connor Racing	Ferrari 575-GTC Maranello	Ferrari F133 GT 6.0 L V12	P	62	(Netherlands) Mike Hezemans	All
(Netherlands) Barron Connor Racing	Ferrari 575-GTC Maranello	Ferrari F133 GT 6.0 L V12	P	62	(Switzerland) Jean-Denis Délétraz	All
(Netherlands) Barron Connor Racing	Ferrari 575-GTC Maranello	Ferrari F133 GT 6.0 L V12	P	62	(France) Ange Barde	1
(Netherlands) Barron Connor Racing	Ferrari 575-GTC Maranello	Ferrari F133 GT 6.0 L V12	P	62	(Italy) Andrea Piccini	3
(France) Larbre Compétition	Ferrari 550-GTS Maranello	Ferrari F133 A 6.0 L V12	M	86	(France) Christophe Bouchut	All
(France) Larbre Compétition	Ferrari 550-GTS Maranello	Ferrari F133 A 6.0 L V12	M	86	(Portugal) Pedro Lamy	All
(France) Larbre Compétition	Ferrari 550-GTS Maranello	Ferrari F133 A 6.0 L V12	M	86	(Switzerland) Steve Zacchia	All
(France) Larbre Compétition	Ferrari 550-GTS Maranello	Ferrari F133 A 6.0 L V12	M	87	(Czech Republic) Tomáš Enge	4
(France) Larbre Compétition	Ferrari 550-GTS Maranello	Ferrari F133 A 6.0 L V12	M	87	(Czech Republic) Robert Pergl	4
(France) Larbre Compétition	Ferrari 550-GTS Maranello	Ferrari F133 A 6.0 L V12	M	87	(France) Patrice Goueslard	4
GT
(United Kingdom) RSR Racing	TVR Tuscan T400R	TVR Speed Six 4.0 L I6	D	40	(United Kingdom) Michael Caine	4
(United Kingdom) RSR Racing	TVR Tuscan T400R	TVR Speed Six 4.0 L I6	D	40	(United Kingdom) Nigel Greensall	4
(United Kingdom) RSR Racing	TVR Tuscan T400R	TVR Speed Six 4.0 L I6	D	40	(United Kingdom) Jonathan Coleman	4
(United Kingdom) RSR Racing	TVR Tuscan T400R	TVR Speed Six 4.0 L I6	D	41	(United Kingdom) Jonny Kane	4
(United Kingdom) RSR Racing	TVR Tuscan T400R	TVR Speed Six 4.0 L I6	D	41	(United Kingdom) Warren Hughes	4
(United Kingdom) RSR Racing	TVR Tuscan T400R	TVR Speed Six 4.0 L I6	D	41	(United Kingdom) Lawrence Tomlinson	4
(United Kingdom) RSR Racing	TVR Tuscan T400R	TVR Speed Six 4.0 L I6	D	74	(United Kingdom) Lawrence Tomlinson	3
(United Kingdom) RSR Racing	TVR Tuscan T400R	TVR Speed Six 4.0 L I6	D	74	(United Kingdom) Nigel Greensall	3
(Monaco) JMB Racing	Ferrari 360 Modena GTC	Ferrari F131 3.6 L V8	D	70	(Russia) Roman Rusinov	All
(Monaco) JMB Racing	Ferrari 360 Modena GTC	Ferrari F131 3.6 L V8	D	70	(France) Stéphane Daoudi	1–3
(Monaco) JMB Racing	Ferrari 360 Modena GTC	Ferrari F131 3.6 L V8	D	70	(Brazil) Jaime Melo	1, 4
(Monaco) JMB Racing	Ferrari 360 Modena GTC	Ferrari F131 3.6 L V8	D	70	(Belgium) Bert Longin	4
(United Kingdom) JWR Mike Jordan (United Kingdom) JWR	Porsche 911 GT3-RSR	Porsche M96/79 3.6 L Flat-6	D	71	(United Kingdom) Mike Jordan	2–3
(United Kingdom) JWR Mike Jordan (United Kingdom) JWR	Porsche 911 GT3-RSR	Porsche M96/79 3.6 L Flat-6	D	71	(United Kingdom) Robin Liddell	2
(United Kingdom) JWR Mike Jordan (United Kingdom) JWR	Porsche 911 GT3-RSR	Porsche M96/79 3.6 L Flat-6	D	71	(United Kingdom) Johnny Mowlem	3
(Italy) Autorlando Sport	Porsche 911 GT3-RSR	Porsche M96/79 3.6 L Flat-6	P	75	(United States) Liz Halliday	4
(Italy) Autorlando Sport	Porsche 911 GT3-RSR	Porsche M96/79 3.6 L Flat-6	P	75	(United Kingdom) Piers Masarati	4
(Italy) Autorlando Sport	Porsche 911 GT3-RSR	Porsche M96/79 3.6 L Flat-6	P	76	(Italy) Franco Groppi	1
(Italy) Autorlando Sport	Porsche 911 GT3-RSR	Porsche M96/79 3.6 L Flat-6	P	76	(Italy) Giampaolo Tenchini	1
(Italy) Autorlando Sport	Porsche 911 GT3-RSR	Porsche M96/79 3.6 L Flat-6	P	76	(Switzerland) Joël Camathias	1
(Italy) Autorlando Sport	Porsche 911 GT3-RSR	Porsche M96/79 3.6 L Flat-6	P	76	(United States) Jim Michaelian	4
(Italy) Autorlando Sport	Porsche 911 GT3-RSR	Porsche M96/79 3.6 L Flat-6	P	76	(Italy) Mauro Casadei	4
(Italy) Autorlando Sport	Porsche 911 GT3-RSR	Porsche M96/79 3.6 L Flat-6	P	76	(Switzerland) François Labhardt	4
(Japan) Choro-Q Racing Team	Porsche 911 GT3-RSR	Porsche M96/79 3.6 L Flat-6	Y	77	(Japan) Haruki Kurosawa	All
(Japan) Choro-Q Racing Team	Porsche 911 GT3-RSR	Porsche M96/79 3.6 L Flat-6	Y	77	(Japan) Kazuyuki Nishizawa	All
(Japan) Choro-Q Racing Team	Porsche 911 GT3-RSR	Porsche M96/79 3.6 L Flat-6	Y	77	(Japan) Manabu Orido	1–2
(France) Thierry Perrier (France) Perspective Racing	Porsche 911 GT3-R	Porsche M96/77 3.6 L Flat-6	D	79	(United Kingdom) Ian Khan	1–2, 4
(France) Thierry Perrier (France) Perspective Racing	Porsche 911 GT3-R	Porsche M96/77 3.6 L Flat-6	D	79	(United Kingdom) Nigel Smith	1
(France) Thierry Perrier (France) Perspective Racing	Porsche 911 GT3-R	Porsche M96/77 3.6 L Flat-6	D	79	(Netherlands) Peter Kox	1
(France) Thierry Perrier (France) Perspective Racing	Porsche 911 GT3-R	Porsche M96/77 3.6 L Flat-6	D	79	(Belgium) Michel Heydens	2, 4
(France) Thierry Perrier (France) Perspective Racing	Porsche 911 GT3-R	Porsche M96/77 3.6 L Flat-6	D	79	(United Kingdom) Tim Sugden	4
(United Kingdom) Sebah Automotive	Porsche 911 GT3-R	Porsche M96/77 3.6 L Flat-6	D	80	(United Kingdom) Piers Masarati	1, 3
(United Kingdom) Sebah Automotive	Porsche 911 GT3-R	Porsche M96/77 3.6 L Flat-6	D	80	(United Kingdom) Bart Hayden	1
(United Kingdom) Sebah Automotive	Porsche 911 GT3-R	Porsche M96/77 3.6 L Flat-6	D	80	(France) Xavier Pompidou	2–3
(United Kingdom) Sebah Automotive	Porsche 911 GT3-R	Porsche M96/77 3.6 L Flat-6	D	80	(United Kingdom) Marino Franchitti	2
(United Kingdom) Sebah Automotive	Porsche 911 GT3-R	Porsche M96/77 3.6 L Flat-6	D	80	(Germany) Marc Lieb	4
(United States) The Racer's Group	Porsche 911 GT3-RSR	Porsche M96/79 3.6 L Flat-6	D	81	(United States) Patrick Long	1
(United States) The Racer's Group	Porsche 911 GT3-RSR	Porsche M96/79 3.6 L Flat-6	D	81	(Denmark) Lars-Erik Nielsen	1
(United States) The Racer's Group	Porsche 911 GT3-RSR	Porsche M96/79 3.6 L Flat-6	D	81	(Denmark) Thorkild Thyrring	1
(Germany) Farnbacher Racing	Porsche 911 GT3-RSR	Porsche M96/79 3.6 L Flat-6	D	81	(Denmark) Thorkild Thyrring	2–4
(Germany) Farnbacher Racing	Porsche 911 GT3-RSR	Porsche M96/79 3.6 L Flat-6	D	81	(Denmark) Lars-Erik Nielsen	2–4
(Germany) Farnbacher Racing	Porsche 911 GT3-RSR	Porsche M96/79 3.6 L Flat-6	D	81	(Germany) Mike Rockenfeller	2
(Germany) Farnbacher Racing	Porsche 911 GT3-RSR	Porsche M96/79 3.6 L Flat-6	D	81	(United States) Patrick Long	3–4
(France) Denis Cohignac	Porsche 911 GT3-R	Porsche M96/77 3.6 L Flat-6	D	82	(France) Sylvain Noël	1–2
(France) Denis Cohignac	Porsche 911 GT3-R	Porsche M96/77 3.6 L Flat-6	D	82	(France) Denis Cohignac	1
(France) Denis Cohignac	Porsche 911 GT3-R	Porsche M96/77 3.6 L Flat-6	D	82	(France) Daniel Desbrueres	1
(France) Denis Cohignac	Porsche 911 GT3-R	Porsche M96/77 3.6 L Flat-6	D	82	(France) Thierry Stépec	2
(France) Denis Cohignac	Porsche 911 GT3-R	Porsche M96/77 3.6 L Flat-6	D	82	(France) André-Alain Corbel	2
(Germany) Seikel Motorsport	Porsche 911 GT3-RS	Porsche M96/77 3.6 L Flat-6	Y	83	(Italy) Luca Riccitelli	1
(Germany) Seikel Motorsport	Porsche 911 GT3-RS	Porsche M96/77 3.6 L Flat-6	Y	83	(Italy) Alex Caffi	1
(Germany) Seikel Motorsport	Porsche 911 GT3-RS	Porsche M96/77 3.6 L Flat-6	Y	83	(Italy) Gabrio Rosa	1
(Germany) Seikel Motorsport	Porsche 911 GT3-RS	Porsche M96/77 3.6 L Flat-6	Y	84	(United States) Philip Collin	All
(Germany) Seikel Motorsport	Porsche 911 GT3-RS	Porsche M96/77 3.6 L Flat-6	Y	84	(Canada) Tony Burgess	1, 3–4
(Germany) Seikel Motorsport	Porsche 911 GT3-RS	Porsche M96/77 3.6 L Flat-6	Y	84	(France) Gaël Lesoudier	2–3
(Germany) Seikel Motorsport	Porsche 911 GT3-RS	Porsche M96/77 3.6 L Flat-6	Y	84	(Germany) Arno Klasen	2
(Germany) Seikel Motorsport	Porsche 911 GT3-RS	Porsche M96/77 3.6 L Flat-6	Y	84	(United Kingdom) Graeme Mundy	4
(Germany) Freisinger Motorsport	Porsche 911 GT3-RSR	Porsche M96/79 3.6 L Flat-6	D	85	(Monaco) Stéphane Ortelli	All
(Germany) Freisinger Motorsport	Porsche 911 GT3-RSR	Porsche M96/79 3.6 L Flat-6	D	85	(France) Romain Dumas	1
(Germany) Freisinger Motorsport	Porsche 911 GT3-RSR	Porsche M96/79 3.6 L Flat-6	D	85	(France) Emmanuel Collard	2–4
(Germany) Freisinger Motorsport	Porsche 911 GT3-RSR	Porsche M96/79 3.6 L Flat-6	D	85	(Russia) Alexey Vasilyev	2
(United Kingdom) Chamberlain-Synergy Motorsport	TVR Tuscan T400R	TVR Speed Six 4.0 L I6	D	89	(United Kingdom) Christopher Stockton	1
(United Kingdom) Chamberlain-Synergy Motorsport	TVR Tuscan T400R	TVR Speed Six 4.0 L I6	D	89	(United Kingdom) Bob Berridge	1
(United Kingdom) Chamberlain-Synergy Motorsport	TVR Tuscan T400R	TVR Speed Six 4.0 L I6	D	89	(United Kingdom) Michael Caine	1
(United Kingdom) Chamberlain-Synergy Motorsport	TVR Tuscan T400R	TVR Speed Six 4.0 L I6	D	89	(United Kingdom) Jonny Kane	3
(United Kingdom) Chamberlain-Synergy Motorsport	TVR Tuscan T400R	TVR Speed Six 4.0 L I6	D	89	(United Kingdom) Warren Hughes	3
(Germany) T2M Motorsport	Porsche 911 GT3-RS	Porsche M96/77 3.6 L Flat-6	Y	90	(Belgium) Vanina Ickx	1–2, 4
(Germany) T2M Motorsport	Porsche 911 GT3-RS	Porsche M96/77 3.6 L Flat-6	Y	90	(Germany) Wolfgang Kaufmann	1
(Germany) T2M Motorsport	Porsche 911 GT3-RS	Porsche M96/77 3.6 L Flat-6	Y	90	(Japan) Keiko Ihara	1
(Germany) T2M Motorsport	Porsche 911 GT3-RS	Porsche M96/77 3.6 L Flat-6	Y	90	(France) Thierry Rabineau	2, 4
(Germany) T2M Motorsport	Porsche 911 GT3-RS	Porsche M96/77 3.6 L Flat-6	Y	90	(United Kingdom) Paul Daniels	2
(Germany) T2M Motorsport	Porsche 911 GT3-RS	Porsche M96/77 3.6 L Flat-6	Y	90	(United Kingdom) Robin Liddell	3
(Germany) T2M Motorsport	Porsche 911 GT3-RS	Porsche M96/77 3.6 L Flat-6	Y	90	(France) Gilles Vannelet	3
(Germany) T2M Motorsport	Porsche 911 GT3-RS	Porsche M96/77 3.6 L Flat-6	Y	90	(Japan) Yukihiro Hane	3
(Germany) T2M Motorsport	Porsche 911 GT3-RS	Porsche M96/77 3.6 L Flat-6	Y	90	(France) Christophe Tinseau	4
(United Kingdom) Racesport Salisbury	TVR Tuscan T400R	TVR Speed Six 4.0 L I6	D	91	(United Kingdom) John Hartshorne	All
(United Kingdom) Racesport Salisbury	TVR Tuscan T400R	TVR Speed Six 4.0 L I6	D	91	(United Kingdom) Richard Stanton	1–3
(United Kingdom) Racesport Salisbury	TVR Tuscan T400R	TVR Speed Six 4.0 L I6	D	91	(United Kingdom) Graeme Mundy	1–3
(United Kingdom) Racesport Salisbury	TVR Tuscan T400R	TVR Speed Six 4.0 L I6	D	91	(United Kingdom) Steve Hyde	4
(United Kingdom) Racesport Salisbury	TVR Tuscan T400R	TVR Speed Six 4.0 L I6	D	91	(United Kingdom) Adam Sharpe	4
(United Kingdom) Cirtek Motorsport	Ferrari 360 Modena GTC	Ferrari F131 3.6 L V8	D	92	(New Zealand) Rob Wilson	All
(United Kingdom) Cirtek Motorsport	Ferrari 360 Modena GTC	Ferrari F131 3.6 L V8	D	92	(United Kingdom) Frank Mountain	1–3
(United Kingdom) Cirtek Motorsport	Ferrari 360 Modena GTC	Ferrari F131 3.6 L V8	D	92	(Netherlands) Hans Hugenholtz	1
(United Kingdom) Cirtek Motorsport	Ferrari 360 Modena GTC	Ferrari F131 3.6 L V8	D	92	(Saudi Arabia) Karim Ojjeh	2
(United Kingdom) Cirtek Motorsport	Ferrari 360 Modena GTC	Ferrari F131 3.6 L V8	D	92	(United Kingdom) Rory Passey	3
(United Kingdom) Cirtek Motorsport	Ferrari 360 Modena GTC	Ferrari F131 3.6 L V8	D	92	(United Kingdom) Andrew Kirkaldy	4
(United Kingdom) Cirtek Motorsport	Ferrari 360 Modena GTC	Ferrari F131 3.6 L V8	D	92	(Italy) Maurizio Fabris	4
(United Kingdom) Cirtek Motorsport	Porsche 911 GT3-RSR	Porsche M96/79 3.6 L Flat-6	D	93	(United Kingdom) Adam Jones	All
(United Kingdom) Cirtek Motorsport	Porsche 911 GT3-RSR	Porsche M96/79 3.6 L Flat-6	D	93	(Germany) Sascha Maassen	All
(United Kingdom) IN2 Racing	Porsche 911 GT3-RSR	Porsche M96/79 3.6 L Flat-6	D	96	(Denmark) Juan Barazi	4
(United Kingdom) IN2 Racing	Porsche 911 GT3-RSR	Porsche M96/79 3.6 L Flat-6	D	96	(Netherlands) Michael Vergers	4
(United Kingdom) IN2 Racing	Porsche 911 GT3-RSR	Porsche M96/79 3.6 L Flat-6	D	96	(United Kingdom) Nick Dudfield	4
(France) Auto Palace	Ferrari 360 Modena GTC	Ferrari F131 3.6 L V8	P	97	(France) Steeve Hiesse	1–3
(France) Auto Palace	Ferrari 360 Modena GTC	Ferrari F131 3.6 L V8	P	97	(Italy) Giovanni Lavaggi	1–3
(France) Auto Palace	Ferrari 360 Modena GTC	Ferrari F131 3.6 L V8	P	97	(Italy) Giampaolo Ermolli	1

== Season results ==
Overall winner in bold.

Rnd	Circuit	LMP1 Winning Team	LMP2 Winning Team	GTS Winning Team	GT Winning Team	Results
Rnd	Circuit	LMP1 Winning Drivers	LMP2 Winning Drivers	GTS Winning Drivers	GT Winning Drivers	Results
1	Monza	**(United Kingdom) #88 Audi Sport UK Team Veloqx**	(France) #99 PiR Compétition	(France) #86 Larbre Compétition	(Germany) #85 Freisinger Motorsport	Results
1	Monza	**(United Kingdom) Johnny Herbert** **(United Kingdom) Jamie Davies**	(France) Marc Rostan (France) Pierre Bruneau	(France) Christophe Bouchut (Portugal) Pedro Lamy (Switzerland) Steve Zacchia	(Monaco) Stéphane Ortelli (France) Romain Dumas	Results
2	Nürburgring	**(United Kingdom) #8 Audi Sport UK Team Veloqx**	(France) #13 Courage Compétition	(France) #86 Larbre Compétition	(United Kingdom) #93 Cirtek Motorsport	Results
2	Nürburgring	**(United Kingdom) Allan McNish** **(Germany) Pierre Kaffer**	(France) Jean-Marc Gounon (Switzerland) Alexander Frei (United Kingdom) Sam Hancock	(France) Christophe Bouchut (Portugal) Pedro Lamy (Switzerland) Steve Zacchia	(Germany) Sascha Maassen (United Kingdom) Adam Jones	Results
3	Silverstone	**(United Kingdom) #8 Audi Sport UK Team Veloqx**	(France) #13 Courage Compétition	(France) #86 Larbre Compétition	(Monaco) #70 JMB Racing	Results
3	Silverstone	**(United Kingdom) Allan McNish** **(Germany) Pierre Kaffer**	(France) Jean-Marc Gounon (Switzerland) Alexander Frei (United Kingdom) Sam Hancock	(France) Christophe Bouchut (Portugal) Pedro Lamy (Switzerland) Steve Zacchia	(France) Stéphane Daoudi (Russia) Roman Rusinov	Results
4	Spa	**(United Kingdom) #88 Audi Sport UK Team Veloqx**	(France) #13 Courage Compétition	(France) #86 Larbre Compétition	(Germany) #85 Freisinger Motorsport	Results
4	Spa	**(United Kingdom) Johnny Herbert** **(United Kingdom) Jamie Davies**	(France) Jonathan Cochet (Switzerland) Alexander Frei (United Kingdom) Sam Hancock	(France) Christophe Bouchut (Portugal) Pedro Lamy (Switzerland) Steve Zacchia	(Monaco) Stéphane Ortelli (France) Emmanuel Collard	Results

== Teams Championships ==
Points are awarded to the top 8 finishers in the order of 10-8-6-5-4-3-2-1. Teams with multiple entries do not have their cars combined, each entry number is scored separately in the championship. Cars failing to complete 70% of the winner's distance are not awarded points.

=== LMP1 Standings ===
Pos	No	Team	Chassis	Engine	MNZ (Italy)	NÜR (Germany)	SIL (United Kingdom)	SPA (Belgium)	Total
1	#88	(United Kingdom) Audi Sport UK Team Veloqx	Audi R8	Audi 3.6 L Turbo V8	1	2	3	1	34
2	#8	(United Kingdom) Audi Sport UK Team Veloqx	Audi R8	Audi 3.6 L Turbo V8	2	1	1	Ret	28
3	#5	(Japan) Team Goh	Audi R8	Audi 3.6 L Turbo V8	3	4	2	2	27
4	#3	(United Kingdom) Creation Autosportif	DBA 03S	Zytek ZG348 3.4 L V8	Ret	3	Ret	3	12
5	#7	(United Kingdom) RML	MG-Lola EX257	MG (AER) XP20 2.0 L Turbo I4	7	7	7	5	10
6=	#17	(France) Pescarolo Sport	Pescarolo C60	Judd GV5 5.0 L V10	4	5		Ret	9
6=	#69	(United Kingdom) Team Jota	Zytek 04S	Zytek ZG348 3.4L V8	Ret	8	6	4	9
8=	#6	(United Kingdom) Rollcentre Racing	Dallara SP1	Judd GV4 4.0 L V10	5	6	8	Ret	8
8=	#22	(United Kingdom) Zytek Engineering	Zytek 04S	Zytek ZG348 3.4 L V8	6		4		8
10	#14	(United Kingdom) Team Nasamax	Nasamax DM139	Judd GV5 5.0 L V10 (Bioethanol)	8		5		5
11	#11	(France) Larbre Compétition	Panoz GTP	Ford Élan 6L8 6.0 L V8				6	3
NC	#20	(United Kingdom) Lister Cars	Lister Storm LMP	Chevrolet LS1 6.0 L V8		Ret	Ret	Ret	0
NC	#10	(United Kingdom) Taurus Sports	Lola B2K/10	Judd GV4 4.0 L V10	Ret		Ret		0
NC	#9	(Japan) Advan Kondo Racing	Dome S101	Mugen MF408S 4.0 L V8	Ret				0
NC	#4	(United Kingdom) Taurus Sports	Lola B2K/10	Judd GV4 4.0 L V10	Ret				0
NC	#14	(United Kingdom) Team Nasamax	Nasamax DM139 (Reynard)	Judd GV5 5.0 L V10 (Bioethanol)				Ret	0
NC	#24	(Italy) Spinnaker Clandesteam	Dallara SP1	Judd GV4 4.0 L V10	DNS				0

=== LMP2 Standings ===
Pos	No	Team	Chassis	Engine	MNZ (Italy)	NÜR (Germany)	SIL (United Kingdom)	SPA (Belgium)	Total
1	#13	(France) Courage Compétition	Courage C65	MG (AER) XP20 2.0 L Turbo I4		1	1	1	30
2	#99	(France) PiR Compétition	Pilbeam MP91	JPX 3.4 L V6	1	2	4	6	26
3	#27	(United Kingdom) Tracsport	Lola B2K/40	Nissan (AER) VQL 3.0 L V6		3	5	4	15
4	#36	(France) Gerard Welter	WR LMP2	Peugeot ES9 3.4 L V6		DSQ	2	3	14
5	#26	(France) Paul Belmondo Racing	Courage C65	MG (AER) XP20 2.0 L Turbo I4	Ret	Ret	Ret	2	8
6	#31	(Switzerland) Equipe Palmyr	Lucchini SR2000	Alfa Romeo 3.0 L V6		Ret	3	Ret	6
7	#35	(Belgium) G-Force Racing	Pilbeam MP84	Nissan (AER) VQL 3.0 L V6		4	NC	Ret	5
8	#32	(Italy) Lucchini Engineering	Lucchini LMP2/04	Judd XV675 3.4 L V8				5	4
NC	#28	(Italy) Team Ranieri Randaccio	Tampolli RTA99	Ford Nicholson-McLaren XB 3.3 L V8	Ret	Ret	Ret		0
NC	#32	(United States) Intersport Racing	Lola B2K/40	Judd KV675 3.4 L V8	Ret				0
NC	#34	(United Kingdom) K2 Race Engineering	Pilbeam MP91	Judd KV675 3.4 L V8			Ret		0
NC	#33	(Austria) Renauer Motorsport	Tampolli RTA99	Alfa Romeo 3.0 L V6		DNS			0

=== GTS Standings ===
Pos	No	Team	Chassis	Engine	MNZ (Italy)	NÜR (Germany)	SIL^{†} (United Kingdom)	SPA (Belgium)	Total
1	#86	(France) Larbre Compétition	Ferrari 550-GTS Maranello	Ferrari F133 A 6.0 L V12	1	1	1	1	35
2	#61	(Netherlands) Barron Connor Racing	Ferrari 575-GTC Maranello	Ferrari F133 GT 6.0 L V12	2	4	4	4	20.5
3	#62	(Netherlands) Barron Connor Racing	Ferrari 575-GTC Maranello	Ferrari F133 GT 6.0 L V12	Ret	5	2	3	14
4	#52	(United Kingdom) Graham Nash Motorsport	Saleen S7-R	Ford Windsor 7.0 L V8	NC	3	3	5	13
5=	#59	(Germany) Vitaphone Racing (Germany) Konrad Motorsport	Saleen S7-R	Ford Windsor 7.0 L V8	Ret	2	Ret	Ret	8
5=	#87	(France) Larbre Compétition	Ferrari 550-GTS Maranello	Ferrari F133 A 6.0 L V12				2	8
NC	#51	(Italy) MAC Racing (Italy) Scuderia Veregra	Chrysler Viper GTS-R	Chrysler EWB 8.0 L V10	Ret	Ret			0
NC	#60	(France) Force One Racing	Chrysler Viper GTS-R	Chrysler EWB 8.0 L V10	Ret	Ret			0
NC	#53	(Germany) Konrad Motorsport	Saleen S7-R	Ford Windsor 7.0 L V8		Ret			0
NC	#50	(Germany) A-Level Engineering	Porsche 911 Bi-Turbo	Porsche 3.6 L Turbo Flat-6		DNS	DNS		0

† - Half points were awarded due to a lack of competitors.

=== GT Standings ===
Pos	No	Team	Chassis	Engine	MNZ (Italy)	NÜR (Germany)	SIL (United Kingdom)	SPA (Belgium)	Total
1	#80	(United Kingdom) Sebah Automotive Ltd.	Porsche 911 GT3-R	Porsche M96/77 3.6 L Flat-6	5	2	2	3	26
2	#70	(Monaco) JMB Racing	Ferrari 360 Modena GTC	Ferrari F131 3.6 L V8	2	6	1	5	25
3	#85	(Germany) Freisinger Motorsport	Porsche 911 GT3-RSR	Porsche M96/79 3.6 L Flat-6	1		5	1	24
4	#93	(United Kingdom) Cirtek Motorsport	Porsche 911 GT3-RSR	Porsche M96/79 3.6 L Flat-6	6	1		2	21
5	#77	(Japan) Choro Q Racing Team	Porsche 911 GT3-RSR	Porsche M96/79 3.6 L Flat-6	3	3	8		13
6	#84	(Germany) Seikel Motorsport	Porsche 911 GT3-RS	Porsche M96/77 3.6 L Flat-6	8	4	4	8	12
7	#81	(Germany) Farnbacher Racing	Porsche 911 GT3-RSR	Porsche M96/79 3.6 L Flat-6			3	4	11
8	#81	(United States) The Racer's Group	Porsche 911 GT3-RSR	Porsche M96/79 3.6 L Flat-6	4				5
9=	#92	(United Kingdom) Cirtek Motorsport	Ferrari 360 Modena GTC	Ferrari F131 3.6 L V8	7	7			4
9=	#97	(France) Auto Palace	Ferrari 360 Modena GTC	Ferrari F131 3.6 L V8		5			4
11=	#91	(United Kingdom) Racesport Salisbury	TVR Tuscan T400R	TVR Speed Six 4.0 L I6		8	7		3
11=	#89	(United Kingdom) Chamberlain-Synergy Motorsport	TVR Tuscan T400R	TVR Speed Six 4.0 L I6			6		3
11=	#90	(Japan) T2M Motorsport	Porsche 911 GT3-RS	Porsche M96/77 3.6 L Flat-6				6	3
14	#75	(Italy) Autorlando Sport	Porsche 911 GT3-RS	Porsche M96/77 3.6 L Flat-6				7	2
