= 2004 1000 km of Silverstone =

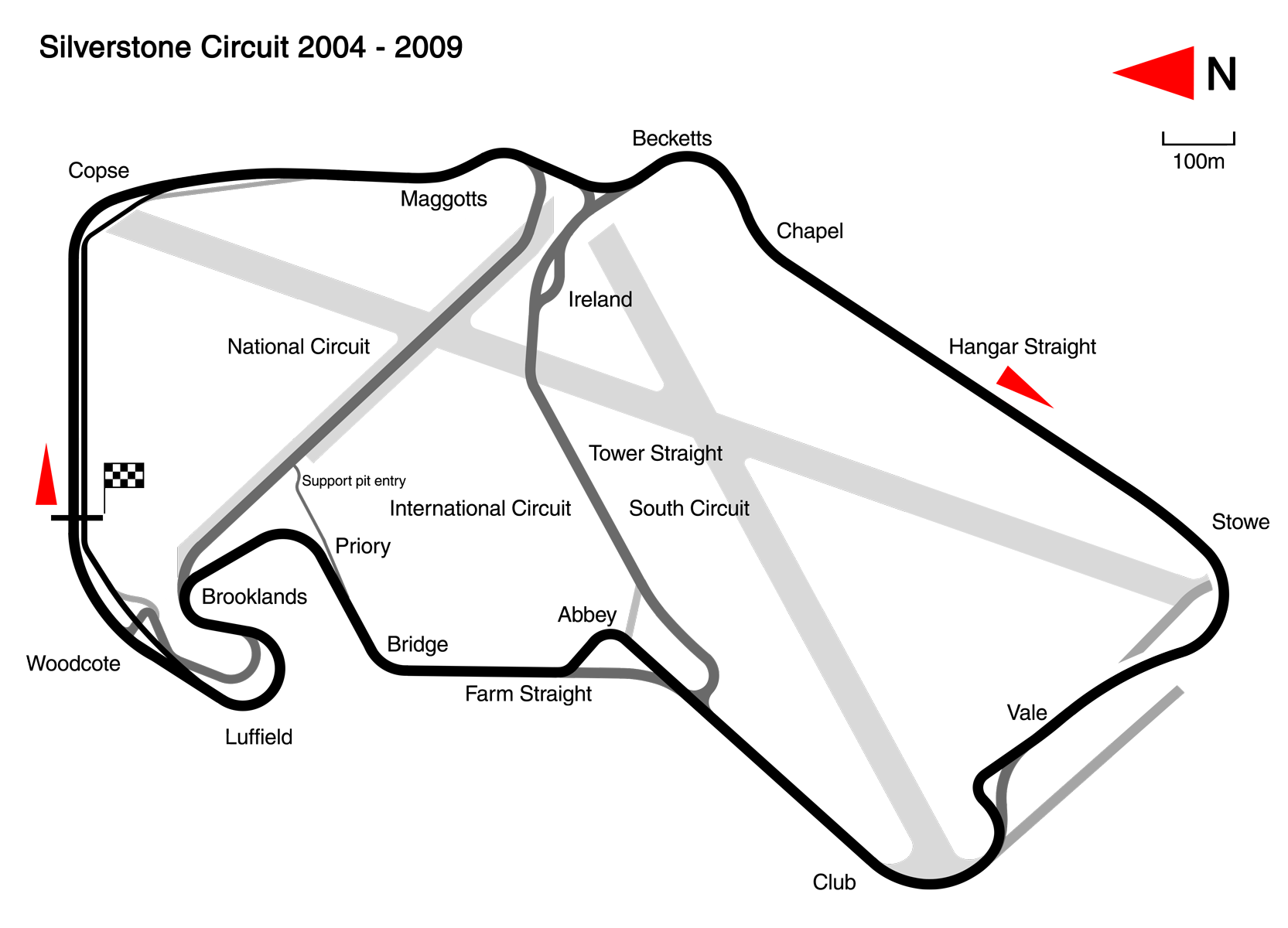
Map of the Silverstone Circuit (2004–2009)

The 2004 1000 km of Silverstone was the third round of the 2004 Le Mans Series season, held at the Silverstone Circuit, United Kingdom. It was run on 13 August 2004.

== Official results ==
Class winners in bold. Cars failing to complete 70% of winner's distance marked as Not Classified (NC).

Pos	Class	No	Team	Drivers	Chassis	Tyre	Laps
Pos	Class	No	Team	Drivers	Engine	Tyre	Laps
1	**LMP1**	**8**	**(United Kingdom) Audi Sport UK Team Veloqx**	**(United Kingdom) Allan McNish (Germany) Pierre Kaffer**	**Audi R8**	**MI**	**195**
1	**LMP1**	**8**	**(United Kingdom) Audi Sport UK Team Veloqx**	**(United Kingdom) Allan McNish (Germany) Pierre Kaffer**	**Audi 3.6l Turbo V8**	**MI**	**195**
2	LMP1	5	(Japan) Team Goh	(Italy) Rinaldo Capello (Japan) Seiji Ara	Audi R8	**MI**	194
2	LMP1	5	(Japan) Team Goh	(Italy) Rinaldo Capello (Japan) Seiji Ara	Audi 3.6L Turbo V8	**MI**	194
3	LMP1	88	(United Kingdom) Audi Sport UK Team Veloqx	(United Kingdom) Johnny Herbert (United Kingdom) Jamie Davies	Audi R8	**MI**	193
3	LMP1	88	(United Kingdom) Audi Sport UK Team Veloqx	(United Kingdom) Johnny Herbert (United Kingdom) Jamie Davies	Audi 3.6L Turbo V8	**MI**	193
4	LMP1	22	(United Kingdom) Zytek Engineering	(United Kingdom) Robbie Kerr (United States) Chris Dyson	Zytek 04S	**MI**	192
4	LMP1	22	(United Kingdom) Zytek Engineering	(United Kingdom) Robbie Kerr (United States) Chris Dyson	Zytek ZG348 3.4L V8	**MI**	192
5	LMP1	14	(United Kingdom) Team Nasamax	(France) Romain Dumas (South Africa) Werner Lupberger (Canada) Robbie Stirling	Nasamax DM139 (Reynard)	**MI**	182
5	LMP1	14	(United Kingdom) Team Nasamax	(France) Romain Dumas (South Africa) Werner Lupberger (Canada) Robbie Stirling	Judd GV5 5.0L V10 (Bio-ethanol)	**MI**	182
6	LMP1	69	(United Kingdom) Team Jota	(United Kingdom) Sam Hignett (United Kingdom) John Stack (Italy) Gianni Collini	Zytek 04S	**D**	181
6	LMP1	69	(United Kingdom) Team Jota	(United Kingdom) Sam Hignett (United Kingdom) John Stack (Italy) Gianni Collini	Zytek ZG348 3.4L V8	**D**	181
7	**LMP2**	**13**	**(France) Courage Compétition**	**(France) Jean-Marc Gounon (United Kingdom) Sam Hancock (Switzerland) Alexander Frei**	**Courage C65**	**MI**	**178**
7	**LMP2**	**13**	**(France) Courage Compétition**	**(France) Jean-Marc Gounon (United Kingdom) Sam Hancock (Switzerland) Alexander Frei**	**MG (AER) XP20 2.0L Turbo I4**	**MI**	**178**
8	LMP1	7	(United Kingdom) RML	(United Kingdom) Mike Newton (Brazil) Thomas Erdos (Portugal) Miguel Ramos	MG-Lola EX257	**D**	174
8	LMP1	7	(United Kingdom) RML	(United Kingdom) Mike Newton (Brazil) Thomas Erdos (Portugal) Miguel Ramos	MG (AER) XP20 2.0L Turbo I4	**D**	174
9	**GTS**	**86**	**(France) Larbre Compétition**	**(France) Christophe Bouchut (Portugal) Pedro Lamy (Switzerland) Steve Zacchia**	**Ferrari 550-GTS Maranello**	**MI**	**174**
9	**GTS**	**86**	**(France) Larbre Compétition**	**(France) Christophe Bouchut (Portugal) Pedro Lamy (Switzerland) Steve Zacchia**	**Ferrari 5.9L V12**	**MI**	**174**
10	GTS	62	(Netherlands) Barron Connor Racing	(Netherlands) Mike Hezemans (Switzerland) Jean-Denis Délétraz (Italy) Andrea Piccini	Ferrari 575-GTC Maranello	**P**	171
10	GTS	62	(Netherlands) Barron Connor Racing	(Netherlands) Mike Hezemans (Switzerland) Jean-Denis Délétraz (Italy) Andrea Piccini	Ferrari 6.0L V12	**P**	171
11	GTS	52	(United Kingdom) Graham Nash Motorsport	(United Kingdom) David Leslie (United Kingdom) Paul Whight (United Kingdom) Phillip Bennett	Saleen S7-R	**D**	169
11	GTS	52	(United Kingdom) Graham Nash Motorsport	(United Kingdom) David Leslie (United Kingdom) Paul Whight (United Kingdom) Phillip Bennett	Ford 6.9L V8	**D**	169
12	LMP2	36	(France) Welter Racing	(France) Jean-Bernard Bouvet (France) Jean-René de Fournoux	WR LMP2	**MI**	168
12	LMP2	36	(France) Welter Racing	(France) Jean-Bernard Bouvet (France) Jean-René de Fournoux	Peugeot 3.4L V6	**MI**	168
13	GTS	61	(Netherlands) Barron Connor Racing	(Italy) Thomas Biagi (United States) Danny Sullivan (Netherlands) John Bosch	Ferrari 575-GTC Maranello	**P**	168
13	GTS	61	(Netherlands) Barron Connor Racing	(Italy) Thomas Biagi (United States) Danny Sullivan (Netherlands) John Bosch	Ferrari 6.0L V12	**P**	168
14	**GT**	**70**	**(Monaco) JMB Racing**	**(France) Stéphane Daoudi (Russia) Roman Rusinov**	**Ferrari 360 Modena GT**	**D**	**166**
14	**GT**	**70**	**(Monaco) JMB Racing**	**(France) Stéphane Daoudi (Russia) Roman Rusinov**	**Ferrari 3.6L V8**	**D**	**166**
15	LMP1	6	(United Kingdom) Rollcentre Racing	(United Kingdom) Martin Short (United Kingdom) Patrick Pearce (Portugal) João Barbosa	Dallara SP1	**D**	165
15	LMP1	6	(United Kingdom) Rollcentre Racing	(United Kingdom) Martin Short (United Kingdom) Patrick Pearce (Portugal) João Barbosa	Judd GV4 4.0L V10	**D**	165
16	GT	80	(United Kingdom) Sebah Automotive	(United Kingdom) Piers Masarati (France) Xavier Pompidou	Porsche 911 GT3-R	**D**	165
16	GT	80	(United Kingdom) Sebah Automotive	(United Kingdom) Piers Masarati (France) Xavier Pompidou	Porsche 3.6L Flat-6	**D**	165
17	GT	81	(Germany) Farnbacher Racing	(United States) Patrick Long (Denmark) Lars-Erik Nielsen (Denmark) Thorkild Thyrring	Porsche 911 GT3-RSR	**D**	165
17	GT	81	(Germany) Farnbacher Racing	(United States) Patrick Long (Denmark) Lars-Erik Nielsen (Denmark) Thorkild Thyrring	Porsche 3.6L Flat-6	**D**	165
18	GT	84	(Germany) Seikel Motorsport	(Canada) Tony Burgess (United States) Philip Collin (France) Gaël Lesoudier	Porsche 911 GT3-RS	**Y**	163
18	GT	84	(Germany) Seikel Motorsport	(Canada) Tony Burgess (United States) Philip Collin (France) Gaël Lesoudier	Porsche 3.6L Flat-6	**Y**	163
19	GT	85	(Germany) Freisinger Motorsport	(France) Emmanuel Collard (Monaco) Stéphane Ortelli	Porsche 911 GT3-RSR	**D**	162
19	GT	85	(Germany) Freisinger Motorsport	(France) Emmanuel Collard (Monaco) Stéphane Ortelli	Porsche 3.6L Flat-6	**D**	162
20	GT	89	(United Kingdom) Chamberlain-Synergy Motorsport	(United Kingdom) Jonny Kane (United Kingdom) Warren Hughes	TVR Tuscan T400R	**D**	161
20	GT	89	(United Kingdom) Chamberlain-Synergy Motorsport	(United Kingdom) Jonny Kane (United Kingdom) Warren Hughes	TVR 4.0L I6	**D**	161
21	GT	91	(United Kingdom) Racesport Salisbury	(United Kingdom) Graeme Mundy (United Kingdom) Richard Stanton (United Kingdom) John Hartshorne	TVR Tuscan T400R	**D**	156
21	GT	91	(United Kingdom) Racesport Salisbury	(United Kingdom) Graeme Mundy (United Kingdom) Richard Stanton (United Kingdom) John Hartshorne	TVR 4.0L I6	**D**	156
22	LMP2	31	(Switzerland) Equipe Palmyr	(France) Grégory Fargier (Switzerland) Philippe Favre (Switzerland) Christophe Ricard	Lucchini SR2000	**D**	153
22	LMP2	31	(Switzerland) Equipe Palmyr	(France) Grégory Fargier (Switzerland) Philippe Favre (Switzerland) Christophe Ricard	Alfa Romeo 3.0L V6	**D**	153
23	GT	77	(Japan) Choro Q Racing Team	(Japan) Kazuyuki Nishizawa (Japan) Haruki Kurosawa	Porsche 911 GT3-RSR	**Y**	150
23	GT	77	(Japan) Choro Q Racing Team	(Japan) Kazuyuki Nishizawa (Japan) Haruki Kurosawa	Porsche 3.6L Flat-6	**Y**	150
24	LMP2	99	(France) Pierre Bruneau	(France) Pierre Bruneau (France) Marc Rostan	Pilbeam MP91	**MI**	148
24	LMP2	99	(France) Pierre Bruneau	(France) Pierre Bruneau (France) Marc Rostan	JPX (Mader) 3.4L V6	**MI**	148
25	GT	90	(Germany) T2M Motorsport	(United Kingdom) Robin Liddell (France) Gilles Vannelet (Japan) Yukihiro Hane	Porsche 911 GT3-RS	**Y**	142
25	GT	90	(Germany) T2M Motorsport	(United Kingdom) Robin Liddell (France) Gilles Vannelet (Japan) Yukihiro Hane	Porsche 3.6L Flat-6	**Y**	142
26 NC	LMP2	27	(United Kingdom) Tracsport	(United Kingdom) John Gaw (United Kingdom) John Ingram (United Kingdom) Rick Pearson	Lola B2K/40	**D**	139
26 NC	LMP2	27	(United Kingdom) Tracsport	(United Kingdom) John Gaw (United Kingdom) John Ingram (United Kingdom) Rick Pearson	Nissan (AER) VQL 3.0L V6	**D**	139
27 NC	GT	71	(United Kingdom) JWR	(United Kingdom) Mike Jordan (United Kingdom) Johnny Mowlem	Porsche 911 GT3-RSR	**D**	124
27 NC	GT	71	(United Kingdom) JWR	(United Kingdom) Mike Jordan (United Kingdom) Johnny Mowlem	Porsche 3.6L Flat-6	**D**	124
28 NC	LMP2	35	(Belgium) G-Force Racing	(Belgium) Frank Hahn (United Kingdom) Tim Greaves (France) Jean-François Leroch	Pilbeam MP84	**D**	121
28 NC	LMP2	35	(Belgium) G-Force Racing	(Belgium) Frank Hahn (United Kingdom) Tim Greaves (France) Jean-François Leroch	Nissan (AER) VQL 3.0L V6	**D**	121
29 DNF	LMP1	20	(United Kingdom) Lister Racing	(United Kingdom) Justin Keen (United Kingdom) Rob Barff	Lister Storm LMP	**D**	126
29 DNF	LMP1	20	(United Kingdom) Lister Racing	(United Kingdom) Justin Keen (United Kingdom) Rob Barff	Chevrolet LS1 6.0L V8	**D**	126
30 DNF	LMP1	10	(United Kingdom) Taurus Sports	(United Kingdom) Phil Andrews (United Kingdom) Calum Lockie (United Kingdom) Richard Jones	Lola B2K/10	**D**	105
30 DNF	LMP1	10	(United Kingdom) Taurus Sports	(United Kingdom) Phil Andrews (United Kingdom) Calum Lockie (United Kingdom) Richard Jones	Caterpillar 5.0L Turbo V10 (Diesel)	**D**	105
31 DNF	LMP2	28	(Italy) Team Ranieri Randaccio	(Italy) Ranieri Randaccio (Italy) Fabio Mancini	Tampolli RTA99	**G**	105
31 DNF	LMP2	28	(Italy) Team Ranieri Randaccio	(Italy) Ranieri Randaccio (Italy) Fabio Mancini	Ford (Nicholson-McLaren) 3.3L V8	**G**	105
32 DNF	GTS	59	(Germany) Vitaphone Racing (Germany) Konrad Motorsport	(Germany) Uwe Alzen (Germany) Michael Bartels (Austria) Franz Konrad	Saleen S7-R	**P**	94
32 DNF	GTS	59	(Germany) Vitaphone Racing (Germany) Konrad Motorsport	(Germany) Uwe Alzen (Germany) Michael Bartels (Austria) Franz Konrad	Ford 6.9L V8	**P**	94
33 DNF	LMP1	3	(United Kingdom) Creation Autosportif	(France) Nicolas Minassian (United Kingdom) Jamie Campbell-Walter	DBA 03S	**D**	85
33 DNF	LMP1	3	(United Kingdom) Creation Autosportif	(France) Nicolas Minassian (United Kingdom) Jamie Campbell-Walter	Zytek ZG348 3.4L V8	**D**	85
34 DNF	GT	92	(United Kingdom) Cirtek Motorsport	(United Kingdom) Frank Mountain (United Kingdom) Rory Passey (New Zealand) Rob Wilson	Ferrari 360 Modena GTC	**D**	80
34 DNF	GT	92	(United Kingdom) Cirtek Motorsport	(United Kingdom) Frank Mountain (United Kingdom) Rory Passey (New Zealand) Rob Wilson	Ferrari 3.6L V8	**D**	80
35 DNF	LMP2	34	(United Kingdom) K2 Race Engineering	(United Kingdom) Simon Pullan (United Kingdom) Peter Owen (United Kingdom) Ben Devlin	Pilbeam MP91	?	55
35 DNF	LMP2	34	(United Kingdom) K2 Race Engineering	(United Kingdom) Simon Pullan (United Kingdom) Peter Owen (United Kingdom) Ben Devlin	Judd KV675 3.4L V8	?	55
36 DNF	GT	93	(United Kingdom) Cirtek Motorsport	(United Kingdom) Adam Jones (Germany) Sascha Maassen	Porsche 911 GT3-RSR	**D**	55
36 DNF	GT	93	(United Kingdom) Cirtek Motorsport	(United Kingdom) Adam Jones (Germany) Sascha Maassen	Porsche 3.6L Flat-6	**D**	55
37 DNF	LMP2	26	(France) Paul Belmondo Racing	(France) Paul Belmondo (France) Claude-Yves Gosselin (France) Marco Saviozzi	Courage C65	**MI**	39
37 DNF	LMP2	26	(France) Paul Belmondo Racing	(France) Paul Belmondo (France) Claude-Yves Gosselin (France) Marco Saviozzi	MG (AER) XP20 2.0L Turbo I4	**MI**	39
38 DNF	GT	97	(France) Auto Palace	(France) Steeve Hiesse (Italy) Giovanni Lavaggi	Ferrari 360GT	**P**	8
38 DNF	GT	97	(France) Auto Palace	(France) Steeve Hiesse (Italy) Giovanni Lavaggi	Ferrari 3.6L V8	**P**	8
DNS	GTS	50	(Germany) A-Level Engineering	(Germany) Wolfgang Kaufmann (Belgium) Eric van de Poele	Porsche 911 Bi-Turbo	**MI**	-
DNS	GTS	50	(Germany) A-Level Engineering	(Germany) Wolfgang Kaufmann (Belgium) Eric van de Poele	Porsche 3.6L Turbo Flat-6	**MI**	-
DNQ^{†}	GT	74	(United Kingdom) RSR Racing	(United Kingdom) Nigel Greensall (United Kingdom) Lawrence Tomlinson	TVR Tuscan T400R	**D**	-
DNQ^{†}	GT	74	(United Kingdom) RSR Racing	(United Kingdom) Nigel Greensall (United Kingdom) Lawrence Tomlinson	TVR 4.0L I6	**D**	-

† - #74 RSR Racing was not allowed to qualify due to failing technical scrutineering.

== Statistics ==
- Pole Position - #22 Zytek Engineering - 1:34.033
- Fastest Lap - #22 Zytek Engineering - 1:36.932
- Average Speed - 180.263 km/h

Le Mans Series
Previous race: 2004 1000km of Nürburgring	2004 season	Next race: 2004 1000km of Spa
