= Gregor Fisken =

British racing driver and businessman

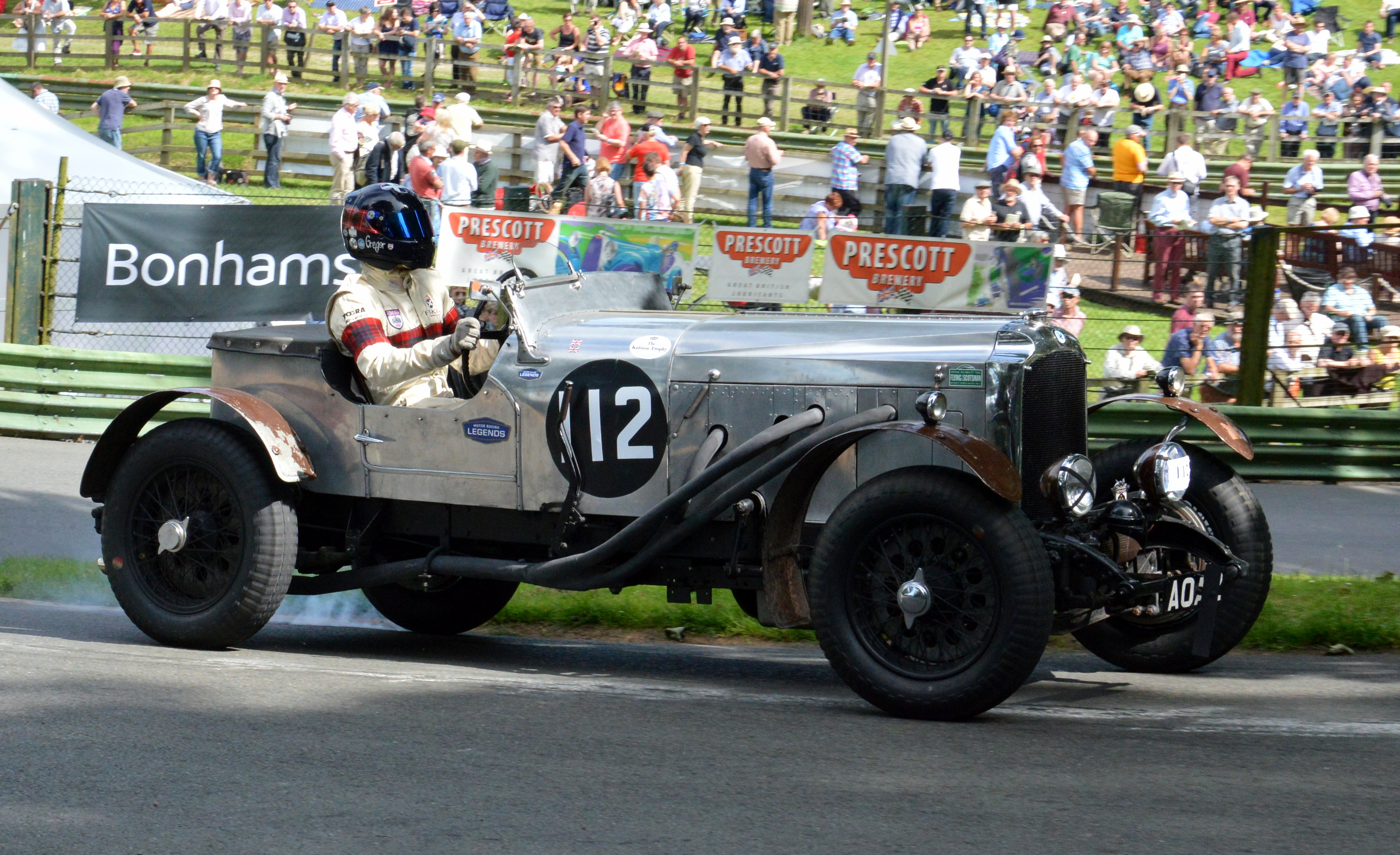
- Fisken in 2015
- Nationality: (United Kingdom) British
- Born: Gregor Callander Fisken; 28 September 1964 (age 62) Forfar, Scotland
- Categorisation: FIA Silver (until 2015); FIA Bronze (2016–)

24 Hours of Le Mans career
- Years: 2004–2007
- Teams: Racers Group; Intersport (LMP2); Courage (LMP1); Larbre Competition (GT1)
- Best finish: 6th in class / 18th overall (2004)

Gregor Callander Fisken (born 28 September 1964) is a British racing driver and businessman who currently races historic and modern-day sportscars. He is one of only a handful of racing drivers to have driven in all four classes (LMP1, LMP2, GT1 and GT2) at the famous Le Mans 24 Hours motor race.

== Early career ==
Fisken began his career as an apprentice mechanic with the famous Scottish restorer and dealer of pre-war motorcars, Bunty Scott-Moncrieff, while also trying his luck at rallycross in old cars he prepared. In the late 1980s Fisken worked in the sales department of Coys of Kensington, an upmarket classic car dealership in a Kensington Mews.

In 1996, Fisken’s passion for classic cars led him to open his dealership, Fiskens Fine Historic Automobiles, in London’s upmarket South Kensington. As of 2026, the business continues to operate successfully, with the premises across two Mews properties as well as trade show stands at events such as Retromobile and the Concours d'Elegance at Hampton Court amongst others.

== Racing success ==
With continuing business success, Fisken decided to turn his attention back to racing – both in historic cars and more modern machinery.

In 1998, Fisken managed the feat of winning his class in both the Tour Auto and the Monaco Historic Grand Prix as well as finish a competitive second overall in the British Empire Trophy at Silverstone in a Porsche 962 Group C car. A first foray in modern racing netted Fisken a third in the Silverstone GT race in a McLaren F1 GTR.

Due to a lack of spare time, Fisken was forced to cut back on his racing activities in 1999 and 2000, only being able to compete in one race each year. Success still arrived though, scoring a third in class in the Spa 3 Hours and winning his class for the second time in the Monaco Historic Grand Prix.

For 2001, Fisken competed in the Spa 24 Hours, but was unable to finish due to mechanical failure, in modern racing as well as two other races in classic cars: the Goodwood Revival Meeting Tourist Trophy, which he won with team-mate Emanuele Pirro, and the Nurburgring 500 km where he won his class on the famous Nordschleife.

2002 saw Fisken return to the Nordschleife for the Nürburgring 24 Hours where he finished third in class in a BMW M3 despite spending over an hour in the pits with mechanical problems.

Work commitments proved too much in 2003, but a return to modern racing in 2004 saw Fisken compete in two iconic races: the Sebring 12 Hours and the Le Mans 24 Hours, both with the GT – Racers Group Porsche GT3 RSR.

Attracted by endurance racing, in 2005 Fisken signed up to the Intersport team for two rounds of the American Le Mans Series (with a best in class result in Portland) and the Le Mans 24 Hours (retired after having led his class), and with Team Jota for two rounds of the Le Mans Series (best result of fifth overall in Istanbul).

Mechanical problems plagued the 2006 season in which the best result possible was a first in class in the Shell Historic Ferrari Challenge and a fourth in the Donington 1000 km driving an LMP1 works Courage.

2007 saw Fisken race for the complete year in the Le Mans Series for Larbre Competition in the Aston Martin DBR9 with a best result being first in class in the Mille Milhas, Interlagos, Brazil. He did, however, manage to make the finish in the Le Mans 24 Hours, with the same car, with a respectable 13th in class. He was also awarded the Scott Moncrieffe award, named after his former employer Bunty, given for sportsmanship and services to historic racing.

In 2008, Fisken experienced the thrill of a lifetime driving the famous Ferrari 330 P3 at Paul Ricard, twice finishing on the podium. An appearance at the Le Mans Classic and Silverstone Classic weekends showed that he had lost none of his passion for old-timers. A return to the American Le Mans Series quickly followed with 19th position overall and fourth in the LMP1 class at Road America with Intersport.

2013 saw Fisken return to the British GT Championship with Trackspeed sharing a Porsche 997 GT3 R dubbed the "Tartan Terror" with factory Porsche ace Richard Westbrook. Its unmistakable art-car livery inspired by Gregor Fiskens' family Frazer Red tartan was a bold celebration of his Scottish heritage and made the car something of an icon. A win at Rockingham and a podium at Donington rounded out a competitive season. The Tartan Terror was recently purchased back by Fisken who continues to use it in historic racing.

== 24 Hours of Le Mans results ==
Year	Team	Co-Drivers	Car	Class	Laps	Pos.	Class Pos.
2004	(United States) The Racer's Group	(Denmark) Lars-Erik Nielsen (United Kingdom) Ian Donaldson	Porsche 911 GT3-RSR	GT	314	18th	6th
2005	(United States) Intersport Racing	(United States) Liz Halliday (United Kingdom) Sam Hancock	Lola B05/40-AER	LMP2	119	DNF	DNF
2006	(France) Courage Compétition	(United Kingdom) Sam Hancock (Switzerland) Alexander Frei	Courage LC70-Mugen	LMP1	171	DNF	DNF
2007	(France) Aston Martin Racing Larbre	(France) Patrick Bornhauser (France) Roland Bervillé	Aston Martin DBR9	GT1	272	29th	13th

== Historic Racing ==
Gregor’s Historic racing career has run parallel to his modern competition, with notable results achieved at headlining events such as the Monaco Historic Grand Prix, Le Mans Classic, Goodwood Revival, Spa Classic, and the Rolex Monterey Motorsport Reunion. He has been entrusted with racing vehicles of the utmost importance such as the 1959 Le Mans-winning Aston Martin DBR1 (chassis DBR1/2), the pioneering Jaguar prototype E2A, Ferrari 250 GTOs and LMs, Blower Bentleys, and the very DBR9s he raced in period. Since 2016 Gregor has served as a Governor at Goodwood.

Gregor has also completed numerous tours and rallies including the Tour Auto, Flying Scotsman, London to Brighton Run, Modena Cento Ore, and Mille Miglia with his last Mille Miglia drive coming in a 1931 Alfa Romeo 8C 2300 which competed on the Mille Miglia twice in period (1932 & 1934).

A non-exhaustive list of historic competition is as follows -

== Goodwood results ==
Year	Event	Trophy	Co-Drivers	Car	Result
2006	Goodwood Revival	Richmond Trophy	-	Ferrari 246 Dino	2nd
2008	Goodwood Revival	Richmond & Gordon Trophy	-	Maserati 250 F	ABN
2010	Goodwood Revival	Whitsun Trophy	-	Ford GT40	14th
2012	Goodwood Revival	Richmond & Gordon Trophy	-	Maserati 250 F	7th
2012	Goodwood Revival	Sussex Trophy	-	Maserati 300S	9th
2012	Goodwood Revival	Shelby Cup	(United Kingdom) Rory Henderson	Shelby Cobra	RTD
2013	Goodwood Revival	Royal Automobile Club Tourist Trophy	(United Kingdom) Peter Hardman	Jaguar E-Type	7th
2013	Goodwood Revival	Sussex Trophy	-	Jaguar D-Type	7th
2014	Goodwood 72nd Members' Meeting	Moss Trophy	(United Kingdom) John Minshaw	Jaguar E-Type	12th
2014	Goodwood Revival	Lavant Cup	-	Jaguar D-Type	3rd
2015	Goodwood Revival	Royal Automobile Club Tourist Trophy	(United Kingdom) Bobby Verdon-Roe	Jaguar E-Type	8th
2015	Goodwood Revival	Brooklands Trophy	-	Vauxhall 30/98	11th
2015	Goodwood Revival	Richmond & Gordon Trophy	-	Maserati 250 F	5th
2016	Goodwood 74th Members' Meeting	Graham Hill Trophy	-	Iso A3C Bizzarrini	14th
2016	Goodwood Revival	Freddie March Memorial Trophy	-	Maserati 200SI	4th
2017	Goodwood 75th Members' Meeting	Graham Hill Trophy	(United Kingdom) Andrew Hall	Iso A3C Bizzarrini	11th
2017	Goodwood Revival	Kinrara Trophy	(Denmark) Tom Kristensen	Jaguar E-Type	2nd
2017	Goodwood Revival	Royal Automobile Club Tourist Trophy	(United Kingdom) Chris Wilson	Shelby Cobra 289	12th
2018	Goodwood 76th Members' Meeting	Moss Trophy	(United Kingdom) Dario Franchitti	Jaguar E-Type	DNF
2018	Goodwood Revival	Kinrara Trophy	(United Kingdom) Marino Franchitti	Jaguar E-Type	DNF
2019	Goodwood 77th Members' Meeting	John Duff Trophy	-	Vauxhall 30/98	1st
2019	Goodwood Revival	Royal Automobile Club Tourist Trophy	(United Kingdom) Dario Franchitti	Shelby Cobra 289 Le Mans	6th
2020	Goodwood Speed Week	Lavant Cup	-	HWM-Jaguar	7th
2020	Goodwood Speed Week	Royal Automobile Club Tourist Trophy	(United Kingdom) Dario Franchitti	Shelby Cobra 289 Le Mans	9th
2020	Goodwood Speed Week	Stirling Moss Memorial Trophy	(United Kingdom) Marino Franchitti	Jaguar E-Type	3rd
2021	Goodwood 78th Members' Meeting	Salvadori Cup	-	HWM-Jaguar	5th
2021	Goodwood 78th Members' Meeting	Moss Trophy	-	Jaguar E-Type	5th
2021	Goodwood Revival	Freddie March Memorial Trophy	-	HWM-Jaguar	DNF
2021	Goodwood Revival	Royal Automobile Club Tourist Trophy	(United Kingdom) Sam Hancock	Shelby Cobra 289 Le Mans	DNF
2021	Goodwood Revival	Brooklands Trophy	(United Kingdom) Christoff Cowens	Vauxhall 30/98	6th
2021	Goodwood Revival	Sussex Trophy	-	Jaguar E2A	RTD
2022	Goodwood Revival	St Mary's Trophy	(United States) Jimmie Johnson	Ford Galaxie	3rd
2023	Goodwood 80th Members' Meeting	Moss Trophy	-	Jaguar E-Type	5th
2023	Goodwood Revival	Freddie March Memorial Trophy	(United Kingdom) Jake Hill	HWM-Jaguar	2nd
2024	Goodwood 81st Members' Meeting	Peter Collins Trophy	-	Jaguar D-Type	DNF
2024	Goodwood Revival	St Mary's Trophy	(United States) Jimmie Johnson	Ford Galaxie	3rd
2024	Goodwood Revival	Stirling Moss Trophy	(United Kingdom) Chris Ward	Shelby Cobra 260	3rd
2025	Goodwood 82nd Members' Meeting	Moss Trophy	-	Shelby Cobra 260	2nd
2025	Goodwood Revival	Stirling Moss Trophy	(United Kingdom) Dario Franchitti	Shelby Cobra 260	2nd
2026	Goodwood 83rd Members' Meeting	Protheroe Cup	(United Kingdom) Dario Franchitti	Jaguar E-Type	1st

== Grand Prix Historique de Monaco results ==
Year	Car	Grid	Laps	Pos.
2016	Shadow DN5	Series G	17	5th
2018	Maserati 200SI	Series C	10	7th
2022	Shadow DN5	Series E	17	7th
2024	HWM-Jaguar	Series C	10	5th

== Le Mans Classic results ==
Year	Grid	Co-Driver	Car	Class	Class Pos.	Overall Pos.
2002	Plateau 4	-	Iso A3C Bizzarrini	-		
2006	Plateau 2	(Germany) Burkhard von Schenk (Germany) Jürgen Zerha	Maserati A6GCS	TSRC4		
2006	Plateau 3	(Germany) Burkhard von Schenk (Germany) Jürgen Zerha	Porsche RS 61	TSRC4		
2006	Plateau 4	(United Kingdom) Jo Bamford (United Kingdom) Sam Hancock (United Kingdom) Andrew Newall	Ferrari 250 GTO	GTS12		
2006	Plateau 5	(United Kingdom) Jo Bamford (United Kingdom) Sam Hancock (United Kingdom) Andrew Newall	Ferrari 365 GTB/4	TSRC2		
2006	Plateau 5	(United Kingdom) Jo Bamford (United Kingdom) Sam Hancock (United Kingdom) Andrew Newall	Chevron B8	TSRC1		
2008	Plateau 4	(United Kingdom) Jo Bamford (United Kingdom) Alain de Cadenet	Ferrari 275 GTB	GTS12		
2008	Plateau 5	(United Kingdom) Jo Bamford (United Kingdom) Alain de Cadenet	Chevron B8	TSR16		
2010	Plateau 3	(United Kingdom) Bobby Verdon-Roe (United Kingdom) Harry Leventis	Ferrari 246 S	TSRC5		
2010	Plateau 4	(United Kingdom) Bobby Verdon-Roe (United Kingdom) Harry Leventis	Ferrari 206 Dino	TSRC1		
2010	Plateau 5	(United Kingdom) Bobby Verdon-Roe (United Kingdom) Harry Leventis	Ferrari P3	TSRC1		
2012	Plateau 3	(United Kingdom) Harry Leventis	Aston Martin DBR1	-	-	2nd
2022	Plateau 3	(United Kingdom) Patrick Blakeney-Edwards (United Kingdom) Christoff Cowens	Jaguar E-Type	GTS7B2		61st
2022	Plateau 4	(United Kingdom) Patrick Blakeney-Edwards	Shelby Cobra 289 Le Mans	GTS12C	7th	9th
2022	Endurance Racing Legends	-	Porsche 996 GT3R	GT2C	43rd	9th
2023	Benjafield Racing Club Special Class	(United Kingdom) Christoff Cowens	Bentley 4.5 Litre	-	-	28th
2023	Endurance Racing Legends	-	Dallara Judd V10	GT1B	3rd	4th
2025	Plateau 3	(United Kingdom) Christoff Cowens	Jaguar E-Type	GTS7B2	1st	18th
2025	Endurance Racing Legends	-	Dallara Judd V10	GT1B	4th	6th
2026	Plateau 9	-	Aston Martin DBR9	GT1B	1st	2nd
