= Lola B2K/10 =

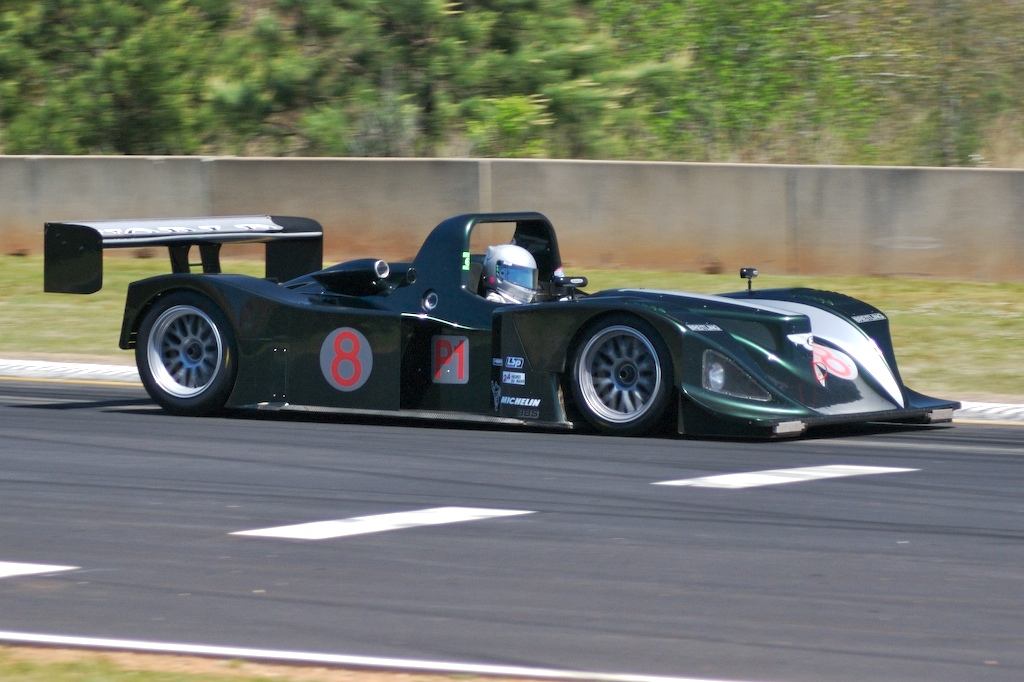
- Category: LMP900/SR1
- Constructor: Lola Cars International

Technical specifications
- Length: 4,640 mm (15 ft 3 in)
- Width: 1,990 mm (6 ft 6 in)
- Axle track: 1,660 mm (5 ft 5 in) front 1,580 mm (5 ft 2 in) rear
- Wheelbase: 2,800 mm (9 ft 2 in)
- Engine: Caterpillar TDI 4.9 L (300 cu in) twin-turbocharged V10 engine (Diesel); Judd GV4 4.0 L (240 cu in) N/A V10; Roush Racing-Ford 6.0 L (370 cu in) N/A V8; Porsche M96/70 3.6 L (220 cu in) twin-turbocharged Flat-6 mid-engined, longitudinally mounted
- Transmission: 6-speed sequential manual
- Weight: Appr. 900 kg (2,000 lb)
- Tyres: Michelin

Competition history
- Debut: 2000 12 Hours of Sebring
Races	Wins	Poles
75	5	2

The Lola B2K/10 was a Le Mans Prototype developed in 2000 by Lola Cars International for use in the 24 Hours of Le Mans, American Le Mans Series, Grand American Road Racing Championship, and Sports Racing World Cup. It was a replacement for the previous Lola B98/10 and shared some elements with its smaller variant, the Lola B2K/40.

== Development ==
More an evolution of the B98/10 than an all new car, the B2K/10 shared many design elements, most notably at the front end of the car. The unusual fenders and headlights remained, while the nose had been raised in order to accommodate a higher footbox. However, unlike other prototypes which usually had the nose come to a point to allow for an air intake, the B2K/10's nose merely stopped where the footbox ended, leaving a large vertical protrusion. Inside of this, a third headlight was mounted for better visibility in endurance races.

Part of the reasoning behind not creating an intake in the nose was due to the decision to draw all the cooling air for the car from underneath. However, this design suffered from problems due to ambient track temperature, a problem that had similarly plagued the BMW V12 LM in 1998. The large air intake mounted underneath the rollbar of the B98/10 could also be removed, although not all cars did this. If removed, the intakes were relocated to small nacelles to the side of the cockpit, allowing for a cleaner flow of air to the rear wing from underneath the rollbar.

The sides were radically changed, with large openings between the sidepod and cockpit allowing air over the nose to escape out the side of the car. The radiator intakes on the side, which were partially fed from the air channeled away from the nose, were also larger than those on the B98/10.

Lola remained with the same engine as the B98/10s, a Roush Racing-designed Ford 6.0 Litre V8. However, as before, a wide variety of other engines were chosen by teams for use, including the Judd GV4 V10 and a Porsche twin-turbocharged Flat-6.

== Racing history ==
In early 2000, the first three B2K/10s were delivered to customers, with Team Rafanelli receiving a Judd-powered chassis, Philip Creighton Motorsport a Ford-powered chassis, and Champion Racing a Porsche-powered chassis. While Creighton Motorsport's chassis was not quite ready, the other two teams made their debut at the 12 Hours of Sebring. However, neither car finished, with Champion suffering a suspension failure in the closing hours and Rafanelli dropping out early on.

While Rafanelli and Champion remained in the American Le Mans Series, they were later joined by Intersport Racing, who added a Judd-powered B2K/10 alongside their B98/10 for a two-car team. Rafanelli took the best result of the season, a third at Charlotte Motor Speedway. Creighton Motorsports went to the Grand American Road Racing Championship, scoring a best finish of second at Mid-Ohio Sports Car Course, although Intersport also took a second at Watkins Glen International during a brief appearance in the series.

Meanwhile, Konrad Motorsport purchased another chassis, keeping with a Ford powerplant, and ran the Sports Racing World Cup late in the season, replacing their B98/10. The car scored points in a single race at the Nürburgring, finishing third. Finally, for the 2000 24 Hours of Le Mans, Rafanelli and Konrad entered their chassis, yet neither car managed to finish.

For 2001, there were adjustments in the teams, with Intersport being the only one to remain in the same position as 2000, staying in the American Le Mans Series while running a select number of Grand American Road Racing Championship races. Champion Racing moved permanently to the GARRC, while Rafanelli bought a Ferrari 550 Maranello. Konrad Racing moved to concentrating on grand tourer racing, making only a select few appearances with their car. Philip Creighton Motorsport ran the 24 Hours of Daytona only before dropping out. This season, the B2K/10 scored its first victory in GARRC at Phoenix International Raceway for Intersport Racing, followed by a second win at Mid-Ohio Sports Car Course.

By 2002, the B2K/10's design flaws were leaving it farther behind the competition. Intersport continued in both the ALMS and GARRC running two chassis, while Pegasus Racing purchased Champion Racings Porsche-powered B2K/10 for GARRC. These were the only teams racing the B2K/10 for that season, with Intersport having a best result of second at Homestead-Miami Speedway for GARRC.

However, for 2003, the B2K/10 saw a resurgence. Intersport concentrated solely on the American Le Mans Series while newcomer Taurus Sports Racing entered the FIA Sportscar Championship with the former Rafanelli car, as well as select ALMS events. Taurus Sports Racing scored the best result of the year, a third at Autodromo Nazionale Monza.

In 2004 the B2K/10 saw its final competition. After a disappointing failure to finish at the 12 Hours of Sebring, Taurus Sports Racing set out to bring diesel technology back to the 24 Hours of Le Mans. Besides the normal Judd-powered B2K/10, Taurus added a second chassis powered by a Caterpillar-tuned Volkswagen twin turbocharged V10 engine. First attempting to run the opening Le Mans Endurance Series race at Monza, the team came to Le Mans believing that the diesel be a match for current competitors. However, the torque of the engine destroyed the diesel-powered B2K/10's gearbox after a mere 35 laps. The team's other, gasoline-powered B2K/10 finished the race, taking 20th place. Following one final appearance by the diesel-powered car at Silverstone Circuit which led to a failure, the final active B2K/10 was retired from competition.

The B2K/10 was partially replaced by the Lola B01/60 (MG-Lola EX257) in 2001 before being fully replaced by the Lola B06/10 in 2006.

== Chassis history ==
A total of six B2K/10s were constructed in 2000, running competitively until 2004.

#HU-01

- Team Rafanelli, Judd powerplant (2000)
- Taurus Sports Racing, Judd powerplant (2003)
- Taurus Sports Racing, Caterpillar powerplant (2004)
- Team Euroracing Judd powerplant (2008)

#HU-02

- Philip Creighton Motorsport, Ford powerplant (2000–2001)

#HU-03

- Champion Racing, Porsche powerplant (2000–2001)
- Pegasus Racing, Porsche powerplant (2001)

#HU-04

- Konrad Motorsport, Ford powerplant (2000–2001)

#HU-05

- Intersport Racing, Judd powerplant (2002–2003)
- Taurus Sports Racing, Judd powerplant (2004)
- Team Euroracing Ford Powerplant (2015)

#HU-06

- Intersport Racing, Judd powerplant (2000–2003)
- Team Euroracing Judd Powerplant
