= 2004 1000 km of Nürburgring =

Sports car endurance race in Germany

Nürburgring

The 2004 1000 km of Nürburgring was the second round of the 2004 Le Mans Series season, held at the Nürburgring, Germany. It was run on 3 July 2004, and was also considered to be the 66th running of the Eifelrennen.

== Official results ==
Class winners in bold. Cars failing to complete 70% of winner's distance marked as Not Classified (NC).

Pos	Class	No	Team	Drivers	Chassis	Tyre	Laps
Pos	Class	No	Team	Drivers	Engine	Tyre	Laps
1	**LMP1**	**8**	**(United Kingdom) Audi Sport UK Team Veloqx**	**(United Kingdom) Allan McNish (Switzerland) Pierre Kaffer**	**Audi R8**	MI	**180**
1	**LMP1**	**8**	**(United Kingdom) Audi Sport UK Team Veloqx**	**(United Kingdom) Allan McNish (Switzerland) Pierre Kaffer**	**Audi 3.6L Turbo V8**	MI	**180**
2	LMP1	88	(United Kingdom) Audi Sport UK Team Veloqx	(United Kingdom) Johnny Herbert (United Kingdom) Jamie Davies	Audi R8	MI	179
2	LMP1	88	(United Kingdom) Audi Sport UK Team Veloqx	(United Kingdom) Johnny Herbert (United Kingdom) Jamie Davies	Audi 3.6L Turbo V8	MI	179
3	LMP1	3	(United Kingdom) Creation Autosportif	(France) Nicolas Minassian (United Kingdom) Jamie Campbell-Walter	DBA 03S	D	179
3	LMP1	3	(United Kingdom) Creation Autosportif	(France) Nicolas Minassian (United Kingdom) Jamie Campbell-Walter	Zytek ZG348 3.4L V8	D	179
4	LMP1	5	(Japan) Team Goh	(Italy) Rinaldo Capello (Japan) Seiji Ara	Audi R8	MI	170
4	LMP1	5	(Japan) Team Goh	(Italy) Rinaldo Capello (Japan) Seiji Ara	Audi 3.6L Turbo V8	MI	170
5	LMP1	17	(France) Pescarolo Sport	(France) Soheil Ayari (France) Éric Hélary	Pescarolo C60	MI	170
5	LMP1	17	(France) Pescarolo Sport	(France) Soheil Ayari (France) Éric Hélary	Judd GV5 5.0L V10	MI	170
6	LMP1	6	(United Kingdom) Rollcentre Racing	(United Kingdom) Martin Short (United Kingdom) Patrick Pearce (Portugal) João Barbosa	Dallara SP1	D	168
6	LMP1	6	(United Kingdom) Rollcentre Racing	(United Kingdom) Martin Short (United Kingdom) Patrick Pearce (Portugal) João Barbosa	Judd GV4 4.0L V10	D	168
7	LMP1	7	(United Kingdom) RML	(United Kingdom) Mike Newton (Brazil) Thomas Erdos (Portugal) Miguel Ramos	MG-Lola EX257	D	167
7	LMP1	7	(United Kingdom) RML	(United Kingdom) Mike Newton (Brazil) Thomas Erdos (Portugal) Miguel Ramos	MG (AER) XP20 2.0L Turbo I4	D	167
8	**GTS**	**86**	**(France) Larbre Compétition**	**(France) Christophe Bouchut (Portugal) Pedro Lamy (Switzerland) Steve Zacchia**	**Ferrari 550-GTS Maranello**	MI	**165**
8	**GTS**	**86**	**(France) Larbre Compétition**	**(France) Christophe Bouchut (Portugal) Pedro Lamy (Switzerland) Steve Zacchia**	**Ferrari 5.9L V12**	MI	**165**
9	GTS	59	(Germany) Vitaphone Racing (Germany) Konrad Motorsport	(Germany) Uwe Alzen (Germany) Michael Bartels (Austria) Franz Konrad	Saleen S7-R	P	165
9	GTS	59	(Germany) Vitaphone Racing (Germany) Konrad Motorsport	(Germany) Uwe Alzen (Germany) Michael Bartels (Austria) Franz Konrad	Ford 6.9L V8	P	165
10	GTS	52	(United Kingdom) Graham Nash Motorsport	(Italy) Gian Maria Gabbiani (United Kingdom) Phillip Bennett	Saleen S7-R	D	162
10	GTS	52	(United Kingdom) Graham Nash Motorsport	(Italy) Gian Maria Gabbiani (United Kingdom) Phillip Bennett	Ford 6.9L V8	D	162
11	GTS	61	(Netherlands) Barron Connor Racing	(Italy) Thomas Biagi (United States) Danny Sullivan (Netherlands) John Bosch	Ferrari 575-GTC Maranello	P	161
11	GTS	61	(Netherlands) Barron Connor Racing	(Italy) Thomas Biagi (United States) Danny Sullivan (Netherlands) John Bosch	Ferrari 6.0L V12	P	161
12	**GT**	**93**	**(United Kingdom) Cirtek Motorsport**	**(United Kingdom) Adam Jones (Germany) Sascha Maassen**	**Porsche 911 GT3-RSR**	D	**161**
12	**GT**	**93**	**(United Kingdom) Cirtek Motorsport**	**(United Kingdom) Adam Jones (Germany) Sascha Maassen**	**Porsche 3.6L Flat-6**	D	**161**
13	GT	85	(Germany) Freisinger Motorsport	(France) Emmanuel Collard (France) Stéphane Ortelli (Russia) Alexey Vasilyev	Porsche 911 GT3-RSR	D	161
13	GT	85	(Germany) Freisinger Motorsport	(France) Emmanuel Collard (France) Stéphane Ortelli (Russia) Alexey Vasilyev	Porsche 3.6L Flat-6	D	161
14	GT	80	(United Kingdom) Sebah Automotive	(France) Xavier Pompidou (United Kingdom) Marino Franchitti	Porsche 911 GT3-R	D	158
14	GT	80	(United Kingdom) Sebah Automotive	(France) Xavier Pompidou (United Kingdom) Marino Franchitti	Porsche 3.6L Flat-6	D	158
15	GT	77	(Japan) Choro-Q Racing Team	(Japan) Kazuyuki Nishizawa (Japan) Haruki Kurosawa (Japan) Manabu Orido	Porsche 911 GT3-RSR	Y	157
15	GT	77	(Japan) Choro-Q Racing Team	(Japan) Kazuyuki Nishizawa (Japan) Haruki Kurosawa (Japan) Manabu Orido	Porsche 3.6L Flat-6	Y	157
16	**LMP2**	**13**	**(France) Courage Compétition**	**(France) Jean-Marc Gounon (Switzerland) Alexander Frei (United Kingdom) Sam Hancock**	**Courage C65**	MI	**154**
16	**LMP2**	**13**	**(France) Courage Compétition**	**(France) Jean-Marc Gounon (Switzerland) Alexander Frei (United Kingdom) Sam Hancock**	**MG (AER) XP20 2.0L Turbo I4**	MI	**154**
17	GT	84	(Germany) Seikel Motorsport	(United States) Philip Collin (France) Gaël Lasoudier (Germany) Arno Klasen	Porsche 911 GT3-RS	Y	153
17	GT	84	(Germany) Seikel Motorsport	(United States) Philip Collin (France) Gaël Lasoudier (Germany) Arno Klasen	Porsche 3.6L Flat-6	Y	153
18	GT	97	(France) Auto Palace	(France) Steeve Hiesse (Italy) Giovanni Lavaggi	Ferrari 360 Modena GT	P	152
18	GT	97	(France) Auto Palace	(France) Steeve Hiesse (Italy) Giovanni Lavaggi	Ferrari 3.6L V8	P	152
19	LMP2	99	(France) PiR Competition	(France) Pierre Bruneau (France) Marc Rostan	Pilbeam MP91	MI	151
19	LMP2	99	(France) PiR Competition	(France) Pierre Bruneau (France) Marc Rostan	JPX (Mader) 3.4L V6	MI	151
20	GTS	62	(Netherlands) Barron Connor Racing	(Netherlands) Mike Hezemans (Switzerland) Jean-Denis Délétraz	Ferrari 575-GTC Maranello	P	150
20	GTS	62	(Netherlands) Barron Connor Racing	(Netherlands) Mike Hezemans (Switzerland) Jean-Denis Délétraz	Ferrari 6.0L V12	P	150
21	GT	70	(Monaco) JMB Racing	(Russia) Roman Rusinov (France) Stéphane Daoudi	Ferrari 360 Modena GT	D	149
21	GT	70	(Monaco) JMB Racing	(Russia) Roman Rusinov (France) Stéphane Daoudi	Ferrari 3.6L V8	D	149
22	GT	92	(United Kingdom) Cirtek Motorsport	(United Kingdom) Frank Mountain (New Zealand) Rob Wilson (Saudi Arabia) Karim Ojjeh	Ferrari 360 Modena GTC	D	147
22	GT	92	(United Kingdom) Cirtek Motorsport	(United Kingdom) Frank Mountain (New Zealand) Rob Wilson (Saudi Arabia) Karim Ojjeh	Ferrari 3.6L V8	D	147
23	GT	91	(United Kingdom) Racesport Salisbury	(United Kingdom) John Hartshorne (United Kingdom) Graeme Mundy (United Kingdom) Richard Stanton	TVR Tuscan T400R	D	144
23	GT	91	(United Kingdom) Racesport Salisbury	(United Kingdom) John Hartshorne (United Kingdom) Graeme Mundy (United Kingdom) Richard Stanton	TVR Speed Six 4.0L I6	D	144
24	GT	82	(France) Denis Cohignac	(France) Thierry Stépec (France) Sylvain Noël (France) André-Alain Corbel	Porsche 911 GT3-R	D	144
24	GT	82	(France) Denis Cohignac	(France) Thierry Stépec (France) Sylvain Noël (France) André-Alain Corbel	Porsche 3.6L Flat-6	D	144
25	LMP1	69	(United Kingdom) Team Jota	(United Kingdom) John Stack (United Kingdom) Sam Hignett (Italy) Gianni Collini	Zytek 04S	D	143
25	LMP1	69	(United Kingdom) Team Jota	(United Kingdom) John Stack (United Kingdom) Sam Hignett (Italy) Gianni Collini	Zytek ZG348 3.4L V8	D	143
26	LMP2	27	(United Kingdom) Tracsport	(United Kingdom) John Ingram (United Kingdom) John Gaw (United Kingdom) Rick Pearson	Lola B2K/40	D	139
26	LMP2	27	(United Kingdom) Tracsport	(United Kingdom) John Ingram (United Kingdom) John Gaw (United Kingdom) Rick Pearson	Nissan (AER) VQL 3.0L V6	D	139
27	LMP2	35	(Belgium) G-Force Racing	(Belgium) Frank Hahn (France) Jean-François Leroch (France) Philippe Haezebrouck	Pilbeam MP84	D	135
27	LMP2	35	(Belgium) G-Force Racing	(Belgium) Frank Hahn (France) Jean-François Leroch (France) Philippe Haezebrouck	Nissan (AER) VQL 3.0L V6	D	135
28	GT	79	(France) Perspective Racing	(United Kingdom) Ian Khan (Belgium) Michel Haydens	Porsche 911 GT3-R	D	134
28	GT	79	(France) Perspective Racing	(United Kingdom) Ian Khan (Belgium) Michel Haydens	Porsche 3.6L Flat-6	D	134
29	GT	71	(United Kingdom) JWR Mike Jordan	(United Kingdom) Mike Jordan (United Kingdom) Robin Liddell	Porsche 911 GT3-RSR	D	133
29	GT	71	(United Kingdom) JWR Mike Jordan	(United Kingdom) Mike Jordan (United Kingdom) Robin Liddell	Porsche 3.6L Flat-6	D	133
30	GT	90	(Germany) T2M Motorsport	(Belgium) Vanina Ickx (United Kingdom) Paul Daniels (France) Thierry Rabineau	Porsche 911 GT3-RS	Y	126
30	GT	90	(Germany) T2M Motorsport	(Belgium) Vanina Ickx (United Kingdom) Paul Daniels (France) Thierry Rabineau	Porsche 3.6L Flat-6	Y	126
31 DSQ^{†}	LMP2	36	(France) Gerard Welter	(France) Jean-René de Fournoux (France) Jean-Bernard Bouvet	WR LMP2	MI	155
31 DSQ^{†}	LMP2	36	(France) Gerard Welter	(France) Jean-René de Fournoux (France) Jean-Bernard Bouvet	Peugeot 3.4L V6	MI	155
32 DNF	LMP2	28	(Italy) Team Ranieri Randaccio	(Italy) Ranieri Randaccio (Italy) Leonardo Maddalena	Tampolli RTA99	G	114
32 DNF	LMP2	28	(Italy) Team Ranieri Randaccio	(Italy) Ranieri Randaccio (Italy) Leonardo Maddalena	Ford (Nicholson-McLaren) 3.3L V8	G	114
33 DNF	LMP2	26	(France) Paul Belmondo Racing	(France) Paul Belmondo (France) Claude-Yves Gosselin (France) Marco Saviozzi	Courage C65	MI	98
33 DNF	LMP2	26	(France) Paul Belmondo Racing	(France) Paul Belmondo (France) Claude-Yves Gosselin (France) Marco Saviozzi	MG (AER) XP20 2.0L Turbo I4	MI	98
34 DNF	LMP1	20	(United Kingdom) Lister Cars	(United Kingdom) Justin Keen (Denmark) John Nielsen	Lister Storm LMP	D	62
34 DNF	LMP1	20	(United Kingdom) Lister Cars	(United Kingdom) Justin Keen (Denmark) John Nielsen	Chevrolet LS1 6.0L V8	D	62
35 DNF	LMP2	31	(Switzerland) Équipe Palmyr	(Switzerland) Christophe Ricard (Switzerland) Philippe Favre (France) Grégory Fargier	Lucchini SR2000	A	61
35 DNF	LMP2	31	(Switzerland) Équipe Palmyr	(Switzerland) Christophe Ricard (Switzerland) Philippe Favre (France) Grégory Fargier	Alfa Romeo 3.0L V6	A	61
36 DNF	GTS	51	(Italy) MAC Racing (Italy) Scuderia Veregra	(Italy) Massimo Morini (Italy) Maurizio Strada (Italy) "Base Up"	Chrysler Viper GTS-R	G	60
36 DNF	GTS	51	(Italy) MAC Racing (Italy) Scuderia Veregra	(Italy) Massimo Morini (Italy) Maurizio Strada (Italy) "Base Up"	Chrysler 8.0L V10	G	60
37 DNF	GT	81	(Germany) Farnbacher Racing	(Germany) Mike Rockenfeller (Denmark) Thorkild Thyrring (Denmark) Lars-Erik Nielsen	Porsche 911 GT3-RSR	D	54
37 DNF	GT	81	(Germany) Farnbacher Racing	(Germany) Mike Rockenfeller (Denmark) Thorkild Thyrring (Denmark) Lars-Erik Nielsen	Porsche 3.6L Flat-6	D	54
38 DNF	GTS	53	(Germany) Konrad Motorsport	(Germany) Klaus Abbelen (Poland) Maciej Stanco (United Kingdom) Paul Knapfield	Saleen S7-R	P	31
38 DNF	GTS	53	(Germany) Konrad Motorsport	(Germany) Klaus Abbelen (Poland) Maciej Stanco (United Kingdom) Paul Knapfield	Ford 6.9L V8	P	31
39 DNF	GTS	60	(France) Force One Racing	(France) David Hallyday (France) Bruno Besson (Belgium) Anthony Kumpen	Chrysler Viper GTS-R	P	20
39 DNF	GTS	60	(France) Force One Racing	(France) David Hallyday (France) Bruno Besson (Belgium) Anthony Kumpen	Chrysler 8.0L V10	P	20
DNS	LMP2	33	(Austria) Renauer Motorsport	(Austria) Manfred Jurasz (Austria) Hannes Gsell (Czech Republic) Petr Válek	Tampolli RTA99	D	–
DNS	LMP2	33	(Austria) Renauer Motorsport	(Austria) Manfred Jurasz (Austria) Hannes Gsell (Czech Republic) Petr Válek	Alfa Romeo 3.0L V6	D	–
DNS	GTS	50	(Germany) A-Level Engineering	(Germany) Wolfgang Kaufmann (Belgium) Eric van de Poele	Porsche 911 Bi-Turbo	MI	–
DNS	GTS	50	(Germany) A-Level Engineering	(Germany) Wolfgang Kaufmann (Belgium) Eric van de Poele	Porsche 3.6L Turbo Flat-6	MI	–

† – #36 Gerard Welter was disqualified in post-race inspection for having an illegal airbox fitted to the car.

== Statistics ==
- Pole Position – #3 Creation Autosportif – 1:46.681
- Average Speed – 153.877 km/h

Le Mans Series
Previous race: 2004 1000km of Monza	2004 season	Next race: 2004 1000km of Silverstone
