= 2004 1000 km of Monza =

Layout of the Autodromo Nazionale Monza

The 2004 1000 km of Monza was the first round of the 2004 Le Mans Series season, held at the Autodromo Nazionale Monza, Italy. It was run on May 9, 2004.

Although proceeded by the 2003 1000km of Le Mans exhibition event, the 1000 km of Monza was the first official race of the new Le Mans Endurance Series.

== Official results ==
Class winners in bold. Cars failing to complete 70% of winner's distance marked as Not Classified (NC).

Pos	Class	No	Team	Drivers	Chassis	Tyre	Laps
Pos	Class	No	Team	Drivers	Engine	Tyre	Laps
1	**LMP1**	**88**	**(United Kingdom) Audi Sport UK Team Veloqx**	**(United Kingdom) Johnny Herbert (United Kingdom) Jamie Davies**	**Audi R8**	MI	**173**
1	**LMP1**	**88**	**(United Kingdom) Audi Sport UK Team Veloqx**	**(United Kingdom) Johnny Herbert (United Kingdom) Jamie Davies**	**Audi 3.6L Turbo V8**	MI	**173**
2	LMP1	8	(United Kingdom) Audi Sport UK Team Veloqx	(United Kingdom) Allan McNish (Switzerland) Pierre Kaffer	Audi R8	MI	173
2	LMP1	8	(United Kingdom) Audi Sport UK Team Veloqx	(United Kingdom) Allan McNish (Switzerland) Pierre Kaffer	Audi 3.6L Turbo V8	MI	173
3	LMP1	5	(Japan) Team Goh	(Italy) Rinaldo Capello (Denmark) Tom Kristensen (Japan) Seiji Ara	Audi R8	MI	172
3	LMP1	5	(Japan) Team Goh	(Italy) Rinaldo Capello (Denmark) Tom Kristensen (Japan) Seiji Ara	Audi 3.6L Turbo V8	MI	172
4	LMP1	17	(France) Pescarolo Sport	(France) Emmanuel Collard (France) Soheil Ayari	Pescarolo C60	MI	169
4	LMP1	17	(France) Pescarolo Sport	(France) Emmanuel Collard (France) Soheil Ayari	Judd GV5 5.0L V10	MI	169
5	LMP1	6	(United Kingdom) Rollcentre Racing	(United Kingdom) Martin Short (United Kingdom) Rob Barff (Portugal) João Barbosa	Dallara SP1	D	168
5	LMP1	6	(United Kingdom) Rollcentre Racing	(United Kingdom) Martin Short (United Kingdom) Rob Barff (Portugal) João Barbosa	Judd GV4 4.0L V10	D	168
6	LMP1	22	(United Kingdom) Zytek Engineering	(United Kingdom) Andy Wallace (Australia) David Brabham (Sweden) Stefan Johansson	Zytek 04S	MI	165
6	LMP1	22	(United Kingdom) Zytek Engineering	(United Kingdom) Andy Wallace (Australia) David Brabham (Sweden) Stefan Johansson	Zytek ZG348 3.4L V8	MI	165
7	LMP1	7	(United Kingdom) RML	(United Kingdom) Mike Newton (Brazil) Thomas Erdos (Portugal) Miguel Ramos	MG-Lola EX257	D	161
7	LMP1	7	(United Kingdom) RML	(United Kingdom) Mike Newton (Brazil) Thomas Erdos (Portugal) Miguel Ramos	MG (AER) XP20 2.0L Turbo I4	D	161
8	LMP1	14	(United Kingdom) Team Nasamax	(Canada) Robbie Stirling (South Africa) Werner Lupberger	Nasamax DM139 (Reynard)	D	158
8	LMP1	14	(United Kingdom) Team Nasamax	(Canada) Robbie Stirling (South Africa) Werner Lupberger	Judd GV5 5.0L V10 (Bio-ethanol)	D	158
9	**GTS**	**86**	**(France) Larbre Compétition**	**(France) Christophe Bouchut (Portugal) Pedro Lamy (Switzerland) Steve Zacchia**	**Ferrari 550-GTS Maranello**	MI	**154**
9	**GTS**	**86**	**(France) Larbre Compétition**	**(France) Christophe Bouchut (Portugal) Pedro Lamy (Switzerland) Steve Zacchia**	**Ferrari 5.9L V12**	MI	**154**
10	GTS	61	(Netherlands) Barron Connor Racing	(Italy) Thomas Biagi (United States) Danny Sullivan (Netherlands) John Bosch	Ferrari 575-GTC Maranello	P	151
10	GTS	61	(Netherlands) Barron Connor Racing	(Italy) Thomas Biagi (United States) Danny Sullivan (Netherlands) John Bosch	Ferrari 6.0L V12	P	151
11	**GT**	**85**	**(Germany) Freisinger Motorsport**	**(France) Romain Dumas (France) Stéphane Ortelli**	**Porsche 911 GT3-RSR**	D	**151**
11	**GT**	**85**	**(Germany) Freisinger Motorsport**	**(France) Romain Dumas (France) Stéphane Ortelli**	**Porsche 3.6L Flat-6**	D	**151**
12	GT	70	(Monaco) JMB Racing	(France) Stéphane Daoudi (Brazil) Jaime Melo (Russia) Roman Rusinov	Ferrari 360 Modena GT	D	151
12	GT	70	(Monaco) JMB Racing	(France) Stéphane Daoudi (Brazil) Jaime Melo (Russia) Roman Rusinov	Ferrari 3.6L V8	D	151
13	GT	77	(Japan) Choro-Q Racing Team	(Japan) Haruki Kurosawa (Japan) Kazuyuki Nishizawa (Japan) Manabu Orido	Porsche 911 GT3-RSR	Y	148
13	GT	77	(Japan) Choro-Q Racing Team	(Japan) Haruki Kurosawa (Japan) Kazuyuki Nishizawa (Japan) Manabu Orido	Porsche 3.6L Flat-6	Y	148
14	GT	81	(United States) The Racer's Group	(United States) Patrick Long (Denmark) Lars-Erik Nielsen (Denmark) Thorkild Thyrring	Porsche 911 GT3-RSR	D	146
14	GT	81	(United States) The Racer's Group	(United States) Patrick Long (Denmark) Lars-Erik Nielsen (Denmark) Thorkild Thyrring	Porsche 3.6L Flat-6	D	146
15	GT	80	(United Kingdom) Sebah Automotive	(United Kingdom) Piers Masarati (United Kingdom) Bart Hayden	Porsche 911 GT3-R	D	145
15	GT	80	(United Kingdom) Sebah Automotive	(United Kingdom) Piers Masarati (United Kingdom) Bart Hayden	Porsche 3.6L Flat-6	D	145
16	GT	93	(United Kingdom) Cirtek Motorsport	(United Kingdom) Adam Jones (Germany) Sascha Maassen	Porsche 911 GT3-RSR	D	145
16	GT	93	(United Kingdom) Cirtek Motorsport	(United Kingdom) Adam Jones (Germany) Sascha Maassen	Porsche 3.6L Flat-6	D	145
17	GT	92	(United Kingdom) Cirtek Motorsport	(United Kingdom) Frank Mountain (New Zealand) Rob Wilson (Netherlands) Hans Hugenholtz	Ferrari 360 Modena GTC	D	141
17	GT	92	(United Kingdom) Cirtek Motorsport	(United Kingdom) Frank Mountain (New Zealand) Rob Wilson (Netherlands) Hans Hugenholtz	Ferrari 3.6L V8	D	141
18	**LMP2**	**99**	**(France) PIR Competition**	**(France) Pierre Bruneau (France) Marc Rostan**	**Pilbeam MP91**	MI	**131**
18	**LMP2**	**99**	**(France) PIR Competition**	**(France) Pierre Bruneau (France) Marc Rostan**	**JPX (Mader) 3.4L V6**	MI	**131**
19	GT	84	(Germany) Seikel Motorsport	(United States) Philip Collin (Canada) Tony Burgess	Porsche 911 GT3-RS	Y	123
19	GT	84	(Germany) Seikel Motorsport	(United States) Philip Collin (Canada) Tony Burgess	Porsche 3.6L Flat-6	Y	123
20 NC	GTS	52	(United Kingdom) Graham Nash Motorsport	(Italy) Ettore Bonaldi (Italy) Gian Maria Gabbiani (France) Michel Orts	Saleen S7-R	D	119
20 NC	GTS	52	(United Kingdom) Graham Nash Motorsport	(Italy) Ettore Bonaldi (Italy) Gian Maria Gabbiani (France) Michel Orts	Ford 6.9L V8	D	119
21 NC	GT	91	(United Kingdom) Racesport Salisbury	(United Kingdom) Richard Stanton (United Kingdom) Graeme Mundy (United Kingdom) John Hartshorne	TVR Tuscan T400R	D	101
21 NC	GT	91	(United Kingdom) Racesport Salisbury	(United Kingdom) Richard Stanton (United Kingdom) Graeme Mundy (United Kingdom) John Hartshorne	TVR 4.0L I6	D	101
22 DNF	LMP1	3	(United Kingdom) Creation Autosportif	(France) Nicolas Minassian (United Kingdom) Jamie Campbell-Walter	DBA 03S	D	146
22 DNF	LMP1	3	(United Kingdom) Creation Autosportif	(France) Nicolas Minassian (United Kingdom) Jamie Campbell-Walter	Zytek ZG348 3.4L V8	D	146
23 DNF	LMP2	28	(Italy) Team Ranieri Randaccio	(Italy) Ranieri Randaccio (Italy) Leonardo Maddalena	Tampolli RTA99	G	130
23 DNF	LMP2	28	(Italy) Team Ranieri Randaccio	(Italy) Ranieri Randaccio (Italy) Leonardo Maddalena	Ford (Nicholson-McLaren) 3.3L V8	G	130
24 DNF	GT	79	(France) Perspective Racing	(United Kingdom) Ian Khan (United Kingdom) Nigel Smith (Netherlands) Peter Kox	Porsche 911 GT3-R	D	130
24 DNF	GT	79	(France) Perspective Racing	(United Kingdom) Ian Khan (United Kingdom) Nigel Smith (Netherlands) Peter Kox	Porsche 3.6L Flat-6	D	130
25 DNF	GTS	59	(Germany) Vitaphone Racing (Germany) Konrad Motorsport	(Germany) Uwe Alzen (Germany) Michael Bartels (Austria) Franz Konrad	Saleen S7-R	P	119
25 DNF	GTS	59	(Germany) Vitaphone Racing (Germany) Konrad Motorsport	(Germany) Uwe Alzen (Germany) Michael Bartels (Austria) Franz Konrad	Ford 6.9L V8	P	119
26 DNF	GT	83	(Germany) Seikel Motorsport	(Italy) Luca Riccitelli (Italy) Alex Caffi (Italy) Gabrio Rosa	Porsche 911 GT3-RS	Y	104
26 DNF	GT	83	(Germany) Seikel Motorsport	(Italy) Luca Riccitelli (Italy) Alex Caffi (Italy) Gabrio Rosa	Porsche 3.6L Flat-6	Y	104
27 DNF	GTS	62	(Netherlands) Barron Connor Racing	(Netherlands) Mike Hezemans (France) Ange Barde (Switzerland) Jean-Denis Délétraz	Ferrari 575-GTC Maranello	P	93
27 DNF	GTS	62	(Netherlands) Barron Connor Racing	(Netherlands) Mike Hezemans (France) Ange Barde (Switzerland) Jean-Denis Délétraz	Ferrari 6.0L V12	P	93
28 DNF	GT	82	(France) Denis Cohignac	(France) Denis Cohignac (France) Sylvain Noël (France) Daniel Desbrueres	Porsche 911 GT3-R	D	70
28 DNF	GT	82	(France) Denis Cohignac	(France) Denis Cohignac (France) Sylvain Noël (France) Daniel Desbrueres	Porsche 3.6L Flat-6	D	70
29 DNF	LMP2	26	(France) Paul Belmondo Racing	(France) Paul Belmondo (France) Claude-Yves Gosselin (France) Marco Saviozzi	Courage C65	MI	54
29 DNF	LMP2	26	(France) Paul Belmondo Racing	(France) Paul Belmondo (France) Claude-Yves Gosselin (France) Marco Saviozzi	MG (AER) XP20 2.0L Turbo I4	MI	54
30 DNF	LMP1	69	(United Kingdom) Team Jota	(United Kingdom) John Stack (United Kingdom) Sam Hignett (Italy) Gianni Collini	Zytek 04S	D	43
30 DNF	LMP1	69	(United Kingdom) Team Jota	(United Kingdom) John Stack (United Kingdom) Sam Hignett (Italy) Gianni Collini	Zytek ZG348 3.4L V8	D	43
31 DNF	GT	76	(Italy) Autorlando Sport	(Italy) Franco Groppi (Italy) Giampaolo Tenchini (Switzerland) Joël Camathias	Porsche 911 GT3-RSR	P	47
31 DNF	GT	76	(Italy) Autorlando Sport	(Italy) Franco Groppi (Italy) Giampaolo Tenchini (Switzerland) Joël Camathias	Porsche 3.6L Flat-6	P	47
32 DNF	LMP2	32	(United States) Intersport Racing	(United States) Clint Field (United States) Jon Field (United States) William Binnie	Lola B2K/40	P	43
32 DNF	LMP2	32	(United States) Intersport Racing	(United States) Clint Field (United States) Jon Field (United States) William Binnie	Judd KV675 3.4L V8	P	43
33 DNF	GT	89	(United Kingdom) Chamberlain-Synergy Motorsport	(United Kingdom) Christopher Stockton (United Kingdom) Bob Berridge (United Kingdom) Michael Caine	TVR Tuscan T400R	D	42
33 DNF	GT	89	(United Kingdom) Chamberlain-Synergy Motorsport	(United Kingdom) Christopher Stockton (United Kingdom) Bob Berridge (United Kingdom) Michael Caine	TVR 4.0L I6	D	42
34 DNF	GT	97	(France) Auto Palace	(France) Steeve Hiesse (Italy) Giovanni Lavaggi (Italy) Giampaolo Ermolli	Ferrari 360 Modena GT	P	37
34 DNF	GT	97	(France) Auto Palace	(France) Steeve Hiesse (Italy) Giovanni Lavaggi (Italy) Giampaolo Ermolli	Ferrari 3.6L V8	P	37
35 DNF	GTS	51	(Italy) MAC Racing (Italy) Scuderia Veregra	(Italy) Maurizio Strada (Italy) Massimo Morini (Italy) "Base Up"	Chrysler Viper GTS-R	P	14
35 DNF	GTS	51	(Italy) MAC Racing (Italy) Scuderia Veregra	(Italy) Maurizio Strada (Italy) Massimo Morini (Italy) "Base Up"	Chrysler 8.0L V10	P	14
36 DNF	LMP1	9	(Japan) Advan Kondo Racing	(Japan) Hiroki Katoh (Japan) Ryo Michigami	Dome S101	Y	8
36 DNF	LMP1	9	(Japan) Advan Kondo Racing	(Japan) Hiroki Katoh (Japan) Ryo Michigami	Mugen MF408S 4.0L V8	Y	8
37 DNF	GT	90	(Germany) T2M Motorsport	(Germany) Wolfgang Kaufmann (Belgium) Vanina Ickx (Japan) Keiko Ihara	Porsche 911 GT3-RS	Y	4
37 DNF	GT	90	(Germany) T2M Motorsport	(Germany) Wolfgang Kaufmann (Belgium) Vanina Ickx (Japan) Keiko Ihara	Porsche 3.6L Flat-6	Y	4
38 DNF	GTS	60	(France) Force One Racing	(France) David Hallyday (France) Bruno Besson	Chrysler Viper GTS-R	P	1
38 DNF	GTS	60	(France) Force One Racing	(France) David Hallyday (France) Bruno Besson	Chrysler 8.0L V10	P	1
DNS	LMP1	4	(United Kingdom) Taurus Sports	(United Kingdom) Christian Vann (Switzerland) Benjamin Leuenberger (Germany) Alex Müller	Lola B2K/10	D	-
DNS	LMP1	4	(United Kingdom) Taurus Sports	(United Kingdom) Christian Vann (Switzerland) Benjamin Leuenberger (Germany) Alex Müller	Judd GV4 4.0L V10	D	-
DNS	LMP1	10	(United Kingdom) Taurus Sports	(United Kingdom) Calum Locke (United Kingdom) Phil Andrews	Lola B2K/10	D	-
DNS	LMP1	10	(United Kingdom) Taurus Sports	(United Kingdom) Calum Locke (United Kingdom) Phil Andrews	Caterpillar 5.0L Turbo V10 (Diesel)	D	-
DNS	LMP1	24	(Italy) Spinnaker Clandesteam	(Italy) Rocky Agusta (Bolivia) Felipe Ortiz (Italy) Beppe Gabbiani	Dallara SP1	MI	-
DNS	LMP1	24	(Italy) Spinnaker Clandesteam	(Italy) Rocky Agusta (Bolivia) Felipe Ortiz (Italy) Beppe Gabbiani	Judd GV4 4.0L V10	MI	-

== Statistics ==
- Pole Position - #88 Audi Sport UK Team Veloqx - 1:38.461
- Fastest Lap - #22 Zytek Engineering - 1:38.363
- Average Speed - 196.592 km/h

Le Mans Series
Previous race: None	2004 season	Next race: 2004 1000km of Nürburgring
