= Pilbeam MP91 =

Sports prototype race car

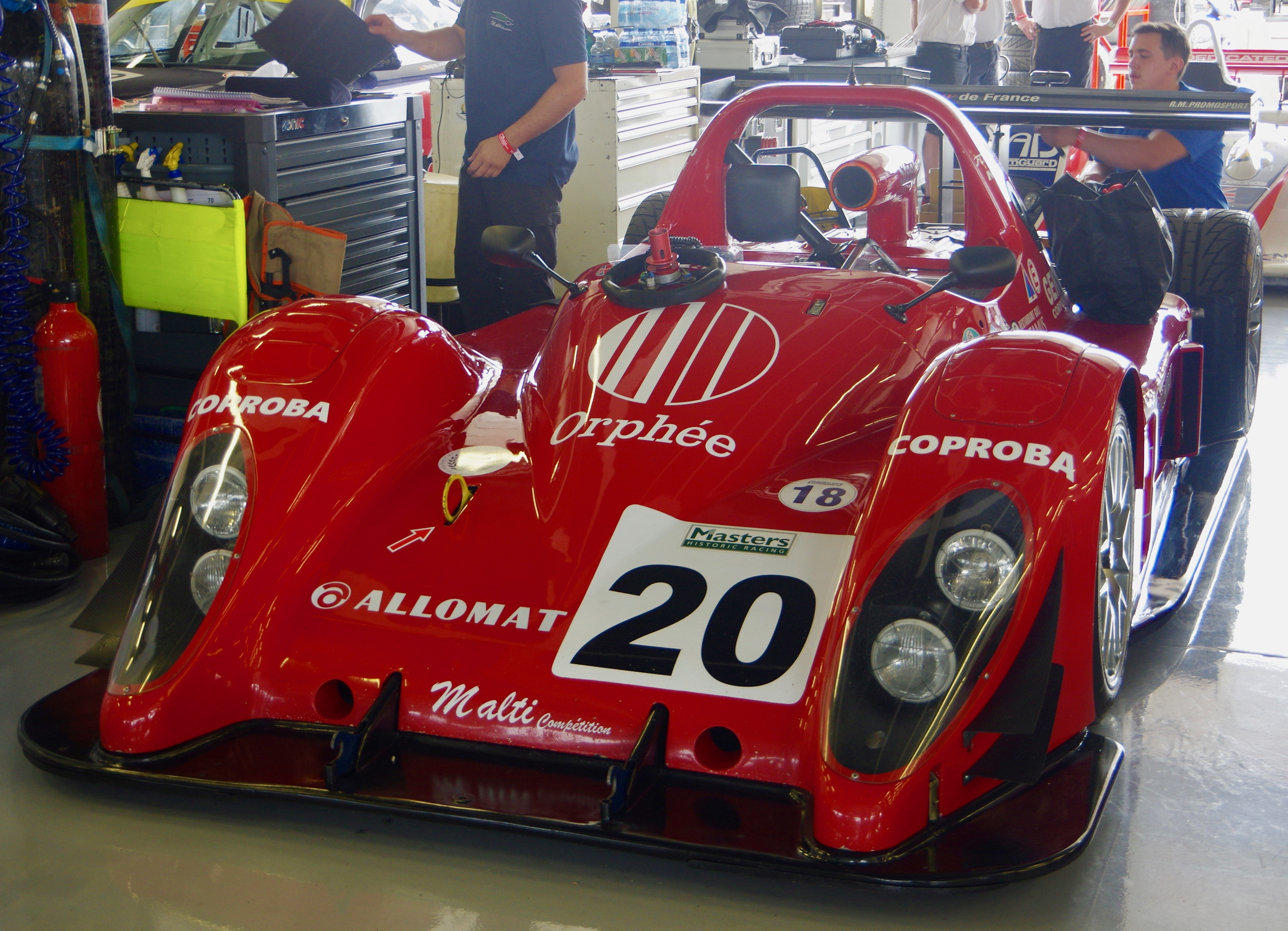
- Category: LMP675/LMP2
- Designer: Mike Pilbeam
- Predecessor: Pilbeam MP84
- Successor: Pilbeam MP93

Technical specifications
- Chassis: Carbon fiber and aluminum honeycomb monocoque chassis, steel roll hoop
- Suspension: Unequal length wishbones, pushrod actuated coil springs over shock absorbers, inboard rocker arms
- Length: 4,455 mm (175.4 in)
- Width: 1,900 mm (75 in)
- Axle track: 1,500 mm (59 in) (front); 1,600 mm (63 in) (rear)
- Wheelbase: 2,550 mm (100 in)
- Engine: JPX Mader Willman 6 3.4 L (207.5 cu in) 120° DOHC V6 naturally-aspirated mid-engined Judd XV675 3.4 L (207.5 cu in) 90° DOHC V8 naturally-aspirated mid-engined
- Transmission: Hewland NMT 6-speed sequential
- Power: 520–580 hp (390–430 kW)
- Weight: 690 kg (1,520 lb)

Competition history
- Debut: 2003 12 Hours of Sebring

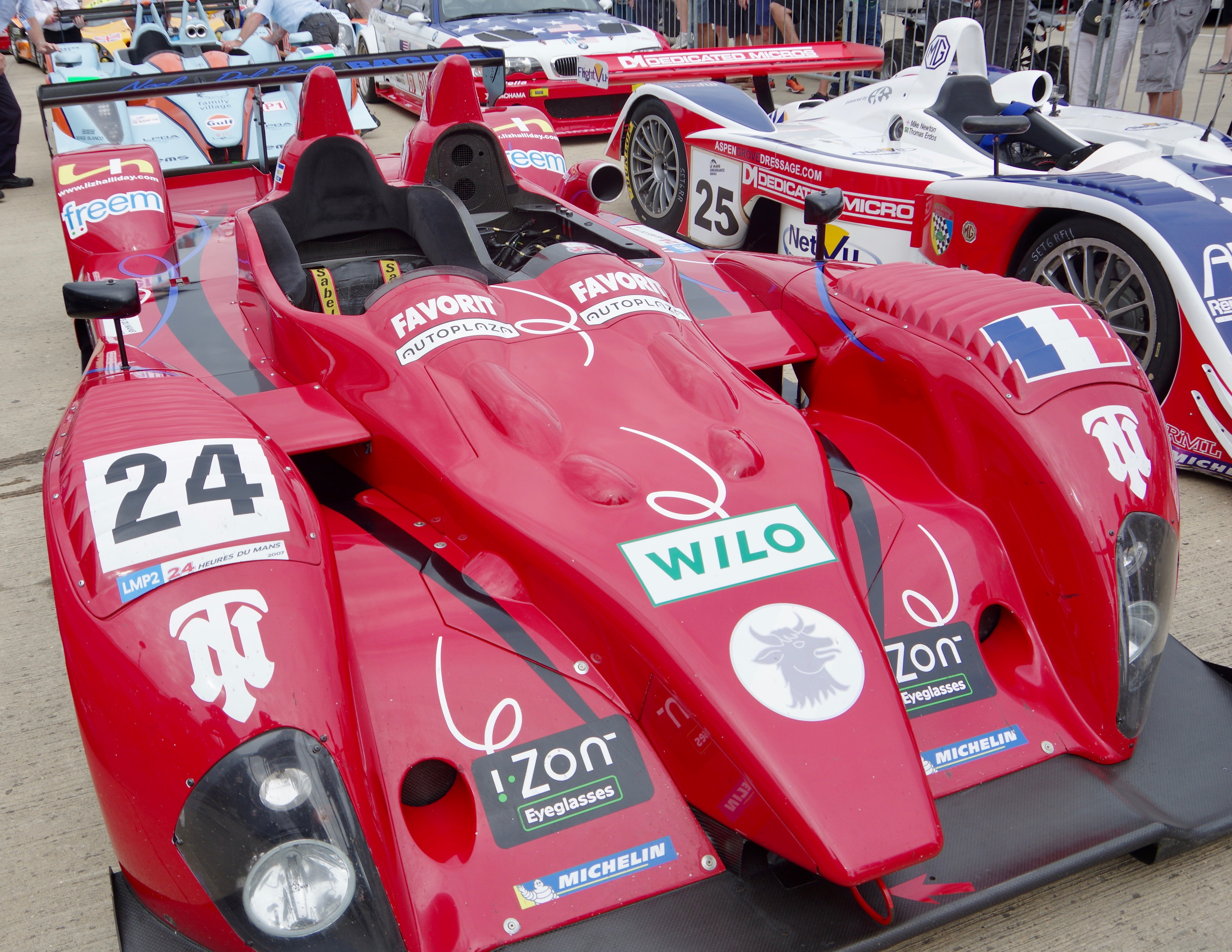
MP91 variation

The Pilbeam MP91 is a sports prototype race car, designed, developed and built by British manufacturer Pilbeam, for sports car racing, conforming to LMP675 (later LMP2) class rules and regulations, and produced between 2003 and 2005. It is an evolution of the previous MP84.
