= Sam Hancock =

British racing driver

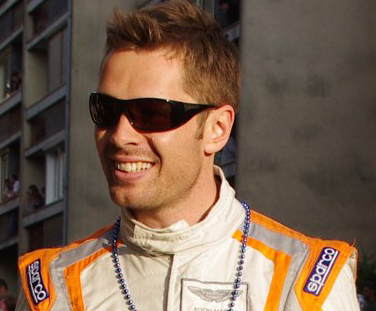
- Hancock at the 2011 24 Hours of Le Mans driver parade
- Nationality: British
- Born: Samuel James Hancock; 9 January 1980 (age 46) Surrey, England, United Kingdom
- Relatives: Ollie Hancock (brother)
- Categorisation: FIA Gold (until 2017); FIA Silver (2018–)

Championship titles
- 2004: Le Mans Series (LMP2 class)
24 Hours of Le Mans career
- Years: 2002, 2004–2006, 2010–2011
- Teams: JMB Racing; Courage Compétition; Intersport Racing; Aston Martin Racing; Jota
- Best finish: DNF

Samuel James Hancock (born 9 January 1980 in Surrey) is a British classic and historic car consultant, writer, presenter and racing driver.

== Racing record ==
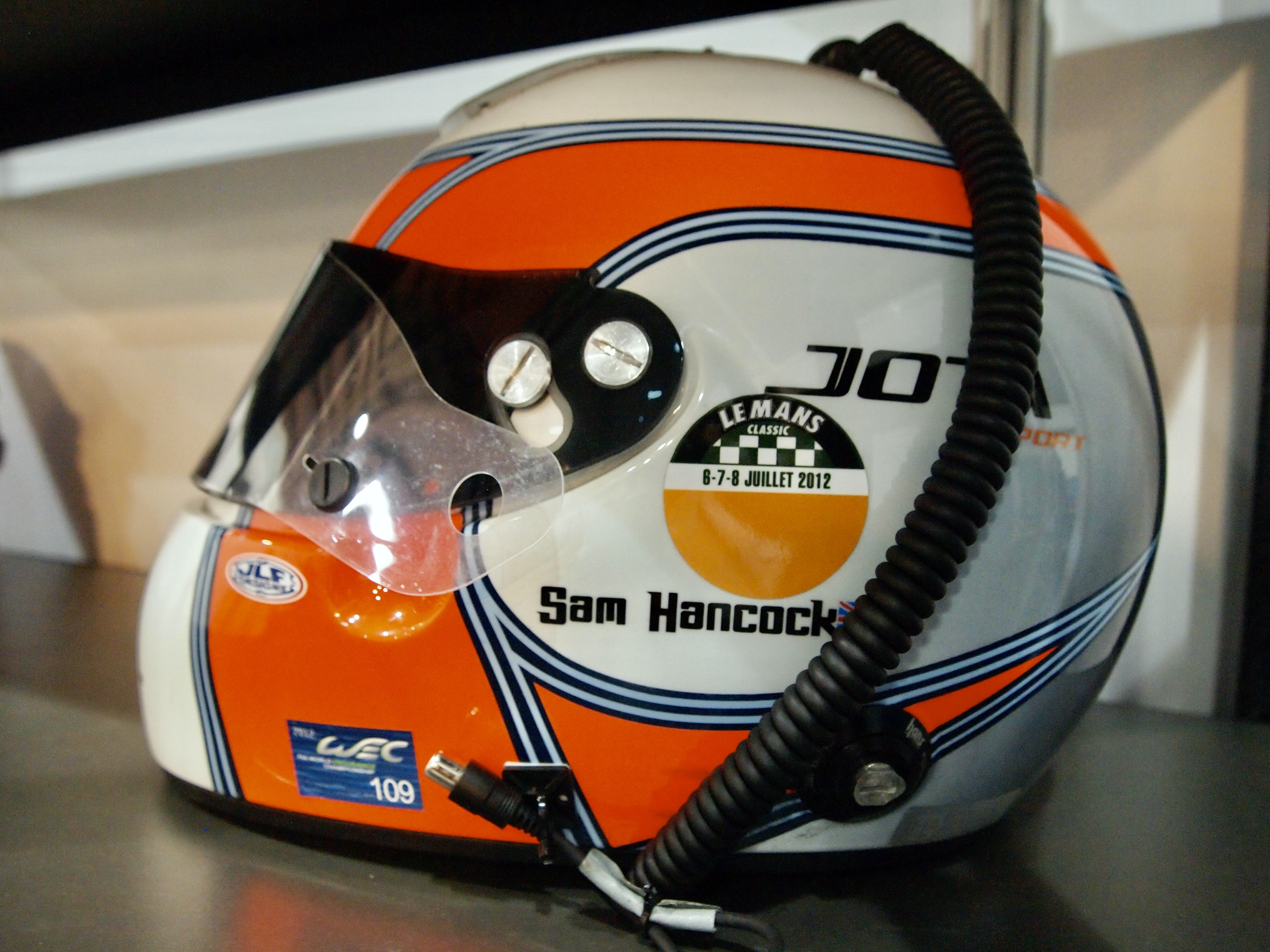
Helmet, Race Retro 2013, Stoneleigh, Warwickshire

=== American Open-Wheel racing results ===
(key) (Races in bold indicate pole position, races in italics indicate fastest race lap)

==== Barber Dodge Pro Series ====
Year	1	2	3	4	5	6	7	8	9	10	11	12	Rank	Points	Ref
2000	SEB; 28	MIA; 23	NAZ; 13	LRP; 20	DET; 14	CLE	MDO	ROA	VAN	LS	RAT	HMS	**24th**	**5**	

=== Complete International Formula 3000 results ===
(key) (Races in bold indicate pole position; races in italics indicate fastest lap.)

Year	Entrant	1	2	3	4	5	6	7	8	9	10	DC	Points
2003	Super Nova Racing	IMO	CAT	A1R	MON	NUR	MAG	SIL	HOC; 13	HUN; 11	MNZ; DNS	NC	0

=== 24 Hours of Le Mans results ===
Year	Team	Co-Drivers	Car	Class	Laps	Pos.	Class Pos.
2002	(France) JMB Racing	(United States) Cort Wagner (United Kingdom) Martin Short	Ferrari 360 Modena GT	GT	16	DNF	DNF
2004	(France) Courage Compétition	(Switzerland) Alexander Frei (France) Jean-Marc Gounon	Courage C65-JPX	LMP2	127	DNF	DNF
2005	(United States) Intersport Racing	(United States) Liz Halliday (United Kingdom) Gregor Fisken	Lola B05/40-AER	LMP2	119	DNF	DNF
2006	(France) Courage Compétition	(Switzerland) Alexander Frei (United Kingdom) Gregor Fisken	Courage LC70-Mugen	LMP1	171	DNF	DNF
2010	(United Kingdom) Aston Martin Racing	(United Kingdom) Darren Turner (Denmark) Juan Barazi	Lola-Aston Martin B09/60	LMP1	368	DNF	DNF
2011	(United Kingdom) Jota	(United Kingdom) Simon Dolan (United Kingdom) Chris Buncombe	Aston Martin V8 Vantage GT2	GTE; Pro	74	DNF	DNF
2012	(United Kingdom) Jota	(United Kingdom) Simon Dolan (Japan) Haruki Kurosawa	Zytek Z11SN-Nissan	LMP2	271	DNF	DNF

=== Complete Porsche Supercup results ===
(key) (Races in bold indicate pole position – 2 points awarded 2008 onwards in all races) (Races in italics indicate fastest lap)

Year	Team	1	2	3	4	5	6	7	8	9	10	11	12	DC	Points	Ref
2008	Tolimit	BHR1	BHR2	ESP1	TUR	MON	FRA; 16							NC‡	0‡	
2008	Porsche Cars Great Britain							GBR; 7	GER	HUN	ESP2	BEL	ITA	NC‡	0‡	

‡ Not eligible for points.
