= Claude-Yves Gosselin =

French racing driver

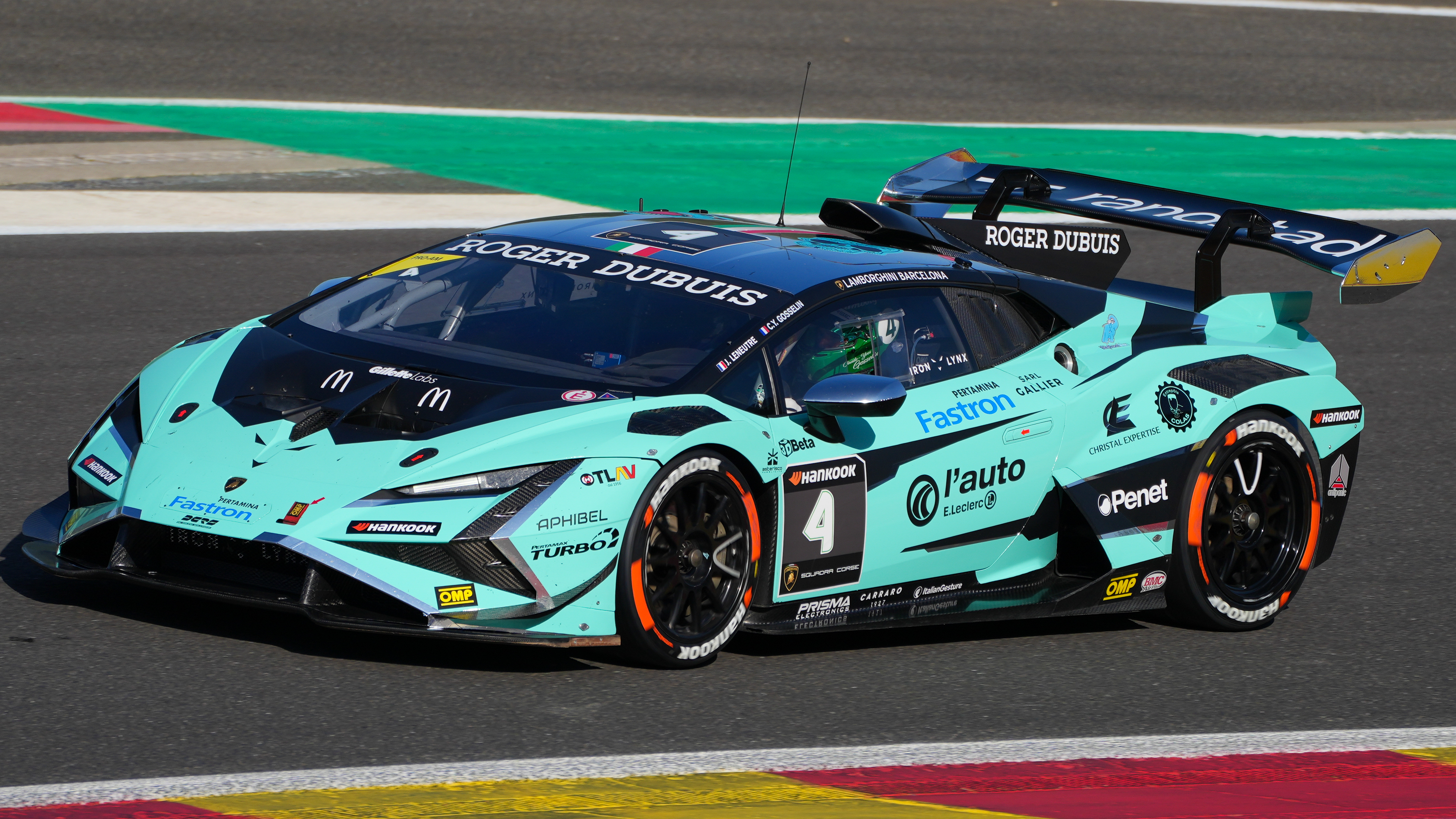
- Nationality: (France) French
- Born: Claude-Yves Georges Armand Gosselin; 19 December 1961 (age 64) Caen, France
- Categorisation: FIA Bronze
24 Hours of Le Mans career
- Years: 2005 – 2009
- Teams: Paul Belmondo Racing, PSI Experience, Trading Performance, G.A.C Racing Team
- Best finish: 2nd (2005)
- Class wins: 0

Claude-Yves Georges Armand Gosselin (born 19 December 1961, in Caen) is a French racing driver.

== Racing record ==
=== Complete International Formula 3000 results ===
(key) (Races in bold indicate pole position) (Races in italics indicate fastest lap)

Year	Entrant	1	2	3	4	5	6	7	8	DC	Points
1995	Gosselin Competition	SIL; DNQ	CAT; DNQ	PAU; DNQ	PER; Ret	HOC; Ret	SPA	EST	MAG; Ret	NC	0

=== Complete FIA GT results ===
Year	Entrant	1	2	3	4	5	6	7	8	9	10	11	DC	Points
1999	Paul Belmondo Racing	MON; 6	SIL; 7	HOC; 7	HUN; 10	ZOL; 5	OSC; 6	DON; 7	HOM	WAT	ZHU		25th	4
2000	Paul Belmondo Racing	VAL; 3	EST; 3	MON; Ret	SIL; 3	HUN; Ret	ZOL	A1R; 4	LAU; 7	BRN; 6	MAG; 4		9th	17
2001	Paul Belmondo Competition	MON; Ret	BRN	MAG; Ret	SIL; 3	ZOL; 4	HUN; 9	SPA; 5	A1R; 6	NÜR	JAR; 6	EST; 6	15th	16
2002	Paul Belmondo Racing	MAG; 7	SIL; 6	BRN	JAR; 5	AND; 7	OSC; 7	SPA; 5	PER	DON; Ret	EST; Ret		26th	6.5
2003	Paul Belmondo Racing	CAT	MAG	PER	BRN	DON	SPA; Ret	AND	OSC	EST	MON		NC	0

=== 24 Hours of Le Mans results ===
Year	Team	Co-Drivers	Car	Class	Laps	Pos.	Class Pos.
2004	(France) Paul Belmondo Racing	(France) Paul Belmondo (France) Marco Saviozzi	Courage C65-AER	LMP2	80	DNF	DNF
2005	(France) Paul Belmondo Racing	(Saudi Arabia) Karim Ojjeh (United Kingdom) Adam Sharpe	Courage C65-Ford	LMP2	300	21st	**2nd**
2006	(France) Paul Belmondo Racing	(Saudi Arabia) Karim Ojjeh (France) Pierre Ragues	Courage C65-Ford	LMP2	84	DNF	DNF
2007	(Belgium) PSI Experience	(France) David Hallyday (Austria) Philipp Peter	Chevrolet Corvette C6.R	GT1	289	28th	12th
2008	(Switzerland) Trading Performance	(Saudi Arabia) Karim Ojjeh (United Kingdom) Adam Sharpe	Zytek 07S/2	LMP2	22	DNF	DNF
2009	(Switzerland) G.A.C Racing Team	(Saudi Arabia) Karim Ojjeh (Austria) Philipp Peter	Zytek 07S/2	LMP2	102	DNF	DNF
