= Karim Ojjeh =

Syrian businessman and racer

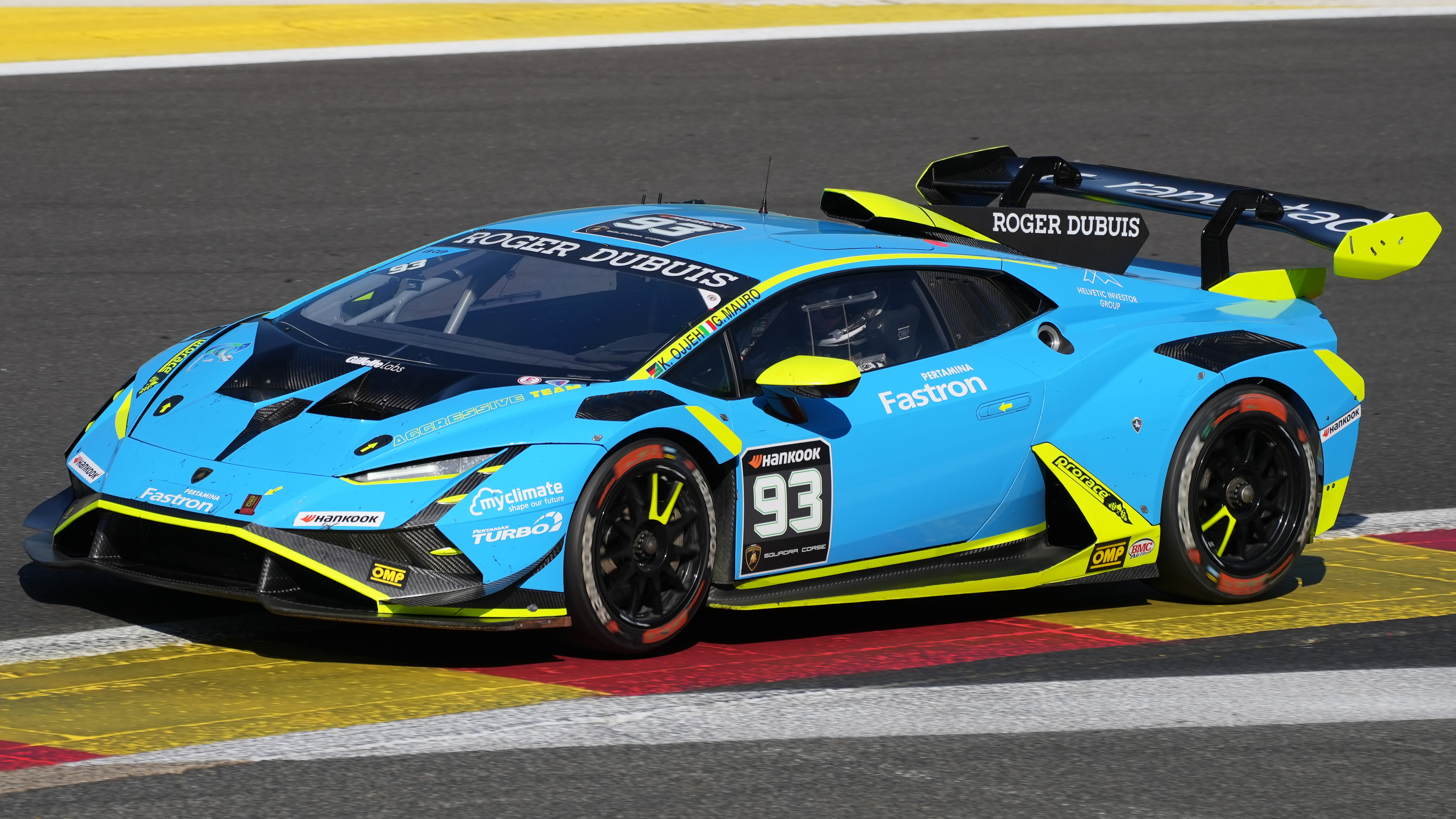
- Ojjeh at Circuit de Spa-Francorchamps in 2024
- Nationality: Saudi Arabian
- Born: 27 August 1965 (age 61) Geneva, Switzerland
- Relatives: Akram Ojjeh (father); Mansour Ojjeh (brother)
- Categorisation: FIA Silver (until 2013); FIA Bronze (2012–) (Note: During the 2012–2013 period, Ojjeh simultaneously held an FIA WEC categorisation of silver and an FIA GT3 categorisation of bronze. He was downgraded to bronze by FIA WEC in 2014. When both lists merged in 2015, he remained bronze.)
24 Hours of Le Mans career
- Years: 2005 – 2011
- Teams: Paul Belmondo Racing; Barazi-Epsilon; Trading Performance; GAC Racing Team; Team Bruichladdich; Greaves Motorsport
- Best finish: 8th (2011)
- Class wins: 1

Karim Ojjeh (Arabic: كريم عجة; born 27 August 1965 in Geneva) is a Saudi businessman and racing driver. He is the younger brother of Mansour Ojjeh and son of Akram Ojjeh. He is a director of TAG Finance S.A. In his spare time, he races in the Le Mans Series and the 24 Hours of Le Mans.

== Racing career ==
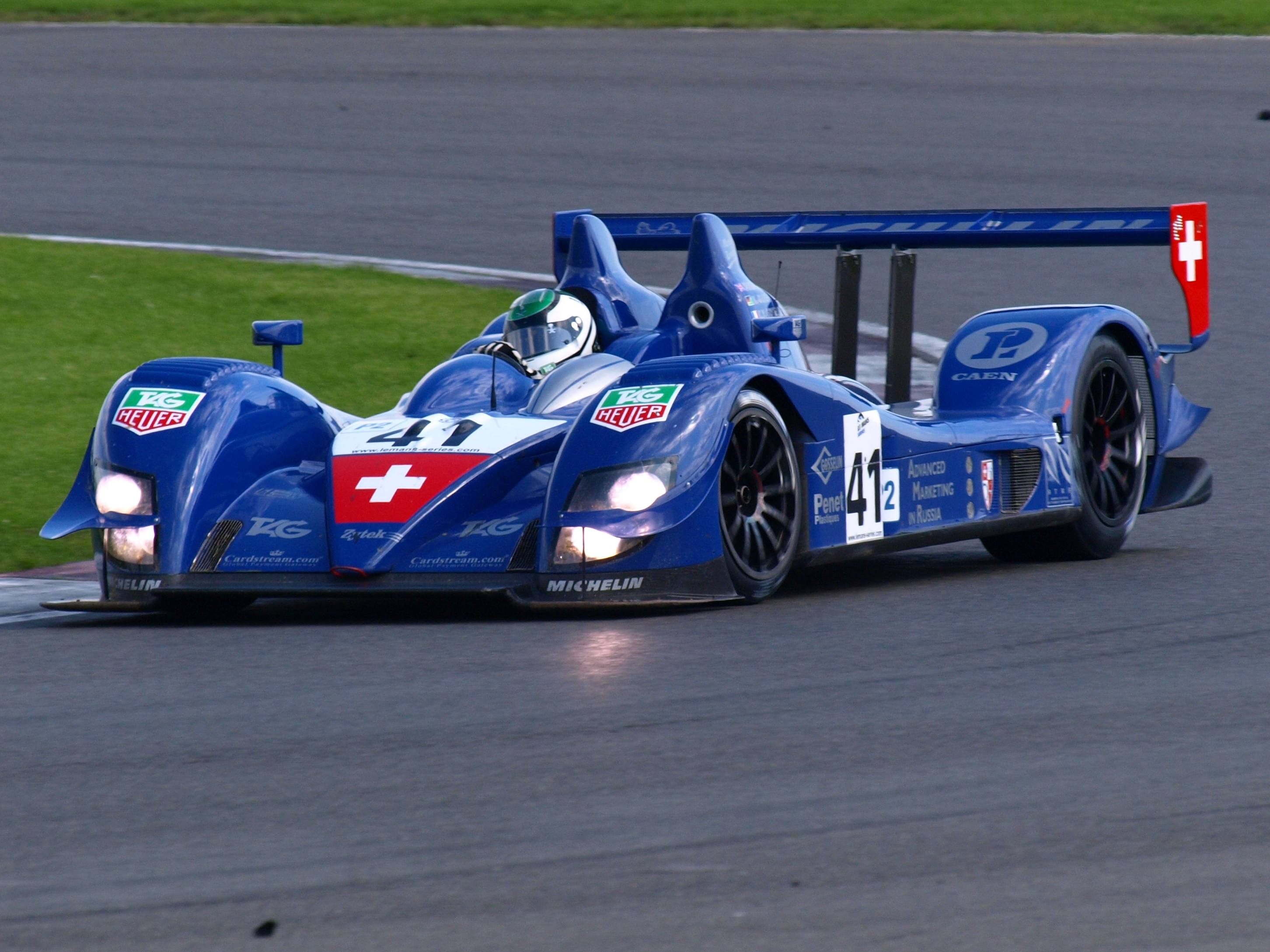
Ojjeh racing in the 2008 1000 km of Silverstone.

Between 1991 and 1994, Ojjeh attended the Jim Russell Racing Driver School. He raced in Formula Palmer Audi between 2002 and 2004. He made his Le Mans Series debut in 2004 in a Ferrari 360 Modena. In 2005, he competed full-time in the series for Paul Belmondo Racing in an LMP2 Courage-AER, winning two races. Ojjeh and the team finished second in class at the 2005 24 Hours of Le Mans. Ojjeh continued racing with the team in 2006, but for 2007, he moved to Barazi-Epsilon, winning two LMS races in their Zytek. For 2008, Ojjeh competed in a Zytek 07S/2 for the Trading Performance team. In 2009, Ojjeh raced the Zytek under the G.A.C Racing Team banner, and for 2010 raced the updated Ginetta-Zytek GZ09S/2 for Team Bruichladdich.

In 2012, Ojjeh drove the McLaren MP4-12C GT3 of ASM Team in the Blancpain Endurance Series.

== 24 Hours of Le Mans results ==
| Year | Team | Co-Drivers | Car | Class | Laps | Pos. | Class Pos. |
|---|---|---|---|---|---|---|---|
| 2005 | (France) Paul Belmondo Racing | (France) Claude-Yves Gosselin (United Kingdom) Adam Sharpe | Courage C65-Ford | LMP2 | 300 | 21st | 2nd |
| 2006 | (France) Paul Belmondo Racing | (France) Claude-Yves Gosselin (France) Pierre Ragues | Courage C65-Ford | LMP2 | 84 | DNF | DNF |
| 2007 | (France) Barazi-Epsilon | (Denmark) Juan Barazi (Netherlands) Michael Vergers | Zytek 07S/2 | LMP2 | 252 | DNF | DNF |
| 2008 | (Switzerland) Trading Performance | (France) Claude-Yves Gosselin (United Kingdom) Adam Sharpe | Zytek 07S/2 | LMP2 | 22 | DNF | DNF |
| 2009 | (Switzerland) G.A.C Racing Team | (France) Claude-Yves Gosselin (Austria) Philipp Peter | Zytek 07S/2 | LMP2 | 102 | DNF | DNF |
| 2010 | (United Kingdom) Team Bruichladdich | (United Kingdom) Tim Greaves (France) Gary Chalandon | Ginetta-Zytek GZ09S/2 | LMP2 | 341 | 10th | 5th |
| 2011 | (United Kingdom) Greaves Motorsport | (France) Olivier Lombard (United Kingdom) Tom Kimber-Smith | Zytek Z11SN-Nissan | LMP2 | 326 | 8th | 1st |

== Notes ==
Sporting positions
| Preceded by Thomas Erdos; Mike Newton | Le Mans Series LMP2 Champion; 2011 with: Tom Kimber-Smith | Succeeded by Mathias Beche; Pierre Thiriet; European Le mans Series |
