= Juan Barazi =

Danish racing driver and businessman

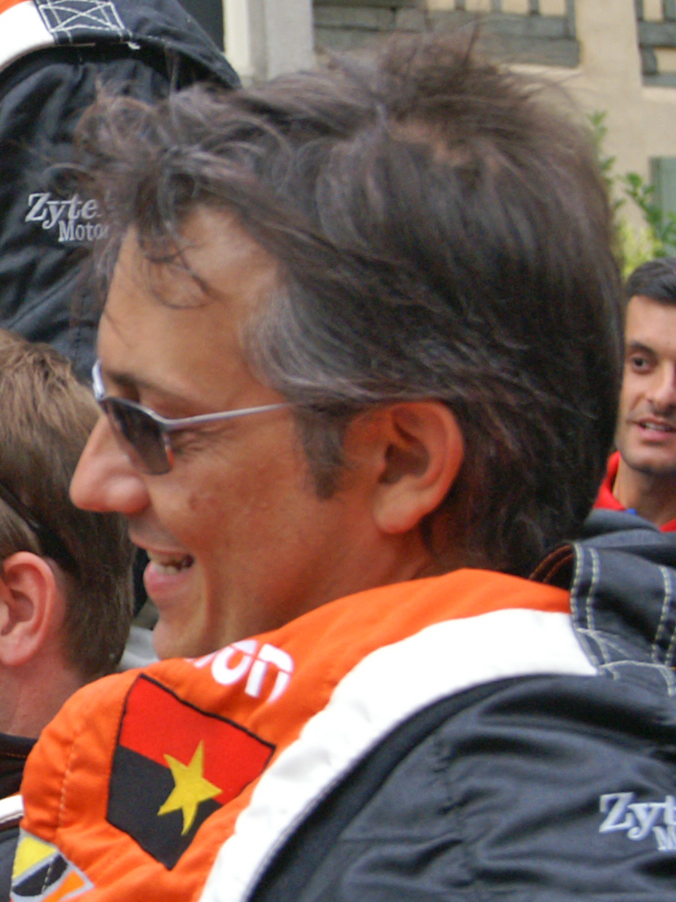
- Juan Barazi
- Nationality: Danish
- Born: 22 January 1968 (age 58) Copenhagen, Denmark
24 Hours of Le Mans career
- Years: 2005 – 2010
- Teams: Intersport Racing; Barazi-Epsilon; Aston Martin Racing
- Best finish: 21st (2006)

Juan Barazi (born 22 January 1968 in Copenhagen) is a Danish racing driver and businessman. The Swiss-educated lawyer is the scion of an ancient Syrian noble family.

Barazi entered motorsport through his extensive classic car collection which includes an Aston Martin DB3S, Aston Martin DB4 GT Zagato, a Ferrari 250LM, a Ferrari 246 Sport Dino and a Porsche 917. He often races his cars and has twice won the hotly contested Goodwood Revival Tourist Trophy in his 1962 Jaguar Lightweight Competition E-Type as well as several other international races.

Barazi competed in British Formula Ford 1600 in 1999, finishing second in 2000. Barazi started competing in Radical one-make series in 2001, becoming vice-champion of the British Enduro series in 2004. He was also the champion of the Classic Endurance Racing series in his Porsche 917. He also competed in the Le Mans Series in a Porsche 911 GT3 RSR as well as five seasons in the LMP2 category. He won the Le Mans Series LMP2 Championship outright in 2006 and has placed top five during three further seasons.

In 2005, Barazi made his debut at the 24 Hours of Le Mans, driving an LMP2 Courage C65. He then purchased the car and set up his own team, Barazi-Epsilon, with Michel Lecomte. In 2006, the team began competing in the Le Mans Series and at the 24 Hours of Le Mans. The team won the LMP2 category of the Le Mans Series. In 2007, the team switched to a Zytek 07S. Barazi and his team competed at Le Mans every year up to and including 2009.

For the 2010 24 Hours of Le Mans, Barazi raced for Aston Martin Racing in the LMP1 category in one of their Lola-Aston Martin B09/60s, alongside Darren Turner and Sam Hancock. The trio retired with a blown engine at 40 mins before the end of the race when running fourth overall and first petrol car on the grid.

== 24 Hours of Le Mans results ==
Year	Team	Co-drivers	Car	Class	Laps	Pos.	Class pos.
2005	(United States) Intersport Racing (United Kingdom) Cirtek Motorsport	(Russia) Sergey Zlobin (France) Bastien Brière	Courage C65-AER	LMP2	30	DNF	DNF
2006	(France) Barazi-Epsilon	(Netherlands) Michael Vergers (New Zealand) Neil Cunningham	Courage C65-AER	LMP2	294	21st	6th
2007	(France) Barazi-Epsilon	(Netherlands) Michael Vergers (Saudi Arabia) Karim Ojjeh	Zytek 07S/2	LMP2	252	DNF	DNF
2008	(France) Barazi-Epsilon	(Netherlands) Michael Vergers (United Kingdom) Stuart Moseley	Zytek 07S/2	LMP2	304	29th	5th
2009	(France) Barazi-Epsilon	(United Kingdom) Phil Bennett (United Kingdom) Stuart Moseley	Zytek 07S/2	LMP2	306	28th	4th
2010	(United Kingdom) Aston Martin Racing	(United Kingdom) Darren Turner (United Kingdom) Sam Hancock	Lola-Aston Martin B09/60	LMP1	368	DNF	DNF

Sporting positions
Preceded by Gareth Evans	Le Mans Series LMP2 Champion; 2006 with: Michael Vergers	Succeeded by Thomas Erdos; Mike Newton
