= 2005 24 Hours of Le Mans =

73rd 24 Hours of Le Mans endurance race

Previous: 2004	Next: 2006
Index: Races | Winners

Circuit de la Sarthe track

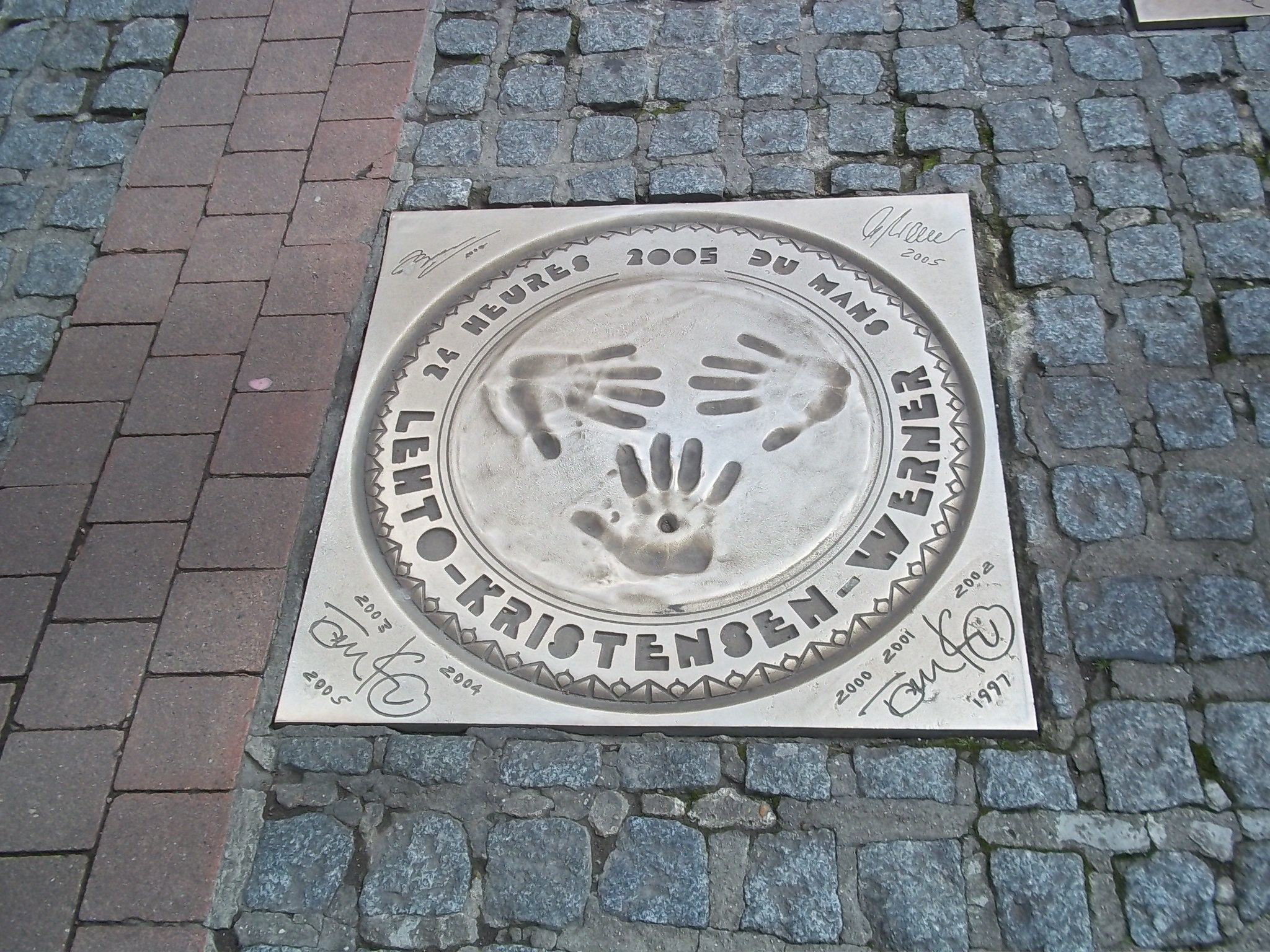
A bronze plaque with the handprints of the overall winners.

The 2005 24 Hours of Le Mans (French: 73^{e} 24 Heures du Mans) was a non-championship 24-hour automobile endurance race held from 18 to 19 June 2005, at the Circuit de la Sarthe near Le Mans, France, for teams of three drivers each entering Le Mans Prototype and Grand Touring cars. It was the 73rd running of the event, as organised by the automotive group, the Automobile Club de l'Ouest (ACO) since 1923. A test day was held two weeks prior to the race on 5 June. Approximately 230,000 people attended the race.

Jean-Christophe Boullion, Emmanuel Collard and Érik Comas began from pole position in a Pescarolo Sport C60 car after Boullion set the overall fastest lap time in the fourth qualifying session. The car led for the first two hours before a gearbox problem forced it into the garage for repairs, allowing Emanuele Pirro's Champion Racing Audi R8 to take the lead until Pirro crashed after a safety car intervention. JJ Lehto, Tom Kristensen and Marco Werner drove the sister Champion car to victory. It was Werner's first Le Mans victory, Lehto's second, and Kristensen's seventh. Kristensen surpassed Jacky Ickx to become the all-time leader in overall Le Mans victories and Audi claimed its fifth victory since the 2000 race. Pescarolo finished second, two laps behind, and the sister Champion Audi car of Frank Biela, Allan McNish and Pirro finished third.

The Ray Mallock Racing MG-Lola EX264 car of Thomas Erdos, Mike Newton and Warren Hughes won the Le Mans Prototype 2 (LMP2) category after taking the class lead in the race's final hour. Karim Ojjeh, Claude-Yves Gosselin and Adam Sharpe in a Paul Belmondo Racing Courage C65 finished second, five laps behind the MG-Lola, while Didier André, Paul Belmondo and Rick Sutherland's sister No. 37 car was third. Corvette Racing won their fourth class victory since their debut in the 2001 race. Olivier Beretta, Oliver Gavin and Jan Magnussen's No. 64 Chevrolet Corvette C6.R held a two-lap advantage over the No. 63 of Ron Fellows, Max Papis and Johnny O'Connell in the Le Mans Grand Touring 1 (LMGT1) category. Porsches led the Le Mans Grand Touring 2 (LMGT2) class with the No. 71 Alex Job Racing 911 GT3-RSR of Leo Hindery, Marc Lieb and Mike Rockenfeller ahead of the No. 90 White Lighting Racing car of Jörg Bergmeister, Patrick Long and Timo Bernhard.

== Background ==
In September 2004, the dates for the 2005 24 Hours of Le Mans were announced. It was the 73rd edition of the race and took place at the 8.482 mi (13.650 km) Circuit de la Sarthe road racing circuit close by Le Mans, France, from 18 to 19 June. The race was first held in 1923 after the automotive journalist Charles Faroux, the Automobile Club de l'Ouest (ACO) general secretary Georges Durand and the industrialist Emile Coquile agreed to hold a test of vehicle reliability and durability. The 24 Hours of Le Mans is considered one of the world's most prestigious motor races and is part of the Triple Crown of Motorsport.

=== Regulation and track changes ===
The Le Mans regulations for the two Grand Touring (GT) categories underwent significant changes for the event. Le Mans Grand Touring Sport became Le Mans Grand Touring 1 (LMGT1), while Le Mans Grand Touring became Le Mans Grand Touring 2 (LMGT2). Both the Fédération Internationale de l'Automobile, the world governing body of motor racing, and the ACO required new vehicles in both classes to be homologated. In 2005, cars built to comply with the Le Mans Prototype 900 (LMP900) regulations could compete alongside newer "hybrid" cars built to comply with the updated aerodynamic regulations in the Le Mans Prototype 1 (LMP1) category for the last time. LMP900 cars had to run with a smaller air restrictor to reduce engine performance and they had to weigh more than "hybrid" cars.

The ACO recommended that LMGT1 cars lap the Circuit de la Sarthe in no less than 3 minutes, 55 seconds, and LMGT2 cars in no less than 4 minutes, 8 seconds. Had these rules not been met, the automotive group would immediately intervene to lower the performance of individual cars by altering their aerodynamic efficiency, reducing the size of the air restrictor and the fuel tank for future editions of the Le Mans race. GT2-specification vehicles could compete if at least 100 road-going cars were built by "the big manufacturers" and 25 by "the small manufacturers." The ACO would otherwise suspend homologation for the 2006 race.

The circuit was resurfaced from Mulsanne to Arnage corners from late 2004 to early 2005, and a section of road at the circuit's 89th post was levelled.

== Entries ==
By the deadline for entries on 19 January 2005, the ACO had received 78 applications (37 for the Le Mans Prototype (LMP) classes and 41 for the GT categories). It granted 50 invitations to the race, with entries divided between the LMP1, LMP2, LMGT1, and LMGT2 categories.

=== Automatic entries ===
Teams that won their category in the 2004 24 Hours of Le Mans earned automatic entries. Teams that won Le Mans-related series and events such as the 2004 Petit Le Mans, the 2004 Le Mans Endurance Series and the 2004 American Le Mans Series were also invited. Some second-place finishers were also granted automatic entries in certain series, though none were given to the winners and runners-up of the 2004 FIA GT Championship's GT and N-GT categories, as was the case the previous year. Because entries were pre-selected to teams, they were limited to a maximum of two cars and were not permitted to change their vehicles from year to year. Entries were allowed to switch categories as long as they did not change the make of their car and the ACO granted official permission for the switch.

The ACO published its final list of automatic invitations on 18 January 2005. Audi Sport Japan Team Goh, the 2004 winners, and the runners-up Audi Sport UK Team Veloqx were among the teams to decline their automatic entries. Dyson Racing, Prodrive Racing, Barron Connor Racing, ChoroQ Racing Team, JMB Racing and Alex Job Racing also declined their automatic entries. No replacements were found.

Automatic entries for the 2005 24 Hours of Le Mans
Reason Entered	LMP1	LMP2	LMGT1	LMGT2
1st in the 24 Hours of Le Mans	Audi Sport Japan Team Goh^{1}	(United States) Intersport Racing	(United States) Corvette Racing	(United States) White Lighting Racing
2nd in the 24 Hours of Le Mans	(United Kingdom) Audi Sport UK Team Veloqx^{1}	(France) Rachel Welter	(United Kingdom) Prodrive Racing^{1}	(Japan) ChoroQ Racing Team^{1}
1st in the 2004 Le Mans Endurance Series	(United Kingdom) Audi Sport UK Team Veloqx^{1}	(France) Courage Compétition	(France) Larbre Compétition	(United Kingdom) Sebah Automotive
2nd in the 2004 Le Mans Endurance Series	(Japan) Team Goh^{1}	(France) PiR Compétition	(Netherlands) Barron Connor Racing^{1}	(Monaco) JMB Racing^{1}
1st in the 2004 Petit Le Mans	(United States) Champion Racing	(United States) Intersport Racing	(United States) Corvette Racing	(United States) Alex Job Racing^{1}
1st in the 2004 American Le Mans Series	(United States) Dyson Racing^{1}	(United States) Miracle Motorsports	(United States) Corvette Racing	(United States) Flying Lizard Motorsports
Sources:

1. – Team declined their automatic invitations.

=== Entry list and reserves ===
The ACO announced the complete 50-car entry list for Le Mans, plus eight reserves, on 24 March 2005. Several teams withdrew their entries after they were published. Team Nasamax withdrew its two-year-old bio-ethanol-powered DM139-Judd car, citing financial difficulties causing the team to reduce its schedule for the 2005 racing season. This promoted the No. 91 T2M Motorsport Porsche 911-GT3 RSR LMGT2-class car to the race entry. Four days later, ACEMCO Motorsports withdrew its No. 63 Saleen S7-R due to aerodynamic deficiencies caused by a modification of the height of the car's rear wing at the 2004 Petit Le Mans to comply with ACO regulations. This promoted the reserve No. 76 IMSA Performance LMGT2-class Porsche to the race.

A revised entry list released by the ACO on 27 April confirmed the withdrawal of the Team Nasamax and ACEMCO Motorsports entries as well as the dropping of the Graham Nash Motorsport Saleen S7-R, Thierry Perrier's Porsche 911-GT3 RSR, a second Racing for Holland Dome S101-Judd car, a Ferrari 360 Modena GTC fielded by G.P.C. Sport and a second Ferrari 550-GTS Maranello purchased by Larbre Compétition from the reserve list. Four days before the start of scrutineering, Lucchini Engineering were unable to rectify a gearbox ratio problem in its LMP2/04 and were forced to withdraw the car, reducing the number of entries to 49.

== Testing ==
On June 5, a mandatory two-session pre-Le Mans test day lasting eight hours was held at the circuit, with 50 entries, to work on car setup and driver orientation. Rainfall before the end of the afternoon session made it impossible for teams to lap faster. Emmanuel Collard in the No. 16 C60 Hybrid Judd car set the day's pace for Pescarolo Sport with a 3:32.468 lap. The No. 17 Pescarolo of Soheil Ayari was second, and Jonathan Cochet's No. 13 Courage Compétition car came in third. JJ Lehto's No. 3 Champion Racing Audi R8 was fourth with Seiji Ara's No. 5 Jim Gainer International Dome S101 fifth. João Barbosa's lap put the No. 18 Rollcentre Racing Dallara SP1 car in sixth place, while Franck Montagny's Team Oreca Audi was seventh. Sam Hancock led the LMP2 class in the No. 32 Intersport Racing Lola B05/40 vehicle with a time of 3:44.426 ahead of Ray Mallock's No. 32 MG-Lola EX264 of Thomas Erdos, the No. 30 Kruse Motorsport Courage C65 of Phil Bennett and Didier André's No. 37 Paul Belmondo Racing cars. Aston Martin, in its first Le Mans works entry since the 1989 event, led the LMGT1 category with a 3:50.033 lap from Tomáš Enge's No. 58 DBR9, with David Brabham's No. 59 car second. Christophe Bouchut's No. 61 Cirtek Motorsport Ferrari and Oliver Gavin and Johnny O'Connell's Nos. 64 and 63 Chevrolet Corvette C6.R finished third and fifth in class, respectively. Timo Bernhard's No. 90 White Lighting Racing car helped Porsche lead the LMGT2 category, followed by Robin Liddell's No. 77 Panoz Esperante GT-LM and Romain Dumas' No. 76 IMSA Performance car.

== Qualifying ==
All entrants had eight hours of qualifying, divided into four two-hour sessions on 15 and 16 June. To qualify for the race, all entrants were required to set a time within 115% of the fastest lap set by the fastest vehicle in each of the four categories during the sessions. Rain fell during the first session's start, making the track slippery and decreasing visibility. Some drivers met the required minimum distance to drive in the race. Collard took the lead late in the session with a lap of 4:13.526. Tom Kristensen's lap put Champion's lead Audi in second and Ryō Michigami's Jim Gainer Dome car was third. Andy Wallace was fourth in Creation Autosportif's No. 7 DBA 03S-Judd car, and Michael Krumm was fifth in his Rollcentre Dallara. Ayari's Pescarolo was provisionally sixth and Allan McNish's No. 2 Champion car was seventh. Bouchut drove the Cirtek Ferrari to provisional pole in LMGT1 with a 4:23.885 lap, more than 12 seconds ahead of the two Aston Martin cars. Andre's Paul Belmondo Courage took the LMP2 lead with a lap of 4:24.832, and Hancock's Intersport Lola was second. Earlier, Peter Owen's No. 39 Chamberlain-Synergy Motorsport Lola caused the session to be stopped due to a loss of control at the rear while changing gears. Owen was unhurt after crashing at the exit of the second Mulsanne chicane. Mike Rockenfeller's Alex Job Porsche was fastest in LMGT2 with a 4:37.574 lap, followed by Jörg Bergmeister's No. 90 White Lighting and Dumas' No. 76 IMSA Performance entries.

When the track dried near the end of the second qualifying session, lap times decreased. Ayari in Pescarolo's No. 17 car improved provisional pole position by more than 12 seconds with a 4:01.197 lap just before the session ended, followed by McNish's improved No. 2 Champion Audi and Nicolas Minassian in Creation Autosportif's No. 7 DBA 03S entry. Montagny put the Oreca Audi on provisional pole with half an hour remaining before falling to fourth. Lehto in the second Champion car fell to fifth. Michigami was sixth and Jota's Zytek 04S car of Sam Hignett seventh. A seal on a fuel rig braking during a pit stop caused a flash fire that damaged the Rollcentre Dallara's bodywork. The car's damage forced it to stop running early. Hancock gave the Intersport team provisional pole in the LMP2 class after displacing Andre's Paul Belmondo car, setting a time of 4:11.719, a second faster than Ian James' second-placed No. 34 Miracle Motorsports Courage. In LMGT1, Vincent Vosse led the session with a lap of 4:20.688, displacing the Cirtek Ferrari at the top of the time sheets. Similarly, Dumas set a lap of 4:25.598 in the IMSA Performance Porsche to lead the LMGT2 category with 35 minutes remaining.

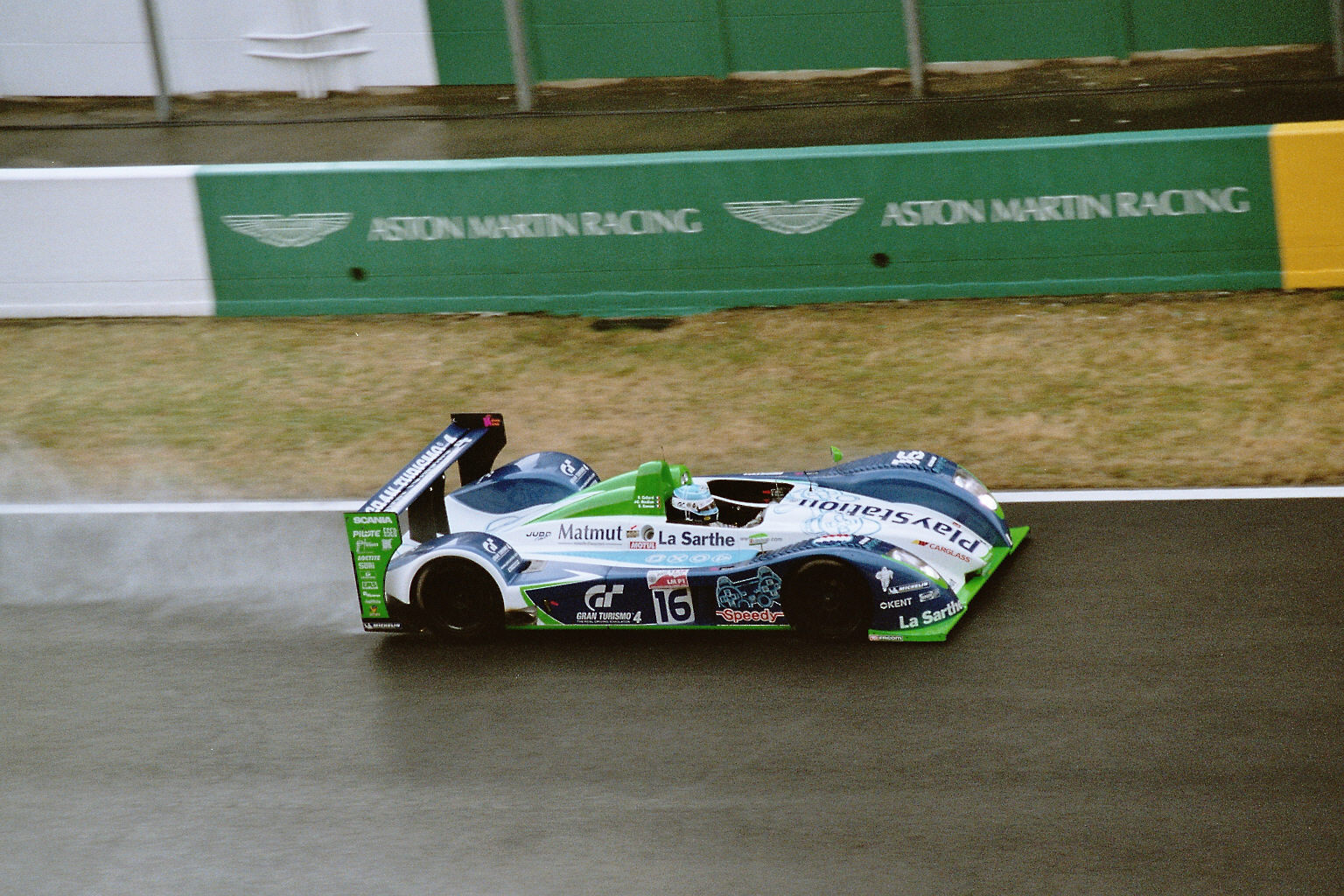
The No. 16 Pescarolo Sport C60 took overall pole position in the hands of Emmanuel Collard during the final qualifying session.

The weather for the two qualifying sessions on 16 June was humid and dry. For the second consecutive session, Ayari's No. 17 Pescarolo vehicle improved provisional pole position to a 3:35.555 lap. Team Oreca's Audi of Montagny was second and McNish was the fastest Champion car in third. Cochet improved the No. 13 Pescarolo's time in the session's final minutes to go into fourth as Minassian's DBA 03S fell to fifth. Michigami's Jim Gainer Dome remained sixth and Barbosa's Rollcentre Dallara was seventh. The No. 16 Pescarolo C60 had its times deleted for Collard touching the car after relieving Jean-Christophe Boullion though the penalty was rescinded 40 minutes later. In LMP2, Warren Hughes' first lap of 3:49.845 in the No. 25 Ray Mallock MG-Lola was bettered by James' 3:48.819 time in the No. 34 Miracle Courage C65 to lead the category. A crash at the exit to Indianapolis corner by Jean-Bernard Bouvet's No. 23 Gerard Welter WR LMP04 car halted the session after 90 minutes. Pedro Lamy helped Aston Martin to lead in LMGT1 with a 3:50.311 lap, followed by Brabham's No. 59 car and Gavin and O'Connell's Corvettes. Rockenfeller greatly improved Alex Job's Porsche lap to maintain the lead in LMGT2 with a time of 4:05.326. Johannes van Overbeek's No. 80 Flying Lizard Motorsports and Bill Auberlen's No. 77 Panoz were second and third in class. Tom Coronel's throttle stuck in the No. 85 Spyker C8 Spyder GT2-R and he crashed in the Porsche Curves. Andrew Kirkcaldy's No. 93 Scuderia Ecosse Ferrari struck a barrier at the Ford Chicane.

As temperatures cooled in the final qualifying session, three-quarters of the field improved their fastest laps, including Collard's No. 16 Pescarolo car, which set a lap of 3:34.715 on his first lap and held the place to secure pole position. Ayari was 0.840 seconds slower and joined Collard on the grid's front row. McNish's Champion car was third, Katsumoto Kaneishi improved on the Jim Gainer Dome's lap to start fourth and Montagny's Team Oreca Audi qualified fifth. Shinji Nakano's No. 13 Courage C60 and Minassian's No. 7 DBA 03 vehicles were sixth and seventh. The No. 34 Miracle Courage C65 car of Andy Lally, Hancock, Erdos and Andre shared the lead of the LMP2 category early in the session until Andre's lap of 3:42.301 secured pole position for the Paul Belmondo team. In LMGT1 Aston Martin maintained the first two positions as Brabham led until Enge took pole position with ten minutes left with a lap of 3:48.576. Corvette Racing were third with Gavin's No. 64 car, ahead of Alexei Vasiliev's Cirtek Ferrari. Alex Job Racing's Rockenfeller retained first place in LMGT2 ahead of the No. 80 Flying Lizard and No. 77 Panoz cars. A crash for Bergmeister into Tetre Rouge corner ended Flying Lizard's session early.

=== Post-qualifying ===
Despite qualifying more than 115 per cent slower than the fastest LMP2 car, the stewards declared force majeure after the team's No. 35 Courage C65 vehicle was heavily damaged in the first qualifying session. The team was granted dispensation to start at the back of the grid.

=== Qualifying results ===
Pole position winners in each class are indicated in bold. The fastest time set by each entry is denoted in gray.

Final qualifying classification
Pos	Class	No.	Team	Car	Day 1	Day 2	Gap	Grid
1	**LMP1**	**16**	**Pescarolo Sport**	**Pescarolo C60 Hybrid-Judd**	4:13.526	**3:34.715**	—	1
2	LMP1	17	Pescarolo Sport	Pescarolo C60 Hybrid-Judd	4:01.197	3:35.555	+0.840	2
3	LMP1	2	ADT Champion Racing	Audi R8	4:02.027	3:37.795	+3.080	3
4	LMP1	5	Jim Gainer International	Dome S101Hb-Mugen	4:08.745	3:38.094	+3.379	4
5	LMP1	4	Audi PlayStation Team Oreca	Audi R8	4:05.770	3:38.281	+3.566	5
6	LMP1	13	Courage Compétition	Courage C60H-Judd	4:26.247	3:38.785	+4.070	6
7	LMP1	7	Creation Autosportif	DBA 03S-Judd	4:02.992	3:38.929	+4.214	7
8	LMP1	3	ADT Champion Racing	Audi R8	4:07.643	3:38.988	+4.273	8
9	LMP1	18	Rollcentre Racing	Dallara SP1-Judd	4:28.852	3:39.643	+4.928	9
10	LMP1	9	Team Jota	Zytek 04S	4:09.578	3:41.177	+6.462	10
11	LMP1	10	Racing for Holland	Dome S101-Judd	4:15.816	3:41.930	+7.265	11
12	**LMP2**	**37**	**Paul Belmondo Racing**	**Courage C65-Ford AER**	4:14.406	**3:42.301**	**+7.526**	12
13	LMP1	12	Courage Compétition	Courage C60H-Judd	4:45.084	3:42.859	+8.144	13
14	LMP1	8	Rollcentre Racing	Dallara SP1-Nissan	4:20.862	3:43.377	+8.662	14
15	LMP2	32	Intersport Racing	Lola B05/40-AER	4:11.719	3:44.752	+10.040	15
16	LMP2	25	Ray Mallock Ltd.	MG-Lola EX264-Judd	4:28.869	3:46.205	+11.490	16
17	**GT1**	**58**	**Aston Martin Racing**	**Aston Martin DBR9**	4:31.022	**3:48.576**	**+13.861**	17
18	LMP2	34	Miracle Motorsports	Courage C65-AER	4:12.754	3:48.819	+14.104	18
19	LMP2	30	Kruse Motorsport	Courage C65-Judd	4:31.127	3:49.267	+14.552	19
20	GT1	59	Aston Martin Racing	Aston Martin DBR9	4:22.600	3:49.739	+15.024	20
21	LMP2	33	Cirtek Motorsport	Courage C65-AER	4:29.217	3:51.844	+17.129	21
22	GT1	64	Corvette Racing	Chevrolet Corvette C6.R	4:36.209	3:52.426	+17.711	22
23	LMP2	31	Noël del Bello Racing	Courage C65-CG-Mecachrome	4:21.562	3:53.051	+18.336	23
24	LMP2	36	Paul Belmondo Racing	Courage C65-Ford AER	4:27.268	3:53.376	+18.661	24
25	GT1	61	Russian Age Racing	Ferrari 550-GTS Maranello	4:23.885	3:55.309	+20.594	25
26	LMP2	39	Chamberlain-Synergy Motorsport	Lola B05/40-AER	4:51.514	3:55.531	+20.816	26
27	GT1	63	Corvette Racing	Chevrolet Corvette C6.R	4:36.309	3:55.914	+21.199	27
28	GT1	50	Larbre Compétition	Ferrari 550-GTS Maranello	4:20.688	3:55.983	+21.268	28
29	LMP2	20	Pir Competition	Pilbeam MP93-JPX	4:39.059	3:57.612	+21.897	29
30	GT1	51	BMS Scuderia Italia	Ferrari 550-GTS Maranello	4:30.973	3:57.676	+21.961	30
31	LMP2	24	Welter Racing	WR LMP04	4:42.403	3:59.103	+23.388	31
32	GT1	52	BMS Scuderia Italia	Ferrari 550-GTS Maranello	4:24.686	3:59.475	+23.760	32
33	**GT2**	**71**	**Alex Job Racing**	**Porsche 911 GT3-RSR**	4:32.235	**4:05.326**	**+29.611**	33
34	LMP2	23	Welter Racing	WR LMP04	4:51.163	4:05.855	+30.140	34
35	GT2	80	Flying Lizard Motorsports	Porsche 911 GT3-RSR	4:44.434	4:06.658	+30.943	35
36	GT2	77	Panoz Motorsports	Panoz Esperante GT-LM-Ford Élan	4:32.904	4:07.027	+31.312	36
37	GT2	76	IMSA Performance	Porsche 911 GT3-RSR	4:25.598	4:07.349	+31.634	37
38	GT1	69	JMB Racing	Ferrari 575-GTC	4:33.600	4:07.654	+31.939	38
39	GT2	78	Panoz Motorsports	Panoz Esperante GT-LM-Ford Élan	5:07.955	4:09.262	+33.547	39
40	GT2	90	White Lightning Racing	Porsche 911 GT3-RSR	4:33.107	4:11.105	+35.390	40
41	GT2	91	T2M Motorsport	Porsche 911 GT3-RSR	4:47.922	4:12.144	+36.429	41
42	GT2	72	Luc Alphand Aventures	Porsche 911 GT3-RSR	4:41.065	4:12.258	+36.543	42
43	GT2	93	Scuderia Ecosse	Ferrari 360 Modena GTC	4:28.724	4:13.237	+37.522	43
44	GT2	89	Sebah Automotive Ltd.	Porsche 911 GT3-RSR	4:43.150	4:16.930	+41.215	44
45	GT2	92	Cirtek Motorsport	Ferrari 360 Modena GTC	4:53.019	4:20.873	+45.158	45
46	GT2	95	Racesport Peninsula TVR	TVR Tuscan T400R	4:48.379	4:22.310	+46.595	46
47	GT2	83	Seikel Motorsport	Porsche 911 GT3-RSR	4:49.404	4:24.068	+48.351	47
48	LMP2	35	G-Force Racing	Courage C65-Judd	4:31.453	No time	+55.738	48^{1}
49	GT2	85	Spyker Squadron	Spyker C8 Spyder GT2-R-Audi	4:36.539	4:32.043	+56.327	49

Notes:

- **^1** – The No. 35 G-Force Racing entry was granted dispensation to start the race after failing to qualify within 115 per cent of the fastest LMP2 car.

== Warm-up ==
The drivers had a 45-minute warm-up session at 09:00 Central European Summer Time (UTC+02:00) to test car functionality in clear and warm weather. Boullion's No. 16 Pescarolo car was the fastest with a lap of 3:37.042. The No. 3 R8 of Kristensen and Frank Biela's No. 2 car were second and third. Sébastien Loeb was fourth in the No. 17 Pescarolo car with Jamie Campbell-Walter fifth in the No. 7 Creation Autosportif DBA vehicle. Liz Halliday's No. 32 Intersport Lola fastest LMP2 lap time was 3:49.477. Bennett was second in class with his No. 30 Kruse Courage car. In LMGT1, Brabham's No. 59 Aston Martin was fastest and Lieb's No. 71 Alex Job Porsche led in LMGT2. The No. 8 Rollcentre Dallara emitted smoke from its left-hand exhaust system and the team changed engines. A major oversteer caused Dumas to lose control of the No. 76 IMSA Performance car and damage its front-right corner against a barrier leaving the Indianapolis turn.

== Race ==
=== Start and opening hours ===
The weather at the start was dry and clear with an air temperature of 32 °C (90 °F). Approximately 230,000 people attended the race. Martin Winterkorn, Audi's president, waved the French tricolour to start of the race at 16:00 local time. Pole sitter Boullion led the field. There were 49 cars scheduled to start, but Paul Belmondo's Courage, Bouvet's Gerald Welter WR, the Rollcentre Dallara, and the Chamberlain-Synergy Lola vehicles started from the pit lane because of technical issues. Boullion led his teammate Ayari for the first three laps, pulling away from the rest of the field. Michigami's Jim Gainer Dome car passed Emanuele Pirro on the inside for third entering the Dunlop chicane. On the third lap, Auberlen overtook Rockenfeller for the lead of LMGT2. Gear selection problems forced the No. 25 Ray Mallock Lola car to the garage and Michigami lost a lap due to a minor paddle shift issue. Towards the close of the first hour the LMGT1-class-leading No. 59 Aston Martin of Turner incurred two stop-and-go penalties for driving across a white line denoting the track boundaries at the Ford Chicane, dropping the car to third.

Several cars were affected by mechanical attrition in the second hour. Owing to a loose undertray on Liddell's Panoz vehicle, Lieb's Alex Job car took the lead in LMGT2. Gavin's No. 64 Corvette slowed to 60 mph (97 km/h) after a left-rear puncture caused by a lack of pressure on the Mulsanne Straight. He returned to the pit lane for a replacement wheel, falling to third in class after another delay caused by a water leak. Stefan Eriksson's No. 92 Cirtek Ferrari spun just before the Ford Chicanes, causing several drivers to scramble for space to avoid hitting his car. Soon after, Patrick Bourdais was caught off guard when Ayari lapped his No. 78 Panoz car at Arnage corner, resulting in a collision between Bourdais and Ayari. Bourdais spun into a gravel trap, tapping a tyre barrier. Ayari drove the No. 17 Pesarolo into the garage with steering and front bodywork damage. After four minutes of repairs, it dropped to sixth place, with Éric Hélary relieving Ayari.

When Campbell-Walter had a broken mechanical connection between the No. 7 DBA-Judd's paddle shift and gearbox, Enge's No. 58 Aston Martin moved into the top ten. Following high water temperatures that took 25 minutes to correct, the car dropped down the race order. LMP2 was led by Ian Mitchell's Kruse' Courage C65, which passed Hancock's Intersport Lola entry and battled the No. 37 Paul Belmondo car. Later, the Petersen Porsche passed Lieb's Alex Job car to take the lead in LMGT2. Nearing the 2-hour and 30-minute mark, Beretta's No. 64 Corvette suffered a second rear-left puncture and entered the pit lane for another tyre change. Shortly after, Comas's No. 16 Pescarolo ceded the race lead to Pirro's No. 2 Audi as a gear selection fault required a visit to the garage, dropping the car to fifth. It lost further positions as the problem persisted leaving the first Mulsanne chicane with Collard driving.

The Chamberlain-Synergy Lola began leaking oil at the end of the second hour, requiring the ACO to deploy three safety cars for 15 minutes while marshals scattered cement dust to dry the spilled oil. Pirro locked his cold tyres heavily on the run to Arnage corner as the safety cars were recalled, colliding with a tyre barrier with the No. 2 Audi's left-front corner. Marshals recovered the vehicle, and Pirro drove slowly to the pit lane for bodywork repairs. The No. 2 Audi rejoined in fifth place, with Marco Werner taking the lead and Stéphane Ortelli's Team Oreca car moving into second. A left-rear puncture on Hélary No. 16 Pescarolo C60 car midway through the lap necessitated a pit stop to repair bodywork damage. After a ten-minute pit stop, the car rejoined the race in seventh place. Krumm's recovering No. 18 Rollcentre Dallara car, which had a cured misfiring engine, was forced to enter the pit lane to repair a broken power steering pump that needed fluid replenishment.

=== Night ===
As night fell, Max Papis' No. 63 Corvette took the lead in LMGT1 as Lamy made a pit stop to give the No. 58 Aston Martin to co-driver Peter Kox. Bruce Jouanny's No. 13 Courage C60H suffered a major rear left puncture on the approach from Mulsanne corner to Indianapolis turn, removing the car's rear wing and bodywork and forcing its retirement in the garage. The incident delayed Ortelli, who drove into a gravel trap at the Dunlop Esses after hitting debris from Jouanny's car, but he avoided hitting the trackside barriers. A suspension problem on Jean-Marc Gounon's Team Oreca Audi dropped it to sixth overall, promoting Biela's No. 2 Champion vehicle to second. Gounon reclaimed fourth place by passing Vanina Ickx's No. 18 Rollcentre Dallara and Jan Lammers' No. 10 Racing for Holland Dome cars. Meanwhile, Alex Job driver Rockenfeller retook the lead of LMGT2 from White Lighting. Ron Fellows' No. 63 Corvette was passed for the lead of the LMGT1 category by Kox's No. 59 Aston Martin entering the first Mulsanne chicane in the seventh hour and Kox began to pull away from the rest of the class field.

Not long after, Donny Crevels' No. 85 Spyker C8 caught fire at its right rear due to a broken oil line spraying oil on its warm exhaust pipe. He retired after a high speed spin into a gravel trap at Indianapolis corner. The safety cars were needed a second time to give marshals 24 minutes to dry the spilled oil with cement dust. During the safety car period, the No. 34 Miracle Courage lost its left rear wheel at the pit lane exit and coasted backwards down a small hill before re-entering the pit lane. Turner was then given a third time penalty for overtaking another car under yellow flag conditions; the gap between Lieb's Alex Job Racing Porsche and Bernhard's White Lighting car in the first two positions in LMGT2 was 14 seconds. At midnight, Ayari's No. 17 Pescarolo C60 and Bobby Verdon-Roe's No. 8 Rollcentre Dallara cars collided at the first Mulsanne chicane, dropping Ayari to 14th while damage to the Pescarolo car was repaired.

Halliday and later Gregor Fisken twice brought the No. 32 Intersport Lola car from the LMP2 lead straight to the pit lane with a fuel injector problem. The team lost 15 minutes and the category lead to Paul Belmondon's No. 37 Courage car. Boullion's No. 16 Pescarolo C60 vehicle took fourth when driver John Bosch entered the pit lane for debris removal from the Racing for Holland Dome's car sidepod and radiator. Fuel injector problems on Andre's LMP2-class leading No. 37 Paul Belmondo Courage forced him into the garage for replacement fuel pump and filters, as the No. 32 Intersport Lola vehicle was retired with a broken engine valve. Andre lost his two-lap lead to Karim Ojjeh's sister No. 36 car and, later, Adam Sharpe. Werner's No. 3 Audi led his Champion teammate McNish by a lap as the race approached half distance after the No. 2 car made an unscheduled stop to replace a slow puncture. Comas returned to fifth when the No. 5 Jim Gainer Dome car's engine control unit was changed and fell to fourth.

=== Morning to early afternoon ===
Early in the morning, McNish's quick pace cut Kristensen's overall lead to less than a minute. After missing his braking point, Gounon lost control of the Team Oreca R8 and narrowly avoided hitting Kristensen at the Ford Chicane. Soon after, a tyre delamination sent McNish's Audi into a tyre barrier at Indianapolis, where it was beached in a gravel trap. After marshals recovered the Audi from the gravel, he returned to the track, but McNish drove straight to the garage. It took 18 minutes to repair the Audi's front-right suspension and rear bodywork. Boullion in the No. 17 Pescarolo car was promoted to second as the No. 2 Audi now driven by Biela fell to third place. Xavier Pompidou's No. 91 T2M Motorsport Porsche struck a tree at 190 km/h (120 mph) at Indianapolis corner after its left-rear wheel bearing failed before his braking point, forcing its retirement. Because the brunt of the impact damaged the car's right-hand corner, Pompidou was unharmed; he was transported from the circuit via a medical vehicle for a precautionary check-up. Kristsensen selected a gear too early in the No. 3 Audi and ran wide onto the grass at the second Mulsanne chicane; he kept the overall lead from Boullion's faster Pescarolo. The No. 36 Paul Belmondo Racing Courage car lost its four-lap lead in the LMP2 category to Erdos' No. 25 Ray Mallock Lola car because of an overheating issue.

At the first Mulsanne chicane, Campbell-Walter locked his front-left tyre on gravel and oil strewn across the track and collided with a tyre barrier. He drove the No. 13 Creation Autosportif DBA-Judd car to the garage for a new splitter, bodywork, and brake disc before rejoining the race in 20th after 1 hour and 10 minutes. Loeb brought the No. 16 Pescarolo into the pit lane for a three-minute stop to clear debris from the car's air intakes and bodywork after going off the track onto an escape road at Indianapolis corner. The No. 25 Ray Mallock MG-Lola lost the LMP2 lead to Andre in the No. 37 Paul Belmondo Courage vehicle due to a broken layshaft bearing that forced the car into the garage for 34 minutes, dropping it to third in the category. Soon after, Enge's No. 58 Aston Martin sustained front splitter damage. After a five-minute pit stop to repair the damage, the car lost the LMGT1 lead to Beretta's No. 64 Corvette. Stéphane Sarrazin's No. 59 Aston Martin also passed teammate Enge for second place in the category; despite a left-rear puncture, his pit stop did not lose him second in LMGT1.

In the 19th hour, Ayari, fifth, picked up a rear puncture on a bump at the first Mulsanne chicane. He spun through 90 degrees into a tyre wall, damaging the No. 17 Pescarolo car's rear wing, steering and suspension, as well as loosening its bodywork. Ayari slowed for almost an entire lap to enter the garage. Pescarolo were unable to repair the damage after half an hour and retired the car. The No. 17's retirement elevated John Stack's No. 9 Jota Zytek car to fifth overall. The Zytek car held fifth until Hignett understeered across a gravel trap at Indianapolis corner and collided with a tyre barrier. Marshals freed Hignett from the barrier, and the car returned to the track in eighth overall. The attrition rate among LMP1 cars promoted the LMGT1-leading No. 64 Corvette to fifth overall. Meanwhile, Erdos' No. 25 Ray Mallock MG-Lola car spun into a gravel trap at the Ford Chicane because of a right-rear suspension failure. Erdos was able to drive the car to the pit lane for repairs. With 90 minutes remaining, the No. 59 Aston Martin entered the garage to have a water leak in its radiator repaired, while Enge's No. 58 car retired after running out of fuel on track. After an unscheduled visit to the garage to have debris removed from the radiator, Boullion's No. 16 Pescarolo began to fall off the race pace. The debris was the result of duct grilles being opened to stop the car overheating.

=== Finish ===
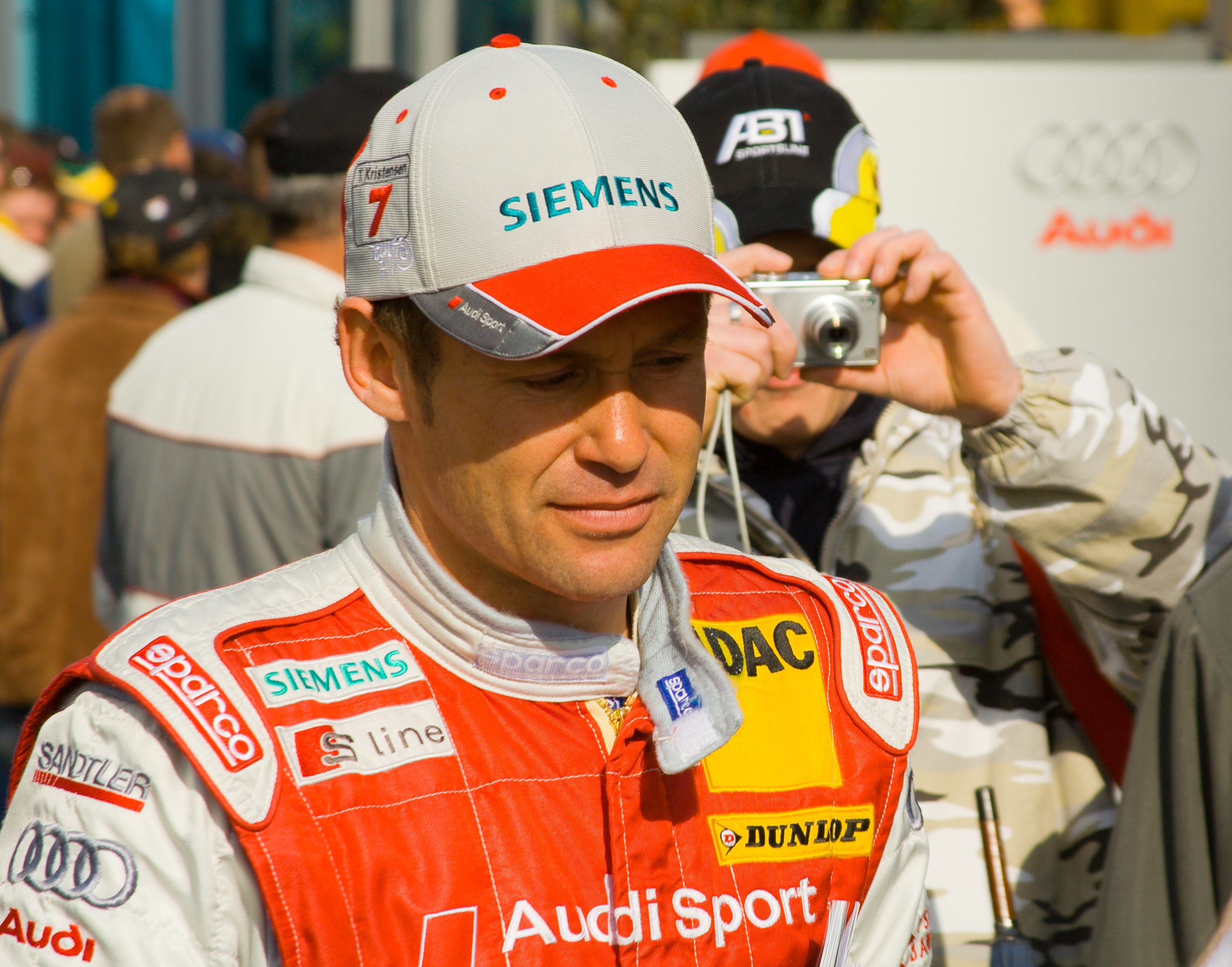
Tom Kristensen (pictured in 2006) took over from Jacky Ickx as the driver with the most overall victories at the 24 Hours of Le Mans.

Unchallenged since the race's third hour, Kristensen won for the No. 3 Audi team in a time of 24:01:30.901 at an average speed of 210.216 km/h (130.622 mph), two laps ahead of Boullion's No. 16 Pescarolo car. A further four laps separated the No. 2 Champion vehicle, which was third overall. Team Oreca, the final Audi vehicle, finished fourth, another two laps behind. It was Werner's first Le Mans victory, Lehto's second, and Kristensen's seventh since his first in 1997 and sixth in succession. Kristensen eclipsed Jacky Ickx's all-time record of six overall Le Mans wins, and Werner completed the Triple Crown of endurance racing (overall wins in the 24 Hours of Daytona, the 12 Hours of Sebring and the 24 Hours of Le Mans). It was also Audi's fifth overall victory and the last for the R8. The No. 64 Corvette maintained its two-lap advantage at the front of the LMGT1 field over the No. 63 car, earning the team their fourth class win. Aston Martin's No. 59 DBR9 completed the category podium in third. Alex Job won the LMGT2 category, unchallenged since gaining the class lead in the fifth hour of the race, two minutes ahead of White Lightning's No. 90 Porsche and seven laps ahead of Flying Lizard's No. 80 entry. The race for the LMP2 class victory continued into the final hour, with the Ray Mallock Lola car overtaking the two Paul Belmondo Courage vehicles after they experienced mechanical problems with 45 minutes remaining.

== Official results ==
The minimum number of laps for classification (75 per cent of the overall winning car's race distance) was 277 laps. Class winners are denoted with bold.

Final race classification
Pos	Class	No.	Team	Drivers	Chassis	Tyre	Laps	Time/Retired
Pos	Class	No.	Team	Drivers	Engine	Tyre	Laps	Time/Retired
1	LMP1	3	(United States) ADT Champion Racing	(Denmark) Tom Kristensen (Finland) JJ Lehto (Germany) Marco Werner	Audi R8	M	370	24:01:30.901
1	LMP1	3	(United States) ADT Champion Racing	(Denmark) Tom Kristensen (Finland) JJ Lehto (Germany) Marco Werner	Audi 3.6L Turbo V8	M	370	24:01:30.901
2	LMP1	16	(France) Pescarolo Sport	(France) Emmanuel Collard (France) Jean-Christophe Boullion (France) Érik Comas	Pescarolo C60 Hybrid	M	368	+2 Laps
2	LMP1	16	(France) Pescarolo Sport	(France) Emmanuel Collard (France) Jean-Christophe Boullion (France) Érik Comas	Judd GV5 5.0L V10	M	368	+2 Laps
3	LMP1	2	(United States) ADT Champion Racing	(Germany) Frank Biela (United Kingdom) Allan McNish (Italy) Emanuele Pirro	Audi R8	M	364	+6 Laps
3	LMP1	2	(United States) ADT Champion Racing	(Germany) Frank Biela (United Kingdom) Allan McNish (Italy) Emanuele Pirro	Audi 3.6L Turbo V8	M	364	+6 Laps
4	LMP1	4	(France) Audi PlayStation Team Oreca	(France) Franck Montagny (France) Jean-Marc Gounon (Monaco) Stéphane Ortelli	Audi R8	M	362	+8 Laps
4	LMP1	4	(France) Audi PlayStation Team Oreca	(France) Franck Montagny (France) Jean-Marc Gounon (Monaco) Stéphane Ortelli	Audi 3.6L Turbo V8	M	362	+8 Laps
5	GT1	64	(United States) Corvette Racing	(United Kingdom) Oliver Gavin (Monaco) Olivier Beretta (Denmark) Jan Magnussen	Chevrolet Corvette C6.R	M	349	+21 Laps
5	GT1	64	(United States) Corvette Racing	(United Kingdom) Oliver Gavin (Monaco) Olivier Beretta (Denmark) Jan Magnussen	Chevrolet LS7R 7.0L V8	M	349	+21 Laps
6	GT1	63	(United States) Corvette Racing	(Canada) Ron Fellows (Italy) Max Papis (United States) Johnny O'Connell	Chevrolet Corvette C6.R	M	347	+23 Laps
6	GT1	63	(United States) Corvette Racing	(Canada) Ron Fellows (Italy) Max Papis (United States) Johnny O'Connell	Chevrolet LS7R 7.0L V8	M	347	+23 Laps
7	LMP1	10	(Netherlands) Racing for Holland	(Netherlands) Jan Lammers (United States) Elton Julian (Netherlands) John Bosch	Dome S101	D	346	+24 Laps
7	LMP1	10	(Netherlands) Racing for Holland	(Netherlands) Jan Lammers (United States) Elton Julian (Netherlands) John Bosch	Judd GV4 4.0 L V10	D	346	+24 Laps
8	LMP1	12	(France) Courage Compétition	(Germany) Dominik Schwager (Switzerland) Alexander Frei (United Kingdom) Christian Vann	Courage C60H	Y	339	+31 Laps
8	LMP1	12	(France) Courage Compétition	(Germany) Dominik Schwager (Switzerland) Alexander Frei (United Kingdom) Christian Vann	Judd GV4 4.0L V10	Y	339	+31 Laps
9	GT1	59	(United Kingdom) Aston Martin Racing	(Australia) David Brabham (France) Stéphane Sarrazin (United Kingdom) Darren Turner	Aston Martin DBR9	M	333	+37 Laps
9	GT1	59	(United Kingdom) Aston Martin Racing	(Australia) David Brabham (France) Stéphane Sarrazin (United Kingdom) Darren Turner	Aston Martin 6.0L V12	M	333	+37 Laps
10	GT2	71	(United States) Alex Job Racing (United States) BAM! Motorsport	(Germany) Mike Rockenfeller (Germany) Marc Lieb (United States) Leo Hindery	Porsche 911 GT3-RSR	Y	332	+38 Laps
10	GT2	71	(United States) Alex Job Racing (United States) BAM! Motorsport	(Germany) Mike Rockenfeller (Germany) Marc Lieb (United States) Leo Hindery	Porsche 3.6L Flat-6	Y	332	+38 Laps
11	GT2	90	(United States) Petersen Motorsports (United States) White Lightning Racing	(Germany) Jörg Bergmeister (United States) Patrick Long (Germany) Timo Bernhard	Porsche 911 GT3-RSR	M	331	+39 Laps
11	GT2	90	(United States) Petersen Motorsports (United States) White Lightning Racing	(Germany) Jörg Bergmeister (United States) Patrick Long (Germany) Timo Bernhard	Porsche 3.6L Flat-6	M	331	+39 Laps
12	GT1	50	(France) Larbre Compétition	(France) Patrice Goueslard (France) Olivier Dupard (Belgium) Vincent Vosse	Ferrari 550-GTS Maranello	M	324	+46 Laps
12	GT1	50	(France) Larbre Compétition	(France) Patrice Goueslard (France) Olivier Dupard (Belgium) Vincent Vosse	Ferrari F133 5.9L V12	M	324	+46 Laps
13	GT2	80	(United States) Flying Lizard Motorsports	(United States) Johannes van Overbeek (United States) Lonnie Pechnik (United States) Seth Neiman	Porsche 911 GT3-RSR	M	323	+47 Laps
13	GT2	80	(United States) Flying Lizard Motorsports	(United States) Johannes van Overbeek (United States) Lonnie Pechnik (United States) Seth Neiman	Porsche 3.6L Flat-6	M	323	+47 Laps
14	LMP1	7	(United Kingdom) Creation Autosportif Ltd.	(France) Nicolas Minassian (United Kingdom) Jamie Campbell-Walter (United Kingdom) Andy Wallace	DBA 03S	M	322	+48 Laps
14	LMP1	7	(United Kingdom) Creation Autosportif Ltd.	(France) Nicolas Minassian (United Kingdom) Jamie Campbell-Walter (United Kingdom) Andy Wallace	Judd GV4 4.0L V10	M	322	+48 Laps
15	GT2	76	(France) IMSA Performance	(France) Raymond Narac (France) Sébastien Dumez (France) Romain Dumas	Porsche 911 GT3-RSR	M	322	+48 Laps
15	GT2	76	(France) IMSA Performance	(France) Raymond Narac (France) Sébastien Dumez (France) Romain Dumas	Porsche 3.6L Flat-6	M	322	+48 Laps
16	LMP1	18	(United Kingdom) Rollcentre Racing	(United Kingdom) Martin Short (Portugal) João Barbosa (Belgium) Vanina Ickx	Dallara SP1	M	318	+52 Laps
16	LMP1	18	(United Kingdom) Rollcentre Racing	(United Kingdom) Martin Short (Portugal) João Barbosa (Belgium) Vanina Ickx	Judd GV4 4.0L V10	M	318	+52 Laps
17	GT1	61	(United Kingdom) Cirtek Motorsport (Russia) Russian Age Racing (Russia) Convers Team	(Russia) Nikolai Fomenko (Russia) Alexey Vasilyev (France) Christophe Bouchut	Ferrari 550-GTS Maranello	M	315	+55 Laps
17	GT1	61	(United Kingdom) Cirtek Motorsport (Russia) Russian Age Racing (Russia) Convers Team	(Russia) Nikolai Fomenko (Russia) Alexey Vasilyev (France) Christophe Bouchut	Ferrari F133 5.9L V12	M	315	+55 Laps
18	GT2	72	(France) Luc Alphand Aventures	(France) Luc Alphand (France) Jérôme Policand (France) Christopher Campbell	Porsche 911 GT3-RS	M	311	+59 Laps
18	GT2	72	(France) Luc Alphand Aventures	(France) Luc Alphand (France) Jérôme Policand (France) Christopher Campbell	Porsche 3.6L Flat-6	M	311	+59 Laps
19	GT2	89	(United Kingdom) Sebah Automotive Ltd.	(Denmark) Lars-Erik Nielsen (Denmark) Thorkild Thyrring (Germany) Pierre Ehret	Porsche 911 GT3-RSR	D	307	+63 Laps
19	GT2	89	(United Kingdom) Sebah Automotive Ltd.	(Denmark) Lars-Erik Nielsen (Denmark) Thorkild Thyrring (Germany) Pierre Ehret	Porsche 3.6L Flat-6	D	307	+63 Laps
20	LMP2	25	(United Kingdom) Ray Mallock Ltd. (RML)	(Brazil) Thomas Erdos (United Kingdom) Mike Newton (United Kingdom) Warren Hughes	MG-Lola EX264	M	305	+65 Laps
20	LMP2	25	(United Kingdom) Ray Mallock Ltd. (RML)	(Brazil) Thomas Erdos (United Kingdom) Mike Newton (United Kingdom) Warren Hughes	Judd XV675 3.4L V8	M	305	+65 Laps
21	LMP2	36	(France) Paul Belmondo Racing	(Saudi Arabia) Karim A. Ojjeh (France) Claude-Yves Gosselin (United Kingdom) Adam Sharpe	Courage C65	M	300	+70 Laps
21	LMP2	36	(France) Paul Belmondo Racing	(Saudi Arabia) Karim A. Ojjeh (France) Claude-Yves Gosselin (United Kingdom) Adam Sharpe	Ford (AER) 2.0L Turbo I4	M	300	+70 Laps
22	LMP2	37	(France) Paul Belmondo Racing	(France) Didier André (France) Paul Belmondo (United States) Rick Sutherland	Courage C65	M	294	+76 Laps
22	LMP2	37	(France) Paul Belmondo Racing	(France) Didier André (France) Paul Belmondo (United States) Rick Sutherland	Ford (AER) 2.0L Turbo I4	M	294	+76 Laps
23	GT2	83	(Germany) Seikel Motorsport	(United States) Philip Collin (Canada) David Shep (Austria) Horst Felbermayr	Porsche 911 GT3-RSR	Y	274	+96 Laps
23	GT2	83	(Germany) Seikel Motorsport	(United States) Philip Collin (Canada) David Shep (Austria) Horst Felbermayr	Porsche 3.6L Flat-6	Y	274	+96 Laps
24	LMP2	30	(Germany) Kruse Motorsport	(United Kingdom) Tim Mullen (United Kingdom) Ian Mitchell (United Kingdom) Phil Bennett	Courage C65	P	268	+102 Laps
24	LMP2	30	(Germany) Kruse Motorsport	(United Kingdom) Tim Mullen (United Kingdom) Ian Mitchell (United Kingdom) Phil Bennett	Judd XV675 3.4L V8	P	268	+102 Laps
25 NC	LMP1	9	(United Kingdom) Team Jota (United Kingdom) Zytek Engineering Ltd.	(United Kingdom) Sam Hignett (United Kingdom) John Stack (Japan) Haruki Kurosawa	Zytek 04S	D	325	Incomplete final lap
25 NC	LMP1	9	(United Kingdom) Team Jota (United Kingdom) Zytek Engineering Ltd.	(United Kingdom) Sam Hignett (United Kingdom) John Stack (Japan) Haruki Kurosawa	Zytek ZG348 3.4L V8	D	325	Incomplete final lap
26 NC	GT2	95	(United Kingdom) Racesport Peninsula TVR	(United Kingdom) John Hartshorne (United Kingdom) Richard Stanton (United Kingdom) Piers Johnson	TVR Tuscan T400R	D	256	Insufficient distance
26 NC	GT2	95	(United Kingdom) Racesport Peninsula TVR	(United Kingdom) John Hartshorne (United Kingdom) Richard Stanton (United Kingdom) Piers Johnson	TVR Speed Six 4.0L I6	D	256	Insufficient distance
27 NC	LMP2	24	(France) Rachel Welter	(Japan) Yojiro Terada (France) Patrice Roussel (United States) William Binnie	WR LMP04	P	233	Insufficient distance
27 NC	LMP2	24	(France) Rachel Welter	(Japan) Yojiro Terada (France) Patrice Roussel (United States) William Binnie	Peugeot 2.0L Turbo I4	P	233	Insufficient distance
28 DNF	GT1	58	(United Kingdom) Aston Martin Racing	(Netherlands) Peter Kox (Portugal) Pedro Lamy (Czech Republic) Tomáš Enge	Aston Martin DBR9	M	327	Fuel system
28 DNF	GT1	58	(United Kingdom) Aston Martin Racing	(Netherlands) Peter Kox (Portugal) Pedro Lamy (Czech Republic) Tomáš Enge	Aston Martin 6.0L V12	M	327	Fuel system
29 DNF	LMP1	17	(France) Pescarolo Sport	(France) Soheil Ayari (France) Éric Hélary (France) Sébastien Loeb	Pescarolo C60 Hybrid	M	288	Accident damage
29 DNF	LMP1	17	(France) Pescarolo Sport	(France) Soheil Ayari (France) Éric Hélary (France) Sébastien Loeb	Judd GV5 5.0L V10	M	288	Accident damage
30 DNF	GT2	92	(United Kingdom) Cirtek Motorsport (Russia) Conversbank	(Sweden) Stefan Eriksson (United Kingdom) Joe Macari (New Zealand) Rob Wilson	Ferrari 360 Modena GTC	D	218	Wheel
30 DNF	GT2	92	(United Kingdom) Cirtek Motorsport (Russia) Conversbank	(Sweden) Stefan Eriksson (United Kingdom) Joe Macari (New Zealand) Rob Wilson	Ferrari F131 3.6L V8	D	218	Wheel
31 DNF	LMP1	5	(Japan) Jim Gainer International	(Japan) Ryō Michigami (Japan) Seiji Ara (Japan) Katsutomo Kaneishi	Dome S101Hb	D	193	Gearbox
31 DNF	LMP1	5	(Japan) Jim Gainer International	(Japan) Ryō Michigami (Japan) Seiji Ara (Japan) Katsutomo Kaneishi	Mugen MF408S 4.0L V8	D	193	Gearbox
32 DNF	GT2	78	(United States) Panoz Motor Sports	(France) Patrick Bourdais (United States) Bryan Sellers (United Kingdom) Marino Franchitti	Panoz Esperante GT-LM	P	185	Drivetrain
32 DNF	GT2	78	(United States) Panoz Motor Sports	(France) Patrick Bourdais (United States) Bryan Sellers (United Kingdom) Marino Franchitti	Ford (Élan) 5.0L V8	P	185	Drivetrain
33 DNF	LMP2	35	(Belgium) G-Force Racing / Bokkenrijders	(Netherlands) Val Hillebrand (Germany) Frank Hahn (United Kingdom) Gavin Pickering	Courage C65	D	183	Gearbox
33 DNF	LMP2	35	(Belgium) G-Force Racing / Bokkenrijders	(Netherlands) Val Hillebrand (Germany) Frank Hahn (United Kingdom) Gavin Pickering	Judd XV675 3.4L V8	D	183	Gearbox
34 DNF	GT2	91	(Japan) T2M Motorsport	(Japan) Yutaka Yamagishi (France) Xavier Pompidou (France) Jean-Luc Blanchemain	Porsche 911 GT3-RS	D	183	Accident
34 DNF	GT2	91	(Japan) T2M Motorsport	(Japan) Yutaka Yamagishi (France) Xavier Pompidou (France) Jean-Luc Blanchemain	Porsche 3.6L Flat-6	D	183	Accident
35 DNF	LMP1	8	(United Kingdom) Rollcentre Racing	(Germany) Michael Krumm (United Kingdom) Bobby Verdon-Roe (Switzerland) Harold Primat	Dallara SP1	M	133	Disqualified/Distance
35 DNF	LMP1	8	(United Kingdom) Rollcentre Racing	(Germany) Michael Krumm (United Kingdom) Bobby Verdon-Roe (Switzerland) Harold Primat	Nissan 3.6L Turbo V8	M	133	Disqualified/Distance
36 DNF	LMP2	32	(United States) Intersport Racing	(United States) Liz Halliday (United Kingdom) Sam Hancock (United Kingdom) Gregor Fisken	Lola B05/40	G	119	Exhaust
36 DNF	LMP2	32	(United States) Intersport Racing	(United States) Liz Halliday (United Kingdom) Sam Hancock (United Kingdom) Gregor Fisken	AER P07 2.0L Turbo I4	G	119	Exhaust
37 DNF	LMP2	34	(United States) Miracle Motorsports	(United States) John Macaluso (United Kingdom) Ian James (United States) Andy Lally	Courage C65	K	115	Disqualified/Reversing
37 DNF	LMP2	34	(United States) Miracle Motorsports	(United States) John Macaluso (United Kingdom) Ian James (United States) Andy Lally	AER P07 2.0L Turbo I4	K	115	Disqualified/Reversing
38 DNF	LMP2	31	(France) Noël del Bello Racing	(France) Romain Iannetta (Switzerland) Christophe Pillon (Portugal) Ni Amorim	Courage C65	M	99	Gearbox
38 DNF	LMP2	31	(France) Noël del Bello Racing	(France) Romain Iannetta (Switzerland) Christophe Pillon (Portugal) Ni Amorim	CG-Mecachrome 3.4L V8	M	99	Gearbox
39 DNF	GT1	69	(Monaco) JMB Racing	(France) Jean-René De Fournoux (France) Stéphane Daoudi (United States) Jim Matthews	Ferrari 575-GTC	P	84	Engine
39 DNF	GT1	69	(Monaco) JMB Racing	(France) Jean-René De Fournoux (France) Stéphane Daoudi (United States) Jim Matthews	Ferrari F133 6.0L V12	P	84	Engine
40 DNF	GT2	85	(Netherlands) Spyker Squadron b.v.	(Netherlands) Tom Coronel (Netherlands) Peter van Merksteijn (Netherlands) Donny Crevels	Spyker C8 Spyder GT2-R	D	76	Fire
40 DNF	GT2	85	(Netherlands) Spyker Squadron b.v.	(Netherlands) Tom Coronel (Netherlands) Peter van Merksteijn (Netherlands) Donny Crevels	Audi 3.8L V8	D	76	Fire
41 DNF	GT2	93	(United Kingdom) Scuderia Ecosse	(United Kingdom) Andrew Kirkaldy (United Kingdom) Nathan Kinch (United Kingdom) Anthony Reid	Ferrari 360 Modena GTC	P	70	Accident
41 DNF	GT2	93	(United Kingdom) Scuderia Ecosse	(United Kingdom) Andrew Kirkaldy (United Kingdom) Nathan Kinch (United Kingdom) Anthony Reid	Ferrari F131 3.6L V8	P	70	Accident
42 DNF	GT1	51	(Italy) BMS Scuderia Italia	(Italy) Fabrizio Gollin (Italy) Christian Pescatori (Portugal) Miguel Ramos	Ferrari 550-GTS Maranello	P	67	Accident
42 DNF	GT1	51	(Italy) BMS Scuderia Italia	(Italy) Fabrizio Gollin (Italy) Christian Pescatori (Portugal) Miguel Ramos	Ferrari F133 5.9L V12	P	67	Accident
43 DNF	GT1	52	(Italy) BMS Scuderia Italia	(Italy) Michele Bartyan (Italy) Matteo Malucelli (Switzerland) Toni Seiler	Ferrari 550-GTS Maranello	P	60	Accident damage
43 DNF	GT1	52	(Italy) BMS Scuderia Italia	(Italy) Michele Bartyan (Italy) Matteo Malucelli (Switzerland) Toni Seiler	Ferrari F133 5.9L V12	P	60	Accident damage
44 DNF	LMP2	23	(France) Gerard Welter	(France) Jean-Bernard Bouvet (Canada) Robert Julien (France) Sylvain Boulay	WR LMP04	P	53	Off course
44 DNF	LMP2	23	(France) Gerard Welter	(France) Jean-Bernard Bouvet (Canada) Robert Julien (France) Sylvain Boulay	Peugeot ES9J4S 3.4L V6	P	53	Off course
45 DNF	LMP1	13	(France) Courage Compétition	(France) Jonathan Cochet (Japan) Shinji Nakano (France) Bruce Jouanny	Courage C60H	Y	52	Accident
45 DNF	LMP1	13	(France) Courage Compétition	(France) Jonathan Cochet (Japan) Shinji Nakano (France) Bruce Jouanny	Judd GV4 4.0L V10	Y	52	Accident
46 DNF	LMP2	20	(France) Pir Competition	(France) Pierre Bruneau (France) Marc Rostan (France) Philippe Haezebrouck	Pilbeam MP93	M	32	Clutch
46 DNF	LMP2	20	(France) Pir Competition	(France) Pierre Bruneau (France) Marc Rostan (France) Philippe Haezebrouck	JPX 3.4L V6	M	32	Clutch
47 DNF	LMP2	39	(United Kingdom) Chamberlain-Synergy Motorsport	(United Kingdom) Bob Berridge (United Kingdom) Gareth Evans (United Kingdom) Peter Owen	Lola B05/40	D	30	Gearbox
47 DNF	LMP2	39	(United Kingdom) Chamberlain-Synergy Motorsport	(United Kingdom) Bob Berridge (United Kingdom) Gareth Evans (United Kingdom) Peter Owen	AER P07 2.0L Turbo I4	D	30	Gearbox
48 DNF	LMP2	33	(United States) Intersport Racing (United Kingdom) Cirtek Motorsport	(Denmark) Juan Barazi (Russia) Sergey Zlobin (France) Bastien Brière	Courage C65	M	30	Suspension
48 DNF	LMP2	33	(United States) Intersport Racing (United Kingdom) Cirtek Motorsport	(Denmark) Juan Barazi (Russia) Sergey Zlobin (France) Bastien Brière	AER P07 2.0L Turbo I4	M	30	Suspension
49 DNF	GT2	77	(United States) Panoz Motor Sports	(United States) Bill Auberlen (United Kingdom) Robin Liddell (Canada) Scott Maxwell	Panoz Esperante GT-LM	P	27	Engine
49 DNF	GT2	77	(United States) Panoz Motor Sports	(United States) Bill Auberlen (United Kingdom) Robin Liddell (Canada) Scott Maxwell	Ford (Élan) 5.0L V8	P	27	Engine

Tyre manufacturers
Key
Symbol	Tyre manufacturer
D	Dunlop
G	Goodyear
K	Kumho
M	Michelin
P	Pirelli
Y	Yokohama
