= Mike Newton (racing driver) =

British businessman and racing driver

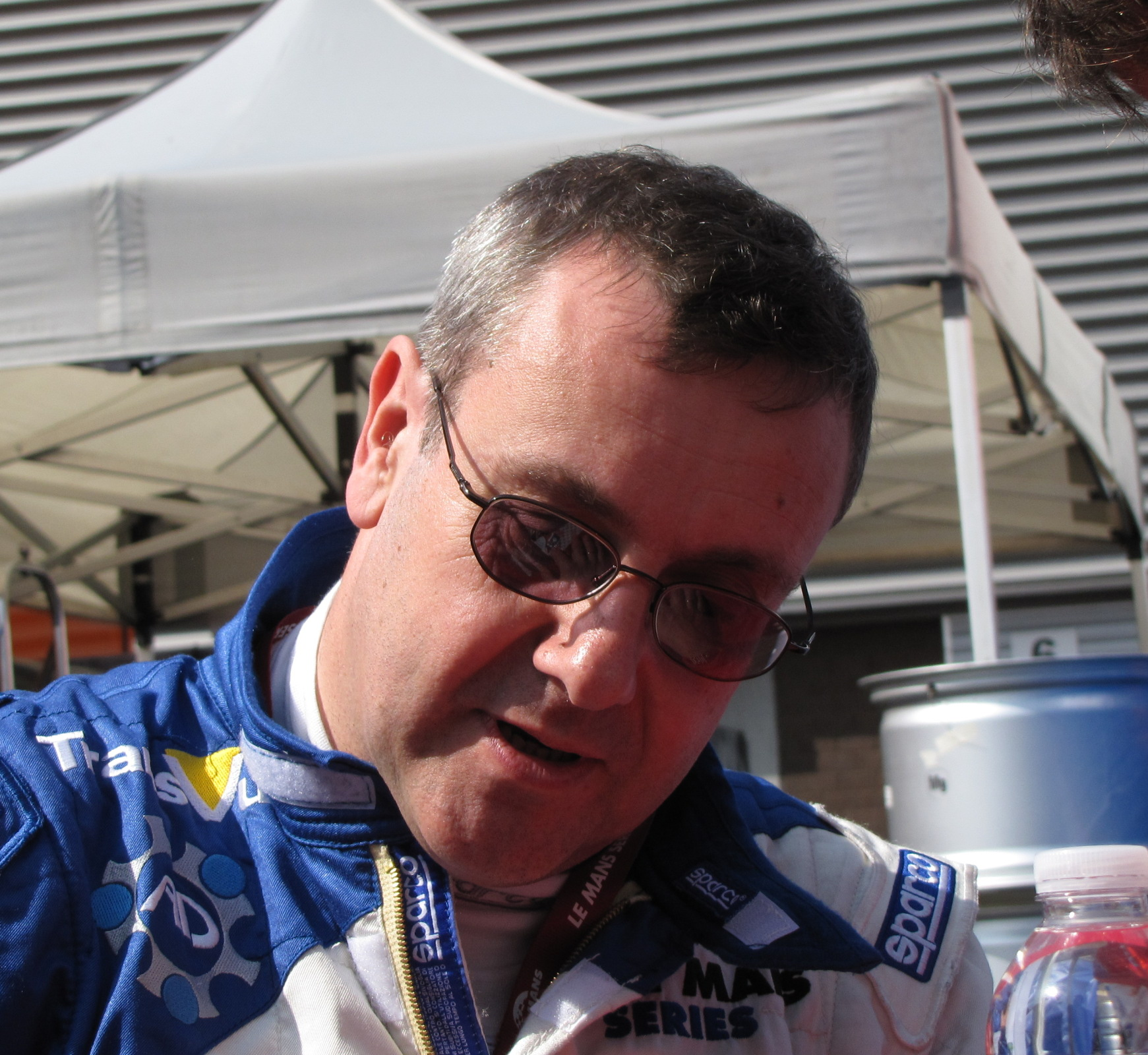
- Newton signing autographs at the 2009 1000 km of Spa
- Nationality: (United Kingdom) British
- Born: Michael James Newton; 14 April 1960 (age 66) Manchester, England
- Categorisation: FIA Silver (until 2015); FIA Bronze (2016–)
24 Hours of Le Mans career
- Years: 2003 – 2011
- Teams: GNM & RML
- Best finish: 8th (2006, 2010)
- Class wins: 2 (2005, 2006), LMS Titles 2 (2007, 2010)

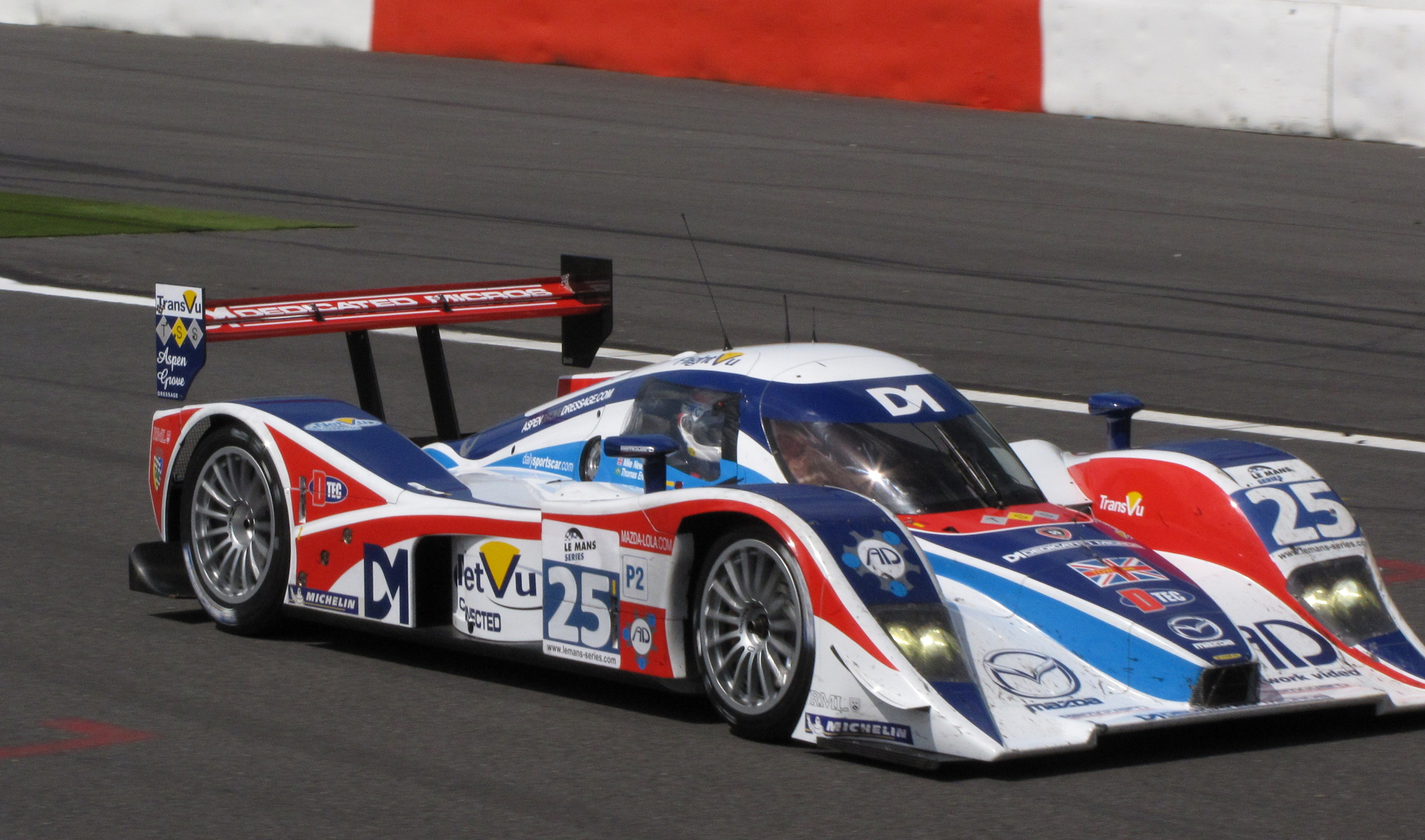
Newton driving at the 2009 1000 km of Spa.

Michael James Newton (born 14 April 1960 in Manchester) is a British businessman and racing driver. He is the founder and CEO of the AD Group of companies, which includes its solution arm AD Network Video. He raced in the Le Mans Series and 24 Hours of Le Mans in cars prepared by the RML Group. Newton was named Britain's Top Entrepreneur by Management Today magazine in 2005.

== Racing career ==
Newton began in motorsport as a marshal in 1977. In 1985, he took part in his first circuit race in Formula Ford. He was a regular competitor in Champion of Oulton Park Formula Ford series from 1985 through 1997, and had top-three championship finishes between 1995 and 1997. In 1999, he finished sixth in the Bathurst 500. In 2001, he finished first in class at the 6hr Langstreckenpokal (VLN) at the Nürburgring on the Nordschleife in an ex-Dick Johnson ATCC Falcon EL, and repeated that feat at the 2002 Grand Am Finale GTS Class in a Saleen S7R at Daytona.

In 2002, Newton made his GT debut at both the Daytona 24 Hours and British GT in a Porsche 996 GTR with Graham Nash Motorsport.

In 2003, Newton made his debut in the 24 Hours of Le Mans, racing a Saleen S7-R for Graham Nash Motorsport alongside Thomas Erdos and Pedro Chaves, the car being sponsored by some of Newton's companies. The team finished sixth in the GTS class. Newton and Erdos also raced the car in the FIA GT Championship.

For 2004, Newton and Erdos continued to race the Saleen in FIA GT for RML. They also raced in the Le Mans Series for the team in an MG-Lola EX257. They also raced the car at Le Mans, but retired from the race. In 2005, the team moved from the LMP1 category to the LMP2 category, winning the class at Le Mans and finishing second in the Le Mans Series. They repeated this feat in 2006. In 2007, Newton and Erdos won the Le Mans Series LMP2 category.

In 2010, Newton, Erdos and Wallace finished third in the LMP2 Class at Le Mans in a Lola HPD Coupe, and Newton and Erdos won the Le Mans Series LMP2 Drivers Title, with RML winning the LMP2 Team title, accompanied at different races by both Andy Wallace and Ben Collins.

In 2008, Newton was elected vice-president of the British Motorsport Marshals Club. Newton has been a BRDC member since 2008.

For 2012, Newton stepped back from the troubled ELMS series due to a lack of funding from ailing business interests, and undertook the development of a Speed Euroseries CN car, bringing the Tiga Race Cars name back to Sportscar racing with the Tiga CN012, leading the development activities, and also as a driver, partnered by Dean Stirling. Newton also made a one-off appearance in the Silverstone Classic in the Fujifilm Touring Cars race in a 1995 RML Group Super Touring Cavalier.

After a short break from racing, Newton returned in the MG-Lola EX257-AER #25 for the Masters Endurance Legends series, taking two class poles and two class wins in the Imola round in April 2018.

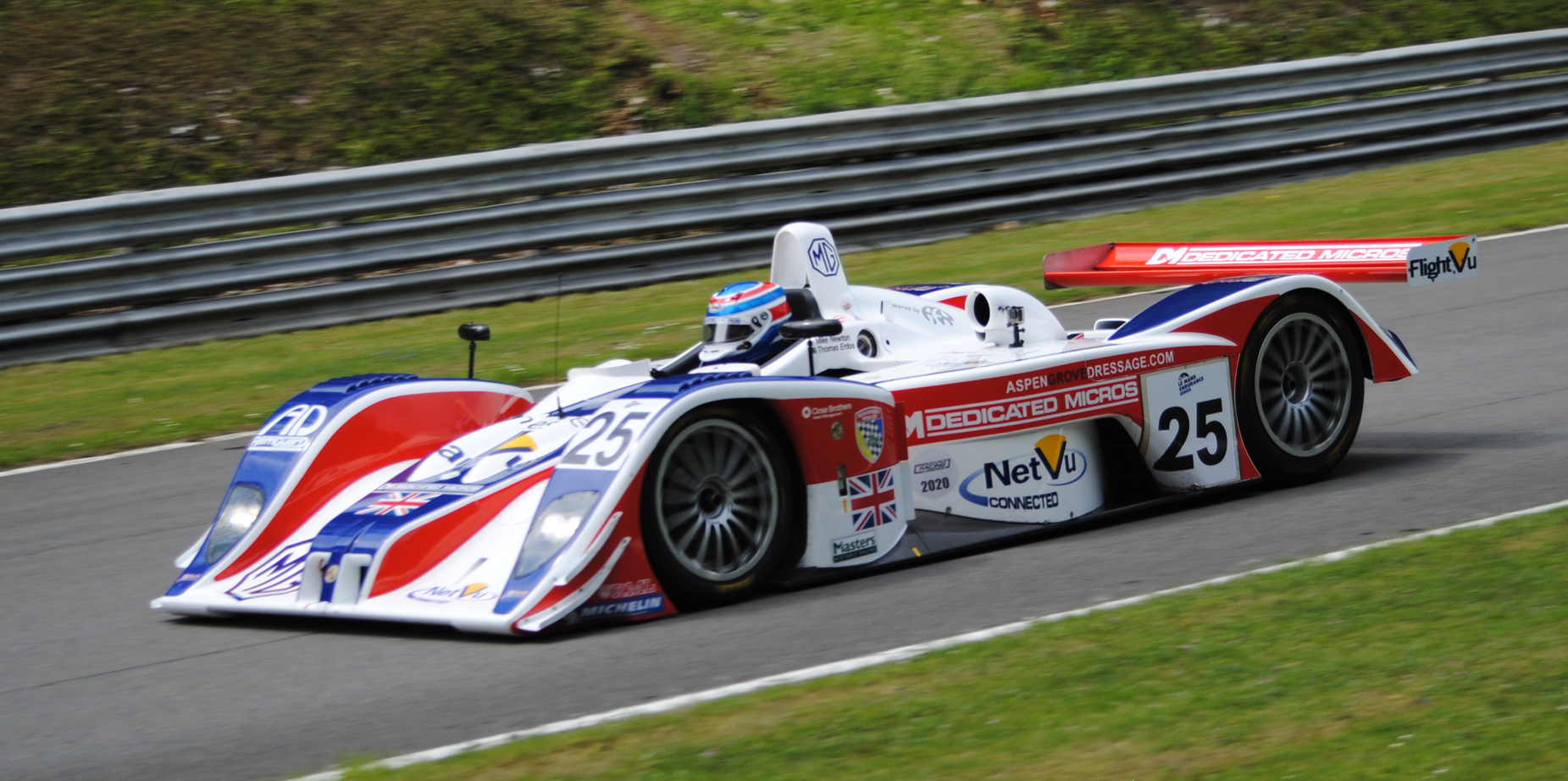
Newton competing in the Masters Endurance Legends at Brands Hatch.

Newton completed four rounds in the 2018 Master Endurance Legends, Imola, Silverstone, Nurburgring and Spa, achieving eight Class pole positions, eight fastest laps, and eight wins for LMP2 cars from 2000 to 2005. At the final round, he competed in at Spa; in race 1, he finished first LMP2 overall against cars of any era up to 2012, running as high as fourth overall in the second race. Newton still competes in the Masters Endurance Legends regularly with the EX257, having taken four class wins out of six races after the Silverstone Classic. He also took an overall podium and was the leading LMP2 car and in the two support races for the 2021 24 Hours of Le Mans in the same car, the EX257.

This was part of an impressive series of results in the Peter Auto Endurance Racing Legends delivering the following overall series results.

- 2020 – Peter Auto LMPB series runner up
- 2021 – Peter Auto LMPB series winner
- 2022 – Peter Auto LMP2B series winner
- 2023 – Peter Auto LMP2B series winner
- 2024 – Peter Auto LMP2B series winner
- 2025 – Peter Auto LMP2B series winner

The continuing participation in Masters Endurance Legends resulted in four outright podiums, 31 class wins from 19 events by the end of the 2023 season.

In 2023, six of the events were campaigned in the 2006 MG Lola EX264 HU003 which was the Le Mans 2006 24Hr class winner, and 2007 LMES LMP2 Series winner, with one outright race win, seven class wins and three overall podiums.

In 2026, the primary focus is in the MG Lola EX264 participating in the renamed Peter Auto series - the Le Mans Classic Series - and has started the season strongly with an outright win at Barcelona with LMP2 class victories in both races, and an overall third place on the podium, again with LMP2 class wins in both races, despite a much stronger entry.

== Career Results ==
=== Complete 24 Hours of Le Mans results ===
Year	Team	Co-Drivers	Car	Class	Laps	Pos.	Class Pos.
2003	(United Kingdom) Graham Nash Motorsport (United Kingdom) Ray Mallock Ltd.	(Brazil) Thomas Erdos (Portugal) Pedro Chaves	Saleen S7-R	GTS	292	28th	6th
2004	(United Kingdom) Ray Mallock Ltd.	(Brazil) Thomas Erdos (United Kingdom) Nathan Kinch	MG-Lola EX257-AER	LMP1	256	DNF	DNF
2005	(United Kingdom) Ray Mallock Ltd.	(Brazil) Thomas Erdos (United Kingdom) Warren Hughes	MG-Lola EX264-Judd	LMP2	305	20th	1st
2006	(United Kingdom) Ray Mallock Ltd.	(Brazil) Thomas Erdos (United Kingdom) Andy Wallace	MG-Lola EX264-AER	LMP2	343	8th	1st
2007	(United Kingdom) Ray Mallock Ltd.	(Brazil) Thomas Erdos (United Kingdom) Andy Wallace	MG-Lola EX264-AER	LMP2	251	DNF	DNF
2008	(United Kingdom) Ray Mallock Ltd.	(Brazil) Thomas Erdos (United Kingdom) Andy Wallace	MG-Lola EX265-AER	LMP2	100	DNF	DNF
2009	(United Kingdom) RML	(Brazil) Thomas Erdos (United States) Chris Dyson	Lola B08/86-Mazda	LMP2	273	DNF	DNF
2010	(United Kingdom) RML	(Brazil) Thomas Erdos (United Kingdom) Andy Wallace	Lola B08/80-HPD	LMP2	358	8th	3rd
2011	(United Kingdom) RML	(Brazil) Thomas Erdos (United Kingdom) Ben Collins	HPD ARX-01d	LMP2	314	12th	4th

=== Complete Bathurst 24 Hour results ===
Year	Team	Co-Drivers	Car	Class	Laps	Pos.	Class Pos.
2003	(United Kingdom) Graham Nash Motorsport	(Brazil) Thomas Erdos (Austria) Manfred Jurasz (Australia) Rod Wilson	Porsche 996 GT3-RS	A	280	30th	7th

Sporting positions
Preceded by Juan Barazi; Michael Vergers	Le Mans Series LMP2 Champion; 2007 with: Thomas Erdos	Succeeded by Jos Verstappen
Preceded by Miguel Amaral; Olivier Pla	Le Mans Series LMP2 Champion; 2010 with: Thomas Erdos	Succeeded by Tom Kimber-Smith; Karim Ojjeh
