= Thomas Erdos =

Brazilian racing driver (born 1963)

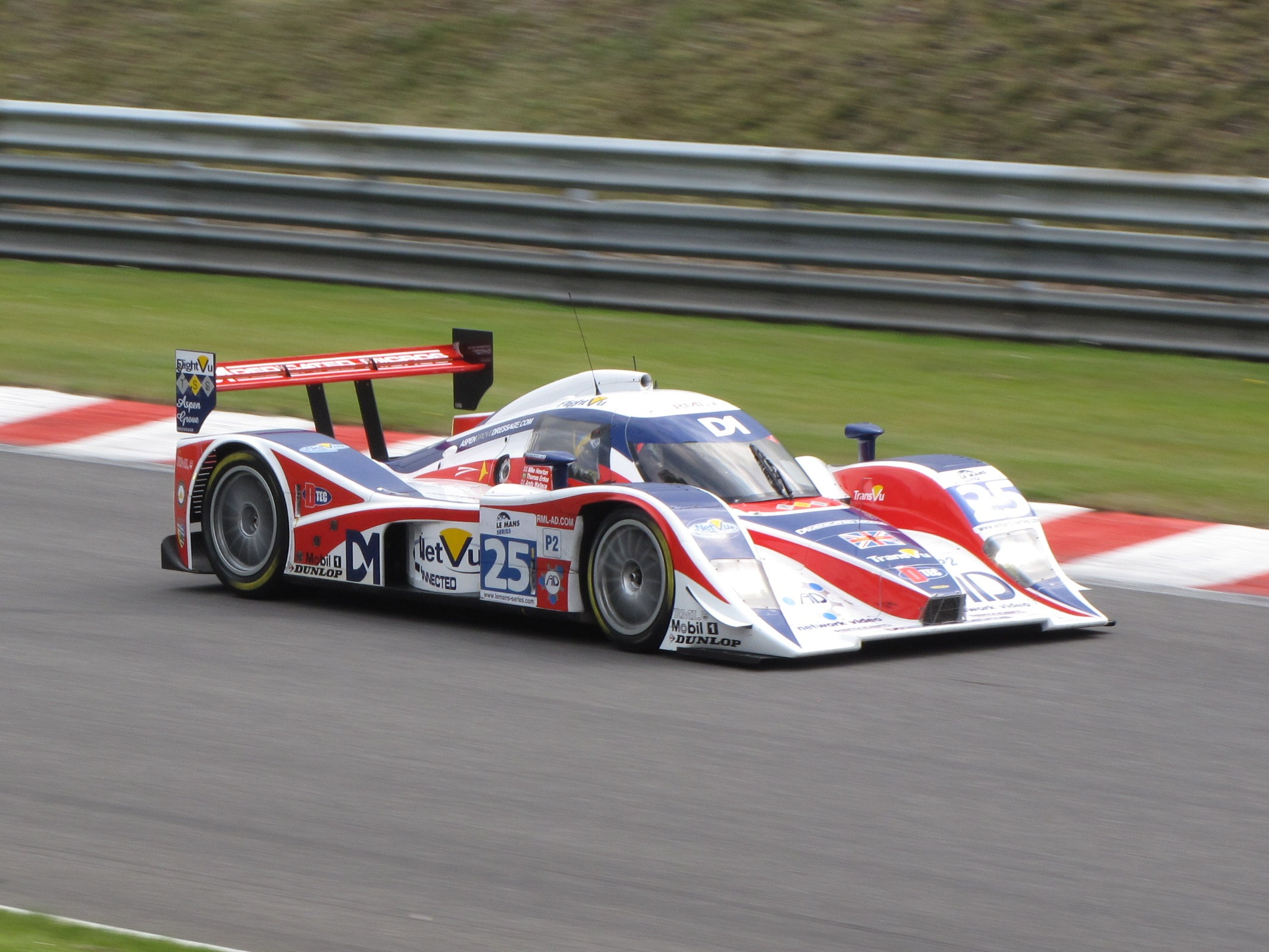
- Erdos in 2010
- Nationality: (Brazil) Brazilian
- Born: 30 October 1963 (age 63) Rio de Janeiro, Brazil
- Categorisation: FIA Gold (until 2013); FIA Silver (2014–2018); FIA Bronze (2019–)

Previous series
- 2003–04 2001 1995–2000, 2002, 2007, 2013: FIA GT; BTCC; British GT

Championship titles
- 2007, 2010 2002 1990: Le Mans Series (LMP2); British GT; Formula Renault UK

24 Hours of Le Mans career
- Years: 1995–1997, 1999, 2003–2011
- Teams: Team Marcos, Newcastle United Lister, Chamberlain Engineering, Graham Nash Motorsport, Ray Mallock Ltd.
- Best finish: 8th (2006, 2010)
- Class wins: 2 (2005, 2006)

Thomas "Tommy" Erdos (born 30 October 1963) is a Brazilian auto racing driver. A two-time Le Mans Series champion and 24 Hours of Le Mans winner in LMP2, he has raced for most of his career in Great Britain and Europe, where he currently resides in Buckinghamshire, England.

== Racing career ==
=== Early career ===
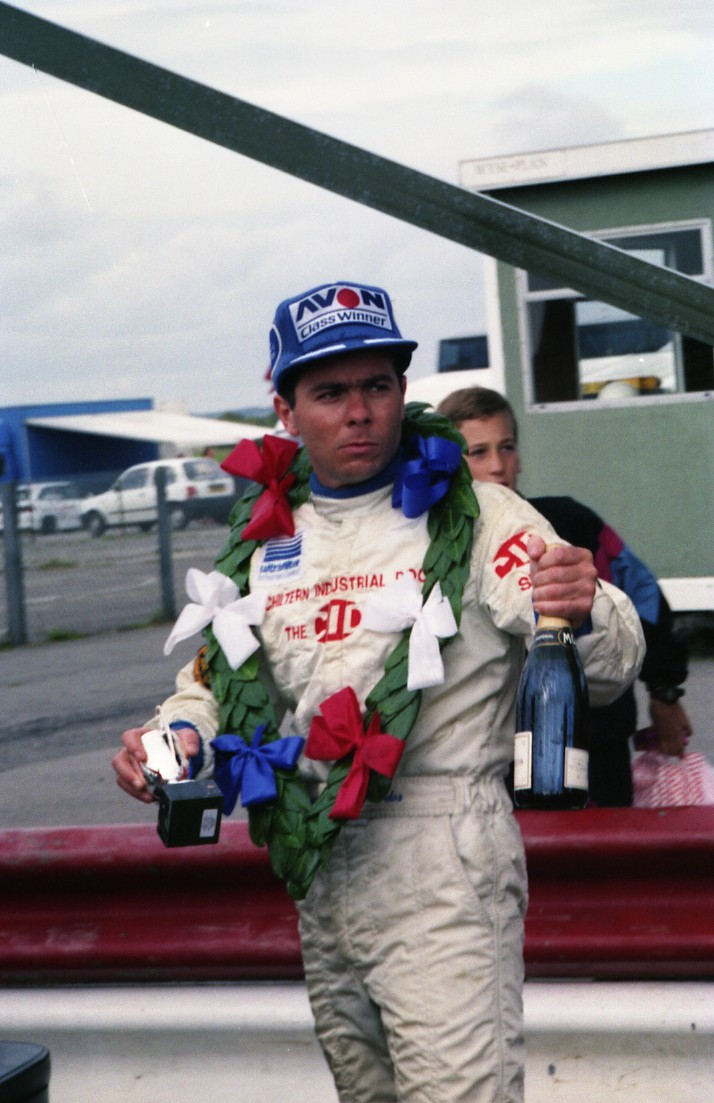
Thomas Erdos, Thruxton British F3 1994

Erdos' first racing was with single-seaters in 1988, in the British Formula First Championship. His impressive start to racing saw him finish as runner up in his first season, with eleven podiums, including five race wins. A year later, he raced in the Formula Ford 2000 Championship, finishing in third, with three race wins. In 1990, he stepped up to British Formula Renault. His nine podium finishes, including four race wins, was enough to win him the championship. Whilst testing for Formula Three at the end of the season, he was involved in a serious accident which left him out of racing for a whole year. At the time, he lived in Brant Broughton, when he raced for Fortec Motorsport.

Erdos returned to racing with some success in Formula Renault in 1992 and 1994, with a year in Formula 3 in-between. He also worked as an Instructor for the Jim Russell Racing School in 1993, for three years.

=== GT and Le Mans Part 1 ===
In 1995, Erdos moved into GT racing, driving a Marcos LM600, he drove in the BRDC GT Championship for Team Marcos. His first year in GTs saw him get four class wins, along with one outright win. This year also saw his first drive in the Le Mans 24 Hour race. Still with Team Marcos alongside Chris Hodgetts and Cor Euser, the race ended in retirement. A drive for Marcos Racing International in the BPR Global Endurance GT series, saw him finish third in the GT2 class at the end of the season in 1996. Again, his race in the Le Mans 24 Hour race ended in retirement with Cor Euser and Pascal Dro. In the BRDC GT Championship he drove in just a few selected races. For 1997, he first raced for Cirtek Motorsport in a Ford Saleen Mustang GT2, before switching to AJL Racing, where he drove a Jaguar XJ220 GT1, where he achieved four podium finishes. He also drove in two rounds of the FIA GT Championship for Cirtek Motorsport. Yet again his race in the Le Mans 24 Hour ended in a retirement. In 1998 he raced in several different cars in BRDC GT Championship, including a TVR Cerbera GT2, a Porsche 911 GT2 and finally back with a Marcos LM600 for NCK Racing, which he continued with in 1999 and 2000. Also in 1999, he finished in twenty-second place overall in the Le Mans 24 Hours. His Chrysler Viper GTS-R finished the race but struggled with mechanical problems. In 2000 he drove in one round of the ALMS at the Nürburgring, where he finished in second in a Chrysler Viper GTS-R for Chamberlain Motorsport.

=== BTCC ===
Erdos got a drive in the prestigious British Touring Car Championship in 2001. Originally the ABG Motorsport Team had planned to field two independent Lexus IS200s along with Kurt Luby. In the end, only one car raced all season, with Erdos replacing Luby halfway through the season. Despite driving in only twelve rounds from a total of twenty-six, he managed to impress many people by challenging with the works team and finishing the season in seventh place in points. He was lined up for a possible drive in the BTCC in 2007 for Xero Competition, but the team failed to raise the funds needed.

=== GT and Le Mans Part 2 ===
In January 2002, Erdos, together with Ian McKellar Jnr and Bobby Verdon-Roe, ran in the Daytona 24 Hours in a Saleen S7R entered by Graham Nash Motorsport (GNM). The car was so new that it ran in unpainted carbon fibre. Erdos was fastest in class in the early stages despite running against the formidable Jaguar of Paul Gentilozzi. However, alternator failures forced the team to 'park' the car after the opening few hours, using their remaining alternator to enable them to take the chequered flag by coming out to complete the final few laps.

For the 2002 season, Erdos was paired with Ian McKellar Jnr in the British GT championship driving the same Saleen S7R run by GNM, now painted white, with support from several AD Group companies together with Mouchel Metro and Renault trucks South West. The pair won the championship and Erdos won the Top Gun award for achieving pole position at every round.

In the same year Erdos, together with Pedro Chaves and Gavin Pickering, was entered in the Saleen at Le Mans by GNM.

Erdos began 2003 at Daytona in the Rolex 24 and then Erdos contested the FIA GT Championship in a Saleen S7R entered by GNM. His co-driver was Mike Newton and the car ran in the livery of Newton's AD Group of Companies. At Le Mans, the same car was run by Ray Mallock Ltd (RML) and Erdos' co drivers were Chaves and Newton. They failed to finish after a gearbox failure in the 24th hour.

Erdos competed in the one off 1000 km race run on the Bugatti circuit at Le Mans in November 2003 in an MG EX257 with co-drivers Chris Goodwin and Newton. The RML entry retired after 65 laps with mechanical failure.

Erdos was very busy in 2004 driving the MG EX257 in the inaugural Le Mans Endurance Series of 1000 km races together with Newton and Miguel Ramos and also sharing the Saleen with Newton in the FIA GT Championship. Both cars were run by RML. He finished fifth in LMP1 class of the LMES and sixth in the GT class of the FIA GT Championship. For Le Mans, he shared the MG with Newton and Nathan Kinch but a good run was ended by engine failure.

Erdos once again started the 2005 season at the Rolex 24 at Daytona resulting in a best finish of fourth in the DP class and seventh overall. At Le Mans, he shared the MG with Newton and Warren Hughes this time with Judd V8 power. A disastrous start with the car overheating on lap 1 and visiting the pits to have the cooling system bled and replenished left them last in class. However, a remarkable comeback with Hughes and Erdos setting fastest lap times throughout the night resulted in a class win by 4pm on Sunday. In the Le Mans Series, Erdos looked set to win the P2 class, but in the last round in Turkey, a startline incident involving Jean-Marc Gounon resulted in the MG making heavy contact with the pitwall. A remarkable feat of pit work by the RML crew saw the car rebuilt in record time. They rejoined the race and climbed back up the field to be beaten to the championship by one point.

For 2006, the MG returned to Le Mans with AER power and this time, class victory was achieved from the front. Sharing with Newton and Andy Wallace, Erdos finished eighth overall after an almost trouble free run. At the final round of the LMS series in Jarama, Spain, Erdos was once again heading for championship victory having dominated the class throughout the season. An engine failure minutes before the end of the race meant that, once again, he just missed out on the top prize.

Le Mans was less kind to Erdos in 2007, when retirement followed an accident in the Porsche Curves whilst Andy Wallace was driving. However, the LMS series finally came Erdos' way that season with victory in the P2 class.

== Racing record ==
=== Complete British GT Championship results ===
(key) (Races in bold indicate pole position) (Races in italics indicate fastest lap)

Year	Team	Car	Class	1	2	3	4	5	6	7	8	9	10	11	12	13	14	Pos	Points
1995	Marcos Cars	Marcos LM600	GT2	SIL; 1	DON; 1	DON; 2	SIL; 1	SIL; 2	THR; 1 Ret	**OUL**; **1**; 2	BRH; 1; 2	BRH; 2; 1	SNE; 1 DNS	SNE; 2 DNS	SIL; 1; 4			11th	23
1996	Marcos Racing International	Marcos LM600	GT2	SIL; 1; 1	DON; 1	BRH; 1	DON; 1	THR; 1; 1	SNE; 1	OUL; 1	SIL; 1							12th	46
1996	Marcos Racing International	Marcos LM500	GT3	SIL; 1	DON; 1	BRH; 1	DON; 1	THR; 1	SNE; 1	OUL; 1; 5	SIL; 1; 17							12th	26
1997	Cirtek Motorsport	Saleen Mustang	GT2	SIL; 1	BRH; 1	DON; 1	OUL; 1 DSQ	SIL; 1	CRO; 1	BRH; 1	DON; 1	SIL; 1						NC	0
1997	Saleen Allen Speedlab	Jaguar XJ220	GT1	SIL; 1	BRH; 1	DON; 1	OUL; 1	SIL; 1; 5	DON; 1; 8	BRH; 1; 7	CRO; 1; 6	SIL; 1; 4						11th	64
1998	Harrogate Horseless Carriages TVR	TVR Cerbera	GT2	SIL; 1	OUL; 1; 13	CRO; 1	SNE; 1 Ret	SIL; 1	DON; 1	SIL; 1	SPA; 1	SIL; 1						17th	53
1998	Gerard Macquillan	Porsche 911 GT2	GT2	SIL; 1	OUL; 1	CRO; 1	SNE; 1	SIL; 1 NC	DON; 1	SIL; 1	SPA; 1	SIL; 1						17th	53
1998	NCK Racing	Marcos LM600	GT2	SIL; 1	OUL; 1	CRO; 1	SNE; 1	SIL; 1	DON; 1 Ret	SIL; 1; 6	SPA; 1; 5	SIL; 1; 6						17th	53
1999	Marcos Cars/NCK Motorsport	Marcos LM600	GT2	**SIL**; **1**; 9	SIL; 1; 8	**SNE**; **1** Ret	BRH; 1; 7	SIL; 1; 7	DON; 1 Ret	DON; 2; 6	**SIL**; **1** Ret	CRO; 1 Ret	**SPA**; **1** Ret	**SIL**; **1**; 4				8th	78
2000	NCK Motorsport	Marcos LM600	GT	THR; 1 DNS	CRO; 1 Ret	OUL; 1 Ret	DON; 1 Ret	SIL; 1; 8	BRH; 1; 6	DON; 1 Ret	**CRO**; **1**; 3	SIL; 1; 4	SNE; 1 Ret	SPA; 1 Ret	SIL; 1; 8			16th	33
2002	Graham Nash Motorsport	Saleen S7-R	GT	**BRH**; **1**; 1	**DON**; **1** Ret	**SIL**; **1**; 1	KNO; 1; 1	**CRO**; **1**; 1	SIL; 1; 1	CAS; 1; 2	**ROC**; **1**; 1	OUL; 1; 1	SNE; 1; 2	THR; 1; 1	**DON**; **1**; 2			1st	260
2003	Rollcentre with Balfe Motorsport	Mosler MT900R	GTO	DON; 1	SNE; 1	KNO; 1	KNO; 2	SIL; 1	CAS; 1	OUL; 1	ROC; 1	THR; 1	SPA; 1; 8	BRH; 1				34th	20
2007	Damax	Ascari KZ1-R	GT3	OUL; 1; 21†	OUL; 2 Ret	DON; 1; 10†	DON; 2; 7	SNE; 1	BRH; 1; 13	BRH; 2; 8	SIL; 1 Ret	THR; 1 Ret	THR; 2; 16	CRO; 1	CRO; 2	ROC; 1; 14	ROC; 2; 8	25th	4
2013	Balfe Motorsport	Ferrari 458 Italia GT3	GT3	OUL; 1	OUL; 2	ROC; 1; 10	SIL; 1	SNE; 1	SNE; 2	BRH; 1	ZAN; 1	ZAN; 2	DON; 1					32nd	1.5

† — Drivers did not finish the race, but were classified as they completed over 90% of the race distance.

=== Complete British Touring Car Championship results ===
(key) (Races in bold indicate pole position – 1 point awarded all races) (Races in italics indicate fastest lap – 1 point awarded all races) (* signifies that driver lead feature race for at least one lap – 1 point awarded)

Year	Team	Car	Class	1	2	3	4	5	6	7	8	9	10	11	12	13	14	15	16	17	18	19	20	21	22	23	24	25	26	Pos	Pts
2001	ABG Motorsport	Lexus IS200	T	BRH; 1	BRH; 2	THR; 1	THR; 2	OUL; 1	OUL; 2	SIL; 1	SIL; 2	MON; 1	MON; 2	DON; 1	DON; 2	KNO; 1 ovr:8 cls:4	KNO; 2 Ret	SNE; 1 ovr:11 cls:4	SNE; 2 ovr:5 cls:5	CRO; 1 ovr:8 cls:4	CRO; 2 ovr:4 cls:4									7th	72
2001	Total Motorsport	Lexus IS200	T																			OUL; 1 ovr:11 cls:6	OUL; 2 ovr:6* cls:6	SIL; 1 ovr:14 cls:7	SIL; 2 ovr:6 cls:6	DON; 1 ovr:14 cls:8	DON; 2 ovr:4 cls:4	BRH; 1	BRH; 2	7th	72

=== 24 Hours of Le Mans results ===
Year	Team	Co-Drivers	Car	Class	Laps	Pos.	Class Pos.
1995	(United Kingdom) Team Marcos	(Netherlands) Cor Euser (United Kingdom) Chris Hodgetts	Marcos Mantara LM600	GT2	133	DNF	DNF
1996	(United Kingdom) Team Marcos	(Netherlands) Cor Euser (France) Pascal Dro	Marcos Mantara LM600	GT2	40	DNF	DNF
1997	(United Kingdom) Newcastle United Lister	(United Kingdom) Julian Bailey (Australia) Mark Skaife	Lister Storm GTL	GT1	77	DNF	DNF
1999	(United Kingdom) Chamberlain Engineering	(United Kingdom) Christian Vann (Germany) Christian Gläsel	Chrysler Viper GTS-R	GTS	270	22nd	9th
2003	(United Kingdom) Graham Nash Motorsport (United Kingdom) Ray Mallock Ltd.	(United Kingdom) Mike Newton (Portugal) Pedro Chaves	Saleen S7-R	GTS	292	28th	6th
2004	(United Kingdom) Ray Mallock Ltd.	(United Kingdom) Mike Newton (United Kingdom) Nathan Kinch	MG-Lola EX257-AER	LMP1	256	DNF	DNF
2005	(United Kingdom) Ray Mallock Ltd.	(United Kingdom) Mike Newton (United Kingdom) Warren Hughes	MG-Lola EX264-Judd	LMP2	305	20th	**1st**
2006	(United Kingdom) Ray Mallock Ltd.	(United Kingdom) Mike Newton (United Kingdom) Andy Wallace	MG-Lola EX264-AER	LMP2	343	8th	**1st**
2007	(United Kingdom) Ray Mallock Ltd.	(United Kingdom) Mike Newton (United Kingdom) Andy Wallace	MG-Lola EX264-AER	LMP2	251	DNF	DNF
2008	(United Kingdom) Ray Mallock Ltd.	(United Kingdom) Mike Newton (United Kingdom) Andy Wallace	MG-Lola EX265-AER	LMP2	100	DNF	DNF
2009	(United Kingdom) RML	(United Kingdom) Mike Newton (United States) Chris Dyson	Lola B08/86-Mazda	LMP2	273	DNF	DNF
2010	(United Kingdom) RML	(United Kingdom) Mike Newton (United Kingdom) Andy Wallace	Lola B08/80-HPD	LMP2	358	8th	**3rd**
2011	(United Kingdom) RML	(United Kingdom) Mike Newton (United Kingdom) Ben Collins	HPD ARX-01d	LMP2	314	12th	4th

Sporting positions
Preceded by Neil Riddiford	British Formula Renault; UK series champion 1990	Succeeded by Bobby Verdon-Roe
Preceded by Mike Jordan; David Warnock	British GT Champion; 2002 with: Ian MacKellar	Succeeded by Tom Herridge
Preceded by Juan Barazi; Michael Vergers	Le Mans Series LMP2 Champion; 2007 with: Mike Newton	Succeeded by Jos Verstappen
Preceded by Miguel Amaral; Olivier Pla	Le Mans Series LMP2 Champion; 2010 with: Mike Newton	Succeeded by Tom Kimber-Smith; Karim Ojjeh
