= Zytek 07S =

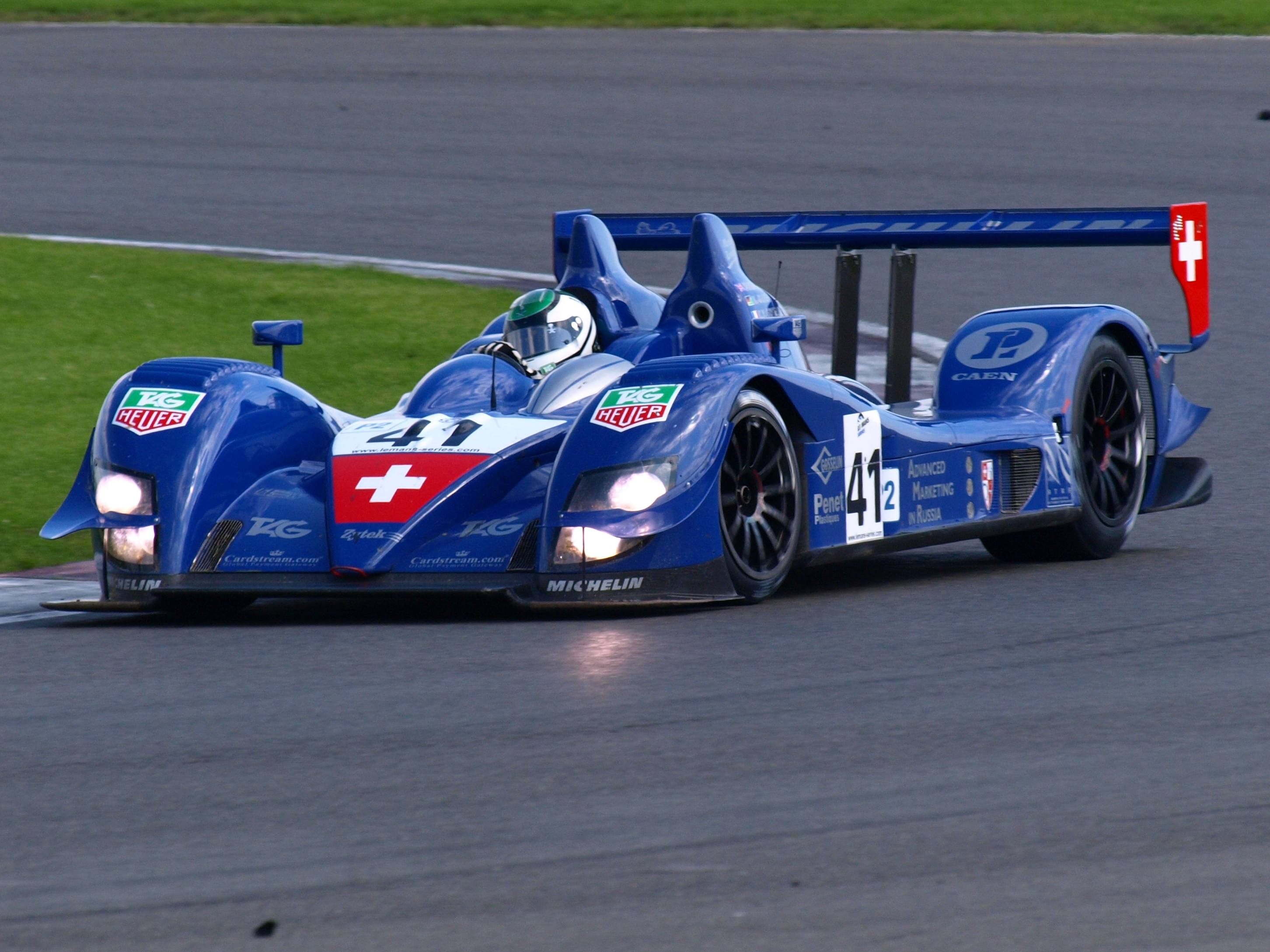
Zytek 07S

The Zytek 07S is a sports prototype race car, designed, developed and built by British manufacturer Zytek, to compete in the LMP1 class in sports car racing, in 2007. The Zytek 07S/2 is the LMP2-class version of the same car. It is the successor of the Zytek 04S. The chassis evolved in 2009 and took the name Ginetta-Zytek GZ09S following the merger between Ginetta and Zytek who have a common shareholder in the person of Lawrence Tomlinson.

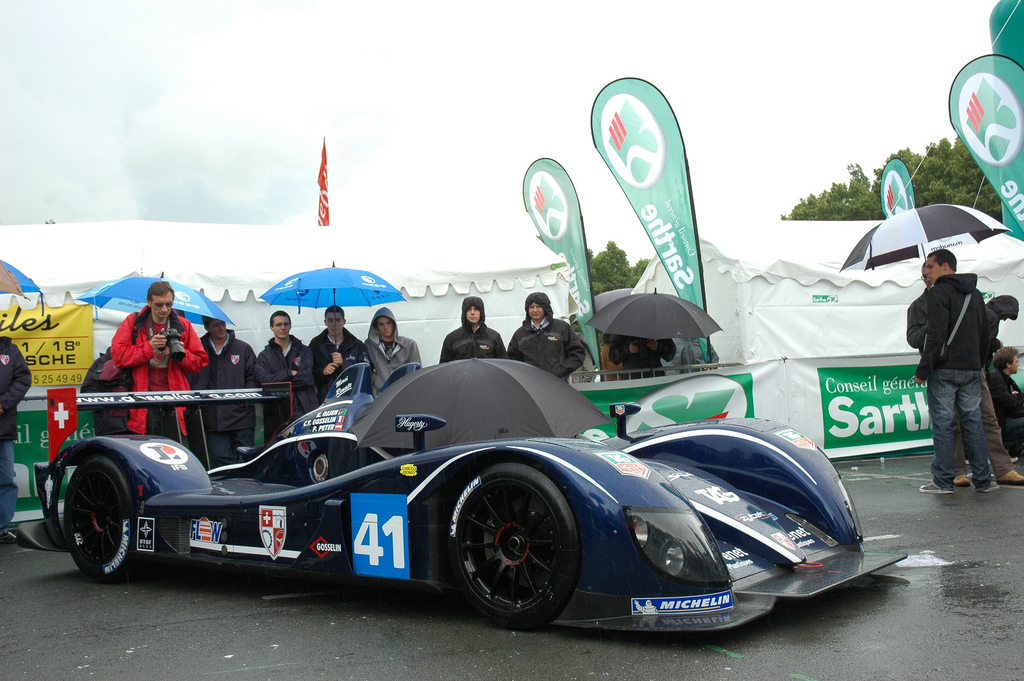
The GAC Racing Team 07S in 2009

== Race history ==
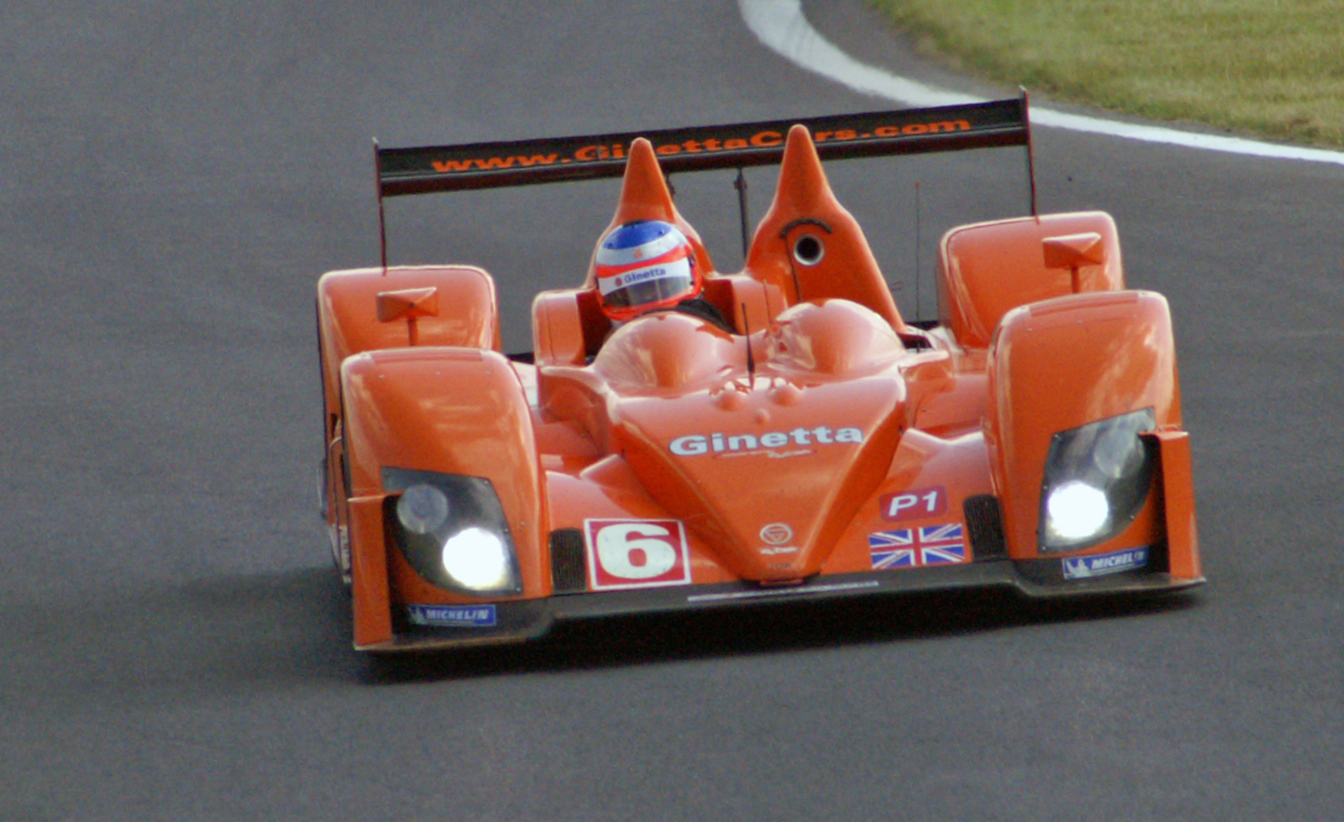
Team LNT 's 09S in 2009

=== Le Mans Series 2007 ===
- Victory in the LMP2 category at the 1,000 kilometers of Silverstone with Barazi-Epsilon
- Victory in the LMP2 category at the Mil Milhas Brasil with Barazi-Epsilon

=== Le Mans Series 2009 ===
- Champion in the LMP2 category with the Quifel ASM Team
- Victory in the LMP2 category at the Algarve 1,000 kilometers with the Quifel ASM Team
- Victory in the LMP2 category at the 1,000 kilometers of the Nürburgring with the Quifel ASM Team

=== Le Mans Series 2010 ===
- Victory in the LMP2 category at the 1,000 kilometers of Spa with the Quifel ASM Team
- 2nd in the Hungaroring 1,000 kilometers with the Quifel ASM Team
- Victory in the LMP1 category at the Hungaroring 1,000 kilometers with Beechdean Mansell Motorsport

=== Le Mans Series 2011 ===
- Champion in the LMP2 category with Greaves Motorsport
- 3rd and victory in the LMP2 category at the 6 Hours of Le Castellet with Greaves Motorsport
- Victory in the LMP2 category at the 6 Hours of Imola with Greaves Motorsport
- Victory in the LMP2 category at the 6 Hours of Silverstone with Greaves Motorsport

=== 24 hours of Le Mans ===
- Victory in the LMP2 category at the 2011 24 Hours of Le Mans with Greaves Motorsport
