= Courage C65 =

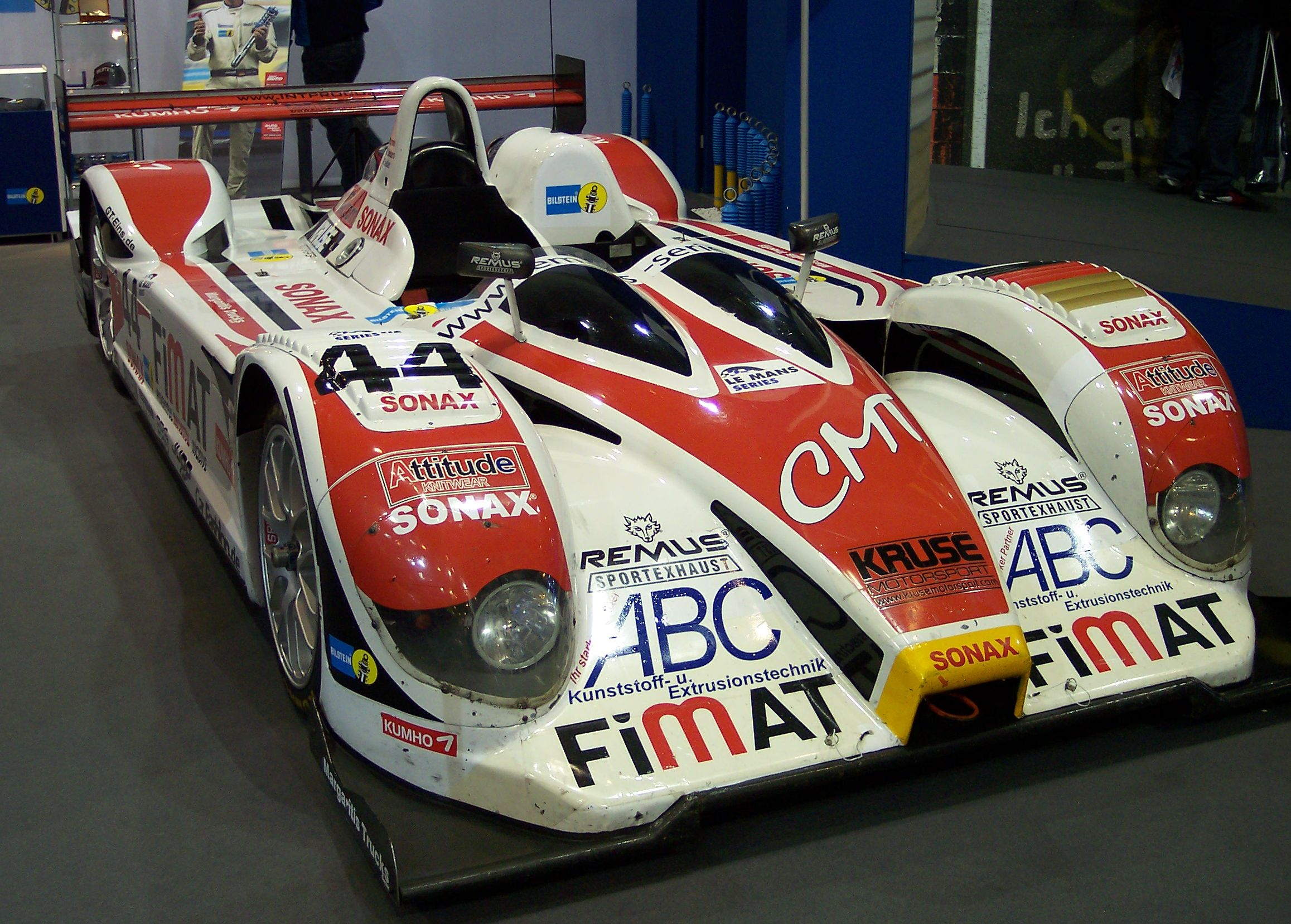
- Category: LMP675/LMP2
- Constructor: Courage Compétition
- Designer(s): Paolo Catone (original)
- Production: 2003-2006

Technical specifications
- Chassis: Carbon fibre and aluminium honeycomb monocoque
- Suspension (front): Double wishbone, pushrods and horizontally-located dynamic shock absorbers
- Suspension (rear): Double wishbone, pushrods and horizontally-located dynamic shock absorbers
- Length: 4,650 mm (183.1 in)
- Width: 1,970 mm (77.6 in)
- Axle track: 1,750 mm (68.9 in) (front); 1,600 mm (63.0 in) (rear)
- Wheelbase: 2,790 mm (109.8 in)
- Engine: Judd XV675 3,397 cc (207.3 cu in) 32-valve, DOHC V8, naturally-aspirated, mid-mounted, rear wheel drive Mecachrome-Ford 3,398 cc (207.4 cu in) 32-valve, DOHC V8, naturally-aspirated, rear wheel drive Ford-AER 1,995 cc (121.7 cu in) 16-valve, DOHC I4, turbocharged, mid-mounted, rear wheel drive AER P07/MG XP-20 (Rover K-series) 1,995 cc (121.7 cu in) 16-valve, DOHC I4, turbocharged, mid-mounted, rear wheel drive
- Transmission: Hewland TLS 6-speed sequential manual
- Power: 500–550 hp (370–410 kW)
- Weight: 738–791 kg (1,627–1,744 lb)
- Brakes: Carbon or steel disc brakes
- Tyres: Pirelli; Michelin; Goodyear; Yokohama

Competition history

The Courage C65 was a Le Mans Prototype (LMP) race car, designed, developed, and built by French constructor Courage in 2003, and used in international sports car races until 2006.
