= 2005 1000 km of Nürburgring =

Sports car endurance race in Germany

Nürburgring

The 2005 1000 km of Nürburgring was the fourth round of the 2005 Le Mans Series season, held at the Nürburgring, Germany. It was run on September 4, 2005.

== Official results ==
Class winners in bold. Cars failing to complete 70% of winner's distance marked as Not Classified (NC).

Pos	Class	No	Team	Drivers	Chassis	Tyre	Laps
Pos	Class	No	Team	Drivers	Engine	Tyre	Laps
1	**LMP1**	**15**	**(United Kingdom) Zytek Motorsport**	**(United Kingdom) Tom Chilton (Japan) Hayanari Shimoda**	**Zytek 04S**	MI	**193**
1	**LMP1**	**15**	**(United Kingdom) Zytek Motorsport**	**(United Kingdom) Tom Chilton (Japan) Hayanari Shimoda**	**Zytek ZG348 3.4L V8**	MI	**193**
2	LMP1	4	(France) Audi PlayStation Team Oreca	(Monaco) Stéphane Ortelli (United Kingdom) Allan McNish	Audi R8	MI	193
2	LMP1	4	(France) Audi PlayStation Team Oreca	(Monaco) Stéphane Ortelli (United Kingdom) Allan McNish	Audi 3.6L Turbo V8	MI	193
3	LMP1	7	(United Kingdom) Creation Autosportif	(France) Nicolas Minassian (United Kingdom) Jamie Campbell-Walter	DBA 03S	MI	193
3	LMP1	7	(United Kingdom) Creation Autosportif	(France) Nicolas Minassian (United Kingdom) Jamie Campbell-Walter	Judd GV5 5.0L V10	MI	193
4	LMP1	17	(France) Pescarolo Sport	(France) Emmanuel Collard (France) Jean-Christophe Boullion	Pescarolo C60 Hybrid	MI	192
4	LMP1	17	(France) Pescarolo Sport	(France) Emmanuel Collard (France) Jean-Christophe Boullion	Judd GV5 5.0L V10	MI	192
5	LMP1	8	(United Kingdom) Rollcentre Racing	(United Kingdom) Martin Short (Portugal) João Barbosa (Belgium) Vanina Ickx	Dallara SP1	MI	187
5	LMP1	8	(United Kingdom) Rollcentre Racing	(United Kingdom) Martin Short (Portugal) João Barbosa (Belgium) Vanina Ickx	Judd GV4 4.0L V10	MI	187
6	LMP1	9	(United Kingdom) Team Jota	(United Kingdom) Sam Hignett (United Kingdom) John Stack (United Kingdom) Gregor Fisken	Zytek 04S	D	185
6	LMP1	9	(United Kingdom) Team Jota	(United Kingdom) Sam Hignett (United Kingdom) John Stack (United Kingdom) Gregor Fisken	Zytek ZG348 3.4L V8	D	185
7	**LMP2**	**27**	**(Switzerland) Horag Lista Racing**	**(Belgium) Eric van de Poele (Belgium) Didier Theys**	**Lola B05/40**	MI	**184**
7	**LMP2**	**27**	**(Switzerland) Horag Lista Racing**	**(Belgium) Eric van de Poele (Belgium) Didier Theys**	**Judd XV675 3.4L V8**	MI	**184**
8	LMP1	13	(France) Courage Compétition	(Switzerland) Alexander Frei (France) Jonathan Cochet (United Kingdom) Christian Vann	Courage C60 Hybrid	Y	183
8	LMP1	13	(France) Courage Compétition	(Switzerland) Alexander Frei (France) Jonathan Cochet (United Kingdom) Christian Vann	Judd GV4 4.0L V10	Y	183
9	**GT1**	**62**	**(Russia) Convers Team (United Kingdom) Cirtek Motorsport**	**(United Kingdom) Darren Turner (Switzerland) Frédéric Dor (United Kingdom) Bobby Bell**	**Aston Martin DBR9**	MI	**179**
9	**GT1**	**62**	**(Russia) Convers Team (United Kingdom) Cirtek Motorsport**	**(United Kingdom) Darren Turner (Switzerland) Frédéric Dor (United Kingdom) Bobby Bell**	**Aston Martin 6.0L V12**	MI	**179**
10	GT1	52	(Italy) BMS Scuderia Italia	(Italy) Matteo Cressoni (United Kingdom) Jamie Davies (Portugal) Miguel Ramos	Ferrari 550-GTS Maranello	P	178
10	GT1	52	(Italy) BMS Scuderia Italia	(Italy) Matteo Cressoni (United Kingdom) Jamie Davies (Portugal) Miguel Ramos	Ferrari 5.9L V12	P	178
11	GT1	51	(Italy) BMS Scuderia Italia	(Italy) Michele Bartyan (Italy) Christian Pescatori (Switzerland) Toni Seiler	Ferrari 550-GTS Maranello	P	178
11	GT1	51	(Italy) BMS Scuderia Italia	(Italy) Michele Bartyan (Italy) Christian Pescatori (Switzerland) Toni Seiler	Ferrari 5.9L V12	P	178
12	GT1	67	(Czech Republic) MenX Racing	(Czech Republic) Robert Pergl (Czech Republic) Jaroslav Janiš (Netherlands) Peter Kox	Ferrari 550-GTS Maranello	MI	178
12	GT1	67	(Czech Republic) MenX Racing	(Czech Republic) Robert Pergl (Czech Republic) Jaroslav Janiš (Netherlands) Peter Kox	Ferrari 5.9L V12	MI	178
13	LMP2	37	(France) Paul Belmondo Racing	(France) Paul Belmondo (France) Didier André (France) Yann Clairay	Courage C65	MI	178
13	LMP2	37	(France) Paul Belmondo Racing	(France) Paul Belmondo (France) Didier André (France) Yann Clairay	Ford (AER) 2.0L Turbo I4	MI	178
14	GT1	61	(Russia) Convers Team (United Kingdom) Cirtek Motorsport	(Russia) Nikolai Fomenko (Russia) Alexey Vasilyev (France) Christophe Bouchut	Ferrari 550-GTS Maranello	MI	176
14	GT1	61	(Russia) Convers Team (United Kingdom) Cirtek Motorsport	(Russia) Nikolai Fomenko (Russia) Alexey Vasilyev (France) Christophe Bouchut	Ferrari 5.9L V12	MI	176
15	LMP2	25	(United Kingdom) RML	(United Kingdom) Mike Newton (Brazil) Thomas Erdos	MG-Lola EX264	MI	174
15	LMP2	25	(United Kingdom) RML	(United Kingdom) Mike Newton (Brazil) Thomas Erdos	MG (AER) XP20 2.0L Turbo I4	MI	174
16	LMP2	35	(Belgium) G-Force (Belgium) Renstal de Bokkenrijders	(Belgium) Frank Hahn (Netherlands) David Hart (France) Jean-François Leroch	Courage C65	D	170
16	LMP2	35	(Belgium) G-Force (Belgium) Renstal de Bokkenrijders	(Belgium) Frank Hahn (Netherlands) David Hart (France) Jean-François Leroch	Judd XV675 3.4L V8	D	170
17	**GT2**	**90**	**(United Kingdom) Sebah Automotive**	**(France) Xavier Pompidou (Germany) Marc Lieb**	**Porsche 911 GT3-R**	D	**170**
17	**GT2**	**90**	**(United Kingdom) Sebah Automotive**	**(France) Xavier Pompidou (Germany) Marc Lieb**	**Porsche 3.6L Flat-6**	D	**170**
18	GT2	85	(Netherlands) Spyker Squadron b.v.	(Netherlands) Jeroen Bleekemolen (Netherlands) Donny Crevels	Spyker C8 Spyder GT2-R	D	169
18	GT2	85	(Netherlands) Spyker Squadron b.v.	(Netherlands) Jeroen Bleekemolen (Netherlands) Donny Crevels	Audi 3.8L V8	D	169
19	LMP1	10	(Netherlands) Racing for Holland	(Netherlands) Jan Lammers (Italy) Beppe Gabbiani (Bolivia) Felipe Ortiz	Dome S101	D	169
19	LMP1	10	(Netherlands) Racing for Holland	(Netherlands) Jan Lammers (Italy) Beppe Gabbiani (Bolivia) Felipe Ortiz	Judd GV4 4.0L V10	D	169
20	GT2	76	(Italy) Autorlando Sport	(Italy) Franco Groppi (Italy) Luigi Moccia (Switzerland) Joël Camathias	Porsche 911 GT3-RSR	P	168
20	GT2	76	(Italy) Autorlando Sport	(Italy) Franco Groppi (Italy) Luigi Moccia (Switzerland) Joël Camathias	Porsche 3.6L Flat-6	P	168
21	LMP2	39	(United Kingdom) Chamberlain-Synergy Motorsport	(United Kingdom) Bob Berridge (United Kingdom) Gareth Evans (United Kingdom) Peter Owen	Lola B05/40	D	168
21	LMP2	39	(United Kingdom) Chamberlain-Synergy Motorsport	(United Kingdom) Bob Berridge (United Kingdom) Gareth Evans (United Kingdom) Peter Owen	AER P07 2.0L Turbo I4	D	168
22	LMP2	21	(France) Noël del Bello Racing	(France) Jean-Luc Maury-Laribière (France) Romain Iannetta (France) François Jakubowski	Courage C65	MI	168
22	LMP2	21	(France) Noël del Bello Racing	(France) Jean-Luc Maury-Laribière (France) Romain Iannetta (France) François Jakubowski	Mecachrome 3.4L V8	MI	168
23	GT2	93	(United Kingdom) Scuderia Ecosse	(United Kingdom) Nathan Kinch (United Kingdom) Andrew Kirkaldy	Ferrari 360 Modena GTC	P	168
23	GT2	93	(United Kingdom) Scuderia Ecosse	(United Kingdom) Nathan Kinch (United Kingdom) Andrew Kirkaldy	Ferrari 3.6L V8	P	168
24	GT2	73	(Belgium) Ice Pol Racing Team	(Belgium) Yves Lambert (Belgium) Christian Lefort (Finland) Markus Palttala	Porsche 911 GT3-RSR	D	166
24	GT2	73	(Belgium) Ice Pol Racing Team	(Belgium) Yves Lambert (Belgium) Christian Lefort (Finland) Markus Palttala	Porsche 3.6L Flat-6	D	166
25	LMP2	31	(France) Noël del Bello Racing	(France) Christophe Tinseau (Belgium) Loïc Deman (Portugal) Ni Amorim	Courage C65	MI	164
25	LMP2	31	(France) Noël del Bello Racing	(France) Christophe Tinseau (Belgium) Loïc Deman (Portugal) Ni Amorim	Mecachrome 3.4L V8	MI	164
26	GT2	95	(United Kingdom) Racesport Peninsula TVR	(United Kingdom) Richard Stanton (United Kingdom) Piers Johnson	TVR Tuscan T400R	D	164
26	GT2	95	(United Kingdom) Racesport Peninsula TVR	(United Kingdom) Richard Stanton (United Kingdom) Piers Johnson	TVR 4.0L I6	D	164
27	GT2	89	(United Kingdom) Sebah Automotive	(Denmark) Lars-Erik Nielsen (Denmark) Thorkild Thyrring (Germany) Pierre Ehret	Porsche 911 GT3-RSR	D	163
27	GT2	89	(United Kingdom) Sebah Automotive	(Denmark) Lars-Erik Nielsen (Denmark) Thorkild Thyrring (Germany) Pierre Ehret	Porsche 3.6L Flat-6	D	163
28	GT2	88	(Hong Kong) Noble Group (United Kingdom) Gruppe M Racing	(Hong Kong) Darryl O'Young (United Kingdom) Matthew Marsh	Porsche 911 GT3-RSR	P	155
28	GT2	88	(Hong Kong) Noble Group (United Kingdom) Gruppe M Racing	(Hong Kong) Darryl O'Young (United Kingdom) Matthew Marsh	Porsche 3.6L Flat-6	P	155
29	GT1	56	(France) Paul Belmondo Racing	(France) Pierre Perret (Switzerland) Karim Ajlani (Switzerland) Benjamin Leuenberger	Chrysler Viper GTS-R	MI	154
29	GT1	56	(France) Paul Belmondo Racing	(France) Pierre Perret (Switzerland) Karim Ajlani (Switzerland) Benjamin Leuenberger	Chrysler 8.0L V10	MI	154
30	GT1	57	(France) Paul Belmondo Racing	(France) Didier Sommereau (France) Jean-Michel Papolla (Belgium) Kurt Mollekens	Chrysler Viper GTS-R	MI	154
30	GT1	57	(France) Paul Belmondo Racing	(France) Didier Sommereau (France) Jean-Michel Papolla (Belgium) Kurt Mollekens	Chrysler 8.0L V10	MI	154
31	LMP1	18	(United Kingdom) Rollcentre Racing	(Switzerland) Harold Primat (France) Bruce Jouanny	Dallara SP1	MI	153
31	LMP1	18	(United Kingdom) Rollcentre Racing	(Switzerland) Harold Primat (France) Bruce Jouanny	Judd GV4 4.0L V10	MI	153
32	GT2	97	(United Kingdom) Tech9 Motorsport	(United Kingdom) Peter Cook (United Kingdom) Phil Keen (United Kingdom) Oliver Bryant	Porsche 911 GT3-RSR	D	144
32	GT2	97	(United Kingdom) Tech9 Motorsport	(United Kingdom) Peter Cook (United Kingdom) Phil Keen (United Kingdom) Oliver Bryant	Porsche 3.6L Flat-6	D	144
33 NC^{†}	LMP2	36	(France) Paul Belmondo Racing	(France) Claude-Yves Gosselin (Saudi Arabia) Karim Ojjeh (Belgium) Vincent Vosse	Courage C65	MI	166
33 NC^{†}	LMP2	36	(France) Paul Belmondo Racing	(France) Claude-Yves Gosselin (Saudi Arabia) Karim Ojjeh (Belgium) Vincent Vosse	Ford (AER) 2.0L Turbo I4	MI	166
34 NC	LMP2	41	(United States) Binnie Motorsports	(United States) William Binnie (United Kingdom) Allen Timpany (United Kingdom) Sam Hancock	Lola B05/40	P	116
34 NC	LMP2	41	(United States) Binnie Motorsports	(United States) William Binnie (United Kingdom) Allen Timpany (United Kingdom) Sam Hancock	Nicholson-McLaren 3.3L V8	P	116
35 NC	GT2	98	(United Kingdom) James Watt Automotive	(United Kingdom) Paul Daniels (Denmark) Allan Simonsen	Porsche 911 GT3-RS	D	111
35 NC	GT2	98	(United Kingdom) James Watt Automotive	(United Kingdom) Paul Daniels (Denmark) Allan Simonsen	Porsche 3.6L Flat-6	D	111
36 DNF	GT2	99	(Italy) G.P.C. Sport	(Italy) Gabrio Rosa (Italy) Luca Drudi (Italy) Fabio Babini	Ferrari 360 Modena GTC	P	134
36 DNF	GT2	99	(Italy) G.P.C. Sport	(Italy) Gabrio Rosa (Italy) Luca Drudi (Italy) Fabio Babini	Ferrari 3.6L V8	P	134
37 DNF	GT2	79	(Germany) JP Racing	(Germany) Jens Petersen (Germany) Jan-Dirk Lueders (Switzerland) Niki Leutwiler	Porsche 911 GT3-RS	P	117
37 DNF	GT2	79	(Germany) JP Racing	(Germany) Jens Petersen (Germany) Jan-Dirk Lueders (Switzerland) Niki Leutwiler	Porsche 3.6L Flat-6	P	117
38 DNF	GT2	81	(United Kingdom) Team LNT	(United Kingdom) Jonny Kane (United Kingdom) Warren Hughes	TVR Tuscan T400R	D	104
38 DNF	GT2	81	(United Kingdom) Team LNT	(United Kingdom) Jonny Kane (United Kingdom) Warren Hughes	TVR 4.0L I6	D	104
39 DNF	GT2	83	(Germany) Seikel Motorsport	(Austria) Horst Felbermayr Sr. (Austria) Horst Felbermayr Jr. (United States) Philip Collin	Porsche 911 GT3-RS	Y	94
39 DNF	GT2	83	(Germany) Seikel Motorsport	(Austria) Horst Felbermayr Sr. (Austria) Horst Felbermayr Jr. (United States) Philip Collin	Porsche 3.6L Flat-6	Y	94
40 DNF	GT1	68	(Monaco) JMB Racing	(France) Antoine Gosse (France) Stéphane Daoudi (Netherlands) Peter Kutemann	Ferrari 575-GTC Maranello	P	83
40 DNF	GT1	68	(Monaco) JMB Racing	(France) Antoine Gosse (France) Stéphane Daoudi (Netherlands) Peter Kutemann	Ferrari 6.0L V12	P	83
41 DNF	LMP2	20	(France) Pir Competition	(France) Pierre Bruneau (France) Marc Rostan (France) Jean-Philippe Peugeot	Pilbeam MP93	MI	80
41 DNF	LMP2	20	(France) Pir Competition	(France) Pierre Bruneau (France) Marc Rostan (France) Jean-Philippe Peugeot	JPX (Mader) 3.4L V6	MI	80
42 DNF	LMP2	30	(United Kingdom) Kruse Motorsport	(United Kingdom) Phillip Bennett (Denmark) Juan Barazi	Courage C65	P	47
42 DNF	LMP2	30	(United Kingdom) Kruse Motorsport	(United Kingdom) Phillip Bennett (Denmark) Juan Barazi	Judd XV675 3.4L V8	P	47
43 DNF	GT2	82	(United Kingdom) Team LNT	(United Kingdom) Marc Hynes (United Kingdom) Patrick Pearce (United Kingdom) Lawrence Tomlinson	TVR Tuscan T400R	D	32
43 DNF	GT2	82	(United Kingdom) Team LNT	(United Kingdom) Marc Hynes (United Kingdom) Patrick Pearce (United Kingdom) Lawrence Tomlinson	TVR 4.0L I6	D	32
44 DNF	GT1	53	(Germany) A-Level Engineering	(Germany) Marcel Tiemann (Germany) Wolfgang Kaufmann	Porsche 911 Bi-Turbo	MI	30
44 DNF	GT1	53	(Germany) A-Level Engineering	(Germany) Marcel Tiemann (Germany) Wolfgang Kaufmann	Porsche 3.6L Turbo Flat-6	MI	30

† - #36 Paul Belmondo Racing was listed as not classified due to failing to complete the final lap of the race.

== Statistics ==
- Pole Position - #15 Zytek Motorsport - 1:44.275
- Fastest Lap - #15 Zytek Motorsport - 1:46.042

Le Mans Series
Previous race: 2005 1000km of Silverstone	2005 season	Next race: 2005 1000km of Istanbul
