= 2005 Le Mans Endurance Series =

Motorsport series

Seasons
- ← 2004 2006 →

The 2005 Le Mans Endurance Series was the second season of ACO's Le Mans Endurance Series. It is a series for Le Mans prototype and Grand Touring style cars broken into 4 classes: LMP1, LMP2, GT1, and GT2. It began on 17 April 2005 and ended on 13 November 2005 after 5 rounds.

== Schedule ==
Rnd	Race	Circuit	Date
-	(France) LMES Official Test	Paul Ricard HTTT	1 April; 2 April
1	(Belgium) 1000 km of Spa	Circuit de Spa-Francorchamps	17 April
2	(Italy) 1000 km of Monza	Autodromo Nazionale di Monza	10 July
3	(United Kingdom) 1000 km of Silverstone	Silverstone Circuit	13 August
4	(Germany) 1000 km of Nürburgring	Nürburgring	4 September
5	(Turkey) 1000 km of Istanbul	Istanbul Racing Circuit	13 November

== Season results ==
Overall winner in bold.

Rnd	Circuit	LMP1 Winning Team	LMP2 Winning Team	GT1 Winning Team	GT2 Winning Team	Results
Rnd	Circuit	LMP1 Winning Drivers	LMP2 Winning Drivers	GT1 Winning Drivers	GT2 Winning Drivers	Results
1	Spa	**(United Kingdom) #15 Zytek Motorsport**	(United Kingdom) #39 Chamberlain-Synergy	(Italy) #52 BMS Scuderia Italia	(United Kingdom) #81 Team LNT	Results
1	Spa	**(Japan) Hayanari Shimoda** **(Denmark) Casper Elgaard** **(Denmark) John Nielsen**	(United Kingdom) Bob Berridge (United Kingdom) Peter Owen (United Kingdom) Gareth Evans	(Italy) Fabrizio Gollin (Italy) Matteo Cressoni (Portugal) Miguel Ramos	(United Kingdom) Jonny Kane (United Kingdom) Warren Hughes	Results
2	Monza	**(France) #17 Pescarolo Sport**	(France) #36 Paul Belmondo Racing	(Italy) #51 BMS Scuderia Italia	(United Kingdom) #90 Sebah Automotive	Results
2	Monza	**(France) Emmanuel Collard** **(France) Jean-Christophe Boullion**	(Saudi Arabia) Karim Ojjeh (France) Claude-Yves Gosselin (Belgium) Vincent Vosse	(Italy) Christian Pescatori (Italy) Michele Bartyan (Switzerland) Toni Seiler	(Germany) Marc Lieb (France) Xavier Pompidou	Results
3	Silverstone	**(France) #4 Audi PlayStation Team Oreca**	(France) #36 Paul Belmondo Racing	(Czech Republic) #67 MenX	(United Kingdom) #90 Sebah Automotive	Results
3	Silverstone	**(Monaco) Stéphane Ortelli** **(United Kingdom) Allan McNish**	(Saudi Arabia) Karim Ojjeh (France) Claude-Yves Gosselin (Belgium) Vincent Vosse	(Czech Republic) Robert Pergl (Czech Republic) Jaroslav Janiš (Netherlands) Peter Kox	(Germany) Marc Lieb (France) Xavier Pompidou	Results
4	Nürburgring	**(United Kingdom) #15 Zytek Motorsport**	(Switzerland) #27 Horag-Lista Racing	(Russia) #62 Convers Team	(United Kingdom) #90 Sebah Automotive	Results
4	Nürburgring	**(Japan) Hayanari Shimoda** **(United Kingdom) Tom Chilton**	(Belgium) Didier Theys (Belgium) Eric van de Poele	(United Kingdom) Darren Turner (United Kingdom) Rob Bell	(Germany) Marc Lieb (France) Xavier Pompidou	Results
5	Istanbul	**(France) #17 Pescarolo Sport**	(United Kingdom) #25 RML	(Italy) #51 BMS Scuderia Italia	(United Kingdom) #93 Scuderia Ecosse	Results
5	Istanbul	**(France) Jean-Christophe Boullion** **(France) Emmanuel Collard**	(United Kingdom) Mike Newton (Brazil) Thomas Erdos	(Italy) Christian Pescatori (Italy) Michele Bartyan (Switzerland) Toni Seiler	(United Kingdom) Andrew Kirkaldy (United Kingdom) Nathan Kinch	Results

== Drivers' Championships ==
Points are awarded to the top 8 finishers in the order of 10-8-6-5-4-3-2-1. Drivers who do not drive for at least one hour do not receive points.

Points are awarded to a single driver and car combination. If a driver wins points driving a different car in a different event, those points are listed separately. Drivers listed multiple times in the points standings are marked with an asterisk.

=== LMP1 Standings ===
Pos	Driver	Team	SPA (Belgium)	MNZ (Italy)	SIL (United Kingdom)	NÜR (Germany)	IST (Turkey)	Total
1	(France) Emmanuel Collard (France) Jean-Christophe Boullion	(France) Pescarolo Sport	2	1	8	4	1	34
2	(Japan) Hayanari Shimoda	(United Kingdom) Zytek Motorsport	1	6	5	1	4	32
3	(Monaco) Stéphane Ortelli	(France) Audi PlayStation Team Oreca	Ret		1	2	2	26
3	(United Kingdom) Allan McNish	(France) Audi PlayStation Team Oreca			1	2	2	26
4	(Belgium) Vanina Ickx (United Kingdom) Martin Short	(United Kingdom) Rollcentre Racing	3	3	3	5	8	25
5	(France) Nicolas Minassian (United Kingdom) Jamie Campbell-Walter	(United Kingdom) Creation Autosportif	Ret	7	2	3	3	24
6	(United Kingdom) Tom Chilton	(United Kingdom) Zytek Motorsport		6	5	1	4	22
7	(Portugal) João Barbosa	(United Kingdom) Rollcentre Racing	Ret	3	3	5	8	19
8	(United Kingdom) Sam Hignett (United Kingdom) John Stack	(United Kingdom) Team Jota	Ret	2	6	6		16
9	(Denmark) Casper Elgaard	(United Kingdom) Zytek Motorsport	1				4	15
10	(Japan) Haruki Kurosawa	(United Kingdom) Team Jota	Ret	2	6			13
11	(Switzerland) Alexander Frei	(France) Courage Compétition	Ret	4	6	7	8	11
12	(Denmark) John Nielsen	(United Kingdom) Zytek Motorsport	1					10
13	(United Kingdom) Christian Vann	(France) Courage Compétition	Ret	4	6	7		10
14	(France) Érik Comas	(France) Pescarolo Sport	2					8
15	(United Kingdom) Gregor Fisken	(United Kingdom) Team Jota				6	5	7
16	(United Kingdom) Rob Barff	(United Kingdom) Rollcentre Racing	3					6
17	(Switzerland) Jean-Denis Délétraz	(United Kingdom) Creation Autosportif					3	6
18	(France) Jean-Marc Gounon	(France) Audi PlayStation Team Oreca	Ret					6
18	(France) Jean-Marc Gounon	(France) Courage Compétition		4			8	6
19	(Japan) Ryo Michigami (Japan) Shigekazu Wakisaka (Japan) Seiji Ara	(Japan) Jim Gainer International	4					5
20	(France) Jonathan Cochet	(France) Courage Compétition	Ret		6	7		4
21	(United Kingdom) Sam Hancock (Turkey) Jason Tahincioglu	(United Kingdom) Team Jota					5	4
22	(Netherlands) Jan Lammers (Italy) Beppe Gabbiani (Bolivia) Felipe Ortiz	(Netherlands) Racing for Holland		7	Ret	8		3
23	(United Kingdom) Justin Keen (Denmark) Jens Reno Møller	(United Kingdom) Lister Racing	Ret		7			2
24	(France) Bruce Jouanny (Switzerland) Harold Primat	(United Kingdom) Rollcentre Racing			Ret	9	7	2
25	(Denmark) Jan Magnussen	(United Kingdom) Lister Racing	Ret					0
26	(Germany) Michael Krumm (United Kingdom) Andrew Thompson	(United Kingdom) Rollcentre Racing	Ret					0
27	(Italy) Alex Caffi (Italy) Leonardo Maddalena (Italy) Michele Serafini	(Italy) GP Racing		Ret				0
28	(Spain) Balba Camino (United Kingdom) Amanda Stretton	(United Kingdom) Chamberlain-Synergy Motorsport			Ret			0

Key
Colour	Result
Gold	Race winner
Silver	2nd place
Bronze	3rd place
Green	Points finish
Blue	Non-points finish
Blue	Non-classified finish (NC)
Purple	Did not finish (Ret)
Black	Disqualified (DSQ)
Black	Excluded (EX)
White	Did not start (DNS)
White	Race cancelled (C)
White	Withdrew (WD)
Blank	Did not participate

**Bold** – Pole
Italics – Fastest Lap

=== LMP2 Standings ===
Pos	Driver	Team	SPA (Belgium)	MNZ (Italy)	SIL (United Kingdom)	NÜR (Germany)	IST (Turkey)	Total
1	(United Kingdom) Gareth Evans	(United Kingdom) Chamberlain-Synergy Motorsport	1	2	5	5	2	34
2	(Brazil) Thomas Erdos (United Kingdom) Mike Newton	(United Kingdom) RML	4	3	3	3	1	33
3	(France) Claude-Yves Gosselin (Belgium) Vincent Vosse	(France) Paul Belmondo Racing	6	1	1	Ret	5	27
4	(United Kingdom) Peter Owen	(United Kingdom) Chamberlain-Synergy Motorsport	1	2	5	5		26
4	(United Kingdom) Bob Berridge	(United Kingdom) Chamberlain-Synergy Motorsport	1	2		5	2	26
5	(Belgium) Didier Theys	(Switzerland) Horag-Lista Racing		Ret	4	1	3	21
6	(Saudi Arabia) Karim Ojjeh	(France) Paul Belmondo Racing	6	1	1	Ret	5	17
7	(Denmark) Juan Barazi	(Germany) Kruse Motorsport		Ret	2	Ret		13
7	(Denmark) Juan Barazi	(France) Barazi-Epsilon					4	13
7	(Netherlands) Michael Vergers	(Germany) Kruse Motorsport		Ret	2			13
7	(Netherlands) Michael Vergers	(France) Barazi-Epsilon					4	13
8	(Belgium) Eric van de Poele	(Switzerland) Horag-Lista Racing				1		10
9	(Portugal) Ni Amorim (France) Christophe Tinseau	(France) Noël del Bello Racing	2	Ret	Ret	7		10
10	(France) Didier André (France) Paul Belmondo	(France) Paul Belmondo Racing	Ret	Ret	7	2	Ret	10
11	(France) Marc Rostan	(France) Pir Competition	3	Ret	6	Ret	Ret	9
11	(France) Pierre Bruneau (France) Jean-Philippe Peugeot	(France) Pir Competition	3	Ret	6	Ret		9
12	(Italy) Mauro Prospero	(Italy) Scuderia Villorba Corse	5	4				9
13	(France) Yann Clairay	(France) Paul Belmondo Racing				2		8
14	(Switzerland) Christophe Pillon	(France) Noël del Bello Racing	2					8
15	(United Kingdom) Philipp Bennett	(Germany) Kruse Motorsport	Ret	Ret	2	Ret		8
16	(United Kingdom) Guy Smith	(United Kingdom) Chamberlain-Synergy Motorsport					2	8
17	(France) Jean-François Leroch	(Belgium) G-Force Racing	Ret		8	4	Ret	6
18	(Sweden) Thed Björk	(Switzerland) Horag-Lista Racing					3	6
19	(Germany) Frank Hahn	(Belgium) G-Force Racing			8	4	Ret	6
20	(Italy) Denny Zardo	(Italy) Scuderia Villorba Corse		4				5
21	(Netherlands) David Hart	(Belgium) G-Force Racing				4		5
22	(Switzerland) Fredy Lienhard	(Switzerland) Horag-Lista Racing		Ret	4			5
23	(Belgium) Sébastien Ugeux	(Italy) Scuderia Villorba Corse	5					4
24	(France) Jean-Luc Maury-Laribiére	(France) Noël del Bello Racing	Ret			6		3
25	(Italy) Ranieri Randaccio	(Italy) Ranieri Randaccio SRL	NC	Ret	DNS		6	3
25	(Italy) Fabio Mancini	(Italy) Ranieri Randaccio SRL	NC	Ret			6	3
26	(France) Romain Iannetta	(France) Paul Belmondo Racing	Ret					3
26	(France) Romain Iannetta	(France) Noël del Bello Racing				6		3
26	(France) François Jakubowski	(France) Noël del Bello Racing				6		3
27	(Belgium) Loïc Deman	(Belgium) G-Force Racing	Ret					2
27	(Belgium) Loïc Deman	(France) Noël del Bello Racing				7		2
28	(United Kingdom) Adam Sharpe	(United States) Binnie Motorsports		Ret				2
28	(United Kingdom) Adam Sharpe	(France) Paul Belmondo Racing			7			2
29	(United Kingdom) Tim Greaves	(Belgium) G-Force Racing			8		Ret	1
30	(France) Baston Brière	(France) Noël del Bello Racing	Ret	Ret	Ret			0
31	(Italy) Piergiuseppe Peroni (Italy) Mirko Savoldi	(Italy) Lucchini Engineering	Ret	Ret				0
32	(France) Jean-Philippe Belloc	(France) Noël del Bello Racing	Ret					0
33	(United Kingdom) Gregor Fisken (Switzerland) Harold Primat	(Germany) Kruse Motorsport	Ret					0
34	(Netherlands) Val Hillebrand	(Belgium) G-Force Racing	Ret					0
35	(United States) William Binnie	(United States) Binnie Motorsports		Ret	Ret	Ret		0
36	(Canada) Robert Julien	(United States) Binnie Motorsports		Ret				0
37	(United Kingdom) Sam Hancock (United Kingdom) Allen Timpany	(United States) Binnie Motorsports			Ret	Ret		0
38	(United Kingdom) Del Delaronde (United Kingdom) Richard Jones (United Kingdom) Edward Morris	(United Kingdom) Tracsport			Ret			0
39	(Italy) Matteo Maria Tullio	(Italy) Ranieri Randaccio SRL			DNS			0
40	(France) Philippe Haezebrouck (United Kingdom) Simon Pullan	(France) Pir Competition					Ret	0
41	(France) Grégory Fargier (Switzerland) Philippe Favre (Switzerland) Christophe Ricard	(Switzerland) Equipe Palmyr					Ret	0
42	(Turkey) Ahmet Cemil Cipa	(France) Paul Belmondo Racing					Ret	0

=== GT1 Standings ===
Pos	Driver	Team	SPA (Belgium)	MNZ (Italy)	SIL (United Kingdom)	NÜR (Germany)	IST (Turkey)	Total
1	(Italy) Christian Pescatori (Italy) Michele Bartyan (Switzerland) Toni Seiler	(Italy) BMS Scuderia Italia	3	1	6	3	1	35
2	(Italy) Matteo Cressoni	(Italy) BMS Scuderia Italia	1	4	5	2	2	35
3	(France) Christophe Bouchut (Russia) Aleksey Vasilyev	(Russia) Convers Team (United Kingdom) Cirtek Motorsport	2	3	2	5	4	31
4	(Portugal) Miguel Ramos	(Italy) BMS Scuderia Italia	1		5	2	2	30
5	(Czech Republic) Robert Pergl	(Czech Republic) MenX	Ret	2	1	4	3	29
6	(Czech Republic) Jaroslav Janiš	(Czech Republic) MenX		2	1	4		23
7	(Netherlands) Peter Kox	(Czech Republic) MenX			1	4	3	21
8	(United Kingdom) Darren Turner	(Russia) Convers Team			4	1	4	20
9	(Russia) Nikolai Fomenko	(Russia) Convers Team	2	3	4	5		17
10	(Italy) Fabrizio Gollin	(Italy) BMS Scuderia Italia	1	4				15
11	(United Kingdom) Rob Bell (France) Frédéric Dor	(Russia) Convers Team				1		10
12	(Germany) Wolfgang Kaufmann	(Germany) A-Level Engineering	Ret	6	3	Ret		9
12	(Germany) Marcel Tiemann	(Germany) A-Level Engineering		6	3	Ret		9
13	(Czech Republic) Tomáš Enge	(Czech Republic) MenX	Ret	2				8
14	(France) Antoine Gosse (Netherlands) Peter Kutemann	(Monaco) JMB Racing	Ret	5	Ret	Ret	5	8
15	(United Kingdom) Jamie Davies	(Italy) BMS Scuderia Italia				2		8
16	(Italy) Fabio Babini	(Italy) BMS Scuderia Italia					2	8
17	(France) Jean-Michel Papolla (France) Didier Sommereau	(France) Paul Belmondo Racing		Ret	7	7	6	7
18	(Portugal) Pedro Lamy	(Czech Republic) MenX					3	6
19	(Portugal) António Coimbra	(Italy) BMS Scuderia Italia		4				5
20	(Belgium) Marc Goossens	(Russia) Convers Team			4			5
21	(Netherlands) Hans Hugenholtz	(Monaco) JMB Racing	Ret	5	Ret			4
22	(Italy) Matteo Malucelli	(Italy) BMS Scuderia Italia			5			4
23	(France) Stéphane Daoudi	(Monaco) JMB Racing				Ret	5	4
24	(Switzerland) Benjamin Leuenberger (France) Pierre Perret	(France) Paul Belmondo Racing	NC	Ret		6		3
25	(France) Stéphane Lacroix-Wasover	(France) Paul Belmondo Racing					6	3
26	(France) Yann Clairay	(France) Paul Belmondo Racing			7			2
27	(Belgium) Kurt Mollekens	(France) Paul Belmondo Racing				7		2
28	(United Kingdom) Ricky Cole	(United Kingdom) Graham Nash Motorsport	NC		8			1
29	(United Kingdom) Ryan Hooker (Scotland) Calum Lockie	(United Kingdom) Graham Nash Motorsport			8			1
30	(Italy) Gian Maria Gabbiani (United States) Rick Sutherland	(United Kingdom) Graham Nash Motorsport	NC					0
31	(France) Jean-Baptiste Émeric	(France) Paul Belmondo Racing	NC					0
32	(Italy) Matteo Bobbi (Italy) Paolo Ruberti (Belgium) Stéphane Lémeret	(United Kingdom) Graham Nash Motorsport	Ret					0
33	(Germany) Norman Simon	(Japan) JLOC (Germany) Reiter Engineering		Ret				0
34	(France) Romain Iannetta	(France) Paul Belmondo Racing		Ret				0
35	(Italy) Marco Apicella (Japan) Hisashi Wada (Japan) Koji Yamanishi	(Japan) JLOC		Ret				0

== Teams' Championships ==
Points are awarded to the top 8 finishers in the order of 10-8-6-5-4-3-2-1. Teams with multiple entries do not have their cars combined, each entry number is scored separately in the championship. Cars failing to complete 70% of the winner's distance are not awarded points.

=== LMP1 Standings ===
Pos	No	Team	Chassis	Engine	SPA (Belgium)	MNZ (Italy)	SIL (United Kingdom)	NÜR (Germany)	IST (Turkey)	Total
1	#17	(France) Pescarolo Sport	Pescarolo C60 Hybrid	Judd GV5 5.0 L V10	2	1	8	4	1	34
2	#15	(United Kingdom) Zytek Motorsport	Zytek 04S	Zytek ZG348 3.4 L V8	1	6	5	1	4	32
3	#4	(France) Audi PlayStation Team Oreca	Audi R8	Audi 3.6 L Turbo V8	Ret		1	2	2	26
4	#8	(United Kingdom) Rollcentre Racing	Dallara SP1	Judd GV4 4.0 L V10	3	3	3	5	6	25
5	#7	(United Kingdom) Creation Autosportif	DBA 03S	Judd GV5 5.0 L V10	Ret	5	2	3	3	24
6	#9	(United Kingdom) Team Jota	Zytek 04S	Zytek ZG348 3.4 L V8	Ret	2	4	6	5	20
7	#13	(France) Courage Compétition	Courage C60 Hybrid	Judd GV4 4.0 L V10	Ret	4	6	7	8	11
8	#5	(Japan) Jim Gainer International	Dome S101Hb	Mugen MF408S 4.0 L V8	4					5
9	#10	(Netherlands) Racing for Holland	Dome S101	Judd GV4 4.0 L V10		7	Ret	8		3
10	#6	(United Kingdom) Lister Racing	Lister Storm LMP	Chevrolet LS1 6.0 L V8	Ret		7			2
11	#18	(United Kingdom) Rollcentre Racing	Dallara SP1	Nissan VQ30DETT 3.0 L Turbo V6; Judd GV4 4.0 L V10	Ret		Ret	9	8	1

=== LMP2 Standings ===
Pos	No	Team	Chassis	Engine	SPA (Belgium)	MNZ (Italy)	SIL (United Kingdom)	NÜR (Germany)	IST (Turkey)	Total
1	#39	(United Kingdom) Chamberlain-Synergy Motorsport	Lola B05/40	AER P07 2.0 L Turbo I4	1	2	5	5	2	34
2	#25	(United Kingdom) RML	MG-Lola EX264	Judd XV675 3.4 L V8; MG (AER) XP20 2.0 L Turbo I4	4	3	3	3	1	33
3	#36	(France) Paul Belmondo Racing	Courage C65	Ford (AER) XP20 2.0 L Turbo I4	6	1	1	NC†	5	27
4	#27	(Switzerland) Horag-Lista Racing	Lola B05/40	Judd XV675 3.4 L V8		Ret	4	1	3	21
5=	#31	(France) Noël del Bello Racing	Courage C65	Mecachrome 3.4 L V8	2	Ret	Ret	7		10
5=	#37	(France) Paul Belmondo Racing	Courage C65	Ford (AER) XP20 2.0 L Turbo I4	Ret	Ret	7	2	Ret	10
7=	#20	(France) Pir Competition	Pilbeam MP91; Pilbeam MP93	JPX-Mader 3.4 L V6	3	Ret	6	Ret	Ret	9
7=	#46	(Italy) Scuderia Villorba Corse	Lucchini SR2001	Alfa Romeo 3.0 L V6	5	4				9
9	#30	(Germany) Kruse Motorsport	Courage C65	Judd XV675 3.4 L V8	Ret	Ret	2	Ret		8
10	#35	(Belgium) G-Force Racing	Courage C65	Judd XV675 3.4 L V8	Ret		8	4	Ret	6
11	#32	(France) Barazi-Epsilon	Courage C65	AER P07 2.0 L Turbo I4					4	5
12=	#21	(France) Noël del Bello Racing	Courage C65	Mecachrome 3.4 L V8	Ret			6		3
12=	#28	(Italy) Ranieri Randaccio SRL	Tampolli SR2	Nicholson McLaren XB 3.3 L V8	NC	Ret	DNS		6	3
NC	#45	(Italy) Lucchini Engineering	Lucchini LMP2/04	Judd XV675 3.4 L V8	Ret	Ret				0
NC	#41	(United States) Binnie Motorsports	Lola B05/40	Nicholson McLaren XB 3.3 L V8		Ret	Ret	NC		0
NC	#22	(United Kingdom) Tracsport	Tampolli SR2	Nissan (AER) VQL 3.0 L V6			Ret			0
NC	#26	(Switzerland) Equipe Palmyr	Lucchini SR2000	Alfa Romeo 3.0 L V6					Ret	0

=== GT1 Standings ===
Pos	No	Team	Chassis	Engine	SPA (Belgium)	MNZ (Italy)	SIL (United Kingdom)	NÜR (Germany)	IST (Turkey)	Total
1=^{†}	#51	(Italy) BMS Scuderia Italia	Ferrari 550-GTS Maranello	Ferrari F133 A 6.0 L V12	3	1	6	3	1	35
1=	#52	(Italy) BMS Scuderia Italia	Ferrari 550-GTS Maranello	Ferrari F133 A 6.0 L V12	1	4	5	2	2	35
3	#61	(Russia) Convers Team (United Kingdom) Cirtek Motorsport	Ferrari 550-GTS Maranello	Ferrari F133 A 6.0 L V12	2	3	2	5	4	31
4	#67	(Czech Republic) MenX	Ferrari 550-GTS Maranello	Ferrari F133 A 6.0 L V12	Ret	2	1	4	3	29
5	#62	(Russia) Convers Team (United Kingdom) Cirtek Motorsport	Aston Martin DBR9	Aston Martin AM04 6.0 L V12			4	1		15
6	#53	(Germany) A-Level Engineering	Porsche 911 Bi-Turbo	Porsche 3.6 L Turbo Flat-6	Ret	6	3	Ret		9
7	#68	(Monaco) JMB Racing	Ferrari 575-GTC Maranello	Ferrari F133 GT 6.0 L V12	Ret	5	Ret	Ret	5	8
8	#57	(France) Paul Belmondo Racing	Chrysler Viper GTS-R	Chrysler EWB 8.0 L V10		Ret	7	7	6	7
9	#56	(France) Paul Belmondo Racing	Chrysler Viper GTS-R	Chrysler EWB 8.0 L V10	NC	Ret	Ret	6		3
10	#65	(United Kingdom) Graham Nash Motorsport	Saleen S7-R	Ford Windsor 7.0 L V8	NC		8			1
NC	#66	(United Kingdom) Graham Nash Motorsport	Saleen S7-R	Ford Windsor 7.0 L V8	Ret					0
NC	#64	(Japan) JLOC (Germany) Reiter Engineering	Lamborghini Murciélago R-GT	Lamborghini L535 6.0 L V12		Ret				0
NC	#63	(Japan) JLOC	Lamborghini Murciélago R-GT	Lamborghini L535 6.0 L V12		Ret				0

† - #51 BMS Scuderia Italia won tie-breaker due to having more race wins.

=== GT2 Standings ===
Pos	No	Team	Chassis	Engine	SPA (Belgium)	MNZ (Italy)	SIL (United Kingdom)	NÜR (Germany)	IST (Turkey)	Total
1	#90	(United Kingdom) Sebah Automotive Ltd.	Porsche 911 GT3-R	Porsche M96/77 3.6 L Flat-6		1	1	1		30
2	#93	(United Kingdom) Scuderia Ecosse	Ferrari 360 Modena GTC	Ferrari F131 3.6 L V8	NC	2	4	4	1	28
3=	#76	(Italy) Autorlando Sport	Porsche 911 GT3-RSR	Porsche M96/79 3.6 L Flat-6	3	Ret	2	3	Ret	20
3=	#73	(Belgium) Ice Pol Racing Team	Porsche 911 GT3-RSR	Porsche M96/79 3.6 L Flat-6	6	4	5	5	5	20
5	#83	(Germany) Seikel Motorsport	Porsche 911 GT3-RSR	Porsche M96/79 3.6 L Flat-6	4	3	8	Ret	3	18
6=	#99	(Italy) GPC Sport	Ferrari 360 Modena GTC	Ferrari F131 3.6 L V8	5	Ret	6	Ret	2	15
6=	#89	(United Kingdom) Sebah Automotive Ltd.	Porsche 911 GT3-RSR	Porsche M96/79 3.6 L Flat-6	Ret	7	3	7	4	15
8	#81	(United Kingdom) Team LNT	TVR Tuscan T400R	TVR Speed Six 4.0 L I6	1	Ret	Ret	Ret	Ret	10
9=	#82	(United Kingdom) Team LNT	TVR Tuscan T400R	TVR Speed Six 4.0 L I6	2	DNS	11	Ret	DNS	8
9=	#85	(Netherlands) Spyker Squadron b.v	Spyker C8 Spyder GT2-R	Audi 3.8 L V8	Ret			2	Ret	8
11	#95	(United Kingdom) Racesport Peninsula TVR	TVR Tuscan T400R	TVR Speed Six 4.0 L I6	7		7	6	NC†	7
12	#79	(Germany) JP Racing	Porsche 911 GT3-RS	Porsche M97/77 3.6 L Flat-6	8	5	9	Ret		5
13	#98	(United Kingdom) James Watt Automotive	Porsche 911 GT3-RS	Porsche M97/77 3.6 L Flat-6	Ret	6	10	NC		3
14	#88	(Hong Kong) Noble Group (United Kingdom) Gruppe M Racing	Porsche 911 GT3-R; Porsche 911 GT3-RSR	Porsche M96/77 3.6 L Flat-6; Porsche M96/79 3.6 L Flat-6	Ret	Ret	Ret	8		1
NC	#91	(Japan) T2M Motorsport	Porsche 911 GT3-RS	Porsche M97/77 3.6 L Flat-6	NC					0
NC	#96	(United Kingdom) IN2 Racing	Porsche 911 GT3-RSR	Porsche M96/79 3.6 L Flat-6	Ret					0
NC	#97	(United Kingdom) Tech9 Motorsport	Porsche 911 GT3-RS	Porsche M97/77 3.6 L Flat-6		Ret	Ret	9		0
NC	#86	(Hong Kong) Noble Group (United Kingdom) Gruppe M Racing	Porsche 911 GT3-RSR	Porsche M96/79 3.6 L Flat-6			Ret			0
