= 2005 1000 km of Spa =

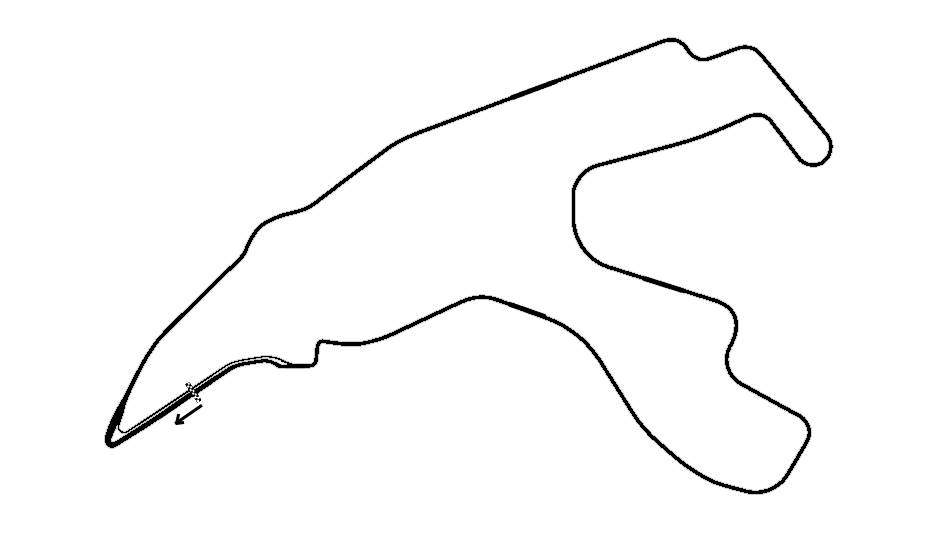
Layout of the Circuit de Spa-Francorchamps (2004–2006)

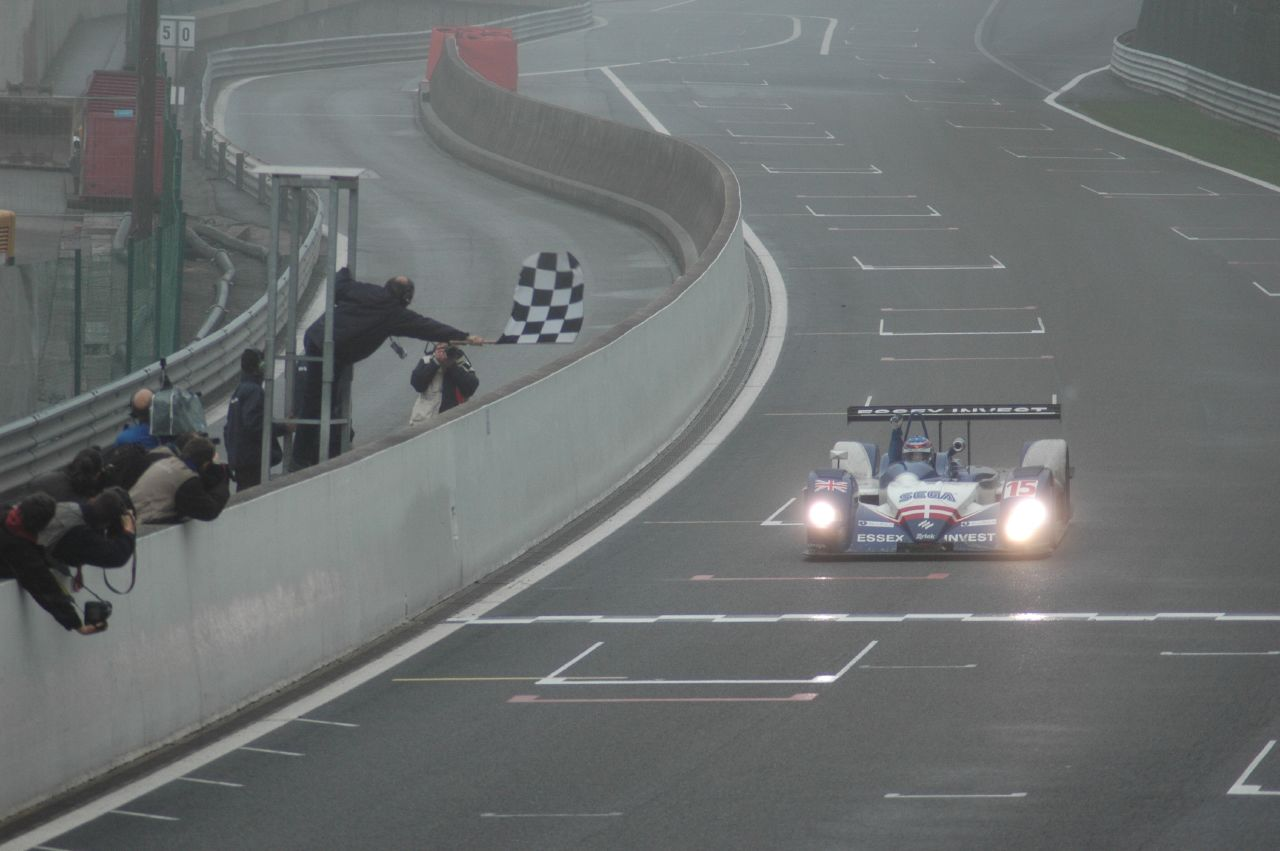
The #15 Zytek of Nielsen/Elgaard/Shimoda won the race overall.

The 2005 1000 km of Spa was the opening race of the 2005 Le Mans Series season and held at Circuit de Spa-Francorchamps, Belgium. It was run on April 17, 2005

== Official results ==
Class winners in bold. Cars failing to complete 70% of winner's distance marked as Not Classified (NC).

Pos	Class	No	Team	Drivers	Chassis	Tyre	Laps
Pos	Class	No	Team	Drivers	Engine	Tyre	Laps
1	**LMP1**	**15**	**(United Kingdom) Zytek Engineering**	**(Denmark) John Nielsen (Denmark) Casper Elgaard (Japan) Hayanari Shimoda**	**Zytek 04S**	MI	**132**
1	**LMP1**	**15**	**(United Kingdom) Zytek Engineering**	**(Denmark) John Nielsen (Denmark) Casper Elgaard (Japan) Hayanari Shimoda**	**Zytek ZG348 3.4L V8**	MI	**132**
2	LMP1	17	(France) Pescarolo Sport	(France) Emmanuel Collard (France) Jean-Christophe Boullion (France) Érik Comas	Pescarolo C60 Hybrid	MI	131
2	LMP1	17	(France) Pescarolo Sport	(France) Emmanuel Collard (France) Jean-Christophe Boullion (France) Érik Comas	Judd GV5 5.0L V10	MI	131
3	LMP1	8	(United Kingdom) Rollcentre Racing	(United Kingdom) Martin Short (United Kingdom) Rob Barff (Belgium) Vanina Ickx	Dallara SP1	MI	127
3	LMP1	8	(United Kingdom) Rollcentre Racing	(United Kingdom) Martin Short (United Kingdom) Rob Barff (Belgium) Vanina Ickx	Judd GV4 4.0L V10	MI	127
4	LMP1	5	(Japan) Jim Gainer International	(Japan) Ryo Michigami (Japan) Shigekazu Wakisaka (Japan) Seiji Ara	Dome S101Hb	D	126
4	LMP1	5	(Japan) Jim Gainer International	(Japan) Ryo Michigami (Japan) Shigekazu Wakisaka (Japan) Seiji Ara	Mugen MF408S 4.0L V8	D	126
5	**LMP2**	**39**	**(United Kingdom) Chamberlain-Synergy Motorsport**	**(United Kingdom) Bob Berridge (United Kingdom) Gareth Evans (United Kingdom) Peter Owen**	**Lola B05/40**	D	**124**
5	**LMP2**	**39**	**(United Kingdom) Chamberlain-Synergy Motorsport**	**(United Kingdom) Bob Berridge (United Kingdom) Gareth Evans (United Kingdom) Peter Owen**	**AER P07 2.0L Turbo I4**	D	**124**
6	**GT1**	**52**	**(Italy) BMS Scuderia Italia**	**(Italy) Fabrizio Gollin (Italy) Matteo Cressoni (Portugal) Miguel Ramos**	**Ferrari 550-GTS Maranello**	P	**123**
6	**GT1**	**52**	**(Italy) BMS Scuderia Italia**	**(Italy) Fabrizio Gollin (Italy) Matteo Cressoni (Portugal) Miguel Ramos**	**Ferrari 5.9L V12**	P	**123**
7	LMP2	31	(France) Noël del Bello Racing	(France) Christophe Tinseau (Portugal) Ni Amorim (Switzerland) Christophe Pillon	Courage C65	MI	121
7	LMP2	31	(France) Noël del Bello Racing	(France) Christophe Tinseau (Portugal) Ni Amorim (Switzerland) Christophe Pillon	Mecachrome 3.4L V8	MI	121
8	**GT2**	**81**	**(United Kingdom) Team LNT**	**(United Kingdom) Warren Hughes (United Kingdom) Lawrence Tomlinson (United Kingdom) Jonny Kane**	**TVR Tuscan T400R**	D	**120**
8	**GT2**	**81**	**(United Kingdom) Team LNT**	**(United Kingdom) Warren Hughes (United Kingdom) Lawrence Tomlinson (United Kingdom) Jonny Kane**	**TVR Speed Six 4.0L I6**	D	**120**
9	GT1	61	(Russia) Convers Team (United Kingdom) Cirtek Motorsport	(Russia) Alexey Vasilyev (Russia) Nikolai Fomenko (France) Christophe Bouchut	Ferrari 550-GTS Maranello	MI	120
9	GT1	61	(Russia) Convers Team (United Kingdom) Cirtek Motorsport	(Russia) Alexey Vasilyev (Russia) Nikolai Fomenko (France) Christophe Bouchut	Ferrari 5.9L V12	MI	120
10	GT2	82	(United Kingdom) Team LNT	(United Kingdom) Marc Hynes (United Kingdom) Patrick Pearce (United Kingdom) Jason Templeman	TVR Tuscan T400R	D	119
10	GT2	82	(United Kingdom) Team LNT	(United Kingdom) Marc Hynes (United Kingdom) Patrick Pearce (United Kingdom) Jason Templeman	TVR Speed Six 4.0L I6	D	119
11	GT2	76	(Italy) Autorlando Sport	(Italy) Luigi Moccia (Italy) Franco Groppi (Switzerland) Joël Camathias	Porsche 911 GT3-RSR	P	119
11	GT2	76	(Italy) Autorlando Sport	(Italy) Luigi Moccia (Italy) Franco Groppi (Switzerland) Joël Camathias	Porsche 3.6L Flat-6	P	119
12	GT2	83	(Germany) Seikel Motorsport	(Austria) Horst Felbermayr Sr. (Austria) Horst Felbermayr Jr. (United States) Philip Collin	Porsche 911 GT3-RSR	Y	117
12	GT2	83	(Germany) Seikel Motorsport	(Austria) Horst Felbermayr Sr. (Austria) Horst Felbermayr Jr. (United States) Philip Collin	Porsche 3.6L Flat-6	Y	117
13	GT2	99	(Italy) G.P.C. Sport	(Italy) Fabio Babini (Italy) Gabrio Rosa (Italy) Luca Drudi	Ferrari 360 Modena GTC	P	117
13	GT2	99	(Italy) G.P.C. Sport	(Italy) Fabio Babini (Italy) Gabrio Rosa (Italy) Luca Drudi	Ferrari 3.6L V8	P	117
14	GT1	51	(Italy) BMS Scuderia Italia	(Italy) Christian Pescatori (Italy) Michele Bartyan (Switzerland) Toni Seiler	Ferrari 550-GTS Maranello	P	117
14	GT1	51	(Italy) BMS Scuderia Italia	(Italy) Christian Pescatori (Italy) Michele Bartyan (Switzerland) Toni Seiler	Ferrari 5.9L V12	P	117
15	GT2	73	(Belgium) Ice Pol Racing Team	(Belgium) Yves Lambert (Belgium) Christian Lefort (Finland) Markus Palttala	Porsche 911 GT3-RSR	D	116
15	GT2	73	(Belgium) Ice Pol Racing Team	(Belgium) Yves Lambert (Belgium) Christian Lefort (Finland) Markus Palttala	Porsche 3.6L Flat-6	D	116
16	LMP2	20	(France) Pir Competition	(France) Pierre Bruneau (France) Marc Rostan (France) Jean-Philippe Peugeot	Pilbeam MP91	MI	115
16	LMP2	20	(France) Pir Competition	(France) Pierre Bruneau (France) Marc Rostan (France) Jean-Philippe Peugeot	JPX-Mader 3.4L V8	MI	115
17	GT2	95	(United Kingdom) Racesport Peninsula TVR	(United Kingdom) John Hartshorne (United Kingdom) Daniel Eagling (United Kingdom) Richard Stanton	TVR Tuscan T400R	D	113
17	GT2	95	(United Kingdom) Racesport Peninsula TVR	(United Kingdom) John Hartshorne (United Kingdom) Daniel Eagling (United Kingdom) Richard Stanton	TVR Speed Six 4.0L I6	D	113
18	LMP2	25	(United Kingdom) RML	(United Kingdom) Mike Newton (Brazil) Thomas Erdos	MG-Lola EX264	MI	113
18	LMP2	25	(United Kingdom) RML	(United Kingdom) Mike Newton (Brazil) Thomas Erdos	Judd XV675 3.4L V8	MI	113
19	GT2	79	(Germany) JP Racing	(Germany) Jens Petersen (Germany) Jan-Dirk Leuders (Switzerland) Niki Leutwiler	Porsche 911 GT3-RS	P	113
19	GT2	79	(Germany) JP Racing	(Germany) Jens Petersen (Germany) Jan-Dirk Leuders (Switzerland) Niki Leutwiler	Porsche 3.6L Flat-6	P	113
20	LMP2	46	(Italy) Scuderia Villorba Corse	(Italy) Mauro Prospero (Belgium) Sébastien Ugeux	Lucchini SR2001	A	111
20	LMP2	46	(Italy) Scuderia Villorba Corse	(Italy) Mauro Prospero (Belgium) Sébastien Ugeux	Alfa Romeo 3.0L V6	A	111
21	LMP2	36	(France) Paul Belmondo Racing	(France) Claude-Yves Gosselin (Belgium) Vincent Vosse (Saudi Arabia) Karim Ojjeh	Courage C65	MI	105
21	LMP2	36	(France) Paul Belmondo Racing	(France) Claude-Yves Gosselin (Belgium) Vincent Vosse (Saudi Arabia) Karim Ojjeh	Ford (AER) 2.0L Turbo I4	MI	105
22	GT2	84	(France) Bernard Jubin	(France) Sylvain Noël (France) Bruno Houzelot	Porsche 911 GT3-RS	D	104
22	GT2	84	(France) Bernard Jubin	(France) Sylvain Noël (France) Bruno Houzelot	Porsche 3.6L Flat-6	D	104
23 NC	GT2	93	(United Kingdom) Scuderia Ecosse	(United Kingdom) Andrew Kirkaldy (United Kingdom) Nathan Kinch	Ferrari 360 Modena GTC	P	98
23 NC	GT2	93	(United Kingdom) Scuderia Ecosse	(United Kingdom) Andrew Kirkaldy (United Kingdom) Nathan Kinch	Ferrari 3.6L V8	P	98
24 NC	LMP2	28	(Italy) Ranieri Randaccio	(Italy) Fabio Mancini (Italy) Ranieri Randaccio	Tampolli SR2	D	98
24 NC	LMP2	28	(Italy) Ranieri Randaccio	(Italy) Fabio Mancini (Italy) Ranieri Randaccio	Nicholson-McLaren 3.3L V8	D	98
25 NC	GT1	65	(United Kingdom) Graham Nash Motorsport	(United States) Rick Sutherland (United Kingdom) Ricky Cole (Italy) Gian Maria Gabbiani	Saleen S7-R	P	89
25 NC	GT1	65	(United Kingdom) Graham Nash Motorsport	(United States) Rick Sutherland (United Kingdom) Ricky Cole (Italy) Gian Maria Gabbiani	Ford 7.0L V8	P	89
26 NC	GT2	91	(Japan) T2M Motorsport	(Japan) Yatuka Yamagishi (France) Xavier Pompidou (United Kingdom) Adam Jones	Porsche 911 GT3-RS	Y	85
26 NC	GT2	91	(Japan) T2M Motorsport	(Japan) Yatuka Yamagishi (France) Xavier Pompidou (United Kingdom) Adam Jones	Porsche 3.6L Flat-6	Y	85
27 NC	GT1	56	(France) Paul Belmondo Racing	(France) Pierre Perret (France) Jean-Baptiste Émeric (Switzerland) Benjamin Leuenberger	Chrysler Viper GTS-R	MI	63
27 NC	GT1	56	(France) Paul Belmondo Racing	(France) Pierre Perret (France) Jean-Baptiste Émeric (Switzerland) Benjamin Leuenberger	Chrysler 8.0L V10	MI	63
28 DNF	LMP1	7	(United Kingdom) Creation Autosportif	(France) Nicolas Minassian (United Kingdom) Jamie Campbell-Walter	DBA 03S	MI	115
28 DNF	LMP1	7	(United Kingdom) Creation Autosportif	(France) Nicolas Minassian (United Kingdom) Jamie Campbell-Walter	Judd GV5 5.0L V10	MI	115
29 DNF	LMP1	4	(France) Audi PlayStation Team Oreca	(Monaco) Stéphane Ortelli (France) Jean-Marc Gounon	Audi R8	MI	109
29 DNF	LMP1	4	(France) Audi PlayStation Team Oreca	(Monaco) Stéphane Ortelli (France) Jean-Marc Gounon	Audi 3.6L Turbo V8	MI	109
30 DNF	LMP1	18	(United Kingdom) Rollcentre Racing	(Portugal) João Barbosa (Germany) Michael Krumm (United Kingdom) Andrew Thompson	Dallara SP1	MI	96
30 DNF	LMP1	18	(United Kingdom) Rollcentre Racing	(Portugal) João Barbosa (Germany) Michael Krumm (United Kingdom) Andrew Thompson	Nissan 3.0L Turbo V6	MI	96
31 DNF	LMP2	37	(France) Paul Belmondo Racing	(France) Paul Belmondo (France) Didier André (France) Romain Iannetta	Courage C65	MI	89
31 DNF	LMP2	37	(France) Paul Belmondo Racing	(France) Paul Belmondo (France) Didier André (France) Romain Iannetta	Ford (AER) 2.0L Turbo I4	MI	89
32 DNF	LMP2	35	(Belgium) G-Force Racing (Belgium) Renstal de Bokkenrijders	(Belgium) Loïc Deman (Netherlands) Val Hillebrand (France) Jean-François Leroch	Courage C65	D	86
32 DNF	LMP2	35	(Belgium) G-Force Racing (Belgium) Renstal de Bokkenrijders	(Belgium) Loïc Deman (Netherlands) Val Hillebrand (France) Jean-François Leroch	Judd XV675 3.4L V8	D	86
33 DNF	GT2	89	(United Kingdom) Sebah Automotive	(Denmark) Lars-Erik Nielsen (Germany) Pierre Ehret (Denmark) Thorkild Thyrring	Porsche 911 GT3-RSR	D	83
33 DNF	GT2	89	(United Kingdom) Sebah Automotive	(Denmark) Lars-Erik Nielsen (Germany) Pierre Ehret (Denmark) Thorkild Thyrring	Porsche 3.6L Flat-6	D	83
34 DNF	GT1	66	(United Kingdom) Graham Nash Motorsport	(Italy) Paolo Ruberti (Italy) Matteo Bobbi (Belgium) Stéphane Lémeret	Saleen S7-R	P	76
34 DNF	GT1	66	(United Kingdom) Graham Nash Motorsport	(Italy) Paolo Ruberti (Italy) Matteo Bobbi (Belgium) Stéphane Lémeret	Ford 7.0L V8	P	76
35 DNF	GT1	53	(Germany) A-Level Engineering	(Germany) Wolfgang Kaufmann (Belgium) Eric van de Poele	Porsche 911 Bi-Turbo	D	64
35 DNF	GT1	53	(Germany) A-Level Engineering	(Germany) Wolfgang Kaufmann (Belgium) Eric van de Poele	Porsche 3.6L Turbo Flat-6	D	64
36 DNF	LMP1	6	(United Kingdom) Lister Racing	(United Kingdom) Justin Keen (Denmark) Jens Møller (Denmark) Jan Magnussen	Lister Storm LMP	D	51
36 DNF	LMP1	6	(United Kingdom) Lister Racing	(United Kingdom) Justin Keen (Denmark) Jens Møller (Denmark) Jan Magnussen	Chevrolet LS1 6.0L V8	D	51
37 DNF	GT2	98	(United Kingdom) James Watt Automotive	(United Kingdom) Paul Daniels (United Kingdom) David Gooding (Italy) Giovanni Lavaggi	Porsche 911 GT3-RS	D	43
37 DNF	GT2	98	(United Kingdom) James Watt Automotive	(United Kingdom) Paul Daniels (United Kingdom) David Gooding (Italy) Giovanni Lavaggi	Porsche 3.6L Flat-6	D	43
38 DNF	GT2	88	(United Kingdom) Gruppe M Racing	(United Kingdom) Jonathan Cocker (United Kingdom) Tim Sugden	Porsche 911 GT3-R	P	39
38 DNF	GT2	88	(United Kingdom) Gruppe M Racing	(United Kingdom) Jonathan Cocker (United Kingdom) Tim Sugden	Porsche 3.6L Flat-6	P	39
39 DNF	GT2	85	(Netherlands) Spyker Squadron b.v.	(Netherlands) Frans Munsterhuis (Netherlands) Peter Van Merksteijn	Spyker C8 Spyder GT2-R	D	31
39 DNF	GT2	85	(Netherlands) Spyker Squadron b.v.	(Netherlands) Frans Munsterhuis (Netherlands) Peter Van Merksteijn	Audi 3.8L V8	D	31
40 DNF	LMP1	9	(United Kingdom) Team Jota	(United Kingdom) John Stack (United Kingdom) Sam Hignett (Japan) Haruki Kurosawa	Zytek 04S	D	28
40 DNF	LMP1	9	(United Kingdom) Team Jota	(United Kingdom) John Stack (United Kingdom) Sam Hignett (Japan) Haruki Kurosawa	Zytek ZG348 3.4L V8	D	28
41 DNF	GT1	67	(Czech Republic) MenX	(Czech Republic) Tomáš Enge (Czech Republic) Robert Pergl	Ferrari 550-GTS Maranello	MI	26
41 DNF	GT1	67	(Czech Republic) MenX	(Czech Republic) Tomáš Enge (Czech Republic) Robert Pergl	Ferrari 5.9L V12	MI	26
42 DNF	GT2	96	(United Kingdom) IN2 Racing	(Denmark) Juan Barazi (Netherlands) Michael Vergers	Porsche 911 GT3-RSR	D	26
42 DNF	GT2	96	(United Kingdom) IN2 Racing	(Denmark) Juan Barazi (Netherlands) Michael Vergers	Porsche 3.6L Flat-6	D	26
43 DNF	LMP2	45	(Italy) Lucchini Engineering	(Italy) Piergiuseppe Peroni (Italy) Mirko Savoldi	Lucchini LMP2/04	P	24
43 DNF	LMP2	45	(Italy) Lucchini Engineering	(Italy) Piergiuseppe Peroni (Italy) Mirko Savoldi	Judd XV675 3.4L V8	P	24
44 DNF	GT1	68	(Monaco) JMB Racing	(France) Antoine Gosse (Netherlands) Peter Kutemann (Netherlands) Hans Hugenholtz	Ferrari 575-GTC Maranello	P	23
44 DNF	GT1	68	(Monaco) JMB Racing	(France) Antoine Gosse (Netherlands) Peter Kutemann (Netherlands) Hans Hugenholtz	Ferrari 6.0L V12	P	23
45 DNF	LMP1	13	(France) Courage Compétition	(France) Jonathan Cochet (United Kingdom) Christian Vann (Switzerland) Alexander Frei	Courage C60 Hybrid	Y	20
45 DNF	LMP1	13	(France) Courage Compétition	(France) Jonathan Cochet (United Kingdom) Christian Vann (Switzerland) Alexander Frei	Judd GV4 4.0L V10	Y	20
46 DNF	LMP2	21	(France) Noël del Bello Racing	(France) Jean-Luc Maury-Laribière (France) Jean-Philippe Belloc (France) Baston Brière	Courage C65	MI	14
46 DNF	LMP2	21	(France) Noël del Bello Racing	(France) Jean-Luc Maury-Laribière (France) Jean-Philippe Belloc (France) Baston Brière	Mecachrome 3.4L V8	MI	14
47 DNF	LMP2	30	(Germany) Kruse Motorsport	(United Kingdom) Philipp Bennett (United Kingdom) Gregor Fisken (Switzerland) Harold Primat	Courage C65	P	8
47 DNF	LMP2	30	(Germany) Kruse Motorsport	(United Kingdom) Philipp Bennett (United Kingdom) Gregor Fisken (Switzerland) Harold Primat	Judd XV675 3.4L V8	P	8

== Statistics ==
- Pole Position - #17 Pescarolo Sport - 2:21.076
- Fastest Lap - #15 Zytek Engineering - 2:10.270
- Average Speed - 153.129 km/h

Le Mans Series
Previous race: None	2005 season	Next race: 2005 1000km of Monza
