= 2005 1000 km of Silverstone =

Sports car endurance race held at Silverstone Circuit

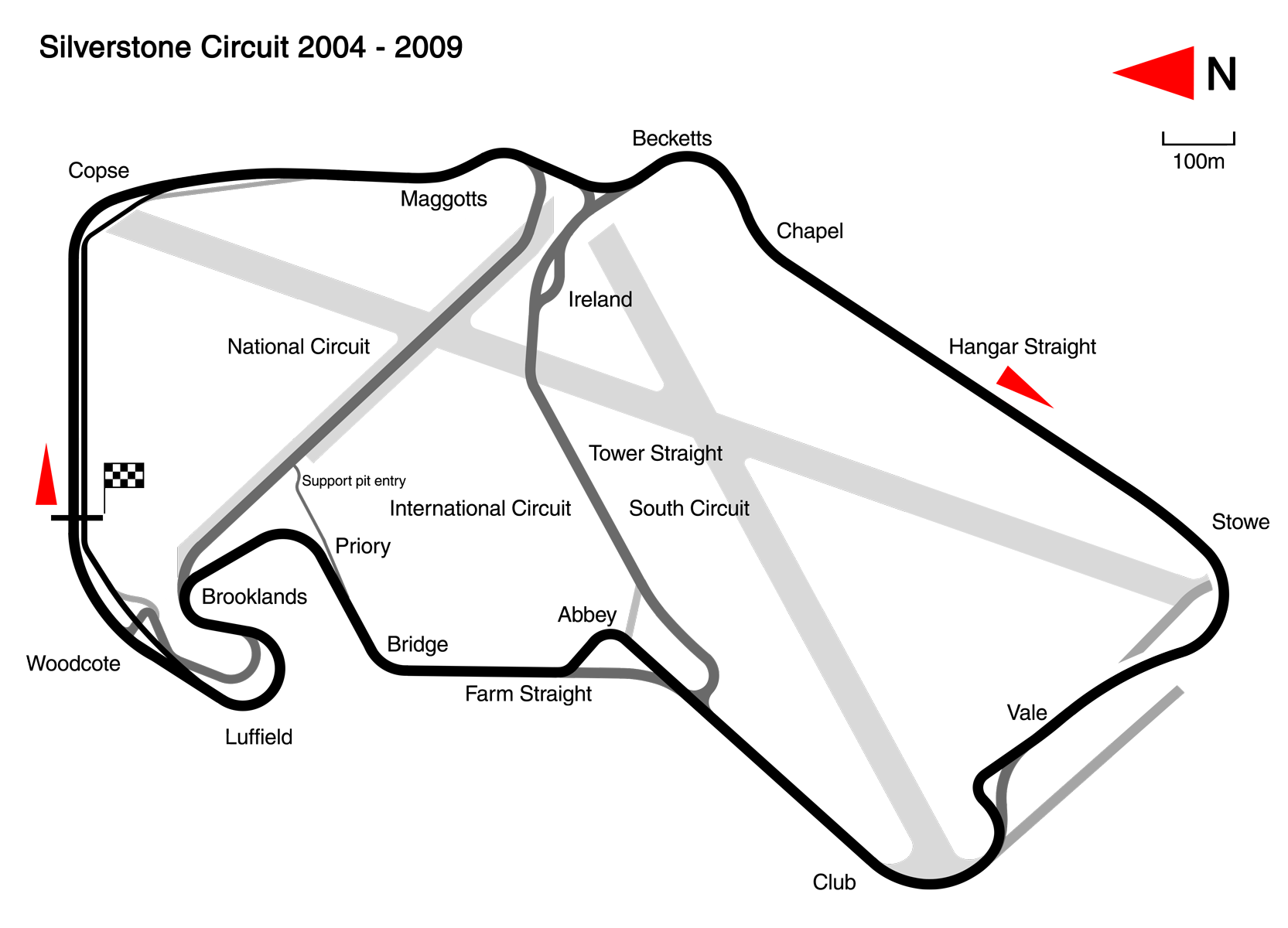
Map of the Silverstone Circuit (2004–2009)

The 2005 1000 km of Silverstone was the third round of the 2005 Le Mans Series season and held at Silverstone Circuit, United Kingdom. It was run on 13 August 2005.

== Official results ==
Class winners in bold. Cars failing to complete 70% of winner's distance marked as Not Classified (NC).

Pos	Class	No	Team	Drivers	Chassis	Tyre	Laps
Pos	Class	No	Team	Drivers	Engine	Tyre	Laps
1	**LMP1**	**4**	**(France) Audi PlayStation Team Oreca**	**(Monaco) Stéphane Ortelli (United Kingdom) Allan McNish**	**Audi R8**	MI	**151**
1	**LMP1**	**4**	**(France) Audi PlayStation Team Oreca**	**(Monaco) Stéphane Ortelli (United Kingdom) Allan McNish**	**Audi 3.6L Turbo V8**	MI	**151**
2	LMP1	7	(United Kingdom) Creation Autosportif	(France) Nicolas Minassian (United Kingdom) Jamie Campbell-Walter	DBA 03S	MI	151
2	LMP1	7	(United Kingdom) Creation Autosportif	(France) Nicolas Minassian (United Kingdom) Jamie Campbell-Walter	Judd GV5 5.0L V10	MI	151
3	LMP1	8	(United Kingdom) Rollcentre Racing	(United Kingdom) Martin Short (Portugal) João Barbosa (Belgium) Vanina Ickx	Dallara SP1	MI	144
3	LMP1	8	(United Kingdom) Rollcentre Racing	(United Kingdom) Martin Short (Portugal) João Barbosa (Belgium) Vanina Ickx	Judd GV4 4.0L V10	MI	144
4	**LMP2**	**36**	**(France) Paul Belmondo Racing**	**(France) Claude-Yves Gosselin (Saudi Arabia) Karim Ojjeh (Belgium) Vincent Vosse**	**Courage C65**	MI	**143**
4	**LMP2**	**36**	**(France) Paul Belmondo Racing**	**(France) Claude-Yves Gosselin (Saudi Arabia) Karim Ojjeh (Belgium) Vincent Vosse**	**Ford (AER) 2.0L Turbo I4**	MI	**143**
5	**GT1**	**67**	**(Czech Republic) MenX**	**(Czech Republic) Robert Pergl (Czech Republic) Jaroslav Janiš (Netherlands) Peter Kox**	**Ferrari 550-GTS Maranello**	MI	**143**
5	**GT1**	**67**	**(Czech Republic) MenX**	**(Czech Republic) Robert Pergl (Czech Republic) Jaroslav Janiš (Netherlands) Peter Kox**	Ferrari 5.9L V12	MI	**143**
6	LMP1	9	(United Kingdom) Team Jota	(United Kingdom) Sam Hignett (United Kingdom) John Stack (Japan) Haruki Kurosawa	Zytek 04S	D	142
6	LMP1	9	(United Kingdom) Team Jota	(United Kingdom) Sam Hignett (United Kingdom) John Stack (Japan) Haruki Kurosawa	Zytek ZG348 3.4L V8	D	142
7	GT1	61	(Russia) Convers Team (United Kingdom) Cirtek Motorsport	(Russia) Alexey Vasilyev (France) Christophe Bouchut	Ferrari 550-GTS Maranello	MI	142
7	GT1	61	(Russia) Convers Team (United Kingdom) Cirtek Motorsport	(Russia) Alexey Vasilyev (France) Christophe Bouchut	Ferrari 5.9L V12	MI	142
8	LMP2	30	(United Kingdom) Kruse Motorsport	(United Kingdom) Philip Bennett (Netherlands) Michael Vergers (Denmark) Juan Barazi	Courage C65	P	141
8	LMP2	30	(United Kingdom) Kruse Motorsport	(United Kingdom) Philip Bennett (Netherlands) Michael Vergers (Denmark) Juan Barazi	Judd XV675 3.4L V8	P	141
9	**GT2**	**90**	**(United Kingdom) Sebah Automotive**	**(France) Xavier Pompidou (Germany) Marc Lieb**	**Porsche 911 GT3-R**	D	**141**
9	**GT2**	**90**	**(United Kingdom) Sebah Automotive**	**(France) Xavier Pompidou (Germany) Marc Lieb**	**Porsche 3.6L Flat-6**	D	**141**
10	LMP2	25	(United Kingdom) RML	(United Kingdom) Mike Newton (Brazil) Thomas Erdos	MG-Lola EX264	MI	141
10	LMP2	25	(United Kingdom) RML	(United Kingdom) Mike Newton (Brazil) Thomas Erdos	MG (AER) XP20 2.0L Turbo I4	MI	141
11	LMP1	15	(United Kingdom) Zytek Motorsport	(United Kingdom) Tom Chilton (Japan) Hayanari Shimoda	Zytek 04S	MI	141
11	LMP1	15	(United Kingdom) Zytek Motorsport	(United Kingdom) Tom Chilton (Japan) Hayanari Shimoda	Zytek ZG348 3.4L V8	MI	141
12	GT1	53	(Germany) A-Level Engineering	(Germany) Wolfgang Kaufmann (Germany) Marcel Tiemann	Porsche 911 Bi-Turbo	MI	141
12	GT1	53	(Germany) A-Level Engineering	(Germany) Wolfgang Kaufmann (Germany) Marcel Tiemann	Porsche 3.6L Turbo Flat-6	MI	141
13	LMP2	27	(Switzerland) Horag Lista Racing	(Switzerland) Fredy Lienhard (Belgium) Didier Theys	Lola B05/40	MI	141
13	LMP2	27	(Switzerland) Horag Lista Racing	(Switzerland) Fredy Lienhard (Belgium) Didier Theys	Judd XV675 3.4L V8	MI	141
14	LMP1	13	(France) Courage Compétition	(France) Jonathan Cochet (Switzerland) Alexander Frei (United Kingdom) Christian Vann	Courage C60 Hybrid	Y	140
14	LMP1	13	(France) Courage Compétition	(France) Jonathan Cochet (Switzerland) Alexander Frei (United Kingdom) Christian Vann	Judd GV4 4.0L V10	Y	140
15	GT1	62	(Russia) Convers Team (United Kingdom) Cirtek Motorsport	(United Kingdom) Darren Turner (Russia) Nikolai Fomenko (Belgium) Marc Goossens	Aston Martin DBR9	MI	138
15	GT1	62	(Russia) Convers Team (United Kingdom) Cirtek Motorsport	(United Kingdom) Darren Turner (Russia) Nikolai Fomenko (Belgium) Marc Goossens	Aston Martin 6.0L V12	MI	138
16	GT2	76	(Italy) Autorlando Sport	(Italy) Franco Groppi (Italy) Luigi Moccia (Germany) Mike Rockenfeller	Porsche 911 GT3-RSR	P	138
16	GT2	76	(Italy) Autorlando Sport	(Italy) Franco Groppi (Italy) Luigi Moccia (Germany) Mike Rockenfeller	Porsche 3.6L Flat-6	P	138
17	GT1	52	(Italy) BMS Scuderia Italia	(Italy) Matteo Cressoni (Italy) Matteo Malucelli (Portugal) Miguel Ramos	Ferrari 550-GTS Maranello	P	138
17	GT1	52	(Italy) BMS Scuderia Italia	(Italy) Matteo Cressoni (Italy) Matteo Malucelli (Portugal) Miguel Ramos	Ferrari 5.9L V12	P	138
18	LMP1	6	(United Kingdom) Lister Racing	(United Kingdom) Justin Keen (Denmark) Jens Møller	Lister Storm LMP Hybrid	D	138
18	LMP1	6	(United Kingdom) Lister Racing	(United Kingdom) Justin Keen (Denmark) Jens Møller	Chevrolet LS1 6.0L V8	D	138
19	LMP2	39	(United Kingdom) Chamberlain-Synergy Motorsport	(United Kingdom) Bob Berridge (United Kingdom) Gareth Evans	Lola B05/40	D	138
19	LMP2	39	(United Kingdom) Chamberlain-Synergy Motorsport	(United Kingdom) Bob Berridge (United Kingdom) Gareth Evans	AER P07 2.0L Turbo I4	D	138
20	GT2	89	(United Kingdom) Sebah Automotive	(Denmark) Lars-Erik Nielsen (Denmark) Thorkild Thyrring (Germany) Pierre Ehret	Porsche 911 GT3-RSR	D	137
20	GT2	89	(United Kingdom) Sebah Automotive	(Denmark) Lars-Erik Nielsen (Denmark) Thorkild Thyrring (Germany) Pierre Ehret	Porsche 3.6L Flat-6	D	137
21	GT2	93	(United Kingdom) Scuderia Ecosse	(United Kingdom) Andrew Kirkaldy (United Kingdom) Nathan Kinch	Ferrari 360 Modena GTC	P	137
21	GT2	93	(United Kingdom) Scuderia Ecosse	(United Kingdom) Andrew Kirkaldy (United Kingdom) Nathan Kinch	Ferrari 3.6L V8	P	137
22	GT2	73	(Belgium) Ice Pol Racing Team	(Belgium) Yves Lambert (Belgium) Christian Lefort (Finland) Markus Palttala	Porsche 911 GT3-RSR	D	136
22	GT2	73	(Belgium) Ice Pol Racing Team	(Belgium) Yves Lambert (Belgium) Christian Lefort (Finland) Markus Palttala	Porsche 3.6L Flat-6	D	136
23	GT2	99	(Italy) G.P.C. Sport	(Italy) Gabrio Rosa (Italy) Luca Drudi (Italy) Fabio Babini	Ferrari 360 Modena GTC	P	135
23	GT2	99	(Italy) G.P.C. Sport	(Italy) Gabrio Rosa (Italy) Luca Drudi (Italy) Fabio Babini	Ferrari 3.6L V8	P	135
24	GT2	95	(United Kingdom) Racesport Peninsula TVR	(United Kingdom) Richard Stanton (United Kingdom) Piers Johnson (United Kingdom) Daniel Eagling	TVR Tuscan T400R	D	135
24	GT2	95	(United Kingdom) Racesport Peninsula TVR	(United Kingdom) Richard Stanton (United Kingdom) Piers Johnson (United Kingdom) Daniel Eagling	TVR Speed Six 4.0L I6	D	135
25	GT1	51	(Italy) BMS Scuderia Italia	(Italy) Michele Bartyan (Italy) Christian Pescatori (Switzerland) Toni Seiler	Ferrari 550-GTS Maranello	P	135
25	GT1	51	(Italy) BMS Scuderia Italia	(Italy) Michele Bartyan (Italy) Christian Pescatori (Switzerland) Toni Seiler	Ferrari 5.9L V12	P	135
26	LMP2	20	(France) Pir Competition	(France) Pierre Bruneau (France) Marc Rostan (France) Jean-Philippe Peugeot	Pilbeam MP93	MI	133
26	LMP2	20	(France) Pir Competition	(France) Pierre Bruneau (France) Marc Rostan (France) Jean-Philippe Peugeot	JPX (Mader) 3.4L V6	MI	133
27	GT2	83	(Germany) Seikel Motorsport	(Austria) Horst Felbermayr Sr. (Austria) Horst Felbermayr Jr. (United States) Philip Collin	Porsche 911 GT3-RS	Y	132
27	GT2	83	(Germany) Seikel Motorsport	(Austria) Horst Felbermayr Sr. (Austria) Horst Felbermayr Jr. (United States) Philip Collin	Porsche 3.6L Flat-6	Y	132
28	LMP2	37	(France) Paul Belmondo Racing	(France) Paul Belmondo (France) Didier André (United Kingdom) Adam Sharpe	Courage C65	MI	132
28	LMP2	37	(France) Paul Belmondo Racing	(France) Paul Belmondo (France) Didier André (United Kingdom) Adam Sharpe	Ford (AER) 2.0L Turbo I4	MI	132
29	GT2	79	(Germany) JP Racing	(Germany) Jens Petersen (Germany) Niki Leutwiler (Germany) Jan-Dirk Lueders	Porsche 911 GT3-RS	P	131
29	GT2	79	(Germany) JP Racing	(Germany) Jens Petersen (Germany) Niki Leutwiler (Germany) Jan-Dirk Lueders	Porsche 3.6L Flat-6	P	131
30	LMP2	35	(Belgium) G-Force Racing	(Belgium) Franck Hahn (France) Jean-François Leroch (United Kingdom) Tim Greaves	Courage C65	D	128
30	LMP2	35	(Belgium) G-Force Racing	(Belgium) Franck Hahn (France) Jean-François Leroch (United Kingdom) Tim Greaves	Judd XV675 3.4L V8	D	128
31	GT1	57	(France) Paul Belmondo Racing	(France) Jean-Michel Papolla (France) Didier Sommereau (France) Yann Clairay	Chrysler Viper GTS-R	MI	127
31	GT1	57	(France) Paul Belmondo Racing	(France) Jean-Michel Papolla (France) Didier Sommereau (France) Yann Clairay	Chrysler 8.0L V10	MI	127
32	GT2	98	(United Kingdom) James Watt Automotive	(United Kingdom) Paul Daniels (Denmark) Allan Simonsen	Porsche 911 GT3-RS	D	121
32	GT2	98	(United Kingdom) James Watt Automotive	(United Kingdom) Paul Daniels (Denmark) Allan Simonsen	Porsche 3.6L Flat-6	D	121
33	GT2	82	(United Kingdom) Team LNT	(United Kingdom) Patrick Pearce (United Kingdom) Marc Hynes (United Kingdom) Lawrence Tomlinson	TVR Tuscan T400R	D	114
33	GT2	82	(United Kingdom) Team LNT	(United Kingdom) Patrick Pearce (United Kingdom) Marc Hynes (United Kingdom) Lawrence Tomlinson	TVR 4.0L I6	D	114
34	LMP1	17	(France) Pescarolo Sport	(France) Emmanuel Collard (France) Jean-Christophe Boullion	Pescarolo C60 Hybrid	MI	113
34	LMP1	17	(France) Pescarolo Sport	(France) Emmanuel Collard (France) Jean-Christophe Boullion	Judd GV5 5.0L V10	MI	113
35	GT1	65	(United Kingdom) Graham Nash Motorsport	(United Kingdom) Ricky Cole (United Kingdom) Ryan Hooker (United Kingdom) Calum Lockie	Saleen S7-R	P	108
35	GT1	65	(United Kingdom) Graham Nash Motorsport	(United Kingdom) Ricky Cole (United Kingdom) Ryan Hooker (United Kingdom) Calum Lockie	Ford 6.9L V8	P	108
36 DNF	GT2	97	(United Kingdom) Tech9 Motorsport	(United Kingdom) Peter Cook (United Kingdom) Mike Youles (United Kingdom) Phil Hindley	Porsche 911 GT3-RS	D	126
36 DNF	GT2	97	(United Kingdom) Tech9 Motorsport	(United Kingdom) Peter Cook (United Kingdom) Mike Youles (United Kingdom) Phil Hindley	Porsche 3.6L Flat-6	D	126
37 DNF	GT2	88	(United Kingdom) Gruppe M Racing	(United Kingdom) Jonathan Cocker (United Kingdom) Tim Sugden	Porsche 911 GT3-R	P	121
37 DNF	GT2	88	(United Kingdom) Gruppe M Racing	(United Kingdom) Jonathan Cocker (United Kingdom) Tim Sugden	Porsche 3.6L Flat-6	P	121
38 DNF	LMP2	41	(United States) Binnie Motorsports	(United States) William Binnie (United Kingdom) Allen Timpany (United Kingdom) Sam Hancock	Lola B05/40	P	112
38 DNF	LMP2	41	(United States) Binnie Motorsports	(United States) William Binnie (United Kingdom) Allen Timpany (United Kingdom) Sam Hancock	Nicholson-McLaren 3.3L V8	P	112
39 DNF	GT2	81	(United Kingdom) Team LNT	(United Kingdom) Jonny Kane (United Kingdom) Warren Hughes	TVR Tuscan T400R	D	75
39 DNF	GT2	81	(United Kingdom) Team LNT	(United Kingdom) Jonny Kane (United Kingdom) Warren Hughes	TVR Speed Six 4.0L I6	D	75
40 DNF	LMP1	19	(United Kingdom) Chamberlain-Synergy Motorsport	(United Kingdom) Amanda Stretton (Spain) Balba Camino	Lola B98/10	D	74
40 DNF	LMP1	19	(United Kingdom) Chamberlain-Synergy Motorsport	(United Kingdom) Amanda Stretton (Spain) Balba Camino	Judd GV4 4.0L V10	D	74
41 DNF	GT2	86	(Hong Kong) Noble Group (United Kingdom) Gruppe M Racing	(Hong Kong) Darryl O'Young (United Kingdom) Matthew Marsh	Porsche 911 GT3-RSR	P	33
41 DNF	GT2	86	(Hong Kong) Noble Group (United Kingdom) Gruppe M Racing	(Hong Kong) Darryl O'Young (United Kingdom) Matthew Marsh	Porsche 3.6L Flat-6	P	33
42 DNF	LMP2	22	(United Kingdom) Tracsport	(United Kingdom) Del Delaronde (United Kingdom) Edward Morris (United Kingdom) Richard Jones	Tampolli SR2	D	31
42 DNF	LMP2	22	(United Kingdom) Tracsport	(United Kingdom) Del Delaronde (United Kingdom) Edward Morris (United Kingdom) Richard Jones	Nissan (AER) VQL 3.0L V6	D	31
43 DNF	LMP1	18	(United Kingdom) Rollcentre Racing	(France) Bruce Jouanny (Switzerland) Harold Primat	Dallara SP1	MI	16
43 DNF	LMP1	18	(United Kingdom) Rollcentre Racing	(France) Bruce Jouanny (Switzerland) Harold Primat	Judd GV4 4.0L V10	MI	16
44 DNF	LMP2	31	(France) Noël del Bello Racing	(France) Christophe Tinseau (France) Bastien Brière (Portugal) Ni Amorim	Courage C65	MI	15
44 DNF	LMP2	31	(France) Noël del Bello Racing	(France) Christophe Tinseau (France) Bastien Brière (Portugal) Ni Amorim	Mecachrome 3.4L V8	MI	15
45 DNF	GT1	68	(Monaco) JMB Racing	(France) Antoine Gosse (Netherlands) Peter Kutemann (Netherlands) Hans Hugenholtz	Ferrari 575-GTC Maranello	P	2
45 DNF	GT1	68	(Monaco) JMB Racing	(France) Antoine Gosse (Netherlands) Peter Kutemann (Netherlands) Hans Hugenholtz	Ferrari 6.0L V12	P	2
46 DNF	LMP1	10	(Netherlands) Racing for Holland	(Netherlands) Jan Lammers (Italy) Beppe Gabbiani (Bolivia) Felipe Ortiz	Dome S101	D	1
46 DNF	LMP1	10	(Netherlands) Racing for Holland	(Netherlands) Jan Lammers (Italy) Beppe Gabbiani (Bolivia) Felipe Ortiz	Judd GV4 4.0L V10	D	1
DNS	LMP2	28	(Italy) Ranieri Randaccio	(Italy) Ranieri Randaccio (Italy) Matteo Maria Tullio	Tampolli SR2	D	-
DNS	LMP2	28	(Italy) Ranieri Randaccio	(Italy) Ranieri Randaccio (Italy) Matteo Maria Tullio	Nicholson-McLaren 3.3L V8	D	-
DNS	GT1	56	(France) Paul Belmondo Racing	(France) Pierre Perret (Switzerland) Karim Ajlani (Switzerland) Benjamin Leuenberger	Chrysler Viper GTS-R	MI	-
DNS	GT1	56	(France) Paul Belmondo Racing	(France) Pierre Perret (Switzerland) Karim Ajlani (Switzerland) Benjamin Leuenberger	Chrysler 8.0L V10	MI	-

== Statistics ==
- Pole Position - #7 Creation Autosportif - 1:34.562
- Fastest Lap - #4 Audi PlayStation Team Oreca - 1:53.635
- Average Speed - 132.626 km/h

Le Mans Endurance Series
Previous race: 2005 1000km of Monza	2005 season	Next race: 2005 1000km of Nürburgring
