= 2005 1000 km of Istanbul =

Track map of the Istanbul Park

The 2005 1000 km of Istanbul was the fifth and final round of the 2005 Le Mans Series season, held at the Istanbul Park, Turkey. It was run on November 13, 2005. Pescarolo Sport won the qualifying and the race.

== Official results ==
Class winners in bold. Cars failing to complete 70% of winner's distance marked as Not Classified (NC).

Pos	Class	No	Team	Drivers	Chassis	Tyre	Laps
Pos	Class	No	Team	Drivers	Engine	Tyre	Laps
1	**LMP1**	**17**	**(France) Pescarolo Sport**	**(France) Emmanuel Collard (France) Jean-Christophe Boullion**	**Pescarolo C60 Hybrid**	**MI**	**173**
1	**LMP1**	**17**	**(France) Pescarolo Sport**	**(France) Emmanuel Collard (France) Jean-Christophe Boullion**	**Judd GV5 5.0L V10**	**MI**	**173**
2	LMP1	4	(France) Audi PlayStation Team Oreca	(Monaco) Stéphane Ortelli (United Kingdom) Allan McNish	Audi R8	**MI**	173
2	LMP1	4	(France) Audi PlayStation Team Oreca	(Monaco) Stéphane Ortelli (United Kingdom) Allan McNish	Audi 3.6L Turbo V8	**MI**	173
3	LMP1	7	(United Kingdom) Creation Autosportif	(France) Nicolas Minassian (United Kingdom) Jamie Campbell-Walter (Switzerland) Jean-Denis Délétraz	DBA 03S	**MI**	171
3	LMP1	7	(United Kingdom) Creation Autosportif	(France) Nicolas Minassian (United Kingdom) Jamie Campbell-Walter (Switzerland) Jean-Denis Délétraz	Judd GV5 5.0L V10	**MI**	171
4	LMP1	15	(United Kingdom) Zytek Motorsport	(United Kingdom) Tom Chilton (Japan) Hayanari Shimoda (Denmark) Casper Elgaard	Zytek 04S	**MI**	171
4	LMP1	15	(United Kingdom) Zytek Motorsport	(United Kingdom) Tom Chilton (Japan) Hayanari Shimoda (Denmark) Casper Elgaard	Zytek ZG3448 3.4L V8	**MI**	171
5	LMP1	9	(United Kingdom) Team Jota	(United Kingdom) Gregor Fisken (United Kingdom) Sam Hancock (Turkey) Jason Tahincioglu	Zytek 04S	**D**	169
5	LMP1	9	(United Kingdom) Team Jota	(United Kingdom) Gregor Fisken (United Kingdom) Sam Hancock (Turkey) Jason Tahincioglu	Zytek ZG348 3.4L V8	**D**	169
6	**LMP2**	**25**	**(United Kingdom) RML**	**(United Kingdom) Mike Newton (Brazil) Thomas Erdos**	**MG-Lola EX264**	**MI**	**164**
6	**LMP2**	**25**	**(United Kingdom) RML**	**(United Kingdom) Mike Newton (Brazil) Thomas Erdos**	**MG (AER) XP20 2.0L Turbo I4**	**MI**	**164**
7	LMP2	39	(United Kingdom) Chamberlain-Synergy Motorsport	(United Kingdom) Gareth Evans (United Kingdom) Guy Smith (United Kingdom) Peter Owen	Lola B05/40	**D**	164
7	LMP2	39	(United Kingdom) Chamberlain-Synergy Motorsport	(United Kingdom) Gareth Evans (United Kingdom) Guy Smith (United Kingdom) Peter Owen	AER P07 2.0L Turbo I4	**D**	164
8	LMP1	8	(United Kingdom) Rollcentre Racing	(United Kingdom) Martin Short (Portugal) João Barbosa (Belgium) Vanina Ickx	Dallara SP1	**MI**	164
8	LMP1	8	(United Kingdom) Rollcentre Racing	(United Kingdom) Martin Short (Portugal) João Barbosa (Belgium) Vanina Ickx	Judd GV4 4.0L V10	**MI**	164
9	LMP2	27	(Switzerland) Horag Lista Racing	(Belgium) Didier Theys (Sweden) Thed Björk	Lola B05/40	**MI**	163
9	LMP2	27	(Switzerland) Horag Lista Racing	(Belgium) Didier Theys (Sweden) Thed Björk	Judd XV675 3.4L V8	**MI**	163
10	**GT1**	**51**	**(Italy) BMS Scuderia Italia**	**(Italy) Michele Bartyan (Italy) Christian Pescatori (Switzerland) Toni Seiler**	**Ferrari 550-GTS Maranello**	**P**	**161**
10	**GT1**	**51**	**(Italy) BMS Scuderia Italia**	**(Italy) Michele Bartyan (Italy) Christian Pescatori (Switzerland) Toni Seiler**	**Ferrari 5.9L V12**	**P**	**161**
11	LMP2	32	(United Kingdom) Team Barazi	(Denmark) Juan Barazi (Netherlands) Michael Vergers	Courage C65	?	160
11	LMP2	32	(United Kingdom) Team Barazi	(Denmark) Juan Barazi (Netherlands) Michael Vergers	AER P07 2.0L Turbo I4	?	160
12	GT1	52	(Italy) BMS Scuderia Italia	(Italy) Matteo Cressoni (Italy) Fabio Babini (Portugal) Miguel Ramos	Ferrari 550-GTS Maranello	**P**	160
12	GT1	52	(Italy) BMS Scuderia Italia	(Italy) Matteo Cressoni (Italy) Fabio Babini (Portugal) Miguel Ramos	Ferrari 5.9L V12	**P**	160
13	GT1	67	(Czech Republic) MenX Racing	(Czech Republic) Robert Pergl (Netherlands) Peter Kox (Portugal) Pedro Lamy	Ferrari 550-GTS Maranello	**MI**	158
13	GT1	67	(Czech Republic) MenX Racing	(Czech Republic) Robert Pergl (Netherlands) Peter Kox (Portugal) Pedro Lamy	Ferrari 5.9L V12	**MI**	158
14	GT1	61	(Russia) Convers Team (United Kingdom) Cirtek Motorsport	(Russia) Alexey Vasilyev (France) Christophe Bouchut (United Kingdom) Darren Turner	Ferrari 550-GTS Maranello	**MI**	158
14	GT1	61	(Russia) Convers Team (United Kingdom) Cirtek Motorsport	(Russia) Alexey Vasilyev (France) Christophe Bouchut (United Kingdom) Darren Turner	Ferrari 5.9L V12	**MI**	158
15	LMP1	18	(United Kingdom) Rollcentre Racing	(Switzerland) Harold Primat (France) Bruce Jouanny	Dallara SP1	**MI**	156
15	LMP1	18	(United Kingdom) Rollcentre Racing	(Switzerland) Harold Primat (France) Bruce Jouanny	Judd GV4 4.0L V10	**MI**	156
16	**GT2**	**93**	**(United Kingdom) Scuderia Ecosse**	**(United Kingdom) Andrew Kirkaldy (United Kingdom) Nathan Kinch**	**Ferrari 360 Modena GTC**	**P**	**156**
16	**GT2**	**93**	**(United Kingdom) Scuderia Ecosse**	**(United Kingdom) Andrew Kirkaldy (United Kingdom) Nathan Kinch**	**Ferrari 3.6L V8**	**P**	**156**
17	GT2	99	(Italy) G.P.C. Sport	(Italy) Gabrio Rosa (Italy) Luca Drudi (Brazil) Jaime Melo	Ferrari 360 Modena GTC	**P**	156
17	GT2	99	(Italy) G.P.C. Sport	(Italy) Gabrio Rosa (Italy) Luca Drudi (Brazil) Jaime Melo	Ferrari 3.6L V8	**P**	156
18	GT2	83	(Germany) Seikel Motorsport	(Austria) Horst Felbermayr Sr. (United States) Philip Collin	Porsche 911 GT3-RS	**Y**	153
18	GT2	83	(Germany) Seikel Motorsport	(Austria) Horst Felbermayr Sr. (United States) Philip Collin	Porsche 3.6L Flat-6	**Y**	153
19	GT2	89	(United Kingdom) Sebah Automotive	(Denmark) Lars-Erik Nielsen (Denmark) Thorkild Thyrring (Germany) Pierre Ehret	Porsche 911 GT3-RSR	**D**	152
19	GT2	89	(United Kingdom) Sebah Automotive	(Denmark) Lars-Erik Nielsen (Denmark) Thorkild Thyrring (Germany) Pierre Ehret	Porsche 3.6L Flat-6	**D**	152
20	LMP2	36	(France) Paul Belmondo Racing	(France) Claude-Yves Gosselin (Saudi Arabia) Karim Ojjeh (Belgium) Vincent Vosse	Courage C65	**MI**	151
20	LMP2	36	(France) Paul Belmondo Racing	(France) Claude-Yves Gosselin (Saudi Arabia) Karim Ojjeh (Belgium) Vincent Vosse	Ford (AER) 2.0L Turbo I4	**MI**	151
21	LMP1	13	(France) Courage Compétition	(France) Jean-Marc Gounon (Switzerland) Alexander Frei	Courage C60 Hybrid	**Y**	149
21	LMP1	13	(France) Courage Compétition	(France) Jean-Marc Gounon (Switzerland) Alexander Frei	Judd GV4 4.0L V10	**Y**	149
22	LMP2	28	(Italy) Ranieri Randaccio	(Italy) Ranieri Randaccio (Italy) Fabio Mancini	Tampolli SR2	**D**	148
22	LMP2	28	(Italy) Ranieri Randaccio	(Italy) Ranieri Randaccio (Italy) Fabio Mancini	Nicholson-McLaren 3.3L V8	**D**	148
23	GT1	68	(Monaco) JMB Racing	(France) Antoine Gosse (France) Stéphane Daoudi (Netherlands) Peter Kutemann	Ferrari 575-GTC Maranello	**P**	146
23	GT1	68	(Monaco) JMB Racing	(France) Antoine Gosse (France) Stéphane Daoudi (Netherlands) Peter Kutemann	Ferrari 6.0L V12	**P**	146
24	GT2	73	(Belgium) Ice Pol Racing Team	(Belgium) Yves Lambert (Belgium) Christian Lefort (Finland) Markus Palttala	Porsche 911 GT3-RSR	**D**	143
24	GT2	73	(Belgium) Ice Pol Racing Team	(Belgium) Yves Lambert (Belgium) Christian Lefort (Finland) Markus Palttala	Porsche 3.6L Flat-6	**D**	143
25	GT1	57	(France) Paul Belmondo Racing	(France) Didier Sommereau (France) Jean-Michel Papolla (France) Stéphane Wasover	Chrysler Viper GTS-R	**MI**	135
25	GT1	57	(France) Paul Belmondo Racing	(France) Didier Sommereau (France) Jean-Michel Papolla (France) Stéphane Wasover	Chrysler 8.0L V10	**MI**	135
26 NC^{†}	GT2	95	(United Kingdom) Racesport Peninsula TVR	(United Kingdom) John Hartshorne (United Kingdom) Richard Stanton (United Kingdom) Rick Pearson	TVR Tuscan T400R	**D**	146
26 NC^{†}	GT2	95	(United Kingdom) Racesport Peninsula TVR	(United Kingdom) John Hartshorne (United Kingdom) Richard Stanton (United Kingdom) Rick Pearson	TVR 4.0L I6	**D**	146
27 DNF	GT2	85	(Netherlands) Spyker Squadron b.v.	(Netherlands) Jeroen Bleekemolen (Netherlands) Donny Crevels	Spyker C8 Spyder GT2-R	**D**	88
27 DNF	GT2	85	(Netherlands) Spyker Squadron b.v.	(Netherlands) Jeroen Bleekemolen (Netherlands) Donny Crevels	Audi 3.8L V8	**D**	88
28 DNF	LMP2	37	(France) Paul Belmondo Racing	(France) Paul Belmondo (Turkey) Ahmet Cemil Cipa (France) Didier André	Courage C65	**MI**	75
28 DNF	LMP2	37	(France) Paul Belmondo Racing	(France) Paul Belmondo (Turkey) Ahmet Cemil Cipa (France) Didier André	Ford (AER) 2.0L Turbo I4	**MI**	75
29 DNF	GT2	76	(Italy) Autorlando Sport	(Italy) Franco Groppi (Italy) Luigi Moccia (Switzerland) Joël Camathias	Porsche 911 GT3-RS	**P**	74
29 DNF	GT2	76	(Italy) Autorlando Sport	(Italy) Franco Groppi (Italy) Luigi Moccia (Switzerland) Joël Camathias	Porsche 3.6L Flat-6	**P**	74
30 DNF	LMP2	35	(Belgium) G-Force Racing	(Belgium) Frank Hahn (France) Jean-François Leroch (United Kingdom) Tim Greaves	Courage C65	**D**	46
30 DNF	LMP2	35	(Belgium) G-Force Racing	(Belgium) Frank Hahn (France) Jean-François Leroch (United Kingdom) Tim Greaves	Judd XV675 3.4L V8	**D**	46
31 DNF	LMP2	20	(France) Pir Competition	(France) Pierre Bruneau (France) Marc Rostan (United Kingdom) Simon Pullan	Pilbeam MP93	**MI**	36
31 DNF	LMP2	20	(France) Pir Competition	(France) Pierre Bruneau (France) Marc Rostan (United Kingdom) Simon Pullan	JPX (Mader) 3.4L V6	**MI**	36
32 DNF	GT2	81	(United Kingdom) Team LNT	(United Kingdom) Lawrence Tomlinson (United Kingdom) Jonny Kane (United Kingdom) Warren Hughes	TVR Tuscan T400R	**D**	32
32 DNF	GT2	81	(United Kingdom) Team LNT	(United Kingdom) Lawrence Tomlinson (United Kingdom) Jonny Kane (United Kingdom) Warren Hughes	TVR 4.0L I6	**D**	32
33 DNF	LMP2	26	(Switzerland) Equipe Palmyr	(Switzerland) Christophe Ricard (Switzerland) Philippe Favre (France) Grégory Fargier	Lucchini SR2000	?	26
33 DNF	LMP2	26	(Switzerland) Equipe Palmyr	(Switzerland) Christophe Ricard (Switzerland) Philippe Favre (France) Grégory Fargier	Alfa Romeo 3.0L V6	?	26
DNS	GT2	82	(United Kingdom) Team LNT	(United Kingdom) Marc Hynes (United Kingdom) Patrick Pearce (United Kingdom) Tom Kimber-Smith	TVR Tuscan T400R	**D**	-
DNS	GT2	82	(United Kingdom) Team LNT	(United Kingdom) Marc Hynes (United Kingdom) Patrick Pearce (United Kingdom) Tom Kimber-Smith	TVR 4.0L I6	**D**	-

† - #95 Racesport Peninsula TVR was listed as not classified due to failing to complete the final lap.

== Statistics ==
- Pole Position - #17 Pescarolo Sport - 1:39.359
- Fastest Lap - #17 Pescarolo Sport - 1:51.813
- Average Speed - 153.255 km/h

Le Mans Endurance Series
Previous race: 2005 1000km of Nürburgring	2005 season	Next race: None
