= 2005 1000 km of Monza =

Layout of the Autodromo Nazionale Monza

The 2005 1000 km of Monza was the second round of the 2005 Le Mans Series season and held at Autodromo Nazionale Monza. It was run on July 10, 2005.

== Official results ==
Class winners in bold. Cars failing to complete 70% of winner's distance marked as Not Classified (NC).

Pos	Class	No	Team	Drivers	Chassis	Tyre	Laps
Pos	Class	No	Team	Drivers	Engine	Tyre	Laps
1	**LMP1**	**17**	**(France) Pescarolo Sport**	**(France) Emmanuel Collard (France) Jean-Christophe Boullion**	**Pescarolo C60 Hybrid**	MI	**173**
1	**LMP1**	**17**	**(France) Pescarolo Sport**	**(France) Emmanuel Collard (France) Jean-Christophe Boullion**	**Judd GV5 5.0L V10**	MI	**173**
2	LMP1	9	(United Kingdom) Team Jota	(United Kingdom) Sam Hignett (United Kingdom) John Stack (Japan) Haruki Kurosawa	Zytek 04S	D	168
2	LMP1	9	(United Kingdom) Team Jota	(United Kingdom) Sam Hignett (United Kingdom) John Stack (Japan) Haruki Kurosawa	Zytek ZG348 3.4L V8	D	168
3	LMP1	8	(United Kingdom) Rollcentre Racing	(United Kingdom) Martin Short (Portugal) João Barbosa (Belgium) Vanina Ickx	Dallara SP1	MI	166
3	LMP1	8	(United Kingdom) Rollcentre Racing	(United Kingdom) Martin Short (Portugal) João Barbosa (Belgium) Vanina Ickx	Judd GV4 4.0L V10	MI	166
4	**LMP2**	**36**	**(France) Paul Belmondo Racing**	**(Saudi Arabia) Karim Ojjeh (France) Claude-Yves Gosselin (Belgium) Vincent Vosse**	**Courage C65**	MI	**165**
4	**LMP2**	**36**	**(France) Paul Belmondo Racing**	**(Saudi Arabia) Karim Ojjeh (France) Claude-Yves Gosselin (Belgium) Vincent Vosse**	**Ford (AER) 2.0L Turbo I4**	MI	**165**
5	LMP2	39	(United Kingdom) Chamberlain-Synergy Motorsport	(United Kingdom) Bob Berridge (United Kingdom) Gareth Evans (United Kingdom) Peter Owen	Lola B05/40	D	164
5	LMP2	39	(United Kingdom) Chamberlain-Synergy Motorsport	(United Kingdom) Bob Berridge (United Kingdom) Gareth Evans (United Kingdom) Peter Owen	AER P07 2.0L Turbo I4	D	164
6	LMP1	13	(France) Courage Compétition	(France) Jean-Marc Gounon (United Kingdom) Christian Vann (Switzerland) Alexander Frei	Courage C60 Hybrid	Y	161
6	LMP1	13	(France) Courage Compétition	(France) Jean-Marc Gounon (United Kingdom) Christian Vann (Switzerland) Alexander Frei	Judd GV4 4.0L V10	Y	161
7	LMP1	7	(United Kingdom) Creation Autosportif	(France) Nicolas Minassian (United Kingdom) Jamie Campbell-Walter	DBA 03S	MI	160
7	LMP1	7	(United Kingdom) Creation Autosportif	(France) Nicolas Minassian (United Kingdom) Jamie Campbell-Walter	Judd GV5 5.0L V10	MI	160
8	**GT1**	**51**	**(Italy) BMS Scuderia Italia**	**(Italy) Christian Pescatori (Italy) Michele Bartyan (Switzerland) Toni Seiler**	**Ferrari 550-GTS Maranello**	P	**158**
8	**GT1**	**51**	**(Italy) BMS Scuderia Italia**	**(Italy) Christian Pescatori (Italy) Michele Bartyan (Switzerland) Toni Seiler**	**Ferrari 5.9L V12**	P	**158**
9	GT1	67	(Czech Republic) MenX	(Czech Republic) Robert Pergl (Czech Republic) Tomáš Enge (Czech Republic) Jaroslav Janiš	Ferrari 550-GTS Maranello	MI	158
9	GT1	67	(Czech Republic) MenX	(Czech Republic) Robert Pergl (Czech Republic) Tomáš Enge (Czech Republic) Jaroslav Janiš	Ferrari 5.9L V12	MI	158
10	LMP1	15	(United Kingdom) Zytek Motorsport	(United Kingdom) Tom Chilton (Japan) Hayanari Shimoda	Zytek 04S	MI	157
10	LMP1	15	(United Kingdom) Zytek Motorsport	(United Kingdom) Tom Chilton (Japan) Hayanari Shimoda	Zytek ZG348 3.4L V8	MI	157
11	LMP2	25	(United Kingdom) RML	(United Kingdom) Mike Newton (Brazil) Thomas Erdos	MG-Lola EX264	MI	157
11	LMP2	25	(United Kingdom) RML	(United Kingdom) Mike Newton (Brazil) Thomas Erdos	MG (AER) XP20 2.0L Turbo I4	MI	157
12	GT1	61	(Russia) Convers Team (United Kingdom) Cirtek Motorsport	(Russia) Nikolai Fomenko (Russia) Alexey Vasilyev (France) Christophe Bouchut	Ferrari 550-GTS Maranello	MI	156
12	GT1	61	(Russia) Convers Team (United Kingdom) Cirtek Motorsport	(Russia) Nikolai Fomenko (Russia) Alexey Vasilyev (France) Christophe Bouchut	Ferrari 5.9L V12	MI	156
13	LMP1	10	(Netherlands) Racing for Holland	(Netherlands) Jan Lammers (Italy) Beppe Gabbiani (Bolivia) Felipe Ortiz	Dome S101	D	154
13	LMP1	10	(Netherlands) Racing for Holland	(Netherlands) Jan Lammers (Italy) Beppe Gabbiani (Bolivia) Felipe Ortiz	Judd GV4 4.0L V10	D	154
14	GT1	52	(Italy) BMS Scuderia Italia	(Italy) Fabrizio Gollin (Italy) Matteo Cressoni (Portugal) António Coimbra	Ferrari 550-GTS Maranello	P	154
14	GT1	52	(Italy) BMS Scuderia Italia	(Italy) Fabrizio Gollin (Italy) Matteo Cressoni (Portugal) António Coimbra	Ferrari 5.9L V12	P	154
15	**GT2**	**90**	**(United Kingdom) Sebah Automotive**	**(France) Xavier Pompidou (Germany) Marc Lieb**	**Porsche 911 GT3-R**	D	**151**
15	**GT2**	**90**	**(United Kingdom) Sebah Automotive**	**(France) Xavier Pompidou (Germany) Marc Lieb**	**Porsche 3.6L Flat-6**	D	**151**
16	GT2	93	(United Kingdom) Scuderia Ecosse	(United Kingdom) Andrew Kirkaldy (United Kingdom) Nathan Kinch	Ferrari 360 Modena GTC	P	149
16	GT2	93	(United Kingdom) Scuderia Ecosse	(United Kingdom) Andrew Kirkaldy (United Kingdom) Nathan Kinch	Ferrari 3.6L V8	P	149
17	GT2	83	(Germany) Seikel Motorsport	(Austria) Horst Felbermayr Sr. (Austria) Horst Felbermayr Jr. (United States) Philip Collin	Porsche 911 GT3-RS	Y	147
17	GT2	83	(Germany) Seikel Motorsport	(Austria) Horst Felbermayr Sr. (Austria) Horst Felbermayr Jr. (United States) Philip Collin	Porsche 3.6L Flat-6	Y	147
18	GT2	73	(Belgium) Ice Pol Racing Team	(Belgium) Yves Lambert (Belgium) Christian Lefort (Finland) Markus Palttala	Porsche 911 GT3-RSR	D	147
18	GT2	73	(Belgium) Ice Pol Racing Team	(Belgium) Yves Lambert (Belgium) Christian Lefort (Finland) Markus Palttala	Porsche 3.6L Flat-6	D	147
19	GT2	79	(Germany) JP Racing	(Germany) Jens Petersen (Germany) Oliver Mathai (Germany) Jan-Dirk Lueders	Porsche 911 GT3-RS	P	144
19	GT2	79	(Germany) JP Racing	(Germany) Jens Petersen (Germany) Oliver Mathai (Germany) Jan-Dirk Lueders	Porsche 3.6L Flat-6	P	144
20	GT2	98	(United Kingdom) James Watt Automotive	(United Kingdom) Paul Daniels (France) Thierry Stépec	Porsche 911 GT3-RS	D	141
20	GT2	98	(United Kingdom) James Watt Automotive	(United Kingdom) Paul Daniels (France) Thierry Stépec	Porsche 3.6L Flat-6	D	141
21	GT1	68	(Monaco) JMB Racing	(France) Antoine Gosse (Netherlands) Peter Kutemann (Netherlands) Hans Hugenholtz	Ferrari 575-GTC Maranello	P	138
21	GT1	68	(Monaco) JMB Racing	(France) Antoine Gosse (Netherlands) Peter Kutemann (Netherlands) Hans Hugenholtz	Ferrari 6.0L V12	P	138
22	LMP2	46	(Italy) Scuderia Villorba Corse	(Italy) Mauro Prospero (Italy) Denny Zardo	Lucchini SR2001	Y	132
22	LMP2	46	(Italy) Scuderia Villorba Corse	(Italy) Mauro Prospero (Italy) Denny Zardo	Alfa Romeo 3.0L V6	Y	132
23	GT2	89	(United Kingdom) Sebah Automotive	(Denmark) Lars-Erik Nielsen (Germany) Pierre Ehret (Denmark) Thorkild Thyrring	Porsche 911 GT3-RSR	D	131
23	GT2	89	(United Kingdom) Sebah Automotive	(Denmark) Lars-Erik Nielsen (Germany) Pierre Ehret (Denmark) Thorkild Thyrring	Porsche 3.6L Flat-6	D	131
24	GT1	53	(Germany) A-Level Engineering	(Germany) Wolfgang Kaufmann (Germany) Marcel Tiemann	Porsche 911 Bi-Turbo	MI	127
24	GT1	53	(Germany) A-Level Engineering	(Germany) Wolfgang Kaufmann (Germany) Marcel Tiemann	Porsche 3.6L Turbo Flat-6	MI	127
25 DNF	GT1	64	(Japan) JLOC (Germany) Reiter Engineering	(Netherlands) Peter Kox (Germany) Norman Simon	Lamborghini Murciélago R-GT	MI	133
25 DNF	GT1	64	(Japan) JLOC (Germany) Reiter Engineering	(Netherlands) Peter Kox (Germany) Norman Simon	Lamborghini 6.0L V12	MI	133
26 DNF	LMP2	30	(United Kingdom) Kruse Motorsport	(United Kingdom) Philipp Bennett (Netherlands) Michael Vergers (Denmark) Juan Barazi	Courage C65	P	122
26 DNF	LMP2	30	(United Kingdom) Kruse Motorsport	(United Kingdom) Philipp Bennett (Netherlands) Michael Vergers (Denmark) Juan Barazi	Judd XV675 3.4L V8	P	122
27 DNF	GT2	97	(United Kingdom) Tech9 Motorsport	(Thailand) Charoensukhawatana Nattavude (Thailand) Sontaya Kunplome (Thailand) Vutthikorn Inthraphuvasak	Porsche 911 GT3-RS	D	121
27 DNF	GT2	97	(United Kingdom) Tech9 Motorsport	(Thailand) Charoensukhawatana Nattavude (Thailand) Sontaya Kunplome (Thailand) Vutthikorn Inthraphuvasak	Porsche 3.6L Flat-6	D	121
28 DNF	GT1	57	(France) Paul Belmondo Racing	(France) Jean-Michel Papolla (France) Romain Iannetta (France) Didier Sommereau	Chrysler Viper GTS-R	MI	116
28 DNF	GT1	57	(France) Paul Belmondo Racing	(France) Jean-Michel Papolla (France) Romain Iannetta (France) Didier Sommereau	Chrysler 8.0L V8	MI	116
29 DNF	GT2	76	(Italy) Autorlando Sport	(Germany) Mike Rockenfeller (Italy) Franco Groppi (Italy) Luigi Moccia	Porsche 911 GT3-RSR	P	94
29 DNF	GT2	76	(Italy) Autorlando Sport	(Germany) Mike Rockenfeller (Italy) Franco Groppi (Italy) Luigi Moccia	Porsche 3.6L Flat-6	P	94
30 DNF	GT1	63	(Japan) JLOC	(Italy) Marco Apicella (Japan) Koji Yamanishi (Japan) Hisashi Wada	Lamborghini Murciélago R-GT	MI	85
30 DNF	GT1	63	(Japan) JLOC	(Italy) Marco Apicella (Japan) Koji Yamanishi (Japan) Hisashi Wada	Lamborghini 6.0L V12	MI	85
31 DNF	GT2	88	(United Kingdom) Gruppe M Racing	(United Kingdom) Jonathan Cocker (United Kingdom) Tim Sugden	Porsche 911 GT3-R	P	82
31 DNF	GT2	88	(United Kingdom) Gruppe M Racing	(United Kingdom) Jonathan Cocker (United Kingdom) Tim Sugden	Porsche 3.6L Flat-6	P	82
32 DNF	LMP2	31	(France) Noël del Bello Racing	(France) Christophe Tinseau (Portugal) Ni Amorim (France) Bastien Brière	Courage C65	MI	75
32 DNF	LMP2	31	(France) Noël del Bello Racing	(France) Christophe Tinseau (Portugal) Ni Amorim (France) Bastien Brière	Mecachrome 3.4L V8	MI	75
33 DNF	LMP2	27	(Switzerland) Horag Lista Racing	(Belgium) Didier Theys (Switzerland) Fredy Lienhard	Lola B05/40	MI	63
33 DNF	LMP2	27	(Switzerland) Horag Lista Racing	(Belgium) Didier Theys (Switzerland) Fredy Lienhard	Judd XV675 3.4L V8	MI	63
34 DNF	LMP2	45	(Italy) Lucchini Engineering	(Italy) Piergiuseppe Peroni (Italy) Mirko Savoldi	Lucchini LMP2/04	D	61
34 DNF	LMP2	45	(Italy) Lucchini Engineering	(Italy) Piergiuseppe Peroni (Italy) Mirko Savoldi	Judd XV675 3.4L V8	D	61
35 DNF	LMP2	28	(Italy) Ranieri Randaccio	(Italy) Ranieri Randaccio (Italy) Fabio Mancini	Tampolli SR2	D	56
35 DNF	LMP2	28	(Italy) Ranieri Randaccio	(Italy) Ranieri Randaccio (Italy) Fabio Mancini	Nicholson-McLaren 3.3L V8	D	56
36 DNF	GT1	56	(France) Paul Belmondo Racing	(France) Pierre Perret (Switzerland) Benjamin Leuenberger (Switzerland) Karim Ajlani	Chrysler Viper GTS-R	MI	53
36 DNF	GT1	56	(France) Paul Belmondo Racing	(France) Pierre Perret (Switzerland) Benjamin Leuenberger (Switzerland) Karim Ajlani	Chrysler 8.0L V10	MI	53
37 DNF	LMP2	20	(France) Pir Competition	(France) Pierre Bruneau (France) Marc Rostan (France) Jean-Philippe Peugeot	Pilbeam MP93	MI	45
37 DNF	LMP2	20	(France) Pir Competition	(France) Pierre Bruneau (France) Marc Rostan (France) Jean-Philippe Peugeot	JPX (Mader) 3.4L V6	MI	45
38 DNF	GT2	86	(Hong Kong) Noble Group (United Kingdom) Gruppe M Racing	(Hong Kong) Darryl O'Young (United Kingdom) Matthew Marsh	Porsche 911 GT3-RSR	P	45
38 DNF	GT2	86	(Hong Kong) Noble Group (United Kingdom) Gruppe M Racing	(Hong Kong) Darryl O'Young (United Kingdom) Matthew Marsh	Porsche 3.6L Flat-6	P	45
39 DNF	GT2	81	(United Kingdom) Team LNT	(United Kingdom) Jonny Kane (United Kingdom) Warren Hughes	TVR Tuscan T400R	D	26
39 DNF	GT2	81	(United Kingdom) Team LNT	(United Kingdom) Jonny Kane (United Kingdom) Warren Hughes	TVR Speed Six 4.0L I6	D	26
40 DNF	LMP1	5	(Italy) GP Racing	(Italy) Alex Caffi (Italy) Michele Serafini (Italy) Leonardo Maddalena	Promec PJ119	Y	25
40 DNF	LMP1	5	(Italy) GP Racing	(Italy) Alex Caffi (Italy) Michele Serafini (Italy) Leonardo Maddalena	Judd GV4 4.0L V10	Y	25
41 DNF	LMP2	37	(France) Paul Belmondo Racing	(France) Paul Belmondo (France) Didier André	Courage C65	MI	21
41 DNF	LMP2	37	(France) Paul Belmondo Racing	(France) Paul Belmondo (France) Didier André	Ford (AER) 2.0L Turbo I4	MI	21
42 DNF	GT2	99	(Italy) G.P.C. Sport	(Italy) Gabrio Rosa (Italy) Luca Drudi (Italy) Fabio Babini	Ferrari 360 Modena GTC	P	20
42 DNF	GT2	99	(Italy) G.P.C. Sport	(Italy) Gabrio Rosa (Italy) Luca Drudi (Italy) Fabio Babini	Ferrari 3.6L V8	P	20
43 DNF	LMP2	41	(United States) Binnie Motorsports	(United States) William Binnie (United Kingdom) Adam Sharpe (Canada) Robert Julien	Lola B05/40	P	7
43 DNF	LMP2	41	(United States) Binnie Motorsports	(United States) William Binnie (United Kingdom) Adam Sharpe (Canada) Robert Julien	Nicholson-McLaren 3.3L V8	P	7
DNS	GT2	82	(United Kingdom) Team LNT	(United Kingdom) Marc Hynes (United Kingdom) Patrick Pearce (United Kingdom) Lawrence Tomlinson	TVR Tuscan T400R	D	-
DNS	GT2	82	(United Kingdom) Team LNT	(United Kingdom) Marc Hynes (United Kingdom) Patrick Pearce (United Kingdom) Lawrence Tomlinson	TVR Speed Six 4.0L I6	D	-

== Statistics ==
- Pole Position - #15 Zytek Motorsport - 1:47.744
- Fastest Lap - #15 Zytek Motorsport - 1:39.437
- Average Speed - 198.756 km/h

Le Mans Series
Previous race: 2005 1000km of Spa	2005 season	Next race: 2005 1000km of Silverstone
