= Jean-Luc Maury-Laribière =

French racing driver (born 1943)

- Nationality: French
- Born: 22 February 1943 (age 83)
24 Hours of Le Mans career
- Years: 1993–2004
- Teams: BBA Compétition, Haberthur Racing, Noël del Bello Racing
- Best finish: 13th (1995)
- Class wins: –

Jean-Luc Maury-Laribière (born 22 February 1943) is a French racing driver.
