= Lola B05/40 =

Automotive

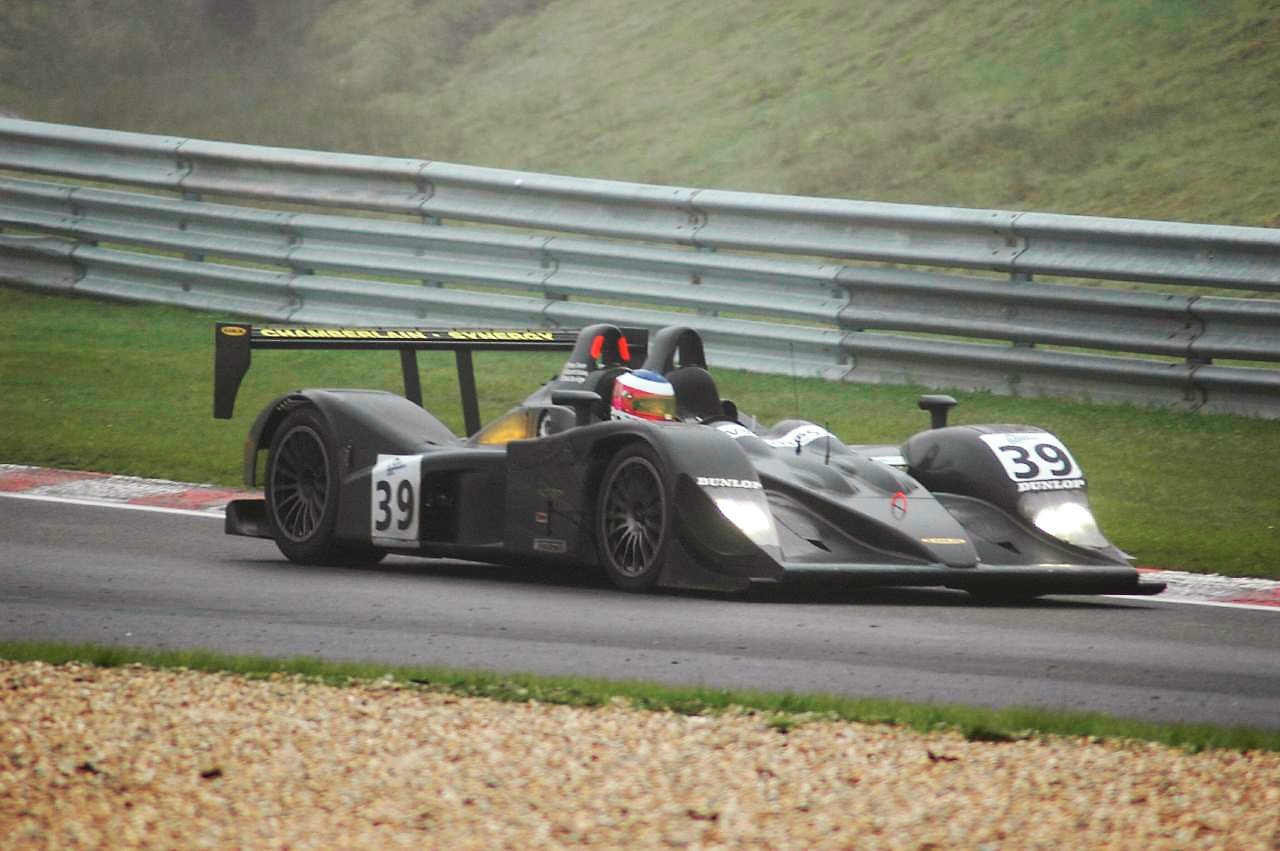
A Lola B05/40.

The Lola B05/40 is a Le Mans Prototype built by Lola Cars International for use in the LMP2 class for the American Le Mans Series, Le Mans Series, and 24 Hours of Le Mans. Developed in 2005, it was intended as a replacement for both the Lola B2K/40 and the MG-Lola EX257. It shares various structural elements with the larger LMP1-class Lola B06/10.

== Development ==
Following a change to Le Mans regulations by the Automobile Club de l'Ouest (ACO), which saw the LMP900 and LMP675 classes eliminated in order to make way for the newer LMP1 and LMP2 classes, many teams found that their old chassis would no longer be legal when the new regulations came into full effect in 2007. Lola's older chassis would be among those deemed illegal, requiring them to develop an all new car to meet the new LMP2 regulations.

The B05/40 can be seen as an evolution of the MG-Lola EX257 (also known as Lola B01/60), in that many mechanical and aerodynamic elements are shared between the two cars. While the front fenders appear similar in shape, there are major dimensional differences between the two cars (1000 mm over hang vs. 810 mm) such that the B05/40's fenders are bespoke to the car. The nose is raised in a fashion similar to the EX257 while lacking the opening grill at the tip. This opening is instead replaced by two large NACA ducts placed on either side of the nose. Behind the cockpit, now mandated twin rollover hoops replace the single roll hoop which originally sat behind just the driver. The air intake for the engine is placed in a nacelle between these rollover hoops, while turbocharged cars use a large duct placed to the left side of the cockpit.

Various engines have been used in the B05/40, with no standard engine being used when designing the chassis. The B05/40 was designed to accept a wide variety due to its use as a customer chassis for privateers. Engines used included Nicholson-McLaren V8s, Judd V8s, Zytek V8s, Acura V8s, AER turbocharged Inline-4s and Mazda turbocharged Inline-4s.

=== Modifications ===
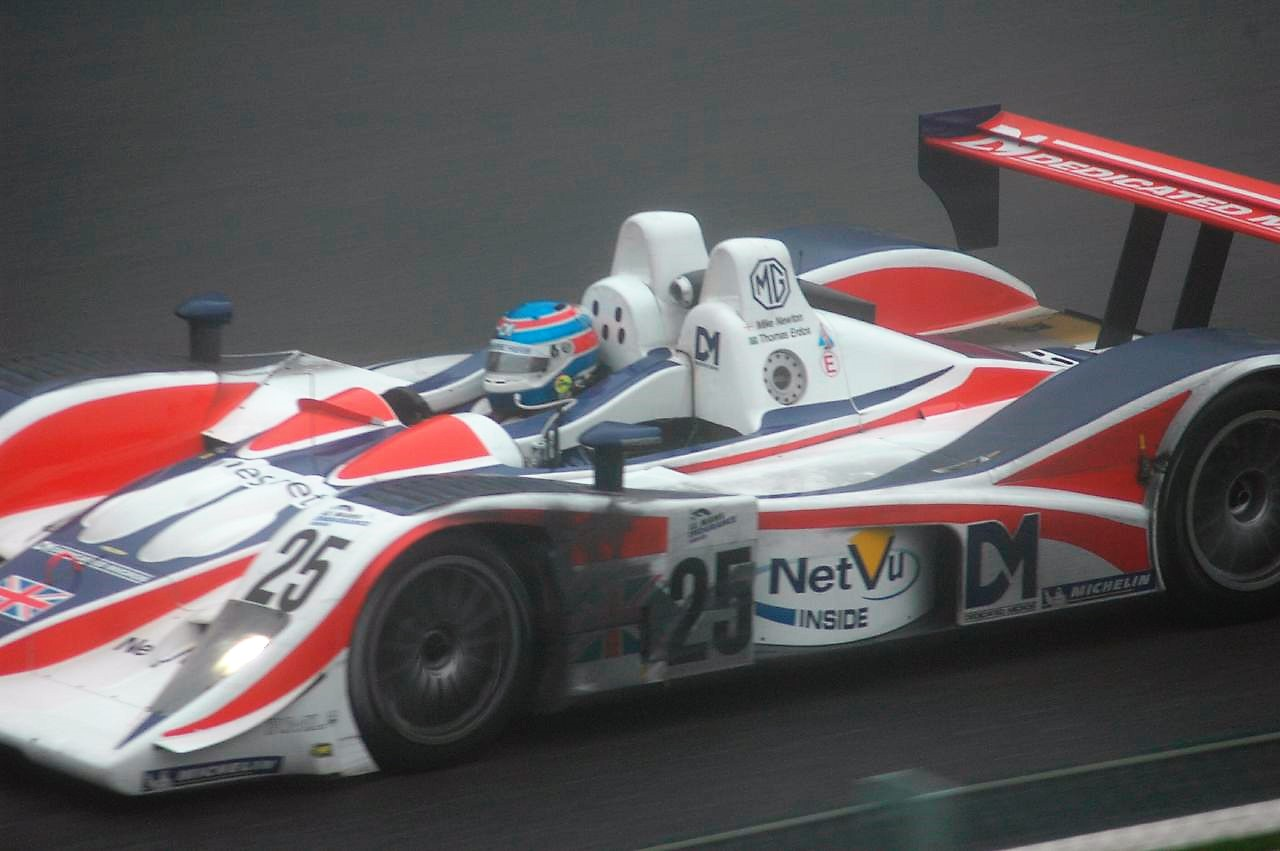
The Ray Mallock Ltd. MG-Lola EX264.

Since 2005, Lola continually upgraded the B05/40, including various bodywork upgrades for improved aerodynamics. In late 2006, a new chassis for Fernández Racing's Acura team was built which included slight upgrades, leading to Lola terming the car B06/40. However, for the beginning of the 2007 season, Lola unveiled further upgrades that were used by nearly all B05/40 customers. These upgrades included a redesigned front end, which replaced the NACA ducts with a single opening in the nose. Although all chassis have been upgraded, the naming of each car varies depending on the team, with B05/40, B06/40 and B07/40 all being used.

Another modified B05/40 was used by Ray Mallock Ltd. While called a MG EX264, this car is effectively 90% B05/40. It was later upgraded to include the 2007 bodywork, while retaining the EX264 name.

== Racing history ==
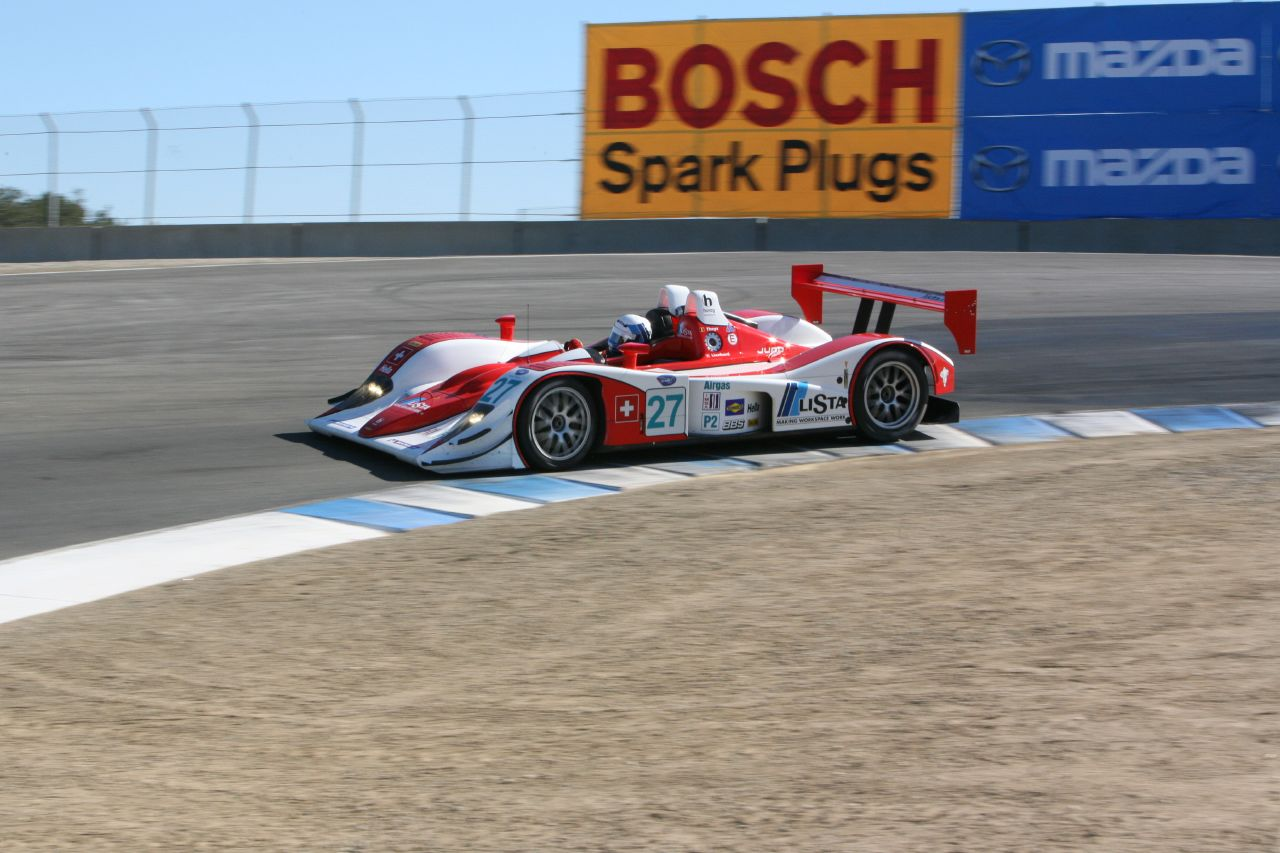
The Horag Racing B05/40.

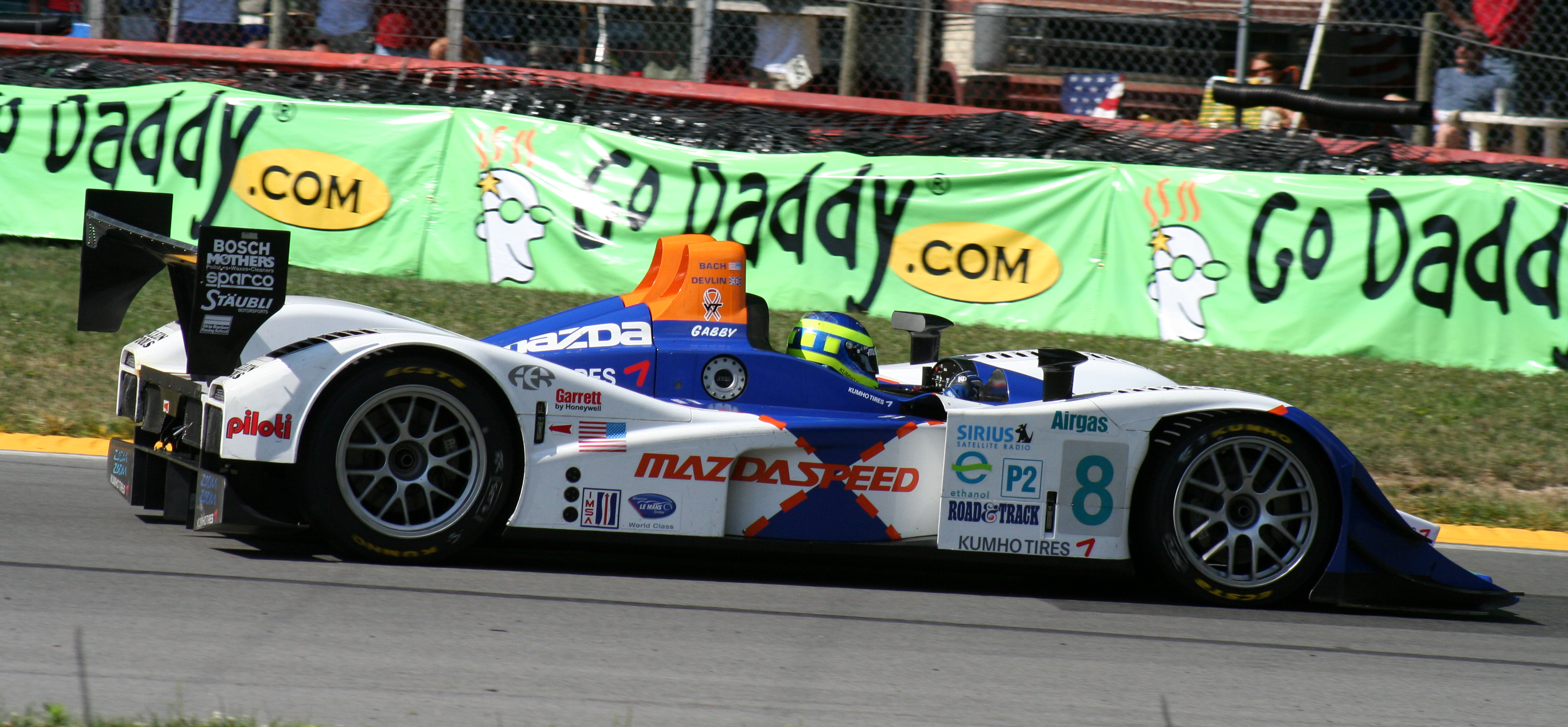
A Mazda-powered 2007-spec B07/46, based on the B05/40.

For their initial season in 2005, one B05/40 would be used by Intersport Racing in the American Le Mans Series season, while Chamberlain-Synergy Motorsport, Lista Racing, Ray Mallock Ltd. and Binnie Motorsports competed in the Le Mans Endurance Series. In the ALMS, Intersport would easily take the LMP2 championship with five victories over the season. Meanwhile, in the LMES, Chamberlain-Synergy would take the LMP2 championship, while Ray Mallock would take second and Horag fourth, with each of the three teams managing one win over the season. In the middle of the season, at the 24 Hours of Le Mans, Intersport would join Ray Mallock and Chamberlain-Synergy for the endurance event, with Ray Mallock taking the LMP2 victory.

Going into 2006, all of the B05/40 teams would remain, although Chamberlain-Synergy's team would be taken over by ASM Team Racing for Portugal midway through the Le Mans Series season. For Intersport, the American Le Mans Series LMP2 championship could not be retained due to new competition from the Porsche RS Spyder, even though Intersport scored three wins. A similar situation would occur in the LMS, with Barazi-Epsilon's Courage Competition outdoing the Ray Mallock EX264, which had one win. Although Chamberlain Synergy's chassis scored three wins during the season, their take over by ASM Team Racing for Portugal meant that the team's points were split, denying them the championship. For the 24 Hours of Le Mans, Ray Mallock would again take the LMP2 victory, with Intersport, Binnie and Chamberlain-Synergy also participating.

For the 2007 season, Intersport would move to the LMP1 class with a new chassis, while Fernández Racing would join the series with an upgraded B05/40 for use with the Acura Le Mans project. B-K Motorsports would also purchase a new B05/40 for use with their Mazda project, switching from a previous Courage chassis. Ray Mallock, Horag, Binnie and ASM Team Racing for Portugal would all remain in the Le Mans Series, all running with the 2007 upgrades.
