= 2021 Masters Endurance Legends =

The 2021 Masters Endurance Legends was the fourth season of the Masters Endurance Legends. It began at Donington Park on 2 April and ended at Algarve International Circuit on 31 October.

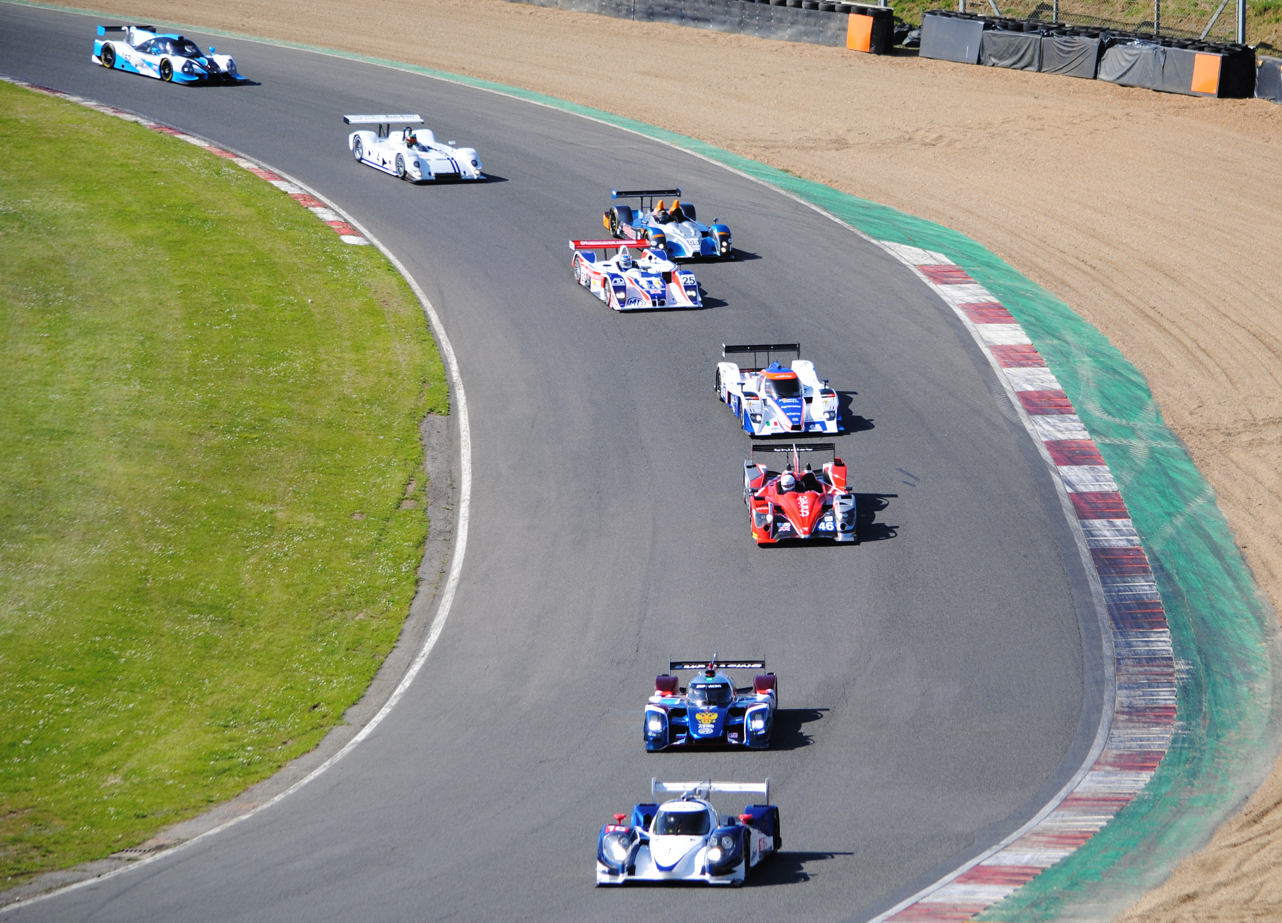
The start of race one at Brands Hatch.

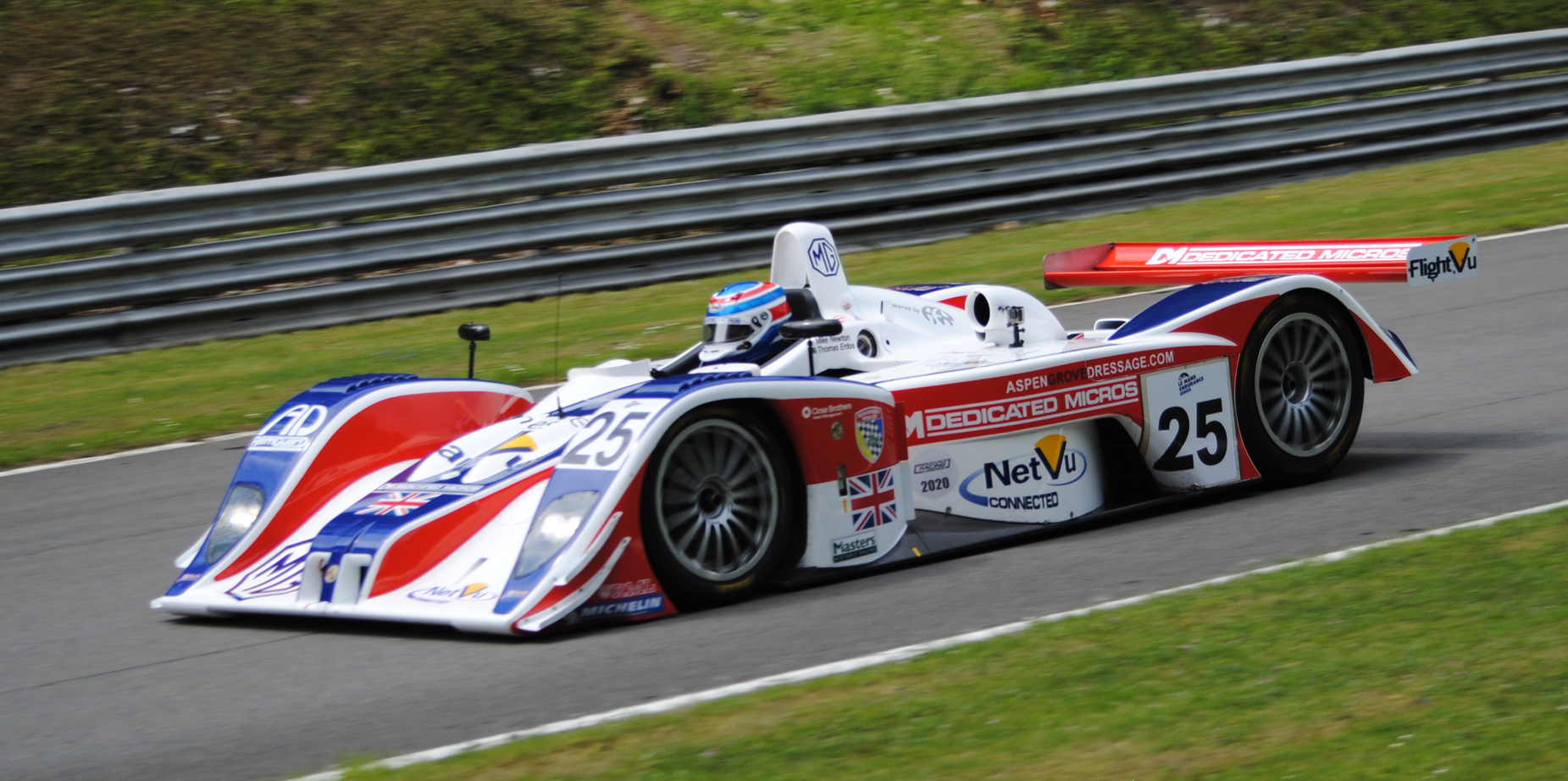
Mike Newton, championship leader of the G1/P2 class.

== Cars and Drivers ==
Team	Chassis	Engine	No.	Driver	Class	Rounds	Notes
Group 1
(United Kingdom) CGA Race Engineering	Lola-Aston Martin B09/60	Aston Martin 6.0 L V12	008	(Belgium) Christophe d'Ansembourg	P1	3, 5–7	
(United Kingdom) CGA Race Engineering	Dallara SP1	Judd GV4 5.0 L V10	17	(Belgium) Antoine d'Ansembourg	P1	5	
(United Kingdom) CGA Race Engineering	Dallara SP1	Judd GV4 5.0 L V10	27	(United Kingdom) Matthew Wrigley	P1	4	Ex-Doran Lista Racing
(United Kingdom) Scott Sport	Mosler MT900R GT3	Chevrolet LS1 5.7 L V8	2	(United Kingdom) Michael McInerney	GT2	1, 3–5	Ex-Eclipse Motorsport
(United Kingdom) Scott Sport	Mosler MT900R GT3	Chevrolet LS1 5.7 L V8	2	(United Kingdom) Aaron Scott	GT2	1, 3–5	Ex-Eclipse Motorsport
(United Kingdom) Scott Sport	Mosler MT900R GT3	Chevrolet LS1 5.7 L V8	124	(United Kingdom) Colin Paton	GT2	2, 4	Ex-Perspective Racing
(United Kingdom) Scott Sport	Mosler MT900R GT3	Chevrolet LS1 5.7 L V8	124	(United Kingdom) Fergus Paton	GT2	2	Ex-Perspective Racing
(United Kingdom) Scott Sport	Riley and Scott Mk III C	Lincoln (Élan) 6.0 L V8	4	(France) Xavier Micheron	P1	3, 5, 7	Ex-Intersport Racing
(United Kingdom) Scott Sport	Ferrari F430 GT2	Ferrari 4.0 L V8	11	(United Kingdom) James Thorpe	GT2	3, 5	
(United Kingdom) Scott Sport	Ferrari F430 GT2	Ferrari 4.0 L V8	11	(United Kingdom) Phil Quaife	GT2	3, 5	
(United Kingdom) Scott Sport	Zytek 09S	Zytek 4.5 L V8	20	(Canada) Keith Freiser	P1	4–7	Ex-Quifel - ASM Team
(United Kingdom) Scott Sport	Aston Martin DBR9	Aston Martin 6.0 L V12	123	(United States) Robert Blain	GT1	7	
(United Kingdom) Paul Cope	Reynard ProTran RS06	Judd GV5 S2 5.0 L V10	3	(United Kingdom) Paul Cope	P2	4	
(United Kingdom) Pursuit Racing	Riley and Scott Mk III C	Lincoln (Élan) 6.0 L V8	4	(United Kingdom) Richard Cook	P1	1–2	Ex-Jim Matthews, Riley & Scott Racing
(United Kingdom) Pursuit Racing	Riley and Scott Mk III C	Lincoln (Élan) 6.0 L V8	4	(United Kingdom) Ollie Hancock	P1	1	Ex-Jim Matthews, Riley & Scott Racing
(Monaco) JMB Classic	Saleen S7R	Ford 7.0 L V8	5	(France) Olivier Tancogne	GT1	4	
(Monaco) JMB Classic	Porsche RS Spyder	Porsche MR6 3.4 L V8	34	(France) Emmanuel Collard	P2	4	Ex-Van Merksteijn Motorsport
(Monaco) JMB Classic	Chrysler Viper GTS-R	Chrysler 356-T6 8.0 L V10	192	(France) Olivier Tancogne	GT1	3	
(United Kingdom) BBM Sport	Peugeot 908 HDi FAP	Peugeot HDi 5.5 L Turbo V12	7	(France) François Perrodo	P1	4	
(United Kingdom) BBM Sport	Peugeot 908 HDi FAP	Peugeot HDi 5.5 L Turbo V12	7	(United Kingdom) Shaun Lynn	P1	5	
(United Kingdom) BBM Sport	Peugeot 908 HDi FAP	Peugeot HDi 5.5 L Turbo V12	9	(United Kingdom) Shaun Lynn	P1	4	
(United Kingdom) Rollcentre Racing	Dallara SP1	Judd GV4 4.0 L V10	15	(United Kingdom) James Cottingham	P1	1, 4	Ex-PlayStation Team Oreca
(United Kingdom) Rollcentre Racing	Dallara SP1	Judd GV4 4.0 L V10	15	(United Kingdom) Max Girardo	P1	1, 4	Ex-PlayStation Team Oreca
(United Kingdom) John Danby Racing	Lola B2K/40	Nissan 3.6 L V6	23	(United Kingdom) Simon Watts	P2	1–2	Ex-Roock-Knight Hawk
(United Kingdom) Damax	Courage LC75	AER P07 2.0 L Turbo I4	24	(United Kingdom) Mike Furness	P2	All	Ex-Noël del Bello Racing
(United Kingdom) Damax	Courage LC75	AER P07 2.0 L Turbo I4	24	(United Kingdom) Robin Ward	P2	4	Ex-Noël del Bello Racing
(United Kingdom) MJ Tech	MG-Lola EX257	MG (AER) XP20 2.0 L Turbo I4	25	(United Kingdom) Mike Newton	P2	1–2, 4, 7	Ex-RML
(United Kingdom) Race Works	Porsche 911 GT3-RS	Porsche 3.6 L Flat-6	31	(United Kingdom) Andrew Lawley	GT2	1	
(Switzerland) Race Performance	Lola B07/18	Judd 5.0 L Turbo V12	37	(Switzerland) Marcello Marateotto	P1	3	
(France) Frédéric Rouvier	Luchinni SR2	Alfa Romeo 3.0 L V6	44	(France) Frédéric Rouvier	P2	3	
(United Kingdom) Moto Historics	Aston Martin DBR9	Aston Martin 6.0 L V12	53	(United Kingdom) Richard Meins	GT1	2, 7	Vitaphone Racing livery, ex-Strakka Racing
(United Kingdom) Clive Robinson	Ford Mustang GTS-1 (TA)	Ford 5.0 L V8	65	(United Kingdom) Oliver Bryant	GT1	1, 4	Marlboro livery
(United Kingdom) Simpson Motorsport	Lola B08/80	Judd DB 3.4 L V8	65	(United Kingdom) David Brise	P2	2	Ex-Racing Box
(United Kingdom) Simpson Motorsport	Lola B08/80	Judd DB 3.4 L V8	65	(United Kingdom) Alan Purbrick	P2	2	Ex-Racing Box
(United Kingdom) Simpson Motorsport	Lola B08/80	Judd DB 3.4 L V8	165	(United Kingdom) David Brise	P2	4–5	Ex-Racing Box
(United Kingdom) Simpson Motorsport	Lola B08/80	Judd DB 3.4 L V8	165	(United Kingdom) Alan Purbrick	P2	4–5	Ex-Racing Box
(United Kingdom) Care Racing Development	Ferrari 550-GTS Maranello	Ferrari F133 5.9 L V12	66	(Germany) Dominik Roschmann	GT1	3	Ex-Prodrive
(United Kingdom) BS Motorsport	Porsche 911 GT3-RS	Porsche 3.6 L Flat-6	69	(United Kingdom) Nigel Greensall	GT2	4	
(United Kingdom) BS Motorsport	Porsche 911 GT3-RS	Porsche 3.6 L Flat-6	69	(United Kingdom) Paul Phillips	GT2	4	
(United Kingdom) Track Club	Porsche 996 RSR	Porsche 3.6 L Flat-6	70	(United Kingdom) Marcus Jewell	GT2	1–2, 4–5	
(United Kingdom) Track Club	Porsche 996 RSR	Porsche 3.6 L Flat-6	70	(United Kingdom) Ben Clucas	GT2	2 (R1), 4–5	
(United Kingdom) Kendall Development	Morgan Aero 8 GTN	BMW 4.6 L V8	73	(United Kingdom) Steve Hyde	GT2	3	Ex-DeWalt-Racesport Salisbury
(United Kingdom) Mirage Engineering	Chevrolet Corvette C6.R	Chevrolet 7.0 L V8	77	(United Kingdom) David Methley	GT1	4	
(United Kingdom) Sporting & Historic Car Engineers	Aston Martin DBR9	Aston Martin 6.0 L V12	90	(Germany) Nikolaus Ditting	GT1	3 (R2)	
(France) Auto Pouchelon	Chrysler Viper GTS-R	Chrysler 356-T6 8.0 L V10	92	(France) Ghislain Gaubert	GT1	3	
(France) Auto Pouchelon	Chrysler Viper GTS-R	Chrysler 356-T6 8.0 L V10	92	(France) Gaubert Guillaume	GT1	3	
(France) Philippe Raffin	Ferrari F430 Challenge	Ferrari 4.3 L V8	255	(France) Philippe Raffin	GT3	3	
Group 2
(Germany) Britec Motorsport	Aston Martin V12 Vantage GT3	Aston Martin 6.0 L V12	007	(United Kingdom) Nick Padmore	GT3	3	
(Germany) Britec Motorsport	Aston Martin V12 Vantage GT3	Aston Martin 6.0 L V12	007	(Germany) Oliver Mathai	GT3	5	
(Germany) Britec Motorsport	Lola B12/80	Lotus (Judd) 3.6 L V8	31	(Germany) Marco Werner	P2	3, 5–7	Ex-Kodewa
(Germany) Britec Motorsport	Lola B12/80	Lotus (Judd) 3.6 L V8	31	(Germany) Georg Hallau	P2	3, 5	Ex-Kodewa
(Germany) Britec Motorsport	Lola B12/80	Lotus (Judd) 3.6 L V8	31	(United Kingdom) Nick Padmore	P2	6–7	Ex-Kodewa
(Germany) Britec Motorsport	Ferrari 458 Italia GT3	Ferrari 4.5 L V8	51	(United Kingdom) Nick Padmore	GT3	5	
(Germany) Britec Motorsport	Ferrari 458 Italia GT3	Ferrari 4.5 L V8	51	(Germany) Christopher Stahl	GT3	5	
(Germany) Britec Motorsport	McLaren MP4-12 GT3	McLaren 3.8 L V8	147	(Switzerland) Felix Haas	GT3	5	
(United Kingdom) Wolfe Engineering	Ferrari 458 Italia GT3	Ferrari 4.5 L V8	3	(Switzerland) Michael Gans	GT3	3 (R1)	Ex-Rosso Verde
(United Kingdom) Wolfe Engineering	Ferrari 458 Italia GT3	Ferrari 4.5 L V8	3	(United States) Jason Wright	GT3	3 (R2), 5–7	Ex-Rosso Verde
(Monaco) JMB Classic	Ferrari 458 GTE	Ferrari 4.5 L V8	5	(France) Xavier Tancogne	GT2	3	Ex-AF Corse
(Monaco) JMB Classic	Ferrari 458 GTE	Ferrari 4.5 L V8	55	(France) Xavier Tancogne	GT2	4	Ex-AF Corse
(United Kingdom) BBM Sport	BR 01	Nissan VK45DE 4.5 L V8	5	(Portugal) Rui Águas	P2	5	Ex-SMP Racing
(United Kingdom) BBM Sport	BR 01	Nissan VK45DE 4.5 L V8	27	(United Kingdom) Shaun Lynn	P2	1–3	Ex-SMP Racing
(United Kingdom) BBM Sport	BR 01	Nissan VK45DE 4.5 L V8	36	(United Kingdom) Maxwell Lynn	P2	1, 4–5	Ex-SMP Racing
(United Kingdom) BBM Sport	BR 01	Nissan VK45DE 4.5 L V8	45	(United Kingdom) Jack Dex	P2	1	Ex-SMP Racing
(United Kingdom) BBM Sport	BR 01	Nissan VK45DE 4.5 L V8	47	(United Kingdom) Richard Meins	P2	1	Ex-SMP Racing
(United Kingdom) BBM Sport	BR 01	Nissan VK45DE 4.5 L V8	47	(United Kingdom) Chris Perkins	P2	4–5	Ex-SMP Racing
(United Kingdom) BBM Sport	BR 01	Nissan VK45DE 4.5 L V8	47	(United Kingdom) Jason McInulty	P2	4	Ex-SMP Racing
(United Kingdom) BBM Sport	Peugeot 90X	Peugeot HDi 5.5 L Turbo V12	8	(Greece) Kriton Lendoudis	P1	3, 5	
(United Kingdom) Mirage Engineering	Oreca FLM09	Chevrolet LS3 6.2 L V8	8	(United Kingdom) Chris Atkinson	P3	2, 6–7	
(United Kingdom) Mirage Engineering	Oreca FLM09	Chevrolet LS3 6.2 L V8	8	(United Kingdom) Gregory Thornton	P3	2	
(United Kingdom) Mirage Engineering	Oreca FLM09	Chevrolet LS3 6.2 L V8	8	(United Kingdom) James Hagan	P3	6–7	
(United Kingdom) Mirage Engineering	Oreca FLM09	Chevrolet LS3 6.2 L V8	18	(United Kingdom) Chris Atkinson	P3	4	
(United Kingdom) SVP Motorsport	Porsche 997 RSR	Porsche 4.0 L Flat-6	10	(United Kingdom) John Cockerton	GT2	1, 4	
(United Kingdom) SVP Motorsport	Porsche 997 RSR	Porsche 4.0 L Flat-6	10	(United Kingdom) Tom Jackson	GT2	1, 4	
(United Kingdom) PCA Ltd	Lola B12/60	Mazda MZR-R 2.0 L Turbo I4	16	(United Kingdom) Steve Tandy	P1	1–2, 5	Ex-Dyson Racing
(United Kingdom) PCA Ltd	Lola B12/60	Mazda MZR-R 2.0 L Turbo I4	116	(United Kingdom) Steve Tandy	P1	4 (R2)	Ex-Dyson Racing
(United Kingdom) PCA Ltd	Lola B12/60	Mazda MZR-R 2.0 L Turbo I4	116	(United Kingdom) Rob Wheldon	P1	4 (R1)	Ex-Dyson Racing
(United Kingdom) Greaves Motorsport	Gibson 015S	Nissan VK45DE 4.5 L V8	41	(United Kingdom) James Littlejohn	P2	4	
(United Kingdom) Nine-W Race Engineering	Oreca 03	Nissan VK45DE 4.5 L V8	46	(United Kingdom) Mark Higson	P2	2	Ex-Thiriet by TDS Racing
(United Kingdom) Nine-W Race Engineering	Oreca 03	Nissan VK45DE 4.5 L V8	46	(United Kingdom) Mark Higson	P3	4	Ex-Thiriet by TDS Racing
(United Kingdom) Nine-W Race Engineering	Oreca FLM09	Chevrolet LS3 6.2 L V8	46	(United Kingdom) Mark Higson	P3	7	
(United Kingdom) Damax	Ligier JS P3	Nissan VK50DE 5.0 L V8	52	(United Kingdom) Craig Davies	P3	2–7	
(United Kingdom) Damax	Ligier JS P3	Nissan VK50DE 5.0 L V8	52	(United Kingdom) Ron Maydon	P3	2–7	
(Switzerland) TFT Racing	Oreca 03	Nissan VK45DE 4.5 L V8	74	(France) Philippe Papin	P2	3	Ex-Sébastien Loeb Racing
(Switzerland) TFT Racing	Oreca 03	Nissan VK45DE 4.5 L V8	74	(France) Karl Pedraza	P2	3	Ex-Sébastien Loeb Racing
(Belgium) Street Art Racing	Aston Martin Vantage GT2	Aston Martin 4.5 L V8	79	(Belgium) Albert Bloem	GT2	5	
(United Kingdom) Sporting & Historic Car Engineers	Aston Martin DBR9	Aston Martin 6.0 L V12	90	(Germany) Nikolaus Ditting	GT1	3 (R1)	
(United Kingdom) CGA Race Engineering	Pescarolo 01	Judd GV5.5 S2 5.5 L V10	99	(United Kingdom) Jamie Constable	P1	4–5, 7	Ex-OAK Racing
(United Kingdom) Scott Sport	Aston Martin DBR9	Aston Martin 6.0 L V12	123	(United States) Robert Blain	GT1	6	
(United Kingdom) Superperformance	Ferrari 458 Italia GT3	Ferrari 4.5 L V8	126	(United Kingdom) Colin Sowter	GT3	1–2, 4	
(Germany) Classic & Speed	Audi R8 LMS Ultra	Audi 5.5 L V10	222	(Germany) Marcus von Oeynhausen-Sierstorpff	GT3	5	
Invitational
(United Kingdom) Peter Chambers	Porsche 962	Porsche 3.0 L Flat-6	6	(Austria) Lukas Halusa	4		Ex-Joest Racing
(France) Eric Martin	Debora SP91-01	Alfa Romeo 3.0 L V6	61	(France) Eric Martin	3		Ex-Didier Bonnet Racing
(France) Jean-Pascal Roche	Porsche 996 GT3 Cup	Porsche 3.6 L Flat-6	996	(France) Jean-Pascal Roche	3		

Icon	Class
P1	Prototype 1 Class
P2	Prototype 2 Class
P3	Prototype 3 Class
GT1	GT 1 Class
GT2	GT 2 Class
GT3	GT 3 Class

== Race results ==
Bold indicates overall winner.

Round		Event	Circuit	Date	Pole position	Fastest lap	G1 Class Winners	G2 Class Winners
1	R1	Masters Historic Race Weekend	(United Kingdom) Donington Park	2 April	(United Kingdom) Shaun Lynn	(United Kingdom) Steve Tandy	P1: (United Kingdom) Richard Cook; P1: (United Kingdom) Ollie Hancock; P2: (United Kingdom) Mike Newton; GT1: (United Kingdom) Oliver Bryant; GT2: (United Kingdom) Michael McInerney; GT2: (United Kingdom) Aaron Scott	P1: No finishers **P2: (United Kingdom) Jack Dex**; GT2: (United Kingdom) John Cockerton; GT2: (United Kingdom) Tom Jackson; GT3: (United Kingdom) Colin Sowter
1	R2	Masters Historic Race Weekend	(United Kingdom) Donington Park	3 April	(United Kingdom) Maxwell Lynn	(United Kingdom) Shaun Lynn	P1: (United Kingdom) Richard Cook; P1: (United Kingdom) Ollie Hancock; P2: (United Kingdom) Mike Newton; GT1: No finishers GT2: (United Kingdom) Marcus Jewell	**P1: (United Kingdom) Steve Tandy**; P2: (United Kingdom) Jack Dex; GT2: No finishers GT3: (United Kingdom) Colin Sowter
2	R3	Masters Historic Festival	(United Kingdom) Brands Hatch	29 May	(United Kingdom) Steve Tandy	(United Kingdom) Shaun Lynn	P1: (United Kingdom) Richard Cook; P2: (United Kingdom) Mike Newton; GT1: (United Kingdom) Richard Meins; GT2: (United Kingdom) Ben Clucas; GT2: (United Kingdom) Marcus Jewell	**P1: (United Kingdom) Steve Tandy**; P2: (United Kingdom) Shaun Lynn; P3: (United Kingdom) Craig Davies; P3: (United Kingdom) Ron Maydon; GT3: (United Kingdom) Colin Sowter
2	R4	Masters Historic Festival	(United Kingdom) Brands Hatch	30 May		(United Kingdom) Steve Tandy	P1: No finishers P2: (United Kingdom) Mike Newton; GT1: (United Kingdom) Richard Meins; GT2: (United Kingdom) Marcus Jewell	**P1: (United Kingdom) Steve Tandy**; P2: (United Kingdom) Shaun Lynn; P3: (United Kingdom) Craig Davies; P3: (United Kingdom) Ron Maydon; GT3: No starters
3	R5	Grand Prix de France Historique	(France) Circuit Paul Ricard	12 June	(Greece) Kriton Lendoudis	(Greece) Kriton Lendoudis	P1: (Belgium) Christophe d'Ansembourg; P2: No finishers GT1: (Germany) Dominik Roschmann; GT2: (United Kingdom) James Thorpe; GT2: (United Kingdom) Phil Quaife; GT3: No starters	**P1: (Greece) Kriton Lendoudis**; P2: (United Kingdom) Shaun Lynn; P3: (United Kingdom) Craig Davies; GT1: (Germany) Nikolaus Ditting; GT2: (France) Xavier Tancogne; GT3: (United Kingdom) Nick Padmore
3	R6	Grand Prix de France Historique	(France) Circuit Paul Ricard	13 June		(Belgium) Christophe d'Ansembourg	**P1: (Belgium) Christophe d'Ansembourg**; P2: No finishers GT1: (France) Olivier Tancogne; GT2: (United Kingdom) Steve Hyde; GT3: No starters	P1: (Greece) Kriton Lendoudis; P2: (United Kingdom) Shaun Lynn; P3: (United Kingdom) Ron Maydon; GT2: (France) Xavier Tancogne; GT3: (United Kingdom) Nick Padmore
4	R7	Silverstone Classic	(United Kingdom) Silverstone Circuit	31 July	(France) Emmanuel Collard	(United Kingdom) Rob Wheldon	P1: (France) François Perrodo; P2: (France) Emmanuel Collard; GT1: (United Kingdom) Oliver Bryant; GT2: (United Kingdom) Ben Clucas; GT2: (United Kingdom) Marcus Jewell	**P1: (United Kingdom) Rob Wheldon**; P2: (United Kingdom) Maxwell Lynn; P3: (United Kingdom) Chris Atkinson; GT2: (France) Xavier Tancogne; GT3: (United Kingdom) Colin Sowter
4	R8	Silverstone Classic	(United Kingdom) Silverstone Circuit	1 August		(France) Emmanuel Collard	**P1: (France) François Perrodo**; P2: (France) Emmanuel Collard; GT1: (France) Olivier Tancogne; GT2: (United Kingdom) Ben Clucas; GT2: (United Kingdom) Marcus Jewell	P1: (United Kingdom) Jamie Constable; P2: (United Kingdom) Maxwell Lynn; P3: (United Kingdom) Mark Higson; GT2: (France) Xavier Tancogne; GT3: (United Kingdom) Colin Sowter
5	R9	Spa Six Hours	(Belgium) Circuit de Spa-Francorchamps	2 October	(Belgium) Christophe d'Ansembourg	(United Kingdom) Shaun Lynn	**P1: (Belgium) Christophe d'Ansembourg**; P2: (United Kingdom) David Brise; P2: (United Kingdom) Alan Purbrick; GT2: (United Kingdom) Michael McInerney; GT2: (United Kingdom) Aaron Scott	P1: (United Kingdom) Jamie Constable; P2: (United Kingdom) Maxwell Lynn; P3: (United Kingdom) Craig Davies; P3: (United Kingdom) Ron Maydon; GT2: (Belgium) Albert Bloem; GT3: (Germany) Marcus v Oeynhausen-Sierstorpff
5	R10	Spa Six Hours	(Belgium) Circuit de Spa-Francorchamps	3 October		(Portugal) Rui Águas	**P1: (United Kingdom) Shaun Lynn**; P2: (United Kingdom) David Brise; P2: (United Kingdom) Alan Purbrick; GT2: (United Kingdom) Michael McInerney; GT2: (United Kingdom) Aaron Scott	P1: (United Kingdom) Jamie Constable; P2: (Portugal) Rui Águas; P3: (United Kingdom) Craig Davies; P3: (United Kingdom) Ron Maydon; GT2: No starters GT3: (Germany) Marcus v Oeynhausen-Sierstorpff
6	R11	Jerez Historic Festival	(Spain) Circuito de Jerez	22–24 October	(Belgium) Christophe d'Ansembourg	(Germany) Marco Werner (United Kingdom) Nick Padmore	**P1: (Belgium) Christophe d'Ansembourg**; P2: (United Kingdom) Mike Furness	P2: (Germany) Marco Werner; P2: (United Kingdom) Nick Padmore; P3: (United Kingdom) Chris Atkinson; P3: (United Kingdom) James Hagan; GT1: (United States) Robert Blain; GT3: (United Kingdom) Jason Wright
6	R12	Jerez Historic Festival	(Spain) Circuito de Jerez	22–24 October		(Germany) Marco Werner (United Kingdom) Nick Padmore	**P1: (Belgium) Christophe d'Ansembourg**; P2: (United Kingdom) Mike Furness	P2: (Germany) Marco Werner; P2: (United Kingdom) Nick Padmore; P3: (United Kingdom) Craig Davies; P3: (United Kingdom) Ron Maydon; GT1: (United States) Robert Blain; GT3: (United Kingdom) Jason Wright
7	R13	Algarve Classic Festival	(Portugal) Algarve International Circuit	29–31 October				
7	R14	Algarve Classic Festival	(Portugal) Algarve International Circuit	29–31 October				

== Championship Standings ==
Starters	Position	**1st**	**2nd**	**3rd**	**4th**	**5th**	**6th**
3+	Points	9	6	4	3	2	1
2	Points	6	4				
1	Points	4					

Pos.	Driver	No	Chassis	(United Kingdom) DON		(United Kingdom) BRH		(France) LEC		(United Kingdom) SIL		(Belgium) SPA		(Spain) JER		(Portugal) ALG	Points
G1/P1 Class
1	(Belgium) Christophe d'Ansembourg	008	Lola-Aston Martin B09/60					**2**	1			**12**	14	**1**	1		36
2	(United Kingdom) Shaun Lynn	8	Peugeot 908 HDi FAP							4	2	1	1				30
3	(Canada) Keith Freiser	30	Zytek 09S							7	Ret	8	Ret	2	3		20
4	(France) François Perrodo	7	Peugeot 908 HDi FAP							2	1						18
5	(France) Xavier Micheron	4	Riley and Scott MK III C					20	6			9	9				17
6	(United Kingdom) Richard Cook	4	Riley and Scott MK III C	**5**	**7**	**8**	Ret										14
7	(Switzerland) Marcello Marateotto	37	Lola B07/18					4	2								12
8	(United Kingdom) Ollie Hancock	4	Riley and Scott MK III C	**5**	**7**												10
9	(United Kingdom) James Cottingham (United Kingdom) Max Girardo	15	Dallara SP1	Ret	DNS					22	7						7
10	(Belgium) Antoine d'Ansembourg	17	Dallara SP1									5	Ret				6
11	(United Kingdom) Matthew Wrigley	27	Dallara SP1							**24**	Ret						2
G1/P2 Class
1	(United Kingdom) Mike Newton	25	MG-Lola EX257	**4**	**5**	3	3			Ret	12						37
2	(United Kingdom) Mike Furness	24	Courage LC75	9	8	11	6	Ret	Ret	12	13	DNS	Ret	**6**	8		34
3	(United Kingdom) David Brise (United Kingdom) Alan Purbrick	65	Lola B08/80			**6**	Ret										28
3	(United Kingdom) David Brise (United Kingdom) Alan Purbrick	165	Lola B08/80							11	9	**10**	6				28
4	(France) Emmanuel Collard	34	Porsche RS Spyder							**5**	4						18
5	(United Kingdom) Simon Watts	23	Lola B2K/40	12	DNS	10	DNS										8
6	(United Kingdom) Robin Ward	24	Courage LC75							12	13						7
7	(United Kingdom) Paul Cope	3	Reynard ProTran RS06							Ret	23						2
	(France) Frédéric Rouvier	44	Luchinni SR2					Ret	DNS								0
G1/GT1 Class
1	(France) Olivier Tancogne	192	Chrysler Viper GTS-R					10	8								30
1	(France) Olivier Tancogne	5	Saleen S7R							19	16						30
2	(United Kingdom) Oliver Bryant	65	Ford Mustang GTS-1 (TA)	**7**	**Ret**					**17**	25						19
3	(Germany) Dominik Roschmann	66	Ferrari 550-GTS Maranello					**8**	9								15
4	(United Kingdom) Richard Meins	53	Aston Martin DBR9			**7**	7										8
5	(France) Ghislain Gaubert (France) Gaubert Guillaume	92	Chrysler Viper GTS-R					16	15								7
6	(Germany) Nikolaus Ditting	90	Aston Martin DBR9						10								4
7	(United Kingdom) David Methley	77	Chevrolet Corvette C6.R							23	Ret						4
G1/GT2 Class
1	(United Kingdom) Michael McInerney (United Kingdom) Aaron Scott	2	Mosler MT900R GT3	9	**DNS**			15	17	16	19	15	11				51
2	(United Kingdom) Marcus Jewell	70	Porsche 996 RSR	**10**	8	**12**	8			**15**	18	17	16				48
3	(United Kingdom) Ben Clucas	70	Porsche 996 RSR		8	**12**	8			**15**	18	17	16				42
4	(United Kingdom) Phil Quaife (United Kingdom) James Thorpe	11	Ferrari F430 GT2					**13**	Ret			**16**	18				19
5	(United Kingdom) Steve Hyde	73	Morgan Aero 8 GTN					18	16								13
6	(United Kingdom) Colin Paton	124	Mosler MT900R GT3			Ret	DNS			21	22						8
7	(United Kingdom) Andrew Lawley	31	Porsche 911 GT3-RS	14	DNS												4
8	(United Kingdom) Nigel Greensall (United Kingdom) Paul Philips	69	Porsche 911 GT3-RS							26	Ret						3
	(United Kingdom) Fergus Paton	124	Mosler MT900R GT3			Ret	DNS										0
G1/GT3 Class
	(France) Philippe Raffin	255	Ferrari F430 Challenge					DNS	DNS								0
G2/P1 Class
1	(United Kingdom) Jamie Constable	99	Pescarolo 01							3	3	**3**	4				33
2	(Greece) Kriton Lendoudis	8	Peugeot 90X					**1**	4	6	5	4	Ret				24
3	(United Kingdom) Steve Tandy	16	Lola B12/60	**Ret**	**1**	**1**	1					7	Ret				16
3	(United Kingdom) Steve Tandy	116	Lola B12/60								Ret						16
4	(United Kingdom) Rob Wheldon	116	Lola B12/60							**1**							9
G2/P2 Class
1	(United Kingdom) Maxwell Lynn	36	BR 01	2	**3**					8	6	2	3				45
2	(United Kingdom) Shaun Lynn	27	BR 01	**3**	4	**2**	2	**3**	3								38
3	(Germany) Marco Werner	31	Lola B12/80					5	5			14	17	**3**	2		27
3	(Germany) Georg Hallau	31	Lola B12/80					5	5			14	17				27
3	(United Kingdom) Nick Padmore	31	Lola B12/80											**3**	2		27
4	(United Kingdom) Jack Dex	45	BR 01	1	2												18
5	(Portugal) Rui Águas	5	BR 01									6	2				15
6	(United Kingdom) Jason McInulty (United Kingdom) Chris Perkins	47	BR 01							9	10	Ret	10				14
7	(United Kingdom) Mark Higson	46	Oreca 03			5	4										8
8	(France) Philippe Papin (France) Karl Pedraza	74	Oreca 03					6	7								8
9	(United Kingdom) James Littlejohn	41	Gibson 015S							**NC**	8						6
10	(United Kingdom) Richard Meins	47	BR 01	6	6												6
G2/P3 Class
1	(United Kingdom) Ron Maydon	52	Ligier JS P3			4	5		12	**14**	17	**18**	7	5	4		40
2	(United Kingdom) Craig Davies	52	Ligier JS P3			4	5	**12**		**14**	17	**18**	12	5	4		40
3	(United Kingdom) Chris Atkinson	8	Oreca FLM09			Ret	DNS							4	5		22
3	(United Kingdom) Chris Atkinson	18	Oreca FLM09							13	15						22
4	(United Kingdom) James Hagan	8	Oreca FLM09											4	5		10
5	(United Kingdom) Mark Higson	46	Oreca 03							DNS	11						9
	(United Kingdom) Gregory Thornton	8	Oreca FLM09			Ret	DNS										0
G2/GT1 Class
1	(United States) Robert Blain	123	Aston Martin DBR9											**Ret**	6		4
2	(Germany) Nikolaus Ditting	90	Aston Martin DBR9					**7**									4
G2/GT2 Class
1	(France) Xavier Tancogne	5	Ferrari 458 GTE					**14**	**13**								20
1	(France) Xavier Tancogne	55	Ferrari 458 GTE							18	21						20
2	(United Kingdom) John Cockerton (United Kingdom) Tom Jackson	10	Porsche 997 RSR	**13**	**Ret**					**25**	24						12
3	(Belgium) Albert Bloem	79	Aston Martin Vantage GT2									**21**	DNS				4
G2/GT3 Class
1	(United States) Jason Wright	3	Ferrari 458 Italia GT3						14			19	12	**7**	7		20
2	(Germany) Marcus von Oeynhausen-Sierstorpff	222	Audi R8 LMS Ultra									**11**	5				18
3	(United Kingdom) Colin Sowter	126	Ferrari 458 Italia GT3	**11**	**9**	**9**	DNS			**20**	20						16
4	(United Kingdom) Nick Padmore	007	Aston Martin V12 Vantage GT3					**9**	11								12
5	(Germany) Oliver Mathai	007	Aston Martin V12 Vantage GT3									13	8				12
6	(United Kingdom) Nick Padmore (Germany) Christopher Stahl	51	Ferrari 458 Italia GT3									20	13				6
7	(Switzerland) Michael Gans	3	Ferrari 458 Italia GT3					11									4
8	(Switzerland) Felix Haas	147	McLaren MP4-12 GT3									22	15				4
Invitation class drivers ineligible for points
	(Austria) Lukas Halusa	6	Porsche 962							10	14						
	(France) Eric Martin	61	Debora SP91-01					17	Ret								
	(France) Jean-Pascal Roche	996	Porsche 996 GT3 Cup					19	18								
Pos.	Driver	No	Chassis	(United Kingdom) DON		(United Kingdom) BRH		(France) LEC		(United Kingdom) SIL		(Belgium) SPA		(Spain) JER		(Portugal) ALG	Points

Key
Colour	Result
Gold	Winner
Silver	Second place
Bronze	Third place
Green	Other points position
Blue	Other classified position
Blue	Not classified, finished (NC)
Purple	Not classified, retired (Ret)
Red	Did not qualify (DNQ)
Red	Did not pre-qualify (DNPQ)
Black	Disqualified (DSQ)
White	Did not start (DNS)
White	Race cancelled (C)
Blank	Did not practice (DNP)
Blank	Excluded (EX)
Blank	Did not arrive (DNA)
Blank	Withdrawn (WD)
Blank	Did not enter (cell empty)
Text formatting	Meaning
**Bold**	Pole position
Italics	Fastest lap
