= Craig Davies (racing driver) =

British racing driver

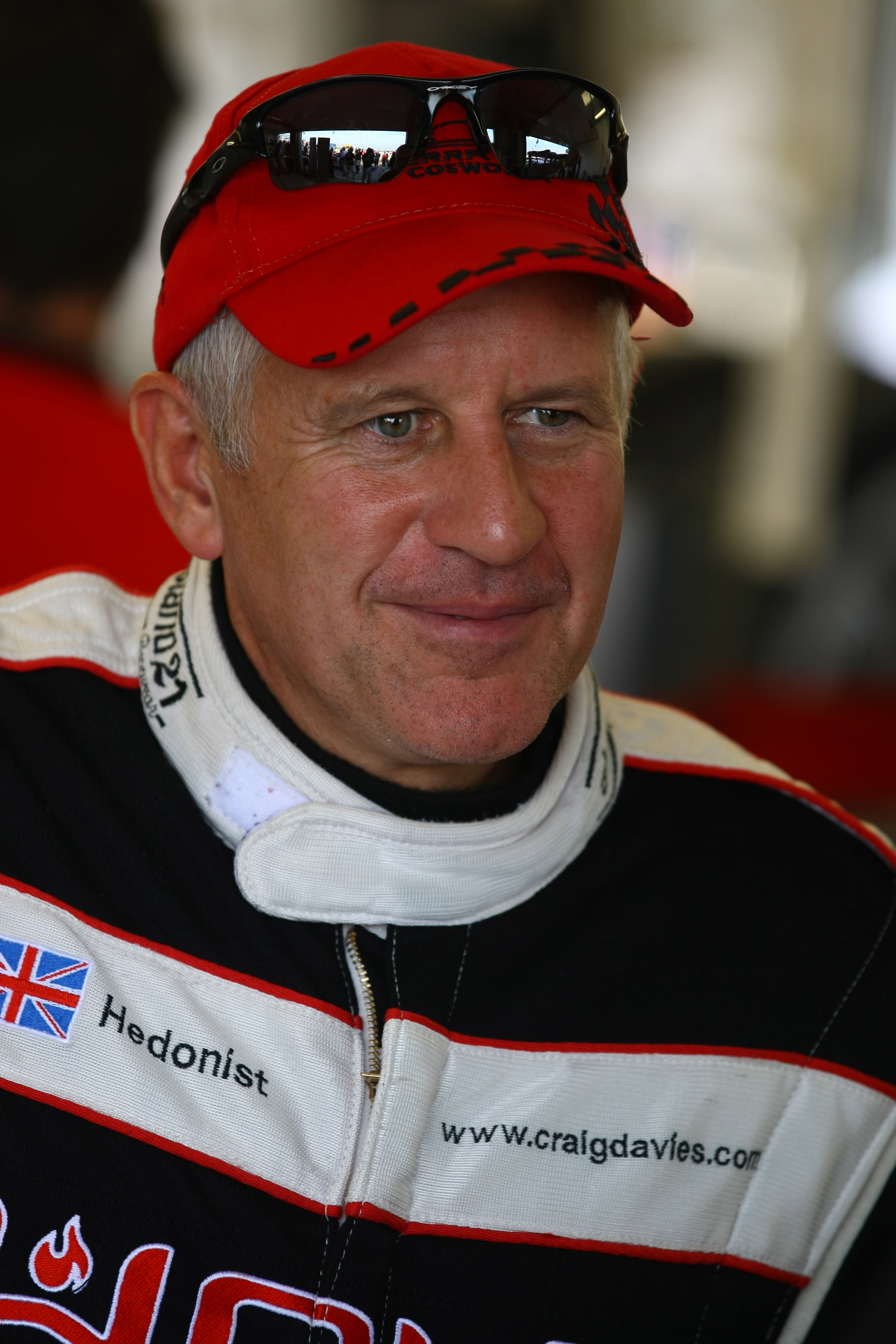
- Davies at the Circuit de Spa-Francorchamps 2018
- Nationality: (United Kingdom) British
- Born: 15 November 1960 (age 65) Romford, Essex, England, UK

FIA Masters Historic career
- Debut season: 1987 (ModProd Saloon)
- Current team: SZ Motorsport
- Car number: 7,9,15
- Starts: 228
- Wins: 61
- Podiums: 97
- Poles: 16
- Fastest laps: 19
- Finished last season: 1st

Craig Davies (born 15 November 1960) is a British racing driver currently competing in the FIA Masters Historic Racing, Goodwood Revival events and 6 hours of Spa. He races for the SZ Motorsport Team who run a number of historic cars including an ex works Alan Mann Mustang, Ford GT40, Boss Mustang and Corvette Stingray[2]. He is also an entrepreneur and runs Sub-Zero Wolf for UK/Europe.

== Racing career ==
Davies started Kart Racing in the UK 100 national A 1983-1985 then 1997-1999 and saloon cars from 1987 taking many fastest laps and podiums, winning the Falken Modified Production Saloon Championship in 1995. In 2010 he started the SZ Motorsport racing team and raced saloon cars including RS500 Cosworth and Britcar racing series in the UK. with numerous wins including the Masters Historic 2016. Other wins include 25 April 2012 win in the Britcar Production Cup race at Donington Park with co-driver Adam Jones. and the 2012 Silverstone Classic on 22 July 2012. Davies regularly competes in the 24Hr Silverstone, Spa 6 Hr, Goodwood Revival and Members meetings with co drivers including Derek Bell, Jason Plato, Robb Gravett, Oliver Gavin.

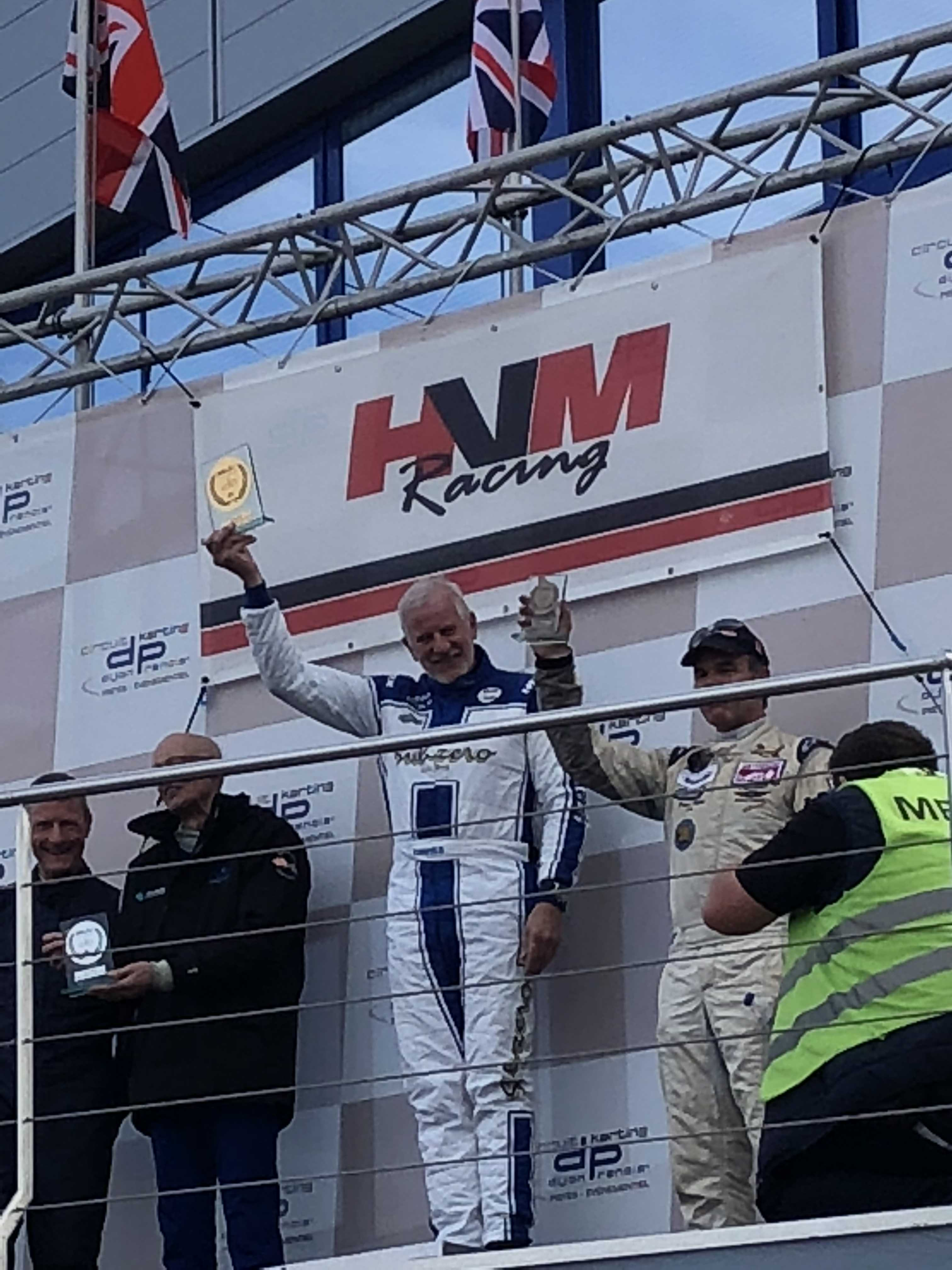
Craig Davies wins Masters at Dijon-Prenois

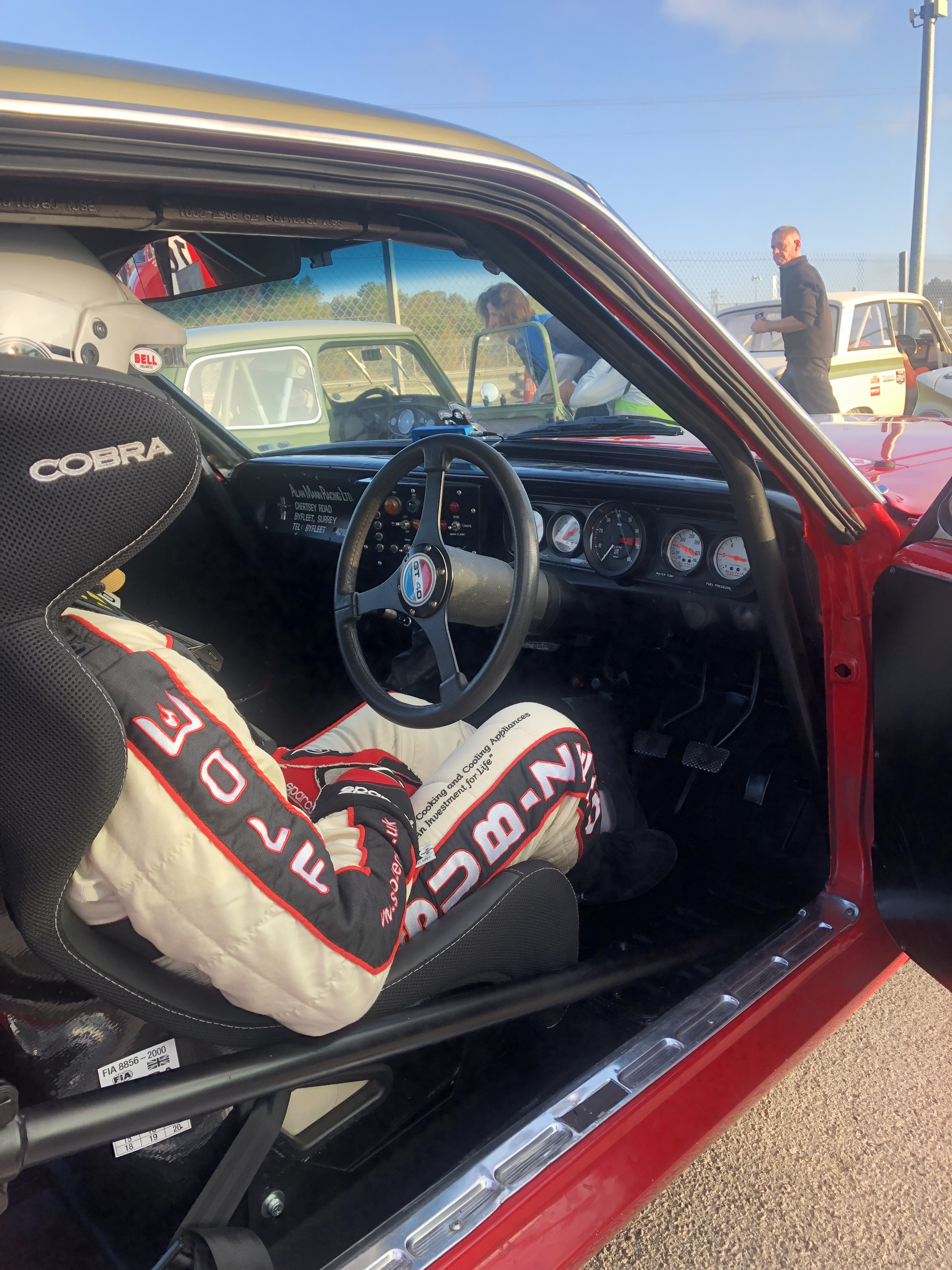
Craig Davies on board AMR Mustang

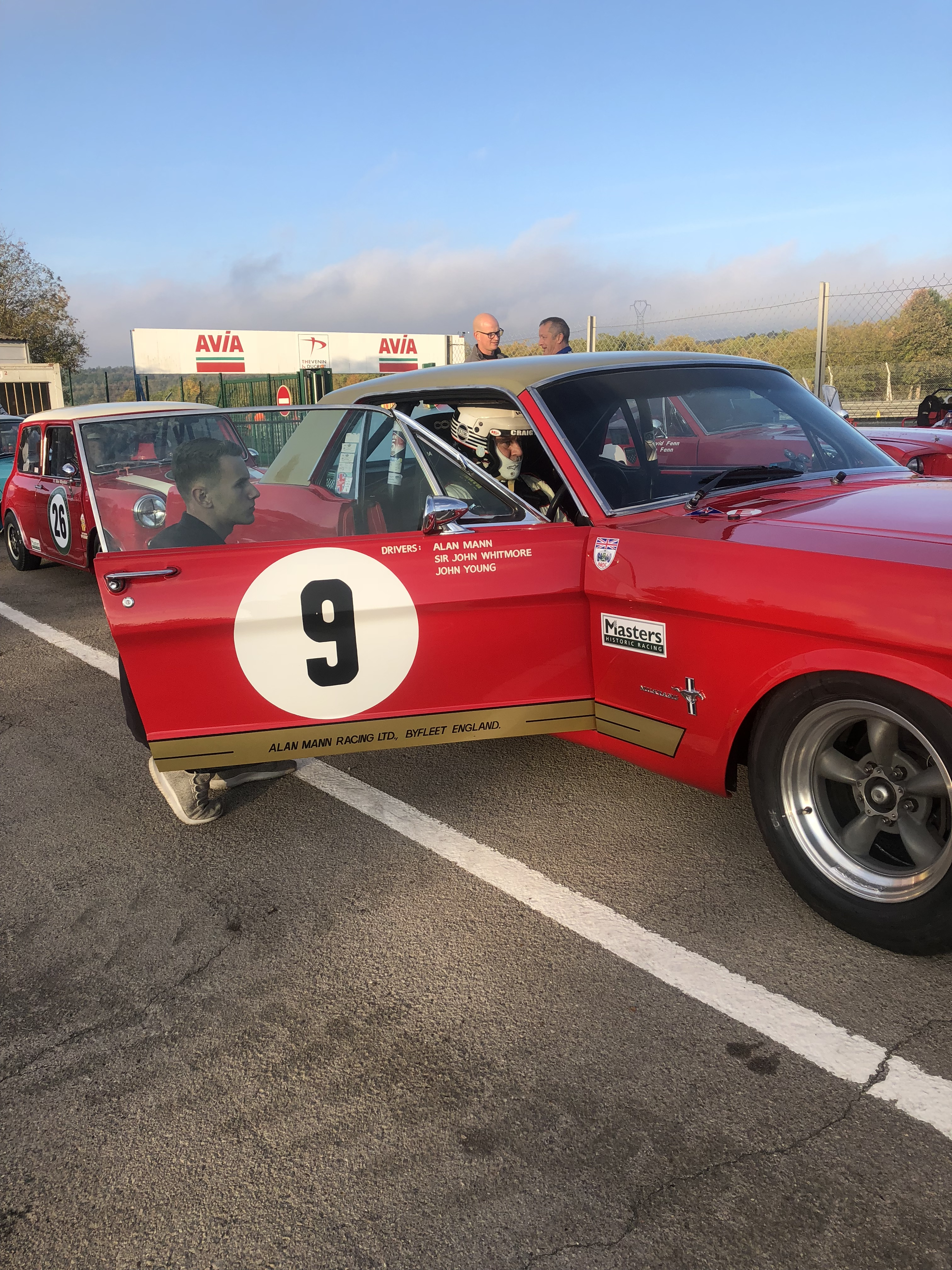
Alana Mann Racing Mustang

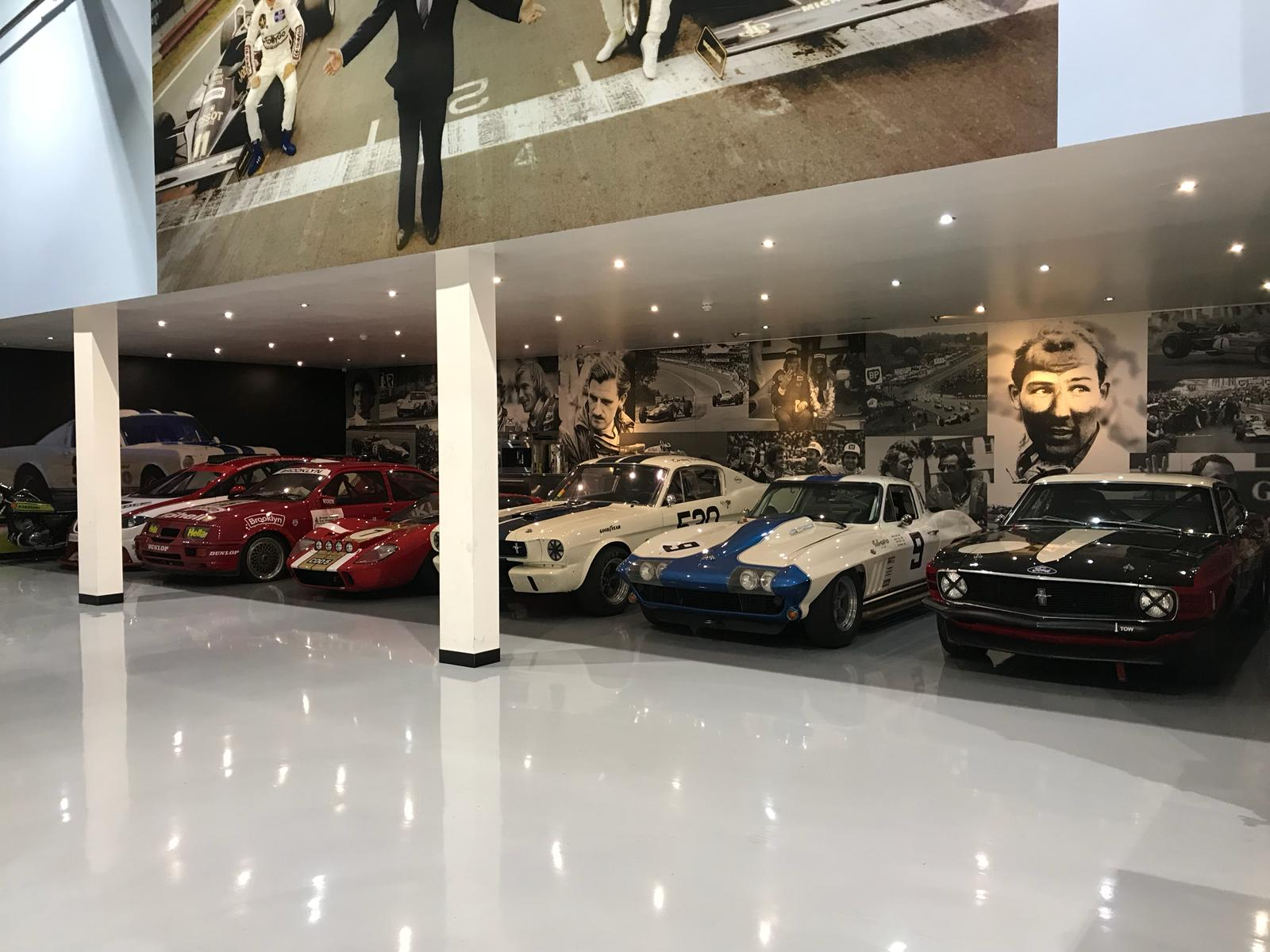
SZ Motorsport Cars

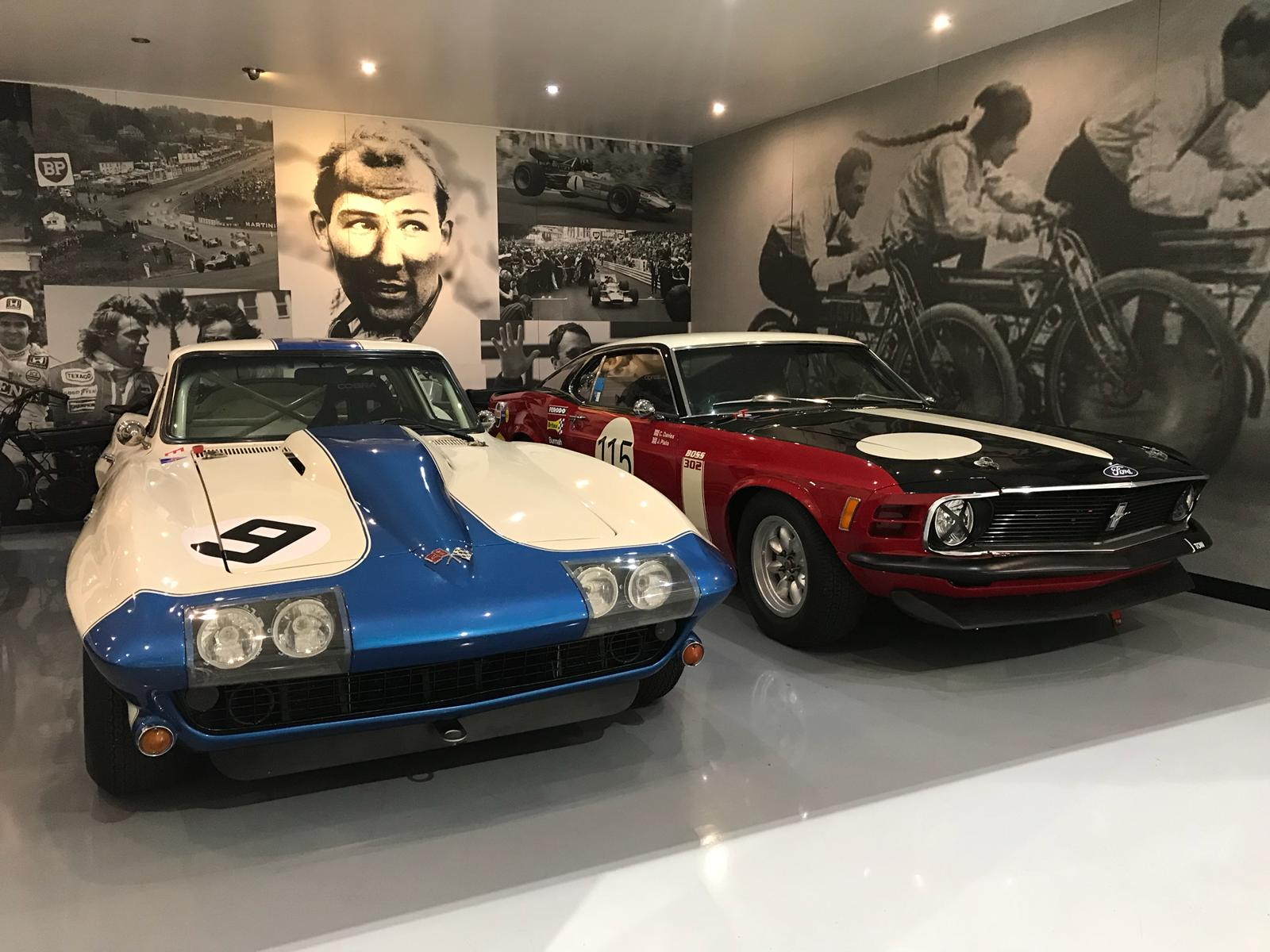
SZ Motorsport Corvette and Boss Mustang

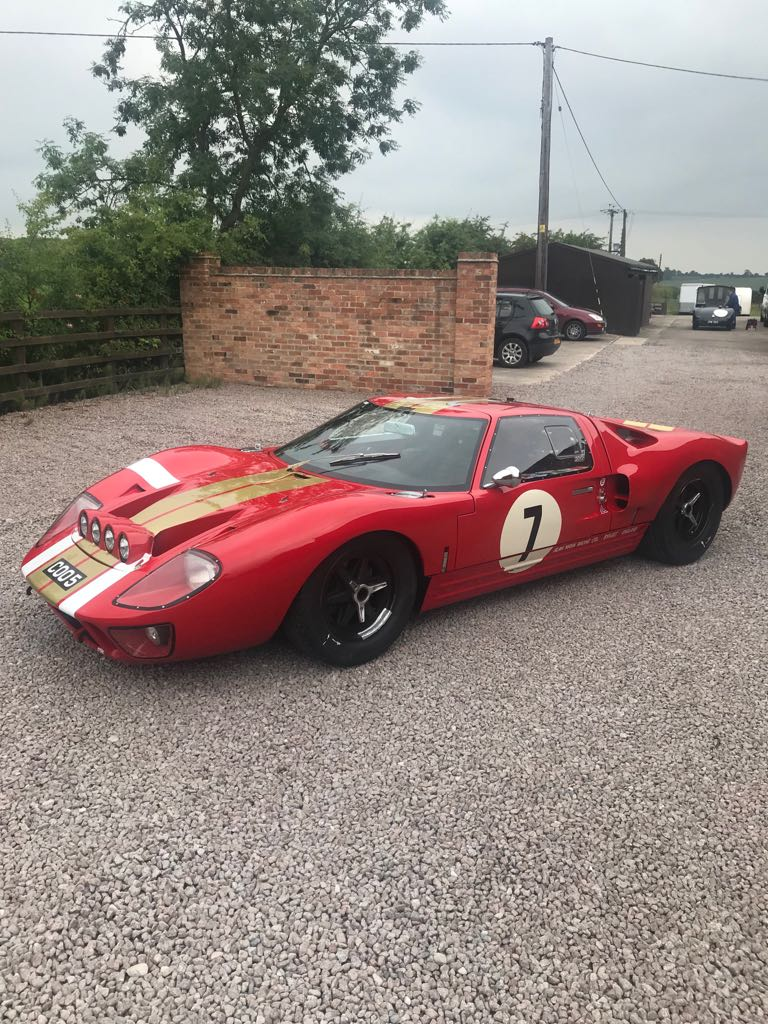
SZ Motorsport Alan mann GT4O

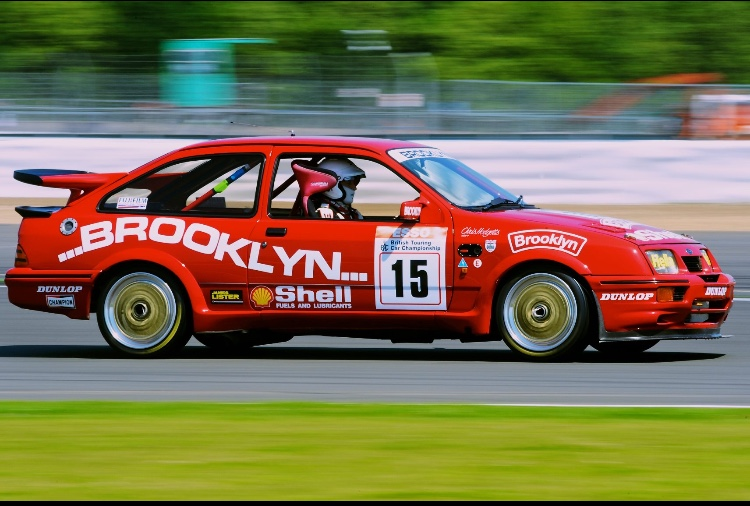
RS500 Brooklyn Sierra

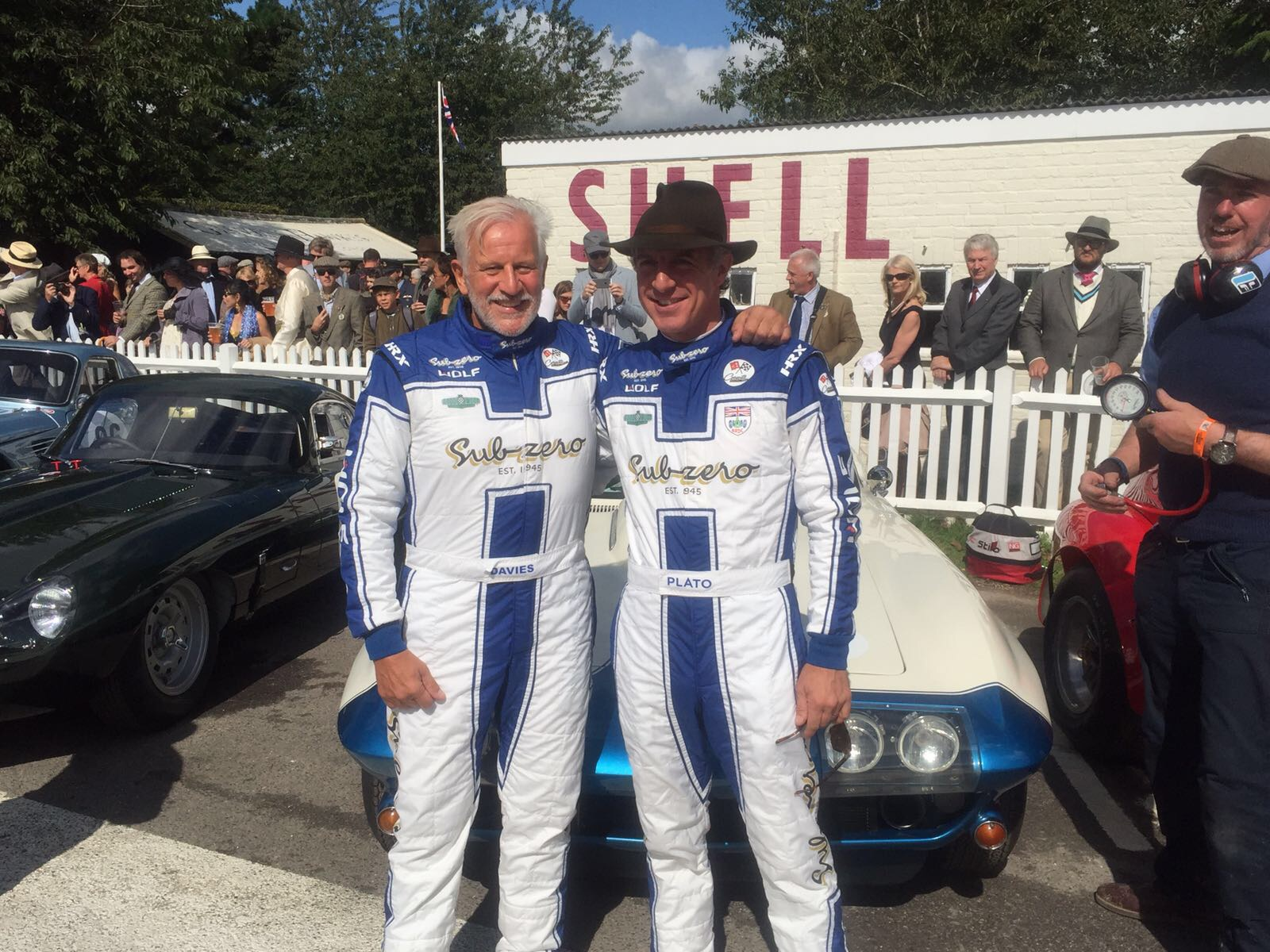
Goodwood Revival 2018 Corvette Stingray

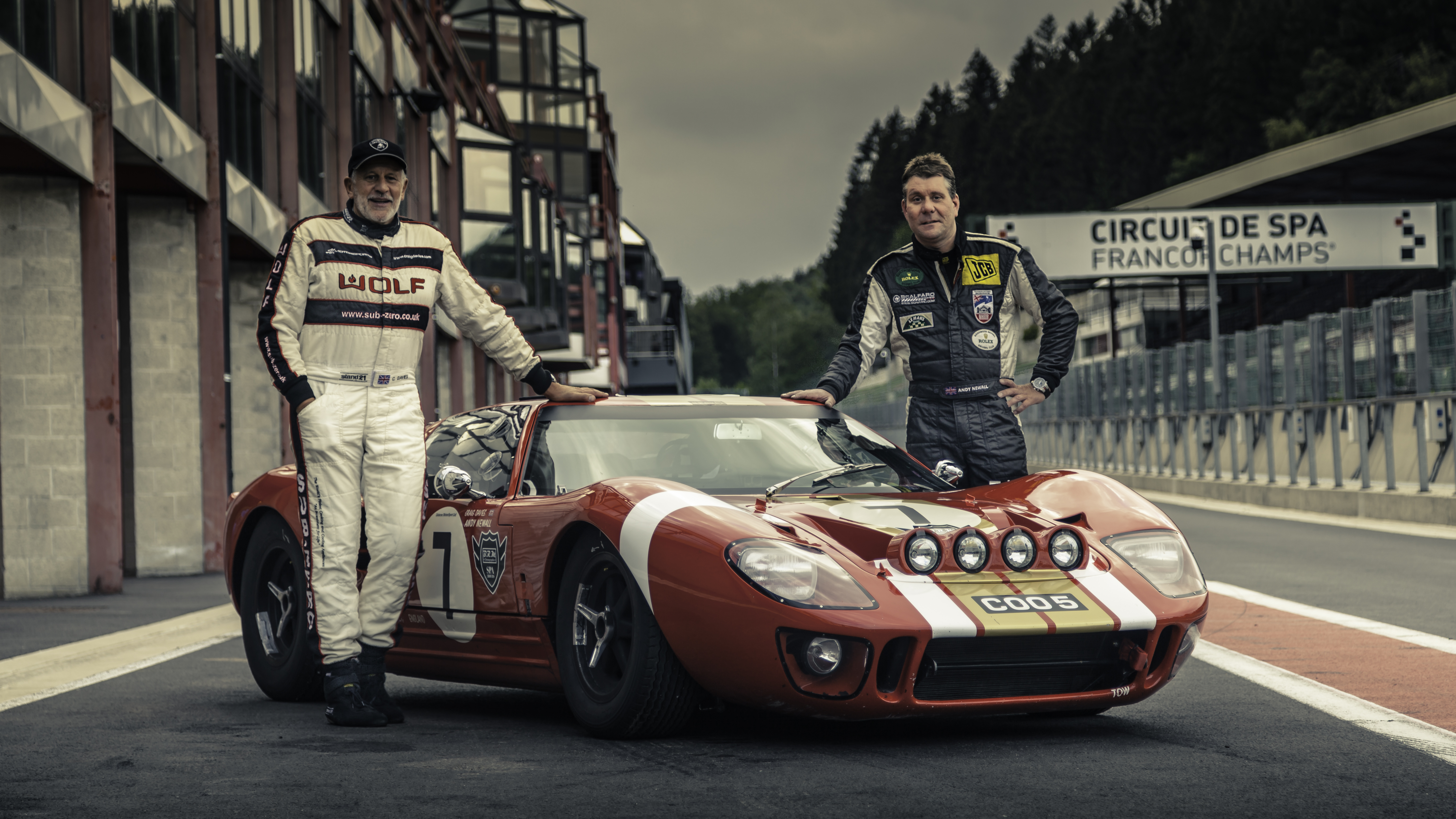
GT40 Spa Six Hours

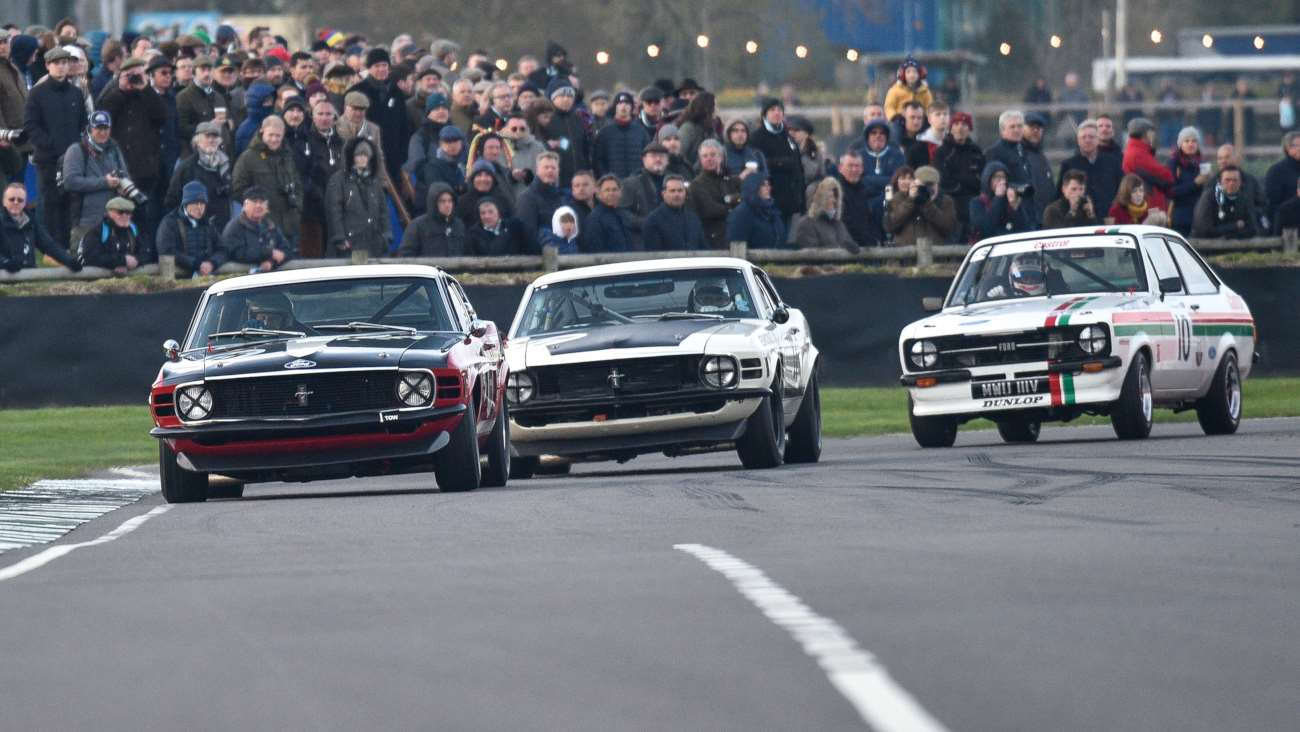
Boss Mustang at Goodwood Members Meeting 2019

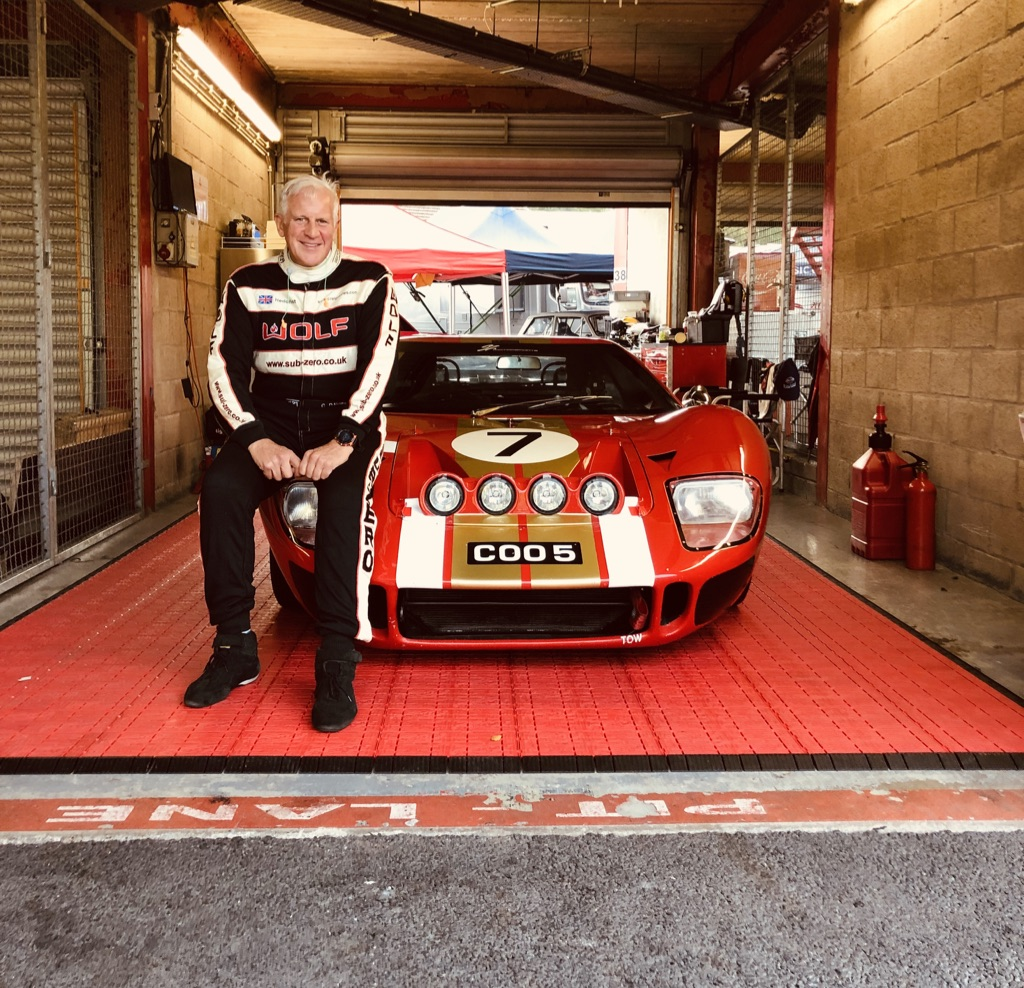
GT40 Alan Mann Racing Craig Davies

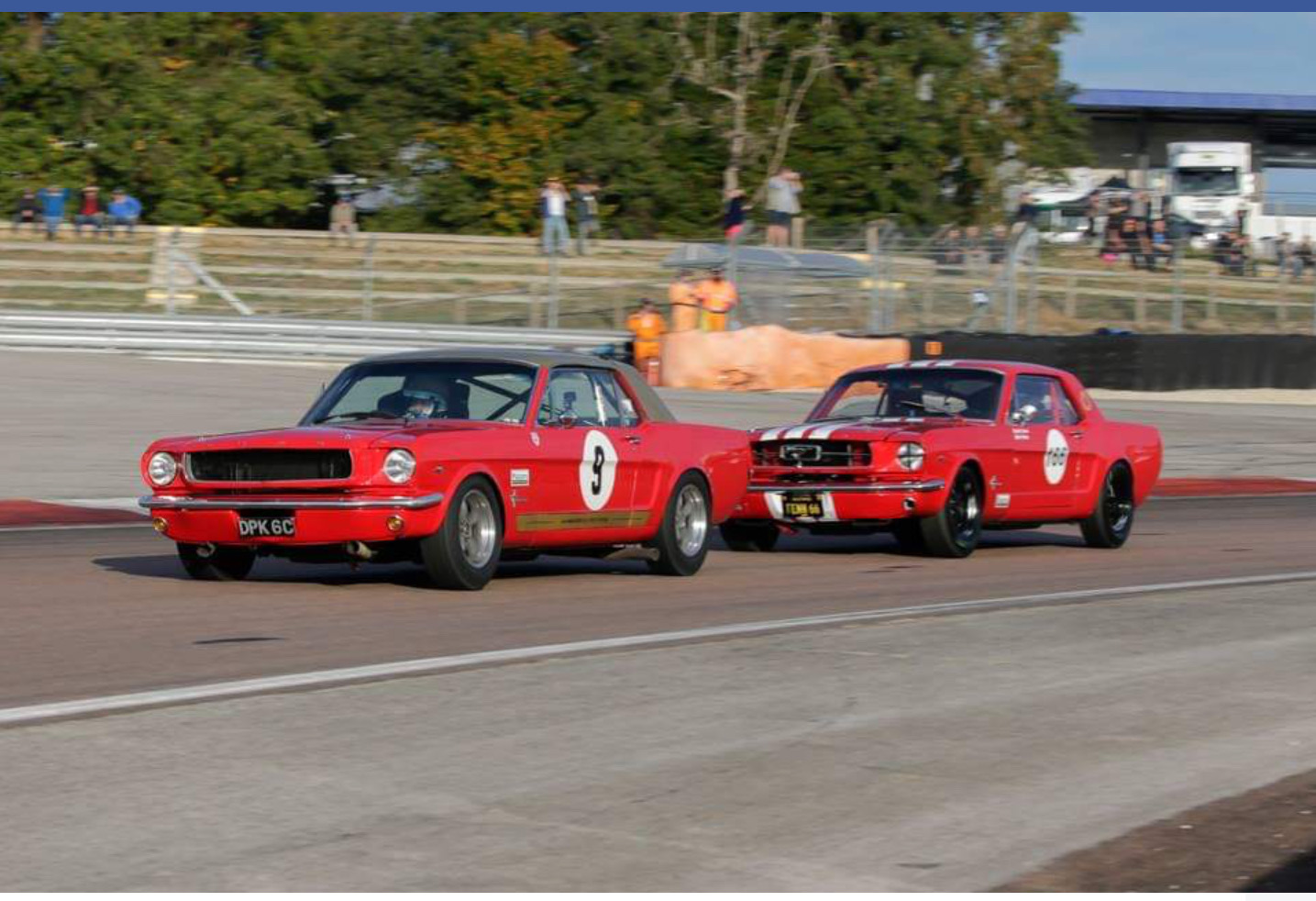
Alan Mann Mustang Craig Davies

== Results ==
	Series	Car	Race	Co driver				
2010	Britcar	BMW 130i	24 Hr	Adam Jones	Silverstone 9 (class) 23 (overall)			
2010	Thundersaloon	Sierra RS500	Championship		Pembrey 10, 2			
2010	DMN Saloons	Sierra RS500	Championship		Brands Hatch (Mar) 3, 5	Brands Hatch (May) 4, 2	Snetterton (Jul) 4	Brands Hatch (Aug) 2
2011	Masters Gentlemen Drivers	Corvette Stingray	Pre-65 GT	Joss Ronchetti	Silverstone 18			
2011	Classic	Sierra RS500	Thunder Saloons		Pembrey NC			
2011	Classic	Corvette Stingray	Six Hour Classic	Joss Ronchetti	Spa-Francorchamps 8			
2011	BritCar	Seat SuperCopa	24 Hour	Adam Jones	Silverstone 7 (class), 15 (overall)			
2011	Guards Trophy	Corvette Stingray	GT		Silverstone (May) 4 (class), 11 (overall)	Brands Hatch (Jul) 1 (class), 23 (overall)		
2011	Classic	Sierra RS500	Thunder Saloons		Snetterton 3			
2012	Britcar	Seat SuperCopa	Endurance	Adam Jones	Snetterton 9	Silverstone 3	Donington 1	Oulton Park 1
2012	SVRA Endurance	Shelby Mustang	Classic		Sebring 1 (class), 2 (overall)			
2012	HSCC	Shelby Mustang	Guards Trophy		Silverstone 1 (class) 5 (overall)			
2012	Masters	Shelby Mustang	&0's Celebration	Joss Ronchetti	Brands Hatch FL, DNF			
2012	Silverstone Classic	Sierra RS500	Touring Cars		Silverstone 1 (class), 6 (overall)			
2012	BritCar	Seat SuperCopa	Endurance	Adam Jones	Brands Hatch 3			
2012	Bernie's V8's	Shelby Mustang	Speed Fest		Castle Combe 2			
2013	Silverstone Classic	Sierra RS500	Super Touring		Silverstone 1 (class), 3 (overall)			
2013	Silverstone Classic	Corvette Stingray	Pre-65 GT	Adam Jones	Silverstone DNF			
2013	HSSC	Corvette Stingray	Guards Trophy		Silverstone 2 (class), 5 (overall)			
2013	GT & Sportscar Cup	Corvette Stingray	Pre-65 GT	John Young	Silverstone 4			
2013	Bernie's V8's	Shelby Mustang	Speed Fest		Brands Hatch 9 (class), 17 (overall)			
2013	Masters	Corvette Stingray	Pre-65		Brands Hatch 3 (class), 6 (overall)			
2013	Masters	Shelby Mustang	70's Celebration		Brands Hatch 2 (class), 7 (overall)			
2013	BritCar	Seat SuperCopa	Endurance	Adam Jones	Donington 2			

	Series	Car	Race	Co driver			
2014	Goodwood Members	AMR GT40	Surtees Trophy	Henry Mann	Goodwood 9		
2014	Silverstone International	Corvette Stingray	Guards Trophy		Silverstone 2		
2014	Classic/Revival	Sierra RS500	Revival		Silverstone 1 (class), 14 (overall)	Silverstone 1 (class), 12 (overall)	Thruxton 1 (class), 11 (overall)
2014	Classic	AMR GT40	Six Hour Classic	John Young	Spa-Francorchamps 6 (class) 7 (overall)		
2014	Masters Gentlemen Drivers	Corvette Stingray	Pre-66 GT	Adam Jones	Donington 4 (class), 10 (overall)		
2015	Goodwood Members	Corvette Stingray	Graham Hill Trophy	Jason Plato	Goodwood 8		
2015	Masters Gentlemen Drivers	Corvette Stingray	Pre-66 GT		Brands Hatch 7, 8	Silverstone 11	
2015	Historic Festival	Sierra RS500	Super Touring		Donington DNF, 1		
2015	Classic	AMR GT40	Six Hour Classic	Newall / Young	Spa-Francorchamps 6		
2016	Masters	AMR Mustang	Pre-66 Touring Cars		Brands Hatch 1	Silverstone 1	Spa-Francorchamps 1
2016	Hankook	Seat SuperCopa	24 Hour	Rob Smith Paul Smith	Silverstone 8 (class) 22 (overall)		
2016	Super Prix	Corvette Stingray	GT & Sports Car		Brands Hatch DNF		
2016	Masters Gentlemen Drivers	Corvette Stingray	Pre-66 GT		Silverstone 18		
2016	Historic Festival	Sierra RS500	Super Touring		Silverstone 1 (class) 7 (overall)	Silverstone 2 (class) 12 (overall)	
2016	Goodwood Revival	Corvette Stingray	Tourist Trophy	Gavin	Goodwood DNF		
2016	Classic	AMR GT40	Six Hour Classic	Newall / Young	Spa-Francorchamps 3		
2017	Goodwood Members	AMR Mustang	Pierpoint Cup		Goodwood 1		
2017	Masters	AMR Mustang	Pre-66 Touring Cars		Brands Hatch DNF	Spa-Francrchamps DNF	
2017	Classic	AMR GT40	Six Hour Classic		Spa-Francorchamps DNF		

	Series	Car	Race	Co driver				
2018	Masters	AMR Mustang	Pre-66 Touring Cars		Brands Hatch DNF	Oulton Park DNF	Silverstone 2	Dijon-Prenois 1
2018	South African Passion for Speed	Shelby Mustang	GT & Sports Car		Zwartkops 1			
2018	Goodwood Members	Boss Mustang	Gerry Marshall Trophy	Henry Mann	Goodwood DNF			
2018	Goodwood Members	AMR GT40	Gurney Cup		Goodwood 4			
2018	Summer Classic	AMR GT40			Spa-Francrchamps DNF			
2018	Masters	Corvette Stingray	Pre-65 GT		Silverstone DNF			
2018	Masters	AMR Mustang	Pre-65 Touring Cars		Silverstone 2			
2018	Legends	Boss Mustang	Gold Cup		Oulton Park DNF 1			
2018	Goodwood Revival	Corvette Stingray	Tourist Trophy	Plato	Goodwood 6			
2018	Classic	AMR GT40	Six Hour Classic	Young / Newall	Spa-Francrchamps 2			
2018	Masters	AMR Mustang	Pre-65 Touring Cars		Dijon 1			

	Series	Car	Race	Co driver	
2019	Goodwood Members	Boss Mustang	Gerry Marshall Trophy	Andy Newall	Goodwood 1st
2019	Goodwood Members	AMR GT40	Gurney Cup		Goodwood 2nd
2019	Goodwood Members	Boss Mustang			Goodwood 3rd
2019	Goodwood Members	Corvette Stingray	Graham Hill Trophy	Andy Newall	Goodwood DNF
2019	Masters	AMR Mustang	Pre-66 Touring Cars		Brands Hatch 3rd
2019	Masters	AMR Mustang	Pre-66 Touring Cars		Donington 1st
2019	Silverstone Classic	Sierra RS500	Racing Legends		Silverstone 2nd
2019	Silverstone Classic	AMR Mustang	Pre-66 Touring Cars		Silverstone 2nd
2019	Silverstone Classic	Corvette Stingray	Gentleman's Drivers	Ray Donner	Silverstone DNF
2019	Spa Six Hour	AMR GT40	Six Hour Classic	Andy Newall	Spa-Francrchamps DNF
2019	Spa Six Hour	AMR Mustang	Six Hour Classic		Spa-Francrchamps 1st

	Series	Car	Race	Co driver	
2020	Masters	AMR Mustang	Pre-66 Touring Cars		Donington 1st
2020	Goodwood Speedweek	Boss Mustang	Gerry Marshall Trophy	Jason Plato	Goodwood 4th
2020	Goodwood Speedweek	Boss Mustang	Gerry Marshall Sprint		Goodwood 1st

== Drivers ==
Davies has co-driven a number of cars with British racing drivers including Derek Bell, Jason Plato, Rob Gravett and Oliver Gavin. He has also co-driven with the Alan Mann's son Henry Mann in his fathers Ford GT40 now owned and run by SZ Motorsport

== Personal life ==
Davies was born in Romford, Essex, England, and was educated at Nevin Drive. He is married to Sandy and they have a son Miles. He runs Sub-Zero Wolf and is a supporter of the Haven House Charity.
