= Dallara SP1 =

Le Mans Prototype built by Italian firm Dallara

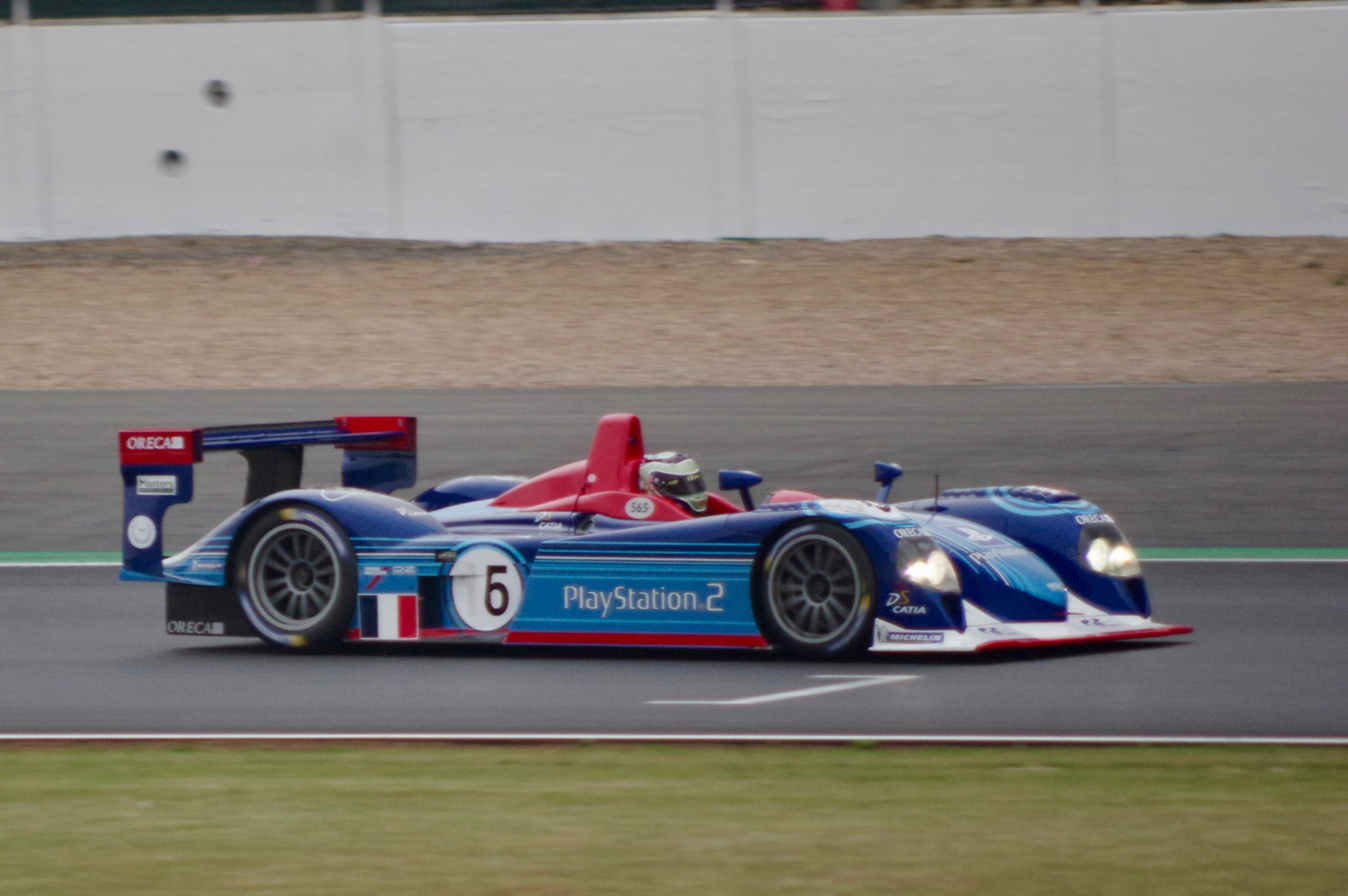
2001 Dallara SP1 at the 2019 Silverstone Classic

The Dallara SP1, also known as the Chrysler LMP, was a Le Mans Prototype built by Italian firm Dallara. Initially used as part of Chrysler Corporation's attempt to win the 24 Hours of Le Mans, the cars were later sold to customers for use series such as the FIA Sportscar Championship and Le Mans Series.

== Development ==
Following Dallara's work in constructing the Toyota GT-One in 1998, Audi R8R in 1999, and Audi R8 in 2000, the company decided to use their expertise to develop their own Le Mans Prototype for the LMP900 class in 2001, specifically for use by customer teams as an alternative to the factory-backed efforts.

While the design of the SP1 was still being completed, Chrysler Corporation was in the process of expanding their Le Mans program. Following years of success with their Chrysler Viper GTS-R program, including three class wins, Chrysler had begun development work in the use of a Le Mans Prototype, including running two Reynard prototypes in 2000. For 2001 Chrysler, with partner Oreca, decided to concentrate solely on prototypes, ending their Viper program. Looking for a more capable car to replace the Reynard, Chrysler approached Dallara and decided to use the SP1 that Dallara was still in the process of completing. With a partnership agreed upon, the cars became known as Chrysler LMPs, and would use a Mopar 6.0L V8. Oreca assisted Dallara in the development of the SP1 chassis, leading to its chassis using the designation DO (Dallara-Oreca).

Following Chrysler's withdrawal from the program, the Mopar V8 would be replaced by Judd V10s, ranging from 4.0 litres to 5.0 litres, for use by privateers. In 2005, Rollcentre Racing would install a turbocharged Nissan VQ V6 based on a JGTC unit, in an agreement with Nissan Motorsports for testing the possible use of the engine in a customer program. The project would however be considered a failure. An X-Trac 6-speed sequential-shift gearbox unit would be used throughout the history of the SP1, although it was upgraded in 2005 by Rollcentre to use a paddle-shift system.

The SP1's design was very different from prototypes like the Audi R8, using many curved design elements including a large, rounded nose and footbox and sweeping fenders. The SP1 also featured a large air intake nacelle located on the side of the chassis, although this was later moved to a more tradition location on top near the rollover hoop. The design would also incorporate the use of multiple dive plans, including the first use of some on the nose. Later, vertical boards would be added to the rear tail in order to help increase downforce in conjunction with the rear wing.

== Racing history ==
As part of their deal with Chrysler, Dallara promised to provide three SP1s for use in the 2001 24 Hours of Le Mans. However, in preparation for their Le Mans debut, Chrysler used the new European Le Mans Series for an opportunity to test their new car in competition. Appearing at Donington Park, the Chrysler LMP managed to qualify in fourth place behind three Audi R8s. Mechanical problems, however, saw the car finish well down the order, nearly 40 laps behind the winning R8s.

With more testing following their debut at Donington, the team was able to improve and the three Chrysler LMPs appeared at Le Mans showing some speed. One of the three entries managed to take the sixth fastest qualifying time (Olivier Beretta driving), beating out both of the Bentley EXP Speed 8s. During the race itself, the Chryslers were able to remain in the top ten for most of the race until mechanical woes took out one entry halfway through the race. In the final hours, while running fourth and fifth, another Chrysler LMP suffered a fire on the Mulsannes straight, taking it out of the race. The lone remaining Chrysler was left to take a fourth-place finish, 23 laps behind the winning Audi R8.

Even with a fourth-place finish in their debut, Chrysler Corporation decided that the Le Mans project was no longer fruitful, and they canceled the entire program at the end of 2001. Chrysler's partner, Oreca, decided to continue on with the program as a privateer, replacing the Mopar V8 engines with Judd GV4 V10s. Although purchasing three SP1s, Oreca decided to use a two-car effort for Le Mans while the third car would be used in the FIA Sportscar Championship. In the first race of the season, the SP1 showed its potential by finishing second behind a Pescarolo Sport, then followed this up by gaining its first win at Autódromo do Estoril. For Le Mans, the SP1s continued to show the pace they had in 2001, taking the fourth-fastest qualifying time behind the trio of R8s. In the race itself, both SP1s performed well, remaining immediately behind the leading R8s and Bentley for the entire race, finishing in fifth and sixth place overall, both cars 16 laps behind the winner. Oreca would not continue with the SP1s, deciding to take a brief hiatus from prototypes to work on other projects.

Besides Oreca's efforts, one of Chrysler's former SP1s was purchased by American team Doran Racing for use in the Grand American Road Racing Championship, with drivers Didier Theys and Mauro Baldi. Doran's SP1, which was slightly modified to meet the SRP regulations yet would install the Judd GV4 (later upgraded to a GV5) like Oreca, was a championship contender in the series. In its debut at the 24 Hours of Daytona, the Doran took the overall win by six laps, earning the Dallara its first victory. Doran would continue with their winning ways by taking the next two rounds at Homestead-Miami Speedway and California Speedway, with a final victory on the season at Mont-Tremblant. Doran would end up taking second place in the team's championship, a mere nine points behind Dyson Racing. Doran would also make an appearance at the American Le Mans Series' 12 Hours of Sebring, although it would fail to finish due to an accident.

For 2003, Doran would be the only ones to use a Dallara SP1. Due to changing Grand-Am regulations, the team would not return. Instead, the team would turn to the American Le Mans Series, starting the season at the 2003 12 Hours of Sebring. The car would manage a seventh-place finish, again just behind a trio of Audi R8s and a duo of Bentley V8s, with a lone Panoz managing to beat out the privateer Dallara. The next two rounds saw Doran taking a fifth-place finish, then a fourth. The team did not return for the rest of the season, though, quickly ending Dallara's involvement in 2003.

For 2004, two SP1s would be purchased by the new team Rollcentre Racing of the United Kingdom. Rollcentre would debut at the 12 Hours of Sebring, continuing the strong performance of SP1s at Sebring by taking fifth place after running 3rd, a broken throttle cable dropping them down to 5th. Rollcentre would then concentrate on the new Le Mans Endurance Series, earning a best finish of fifth place at Monza and taking eighth place in the teams championship. For Le Mans, Rollcentre entered a lone car, and performed well and at 6.30 am on Sunday, they were running in 4th place overall (in the teams first Le Mans 24) until they were taken out in a large accident for team owner Martin Short caused by damage from a previous incident where the Pescarolo driven by Sebastian Bourdais ran into Short, causing unseen damage to the left rear suspension, which subsequently failed in the Porsche curves. Rollcentre then switched to their second Dallara chassis 006 for the rest of the year. Another SP1 had also been bought in 2004, by Italian squad Spinnaker Clandesteam, for use in the Le Mans Endurance Series and 24 Hours of Le Mans. This came to a quick end after the first race of LMES saw the car fail after twenty laps; the team withdrew their Le Mans entry and were dissolved.

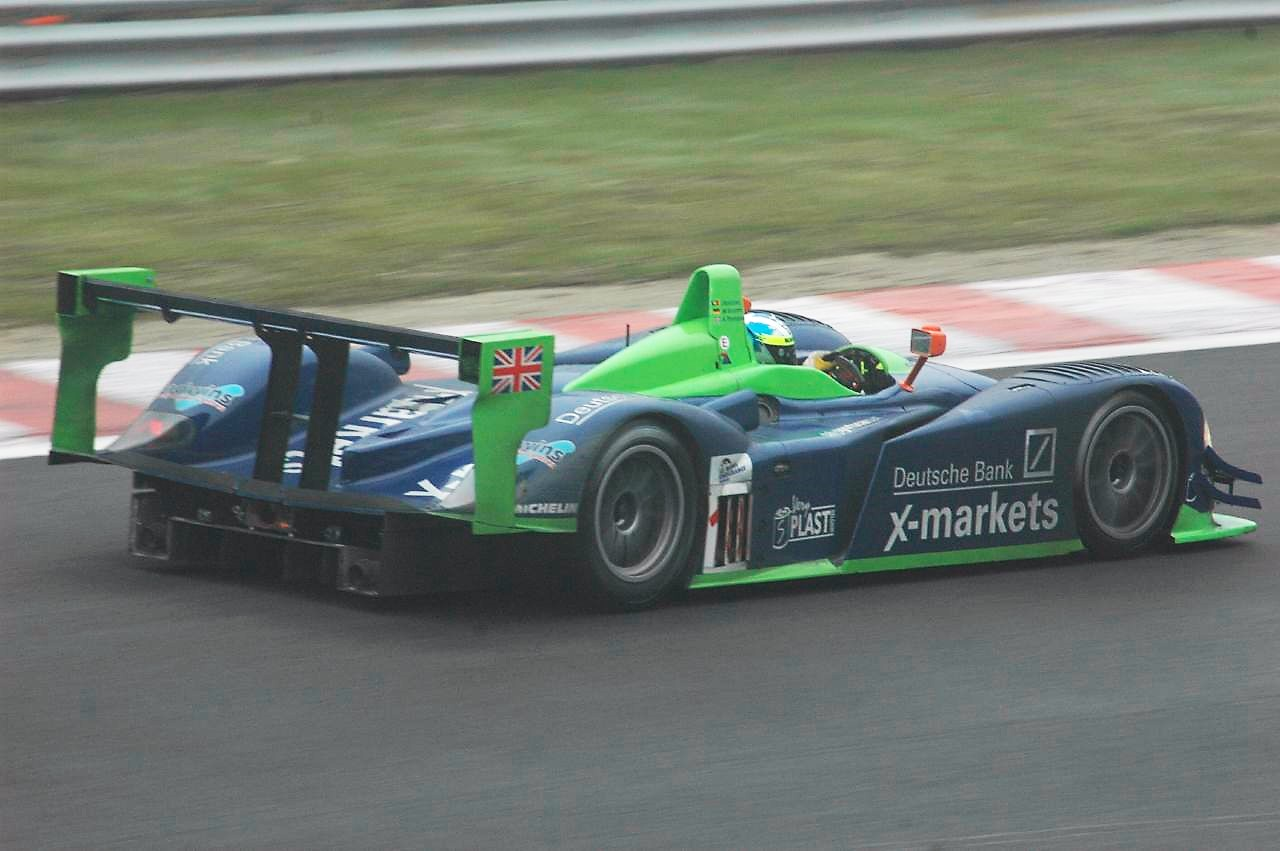
A rear view of the Nissan-powered SP1, which features slightly modified bodywork to include inlet ducts on the rear fenders for the turbochargers.

Going into 2005, Rollcentre had repaired SP1 chassis 004 for use in a two-car effort in the Le Mans Endurance Series. Chassis 004 had its Judd V10 replaced with a new Nissan engine, in a partnership with Nissan Motorsports to experiment with the engine to test the possibility of Nissan providing it as a customer unit in the future. Rollcentre had upgraded the SP1's gearbox with a paddle-shift unit in 2004 and now both cars had it. Rollcentre decided to debut their Nissan-powered SP1 at the 12 Hours of Sebring, although the car would fail to finish due to problems with the Nismo engine. Back in Europe after a switch from Dunlops to Michelins, Rollcentre's Judd-powered car would have strong performances, including three straight podium finishes, earning the car fourth place in the teams championship. The Nissan-powered car suffered various problems throughout the season, however, scoring no points until Nissan officially ended the project and a Judd engine was placed back in the car. For Le Mans, both cars were entered, with the Nissan-powered car yet again failing to finish, while the Judd-powered SP1 took a distant 16th-place finish after actually leading the race outright early Saturday evening, although the lead was never credited as it took place whilst the lead Audi was in the pits, and regained the lead going into Mulsanne corner. The car though was running a very strong 2nd place against strong opposition . A power steering fluid leak as night came on caused serious issues, requiring the team to pit stop almost double the nowmal amount and the race was gone.

Following the 2005 season, Le Mans Prototype regulations were changed, leaving the SP1s no longer legal. Although extensive modification could have allowed the SP1 to become legal in 2006, Rollcentre Racing decided to switch to a new car in a new class. Thus the Dallara SP1s career came to an end.

Chassis 004 was sold to the USA by Rollcentre, but then found its way back to the UK, now owned by James Cottingham, and Max Girado. Rollcentre were then reunited with the car to look after it for historica races. Martin Short owns the 006 car, and has run a number of events, winning class in the Masters Endurance Legeneds at Spa, Brands Hatch and Silverstone in 2017/18, and in 2019 carried out demo runs along with the sister 004 car at Goodwood members meeting in March.

== Chassis history ==
A total of six Dallara SP1s were built, with three being known as Chrysler LMPs. SP1s #DO 001 (4 victories), #DO 003 (1 victory) and #DO 005 (1 victory) were the only chassis to score victories in their non historic lifetime. Chassis 006 has scored 3 class victories in Masters Endurance Legends.

#DO 001

- Chrysler-Oreca (2001)
- Doran Lista Racing (2002–2003)

#DO 002

- Chrysler-Oreca (2001)

#DO 003

- Chrysler-Oreca (2001)
- Oreca (2002)
- Spinnaker Clandesteam (2004)

#DO 004

- Oreca (2002)
- Rollcentre Racing (2004–2005)

#DO 005

- Doran Racing (2002-2003)

#DO 006

- Oreca (2002)
- Rollcentre Racing (2005)
