= Silverstone Classic =

Race event

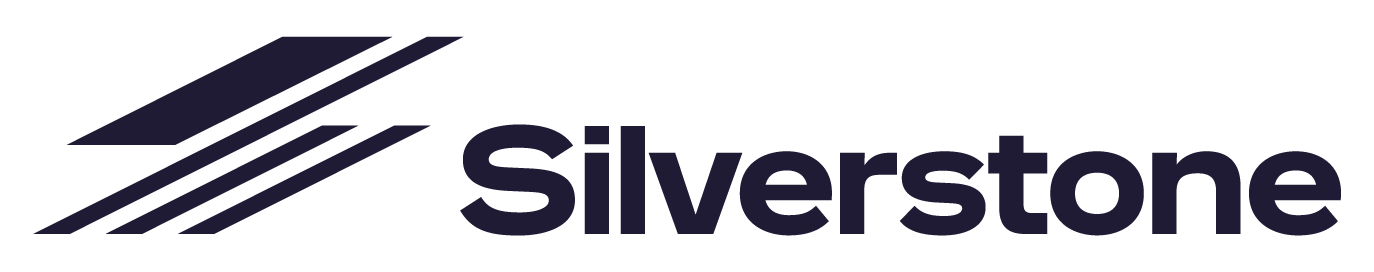
- Status: active
- Genre: Motoring festival
- Frequency: Annually
- Venue: Silverstone Circuit, Northamptonshire, England
- Coordinates: 52.0733°N 1.0147°E
- Country: England
- Inaugurated: July 1990
- Founder: Stuart Graham
- Most recent: 2022
- Attendance: 109,000
- Website: www.silverstoneclassic.com

Silverstone Festival (previously known as Silverstone Classic) is an annual three-day Festival featuring historic motorsport, live music and family-friendly entertainment at the Silverstone Circuit, home of the British Grand Prix. The event attracts hundreds of historic race cars in 20 races over the weekend, displays from over 100 car clubs with more than 10,000 classic cars, free access to the paddocks and grandstands, interactive activities, dynamic demonstrations, live music on Friday, Saturday and Sunday evenings, a shopping village and lots more. Founded in 1990, the event was one of the first of motor sport meetings dedicated entirely to historic racing cars and celebrated its 30th anniversary online (thanks to COVID) in 2020 with postponed celebrations at the 2021 event. Originally held in late July, since 2022 the event has taken place over the August bank holiday weekend.

== Races ==
2024’s track programme at the Festival consists of 20 races from across Grand Prix, GT, Sports and Touring car history.

Both Silverstone’s paddock complexes are used during the weekend of the Festival to accommodate the large number of entrants, with racing taking place out of the National Paddock in the morning and the International Paddock in the afternoon.

== Anniversaries ==
2022 (26 to 28 August)

- 60th anniversary of the Ford Cortina
- 60th anniversary of the Morris 1100
- 60th anniversary of James Bond films
- 60th anniversary of the Shelby Cobra / AC Cobra
- 60th anniversary of the Lotus Elan
- 50th anniversary of BMW M
- 40th anniversary of the Group C

2021 (30 July to 1 August)

- 110th anniversary of Alfa Romeo
- 100th anniversary of the Lancia Lambda
- 70th anniversary of the Volkswagen Type 2
- 60th anniversary of the Jaguar E-Type
- 50th anniversary of the Triumph Stag
- 50th anniversary of the Range Rover
- 50th anniversary of the Datsun 240Z
- 40th anniversary of the DMC DeLorean
- 25th anniversary of the Lotus Elise
- 25th anniversary of the Porsche Boxster

2019 (26 to 28 July)

- 50th anniversary of Jackie Stewart's first win at Silverstone in 1969
- 100th anniversary of Bentley
- 70th anniversary of Abarth
- 60th anniversary of the Mini
- 50th anniversary of the Capri

2018 (20 to 22 July)

- 70th anniversary of the first British Grand Prix at Silverstone
- 60th anniversary of Formula Junior
- 60th anniversary of the British Touring Car Championship

2017 (28 to 30 July)

- Record-breaking display of McLarens to mark what would have been company founder, Bruce McLaren’s 80th birthday
- 40th anniversary of Williams and the 25th anniversary of Nigel Mansell’s Championship win with Williams
- 25th anniversary of the Jaguar XJ220

2016 (29 to 31 July)

- 50 Years of Can-Am racing - special double-header race named the 'Can-Am 50 Insterie Celebration Trophy' was the main feature.
- 40th anniversary of James Hunt's 1976 World Championship
- 50th anniversary of the Lamborghini Miura
- 35th anniversary of the Vauxhall Cavalier Mk2

2015 (24 to 26 July)

- 25th anniversary of the Silverstone Classic
- 50 Years of Alpina

2014 (25 to 27 July)

- Ford Mustang official 50th anniversary gathering with special displays and track parade
- Maserati centenary celebration
- World record parade of 84 grand prix cars led by Sir Stirling Moss to mark the 50th F1 grand prix at Silverstone

2013 (26 to 28 July)

- Special parade of 911 x Porsche 911 to celebrate the 50th birthday of the world's most successful sportscar
- Aston Martin centenary, celebrated with an extensive car display and a 100 car parade lap.
- Displays and parades to mark 50 years of Lamborghini

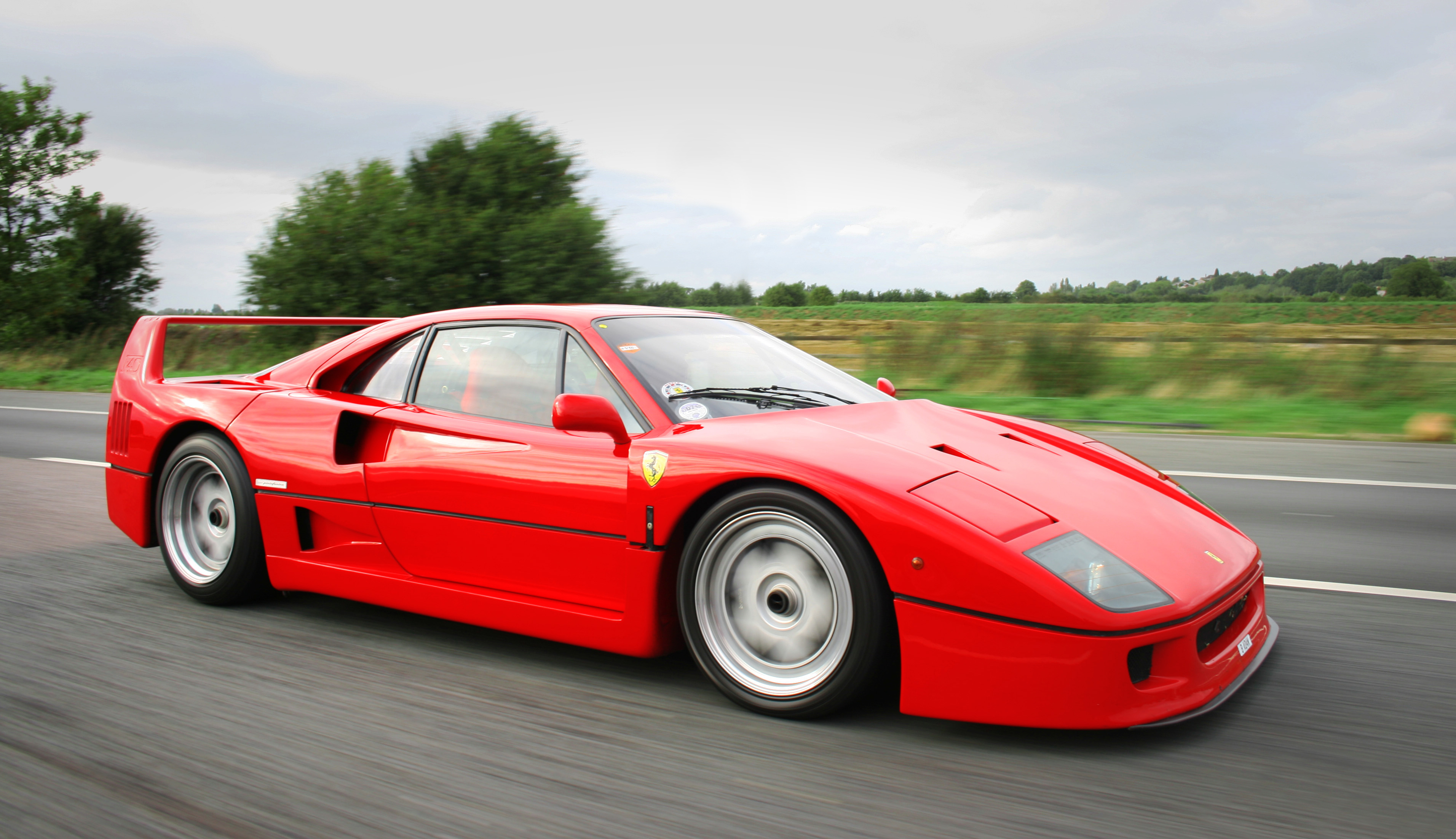
Ferrari F40 25th anniversary at 2012 Silverstone Classic

2012 (20 to 22 July)

- World record gathering of 60 Ferrari F40 to celebrate the supercar's 25th birthday
- MG MGB 50th anniversary
- Special 50th birthday parties for Lotus Elan and AC Cobra models
- Special races to mark 30 years of Group C sports prototypes and 25 years of the Ford Sierra RS500
- The UK's first Z-Fest to mark the 60th anniversary of the BMW Car Club

2011

- Jaguar E-Type 50th anniversary gathering, achieving the Guinness World Record for the Largest Parade of Jaguar cars with 767 cars on the track
- 21st Silverstone Classic event

2010

- Celebration of the 50th anniversary of Formula One

2009

- Mini 50th anniversary with four special races including the Laurence Bloom Memorial Trophy

== Other attractions ==
As well as the on-track racing, the Festival includes live music sets. Well known bands to have appeared in recent years include: McFly, Rick Astley, the Sugababes, ABC, The Christians and Sister Sledge. The 2024 line-up features Sophie Ellis-Bextor, Busted, and Olly Murs.

In addition to numerous trade stands, club displays, live demonstrations, and family activities on the Village Green, car auctions are held at each year's event. Since 2011, the auctions have been run by Nick Whale's Iconic Auctioneers (previously known as Silverstone Auctions) with over £6m of sales in recent years.
