= Beat Zehnder =

Swiss mechanic

- Born: 9 January 1966 (age 60); Zürich, Switzerland
- Citizenship: Swiss
- Occupation: Engineer
- Years active: 1993–Present
- Employer: Sauber
- Known for: Formula One mechanic and team manager
- Title: Director of Signature Programs and Operations

Beat Zehnder (born 9 January 1966) is a Swiss Formula One engineer. Since 2025, Zehnder has served as Director of Signature Programs and Operations at Sauber; having previously served as Sporting Director. Zehnder has been with the Swiss team since its inception in 1993, and had attended every single race until the 2025 Monaco Grand Prix

== Career ==
Beat Zehnder has been a part of the Sauber family since the 1980s. He started with the Swiss outfit as a mechanic in the early days of the team's partnership with Mercedes Benz, moving from the number two mechanic to the number one in the space of a year. When the team began to concentrate their efforts on launching their own F1 team, he moved across from the mechanics side to work on logistics. However, Zehnder was swiftly returned to his mechanics duties, becoming the team manager and chief mechanic in 1994.

In 1995, Peter Sauber asked Zehnder to concentrate exclusively on logistics and team management and thus he became the team manager, which he held till October 2024, albeit in an evolved form as Sporting Director at the renamed Alfa Romeo Racing. During his time as Sporting Director, Zehnder represented the team in discussions with the FIA and sporting working group as well as managing logistics and garage operations. Throughout his time at the Swiss team, Zehnder has mentored many drivers such as Kimi Raikkonen, Felipe Massa, Sebastian Vettel, Robert Kubica and Charles Leclerc.

On 30 October 2024, it was announced that Zehnder would be shifted to the position of 'Director of Signature Programmes and Operation which thus meant that he was not required to attend every race subsequently in his new role. His streak of 601 races attended came to an end at Monaco where he subsequently shifted to a factory-based role with the focus on expanding the team's facilities and building a test squad.

== Personal life ==
Zehnder is married to Nadine Imboden. The couple were married on 31 December 2006.
