= Sauber Motorsport =

Swiss motorsport engineering company

Coordinates: 47.3085163°N 8.8172027°E

Sauber Motorsport AG
- Formerly: PP Sauber AG; Red Bull Sauber AG; BMW Sauber AG
- Type: Private
- Industry: Motorsport
- Founded: 15 May 1970
- Founder: Peter Sauber
- Defunct: 7 December 2025
- Fate: Acquired by Audi in 2024, subsequently became Audi's factory team in Formula One from 2026 onwards
- Successor: Audi Motorsport AG
- Headquarters: Hinwil, canton of Zürich, Switzerland
- Key people: Gernot Döllner (Chairman); Mattia Binotto (CEO); Jonathan Wheatley (Team Principal)
- Owners: Audi AG (70%); QIA (30%)

Sauber
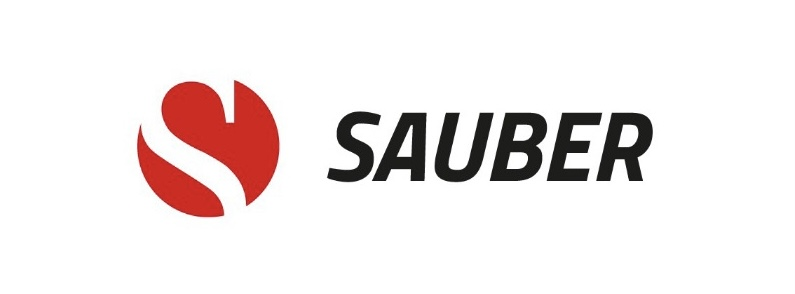
- Full name: Sauber F1 Team (1993–2005; 2010–2018); Stake F1 Team Kick Sauber (2024–2025)
- Base: Hinwil, Zürich, Switzerland; Bicester, United Kingdom (Technology Centre - 2025)
- Founder(s): Peter Sauber
- Noted staff: Mattia Binotto; Ruth Buscombe; Giampaolo Dall'Ara; Jacky Eeckelaert; Luca Furbatto; Mike Gascoyne; Monisha Kaltenborn; James Key; Mike Krack; Jan Monchaux; Francesco Nenci; Steve Nichols; Harvey Postlethwaite; Xevi Pujolar; Willy Rampf; Simone Resta; Loïc Serra; Julien Simon-Chautemps; Mark Smith; Stefano Sordo; Willem Toet; Frédéric Vasseur; Pierre Waché; Ben Waterhouse; Jonathan Wheatley; Jörg Zander; Beat Zehnder
- Noted drivers: (France) Jean Alesi (Finland) Valtteri Bottas (Brazil) Gabriel Bortoleto (Sweden) Marcus Ericsson (Brazil) Felipe Massa (Brazil) Felipe Nasr (Germany) Heinz-Harald Frentzen (Germany) Nick Heidfeld (United Kingdom) Johnny Herbert (Germany) Nico Hülkenberg (Italy) Antonio Giovinazzi (Mexico) Esteban Gutiérrez (Japan) Kamui Kobayashi (Poland) Robert Kubica (Monaco) Charles Leclerc (Spain) Pedro de la Rosa (Mexico) Sergio Pérez (Finland) Kimi Räikkönen (Germany) Pascal Wehrlein (Austria) Karl Wendlinger (Canada) Jacques Villeneuve (Germany) Sebastian Vettel (China) Guanyu Zhou
- Previous name: BMW Sauber; Alfa Romeo
- Next name: Audi

Formula One World Championship career
- First entry: 1993 South African Grand Prix
- Last entry: 2025 Abu Dhabi Grand Prix
- Races entered: 513 (510 starts) (Note: The total tally includes 70 races in which the team competed as BMW Sauber and 48 races in which the team competed as Kick Sauber. It does not include 104 races in which the team competed as Alfa Romeo.)
- Engines: Sauber, Mercedes, Ford, Petronas, BMW, Ferrari
- Constructors' Championships: 0
- Drivers' Championships: 0
- Race victories: 1 (Note: The team won its only race as BMW Sauber.)
- Podiums: 28 (Note: The total tally includes 17 podiums achieved as BMW Sauber.)
- Points: 939 (Note: The total tally includes points achieved as BMW Sauber.)
- Pole positions: 1 (Note: The team achieved its only pole position as BMW Sauber.)
- Fastest laps: 5 (Note: The total tally includes 2 fastest laps achieved as BMW Sauber.)
- 2025 position: 9th (70 pts)

Sauber Motorsport AG was a Swiss motorsport engineering company and race team. Founded by Peter Sauber as PP Sauber AG in 1970, the team produced sports cars and later Formula One race cars as an independent constructor. In endurance racing, the team achieved two world championships and overall victory at the 1989 24 Hours of Le Mans with Mercedes-Benz. After entering Formula One in 1993, the team transformed multiple times but exited the sport in 2025 as the fourth-oldest constructor in history by races started. The team and its assets were acquired by Audi AG in 2024 to form the chassis construction and sporting basis of the Audi F1 Team.

Each of the team's cars, with the exception of cars built by BMW Sauber, were designated a number proceeded by the letter C to honor Peter Sauber's wife, Christiane. Starting with the C1, which was built in his parents' garage, Sauber's early cars competed in local Swiss championships. The team debuted in FIA competition with the Sauber C5, which competed in the 1977 24 Hour of Le Mans. Sauber also won the 1979 Swiss Formula Three Championship. Its most successful sports car, the Sauber C9, won two consecutive world endurance championships and brought Mercedes back to the World Sportscar Championship as Team Sauber Mercedes.

After Group C endurance regulations ended, the team entered Formula One independently despite a failed attempt to build a joint project with Mercedes. From 1993 to 2005 the team operated as a private constructor, becoming well known for introducing young talent including Heinz Harald-Frentzen, Kimi Räikkönen, and Felipe Massa. Sauber also pioneered many technological innovations which later became standards, such as high cockpit side walls, longitudinally-mounted gearboxes, and the twin keel front suspension.

Sauber was purchased by BMW in 2005 and raced as BMW Sauber F1 Team from 2006 to 2009. The team achieved its best Formula One results during this period, most notably winning the 2008 Canadian Grand Prix and finishing second in the 2007 World Constructor's Championship. However, the global financial crisis forced BMW to sell the team after the 2009 season, after which Peter Sauber reacquired his eponymous team for one euro.

As an independent constructor again from 2010 to 2025, the team purchased customer Ferrari power but struggled financially. Peter Sauber sold his controlling stake in the team to Finn Rausing in 2016, who reorganized the team's leadership and cancelled the team's confirmed engine switch to Honda. In 2018 the team signed a title sponsorship agreement with Alfa Romeo, and Sauber raced as Alfa Romeo Racing and later as Alfa Romeo F1 Team until 2023. The team was purchased by Audi AG in 2024 with the intention of transforming Sauber into Audi's manufacturer entry for 2026. In its final two seasons, the team competed as Stake F1 Team Kick Sauber or Kick Sauber based on local gambling sponsorship laws.

== Sports car racing ==
Peter Sauber built the C1 in his parents' garage to compete in the 1970 Swiss Sports Car Championship. The open-cockpit tubular chassis was powered by a 1.0L Cosworth engine. The C2 iterated on this original design, increasing engine power to 1.6L and taking Sauber's first three race wins in domestic hillclimbing. The 2.0L Cosworth-powered C4 introduced Sauber to continental competition, winning one race in the 1975 European 2-Litre Sportscar Championship. The C5 was designed for the step up to Le Mans for 1977, and it led the Group 6 class before retiring in both 1977 and 1978. The C5 did deliver Sauber's first championship, however, winning the 1976 Interserie Championship with Swiss driver Herbert Müller.

After a one year racing hiatus as a Lola F2 chassis builder, Sauber entered two cars in the 1980 BMW M1 Procar Championship. At the time, Procar supported Formula One race weekends during the European season and enabled BMW's embattled M1 cars to race despite Group 5 homologation issues. Sauber was moderately successful in Procar, achieving three consecutive pole positions with Marc Surer and Manfred Schurti in the middle of the season. When the series folded after 1980, Sauber heavily modified its cars to comply with the more powerful Group 5 regulations. With a radically redesigned frame and substantially less weight, the BMW M1 Sauber won the 1981 Nürburgring 1000km with Hans-Joachim Stuck and Nelson Piquet.

Sauber then stepped up to Group C prototype racing, which replaced Group 5 as the highest category of endurance racing in the World Sportscar Championship. The team's first top-category prototype, the Sauber SHS C6, was designed in partnership with Swiss firm Seger & Hoffmann. The car's distinctive 'whale tail' rear wing and the BMW M88 power unit delivered Sauber a fifth place finish in the 1982 World Sportscar Championship for Manufacturers, after which the two chassis were retired and sold. The C7 was built as an iteration of the SHS C6, debuting at the 1983 24 Hours of Le Mans and finishing ninth overall. The C7 famously disrupted Porsche's otherwise undisputed top-ten dominance in the overall standings with the Porsche 956, which later became immortalized in Porsche's 'Nobody's perfect' advertisement.

After Mercedes-Benz expressed an interest in returning to sports car racing, Sauber quickly retired the BMW-powered C7 and adapted the chassis to take the Mercedes M117 turbocharged V8 power unit. Under an engine supplier partnership, the team raced the Sauber C8 as Kouros Racing Team under a title sponsorship deal with Yves Saint-Laurent. In 1985 the team failed to finish at Le Mans, but the C8 won the 1986 Nürburgring 1000km with Henri Pescarolo and Mike Thackwell in front of Mercedes executives. The C9 was built around the upgraded Mercedes M119HL engine and raced for Sauber/Kouros in 1987, where it struggled with reliability but set a Le Mans lap record with Johnny Dumfries behind the wheel. In 1988 Mercedes finally gave the project full factory support and the team became known as Team Sauber Mercedes.

Under the leadership of Jochen Neerpash and Max Welti as team directors, and with Mercedes subdivision AEG-Olympia as the new primary sponsor, the C9s took five wins in the 1988 World Sportscar Championship. Jean-Louis Schlesser, Jochen Mass, and Mauro Baldi drove C9 No. 61 to victory in the season-opening 800km of Jerez, but the team finished second in the championship in a strong fight against Jaguar and its XJR-9. Unfortunately, the team lost its most points when it was forced to withdraw its two cars from the 1988 24 Hours of Le Mans on safety grounds after two high-speed tyre blowouts in practice.

In the following two seasons the Swiss-German team won the 24 hours of Le Mans (in 1989) as well as the World Sports Prototype Championship (both in the 1989 season and 1990 season). Sauber dominated the 1989 World Sportscar Championship, winning all but one race and winning the World Sports Prototype Championship for Teams with nearly double the points of second-placed Joest Racing. Jean-Louis Schlesser won the driver's championship with five wins and led a Team Sauber Mercedes top-four lockout of the driver's standings. At Le Mans, Sauber locked out the front row and finished first, second, and fifth overall. The C11 was due to replace the C9 for the following season, but a longer development timeline required it to race the season opener for 1990. After a one-two finish proved the car's continued dominance, the C9 was finally retired.

In 1990, the team switched its race numbers from Nos. 61 and 62 to Nos. 1 and 2 on account of the previous year's success. Longtime team leader Beat Zehnder worked with Mercedes to introduce a Junior Team for 1990, and Sauber signed young drivers including Michael Schumacher, Karl Wendlinger, and Heinz-Harald Frentzen to drive the No. 2 car for the new season. Sauber dominated the championship again in 1990, winning all but one race for a second consecutive season and winning the 1990 Team's World Championship with over double the points of Silk Cut Jaguar. Jean-Louis Schlesser defended his driver's crown and was named co-champion on equal points with teammate Mauro Baldi. The junior drivers won two races in 1990, with Wendlinger joining Jochen Mass to win at Spa-Francorchamps and a season finale win for Schumacher at Mexico City. Notably, the team chose not to contest Le Mans in 1990 because it was designated a non-championship race for the World Sports Prototype Championship.

Sauber-Mercedes struggled to adapt to Group C's regulation changes for 1991, which abolished the existing engine rules and mandated 3.5L Formula One-style engines. The new C291 took the bespoke Mercedes M291 flat-12 engine, but it struggled heavily with reliability issues and raced alongside the prior year's C11 for much of the season. The team won only one race in 1991, slipping to a distant third in the team's championship as Jaguar returned to power. The team pushed ahead with a radical aerodynamic redesign for 1992 with the C292, but Mercedes pulled its support for the team on financial grounds during testing. The stillborn C292 never raced and Sauber withdrew its entry for the season. It remains unclear how many C292 chassis were produced and how many examples survive today.

== Formula One ==
=== Sauber (1993–2005) ===
==== Beginning and partnership with Mercedes-Benz (1993–1994) ====
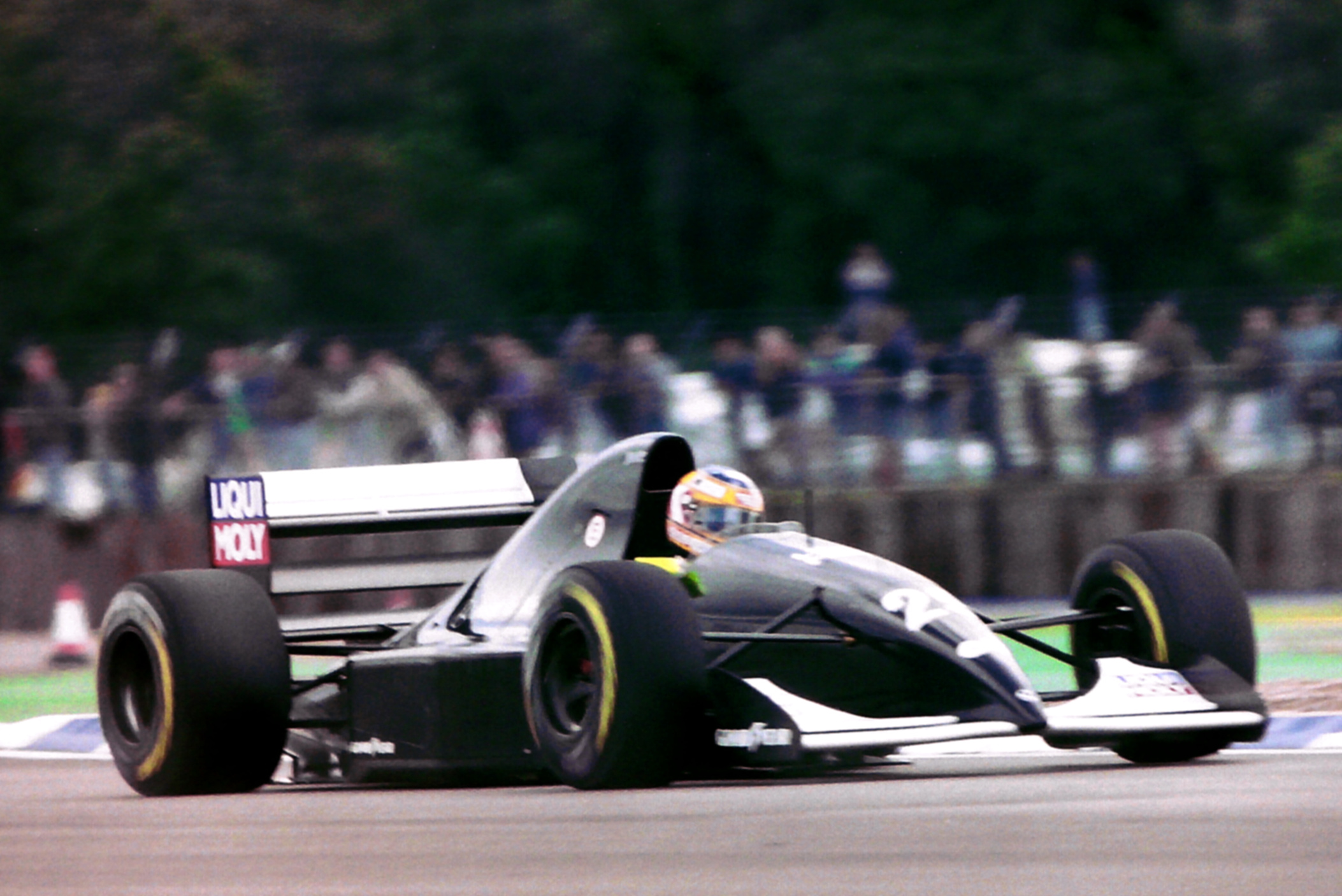
Sauber first Formula One car, the Sauber C12.

Sauber intended to pivot to Formula One in direct collaboration with Mercedes, but this joint project was shelved and Mercedes funded Sauber's first engine contract instead. The team re-branded Ilmor V10 engines as Sauber power units, and the new Sauber C12 spent most of 1992 testing across Europe at Lurcy-Levis, Barcelona-Catalunya, and even an airfield in Zweisimmen. The team signed experienced Formula One driver JJ Lehto to partner former Sauber endurance driver Karl Wendlinger for the 1993 season.

=== 1993 ===
On debut at the 1993 South African Grand Prix, Lehto qualified in sixth position and finished in fifth ahead of Gerhard Berger's Ferrari, achieving two points on debut in a race of attrition. The team struggled with engine reliability during the rest of the season but impressive points finishes at San Marino, Montreal, and Monza prompted Mercedes to place "concept by Mercedes-Benz" stickers on the engine cover of Sauber's cars for the remainder of the season. A seventh place finish in the 1993 World Constructors' Championship, ahead of independents including Minardi and Jordan, established Sauber as a credible entrant in an era of small and questionable back-marker teams.

=== 1994 ===
Mercedes joined the team as an official component in 1994, but the newly-renamed Sauber-Mercedes regressed to eighth in the championship amid struggles with Mercedes-branded Ilmor 3.5L V10 engines. New entrant Pacific Grand Prix received a customer supply of Sauber's older-specification engines from the previous season, but the team faced financial woes after title sponsor Broker was found to be fraudulent and did not pay its sponsorship obligations. To make matters worse, Wendlinger was seriously injured after a practice crash at the Monaco Grand Prix, which left him in a coma and required Andrea de Cesaris to step in as a relief driver. Sauber re-engineered its cars with high cockpit side walls after the crash, which later became mandatory in the wake of Wendlinger's crash and the deaths of Ayrton Senna and Roland Ratzenberger earlier that season.

With the same points tally as the previous year, Mercedes left the team at the end of the year and joined McLaren after it terminated its existing deal with Peugeot. As a result, Sauber inherited Benetton's works engine deal with Ford for 1995 after it switched to Renault power for the following season.

=== 1995 ===
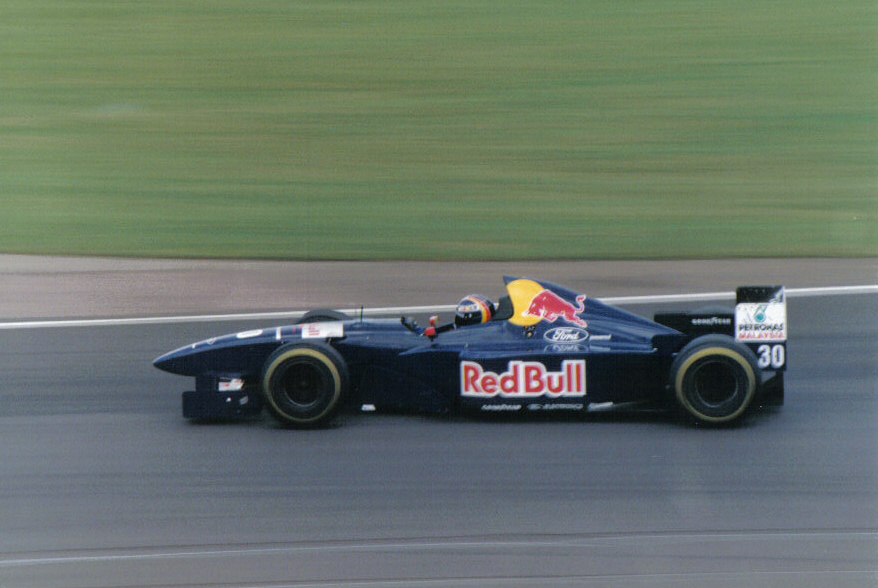
Frentzen driving the C14 at the 1995 British Grand Prix.

In conjunction with the Ford deal, Sauber signed a ten-year sponsorship deal with energy drink company Red Bull. Entrepreneur Dietrich Mateschitz purchased a majority share in the team and Fritz Kaiser joined as Sauber's new commercial director. Karl Wendlinger returned to the team alongside Heinz-Harald Frentzen, but Wendlinger was sacked in favor of Jean-Cristophe Bouillon after just four races. Frentzen led the team to its largest F1 tally with eighteen points and scored the team's first podium at the 1995 Italian Grand Prix with a third place finish. 1995 also marked the start of the team's long association with Petronas, who joined mid-season and later became a presenting sponsor until 2009.

=== 1996 ===
In 1996, the team regressed as it struggled with the uncompetitiveness of the new V10 Cosworth JD engine. Despite again holding seventh spot on a shrinking list of constructors, they scored only eleven points but finished third with Johnny Herbert at the 1996 Monaco Grand Prix. For the next season they announced a customer deal to receive Ferrari engines while working with new sponsors Petronas to bring licensing and manufacturing in-house.

==== Sauber-Petronas Engineering (1997–2005) ====
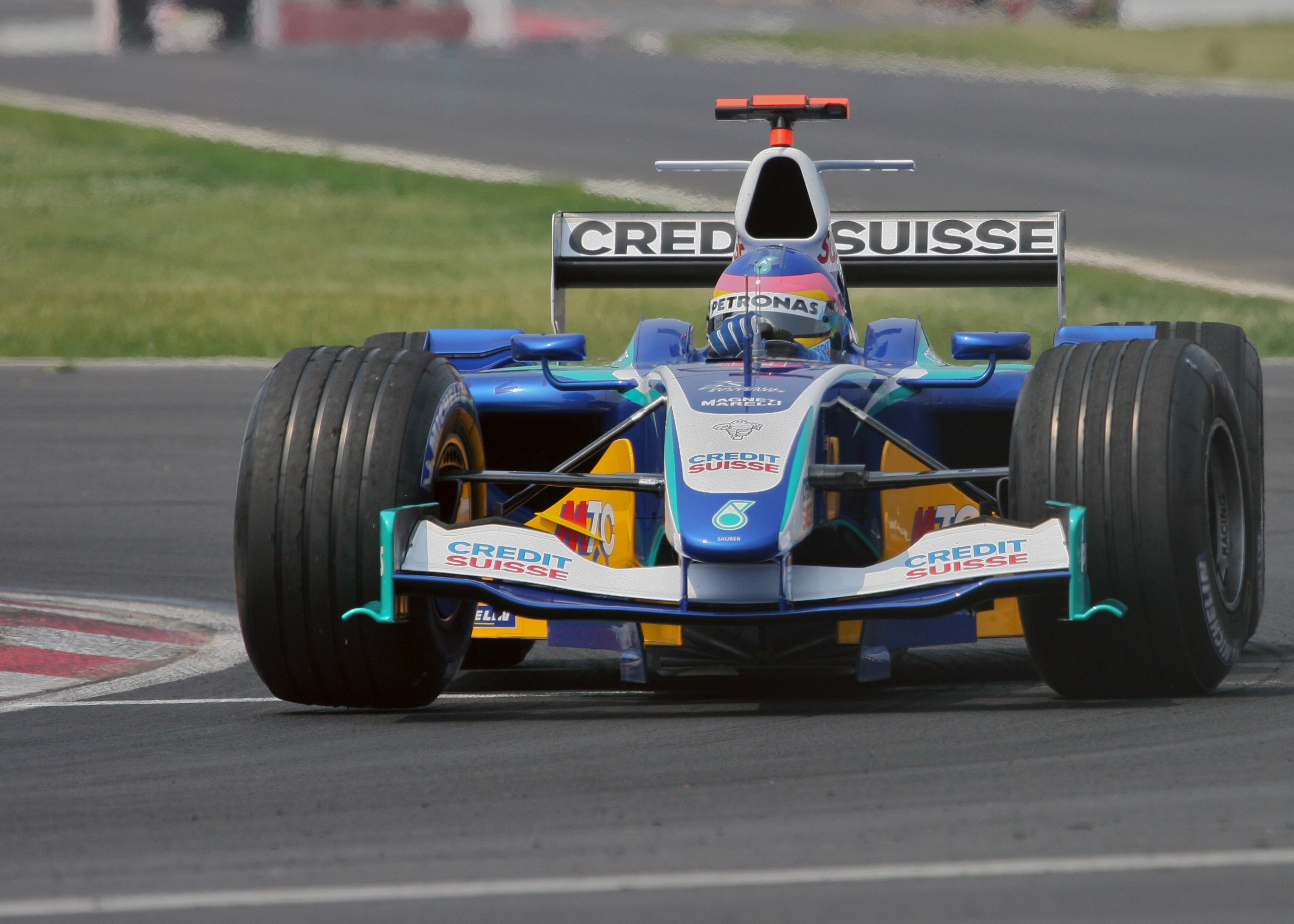
Jacques Villeneuve driving the C24 at the 2005 Canadian Grand Prix.

From 1997 until 2005 Sauber used Ferrari designed customer engines and gearboxes built by Sauber Petronas Engineering, a company founded for the sole purpose of building these engines. Sauber licensed nearly every legally licensable part from Ferrari and even had several Ferrari engineers on staff. The first podium for Sauber-Petronas came at the 1997 Hungarian Grand Prix with a third place finish, and a podium followed the next season with third at the 1998 Belgian Grand Prix. However, the team struggled in the lower midfield throughout 1999 and 2000 and achieved only six points at the turn of the millennium.

In 2001, Sauber brought a virtually unknown and very inexperienced Kimi Räikkönen into Formula One, despite the protests of a few drivers and influential members of the FIA, including Max Mosley, that he would pose a danger to other drivers. His performances that year, however, more than vindicated their decision (he would later go on to win the 2007 Drivers' Championship with Ferrari). It also caused Red Bull to sell their majority share in the team to Credit Suisse in protest (Red Bull wanted Enrique Bernoldi to take the seat but he wound up at Arrows). In 2004, Sauber spent a large sum of money on a new wind tunnel at Hinwil, and a high performance supercomputer (called Albert) to help refine the aerodynamics of their cars. The state-of-the-art infrastructure Sauber has built up is one aspect that attracted BMW Motorsport to Sauber.

In its later years, Sauber's links with Ferrari became weaker. They sided with the non-Ferrari teams over planned rule changes at the end of the 2004 season and also joined the GPWC. Then they decided to switch to Michelin tyres, while Ferrari continued to use Bridgestone tyres. Sauber had secured a deal with BMW for a supply of their engines from 2006, initially expected to be on a customer relationship but following BMW's decision to split from Williams at the end of 2005, BMW agreed to take ownership of the team from 1 January 2006, having bought Credit Suisse's shares in the team and thus Red Bull Racing took over Ferrari customer engine partnership. Sauber's final Grand Prix before BMW takeover was the 2005 Chinese Grand Prix, with Massa, in his final race for the team having been promoted to Ferrari for the 2006 season, scoring a welcome sixth place to round off the team's history. Sauber had finished its independent run in F1 with six third places and two front-row starts being their best results. Among notable Sauber drivers were Jean Alesi, 2008 Drivers' Championship runner-up Felipe Massa, Johnny Herbert, and 1997 World Champion Jacques Villeneuve. Two former Sauber drivers drove for the new BMW Sauber team in 2006: Nick Heidfeld who was a Sauber driver from 2001 to 2003, and Villeneuve who drove for the team in 2005.

=== BMW factory team (2006–2009) ===
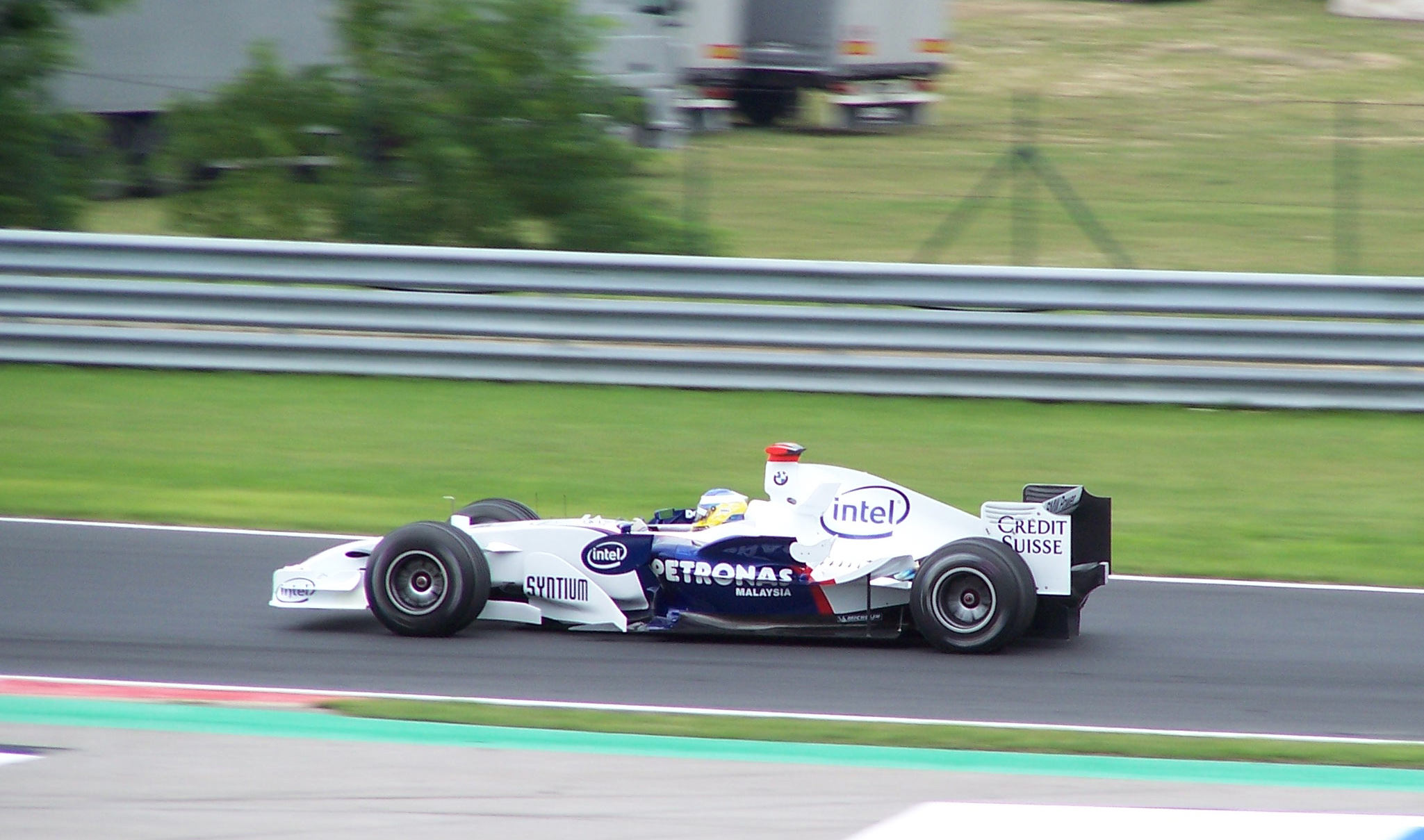
Nick Heidfeld took BMW's first podium finish at the 2006 Hungarian Grand Prix.

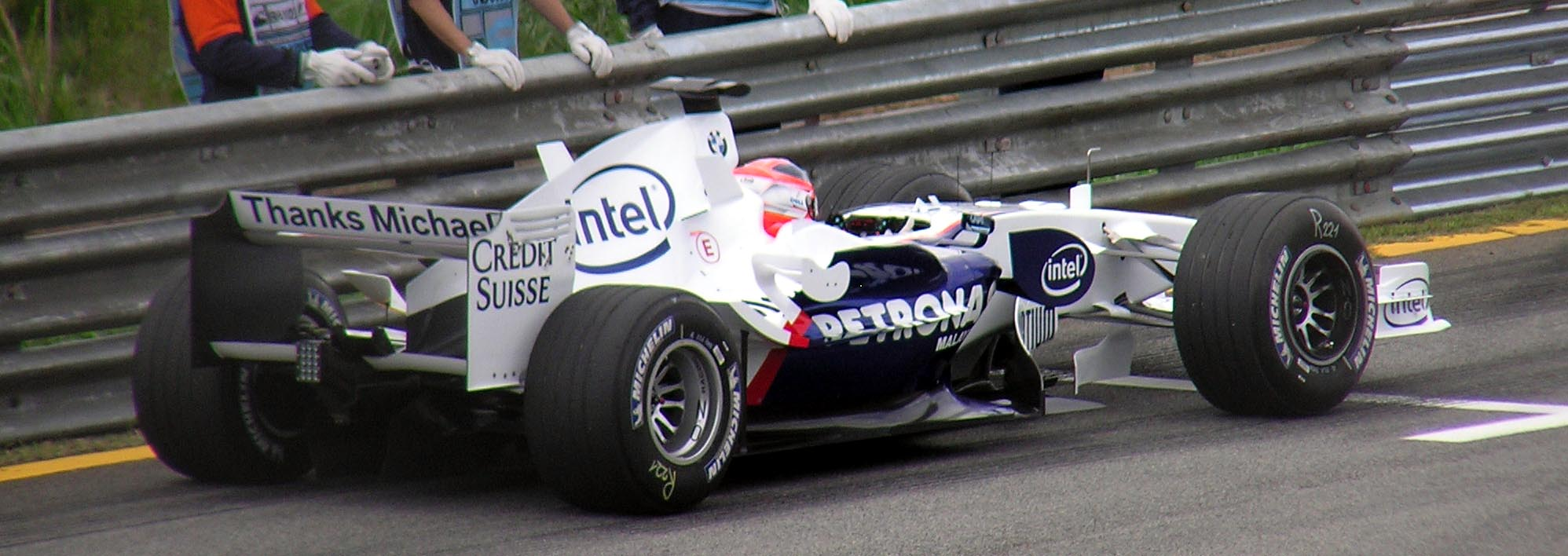
BMW Sauber put "Thanks Michael" messages on the back of their cars for what was then Michael Schumacher's last Grand Prix in Brazil.

At the end of the 2005 season, the team's majority shareholding previously owned by Credit Suisse was bought by BMW, with Peter Sauber retaining a 20% stake, and was renamed BMW Sauber. BMW sold its part back to Peter Sauber after the end of the 2009 season, but the team formally used the name BMW Sauber until the end of the 2010 season. The team held a German licence from 2006 to 2009, then reverted to a Swiss licence in 2010.

==== 2006 ====
For the 2006 season the team re-signed Nick Heidfeld from Williams to be their lead driver (Heidfeld drove for Sauber in 2001–2003), while 1997 World Champion Jacques Villeneuve had his existing Sauber contract confirmed. Pole Robert Kubica was signed as the team's third driver. The team continued to use Sauber's facilities, mostly for chassis construction and wind tunnel testing, while BMW's headquarters in Munich were responsible for building the new P86 V8 engine.

Former Sauber title sponsor Petronas renewed their contract with the new team after BMW Sauber snubbed BP-Castrol, despite them being BMW's official commercial gasoline and motor oil partner. Credit Suisse also continued their sponsorship. For the new season BMW Sauber announced a technical partnership with Intel and O2, claiming that it will eventually lead to technological improvements available on BMW road cars.

The new livery, unveiled in Valencia on 17 January 2006, was the traditional BMW M blue and white with red flashes.

Jacques Villeneuve scored the team's first points with a seventh-place finish at the 2006 Malaysian Grand Prix, after Heidfeld retired from fifth with an engine failure late in the race. Over the first two-thirds of the season the drivers picked up points with a succession of seventh- and eighth-place finishes.

The team ran a radical "twin towers" aero enhancement on the front of the car for the race in Magny-Cours, France, which was meant to direct airflow to the rear and thus improve performance. This unconventional add-on was promptly banned by the FIA as it was adjudged to impede the drivers' vision and thus compromise safety.

Heidfeld scored the team's first podium at the 2006 Hungarian Grand Prix from tenth on the grid. Kubica stood in for Villeneuve, BMW stating that Villeneuve could not drive due to medical complications following his accident at the German Grand Prix. Kubica finished seventh, although he was later disqualified for an underweight car. After the Hungarian Grand Prix, BMW announced that Kubica would complete the season for the Swiss team, spelling the end of former world champion Villeneuve's F1 career.

Kubica scored BMW Sauber's second podium of the season at the Italian Grand Prix, after running in third place for most of the race and leading briefly during the first round of pit stops. Heidfeld struggled in the race and barely earned a point by finishing eighth. The team's fifth place in the Constructors' Championship was cemented by Heidfeld's two further points at the 2006 Chinese Grand Prix, and Toyota's early double retirement from the 2006 Brazilian Grand Prix.

==== 2007 ====
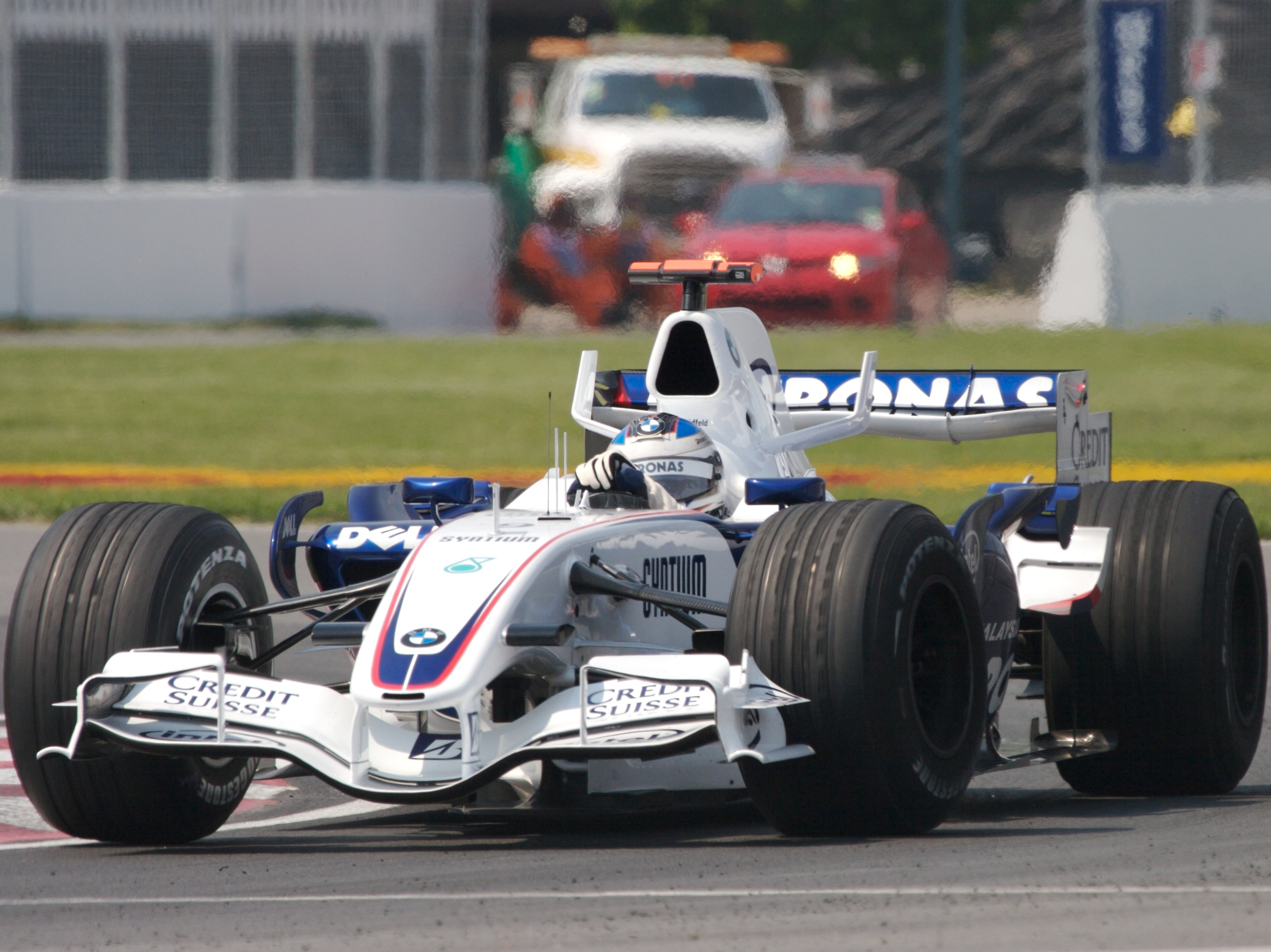
Nick Heidfeld took BMW Sauber's best result of 2007 with second place at the Canadian Grand Prix.

On 19 October 2006, it was announced that Robert Kubica would partner Nick Heidfeld for the 2007 season with Sebastian Vettel taking the test and reserve driver role. On 21 December, it was announced that Timo Glock had been signed as the team's second test driver. The team launched their 2007 car, the F1.07, on 16 January 2007.

The new car showed promising form throughout the winter testing, topping the times sheets on occasions. However, team principal Mario Theissen declared some reliability concerns before the season's opening race in Melbourne. Kubica duly retired from fourth place mid-race with gearbox trouble, but Nick Heidfeld proved their pace in winter testing was no fluke as he raced to fourth place. Heidfeld continued this success with two more fourth places in Malaysia and Bahrain respectively. Kubica finished sixth in Bahrain after retiring in Australia and mechanical trouble in Malaysia.

Their performance thus far had been such that many were saying a race win was likely after firmly establishing themselves as the best team behind championship leaders Ferrari and McLaren. Although the perceived performance gap between the two leaders and BMW Sauber was a fair amount, it was still less than that between BMW Sauber and the teams behind them.

The Canadian Grand Prix brought mixed fortunes for the team. While Nick Heidfeld scored a second-place finish, Robert Kubica suffered a huge crash that resulted in a long safety car period. The media was initially told Kubica had broken his leg, but it later emerged that he had escaped with only a sprained ankle and concussion.

Sebastian Vettel took his place in the US Grand Prix, finishing in eighth place and therefore becoming the youngest driver to score a Formula One World Championship point. After the European GP, however, it was announced by Scuderia Toro Rosso that Vettel would take the second driver seat from Scott Speed.

==== 2008 ====
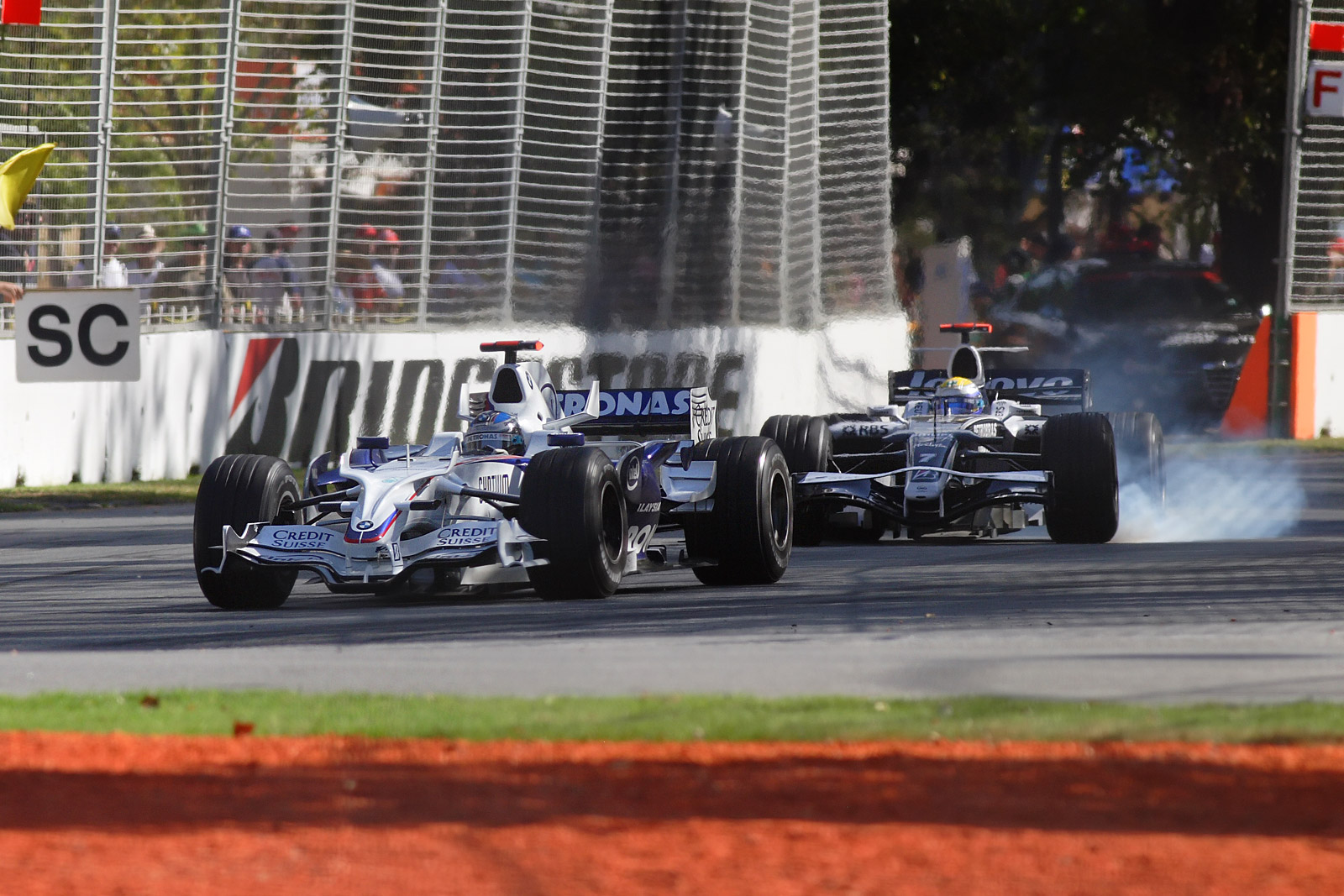
BMW Sauber took a podium finish in the first race of the 2008 season, courtesy of Nick Heidfeld.

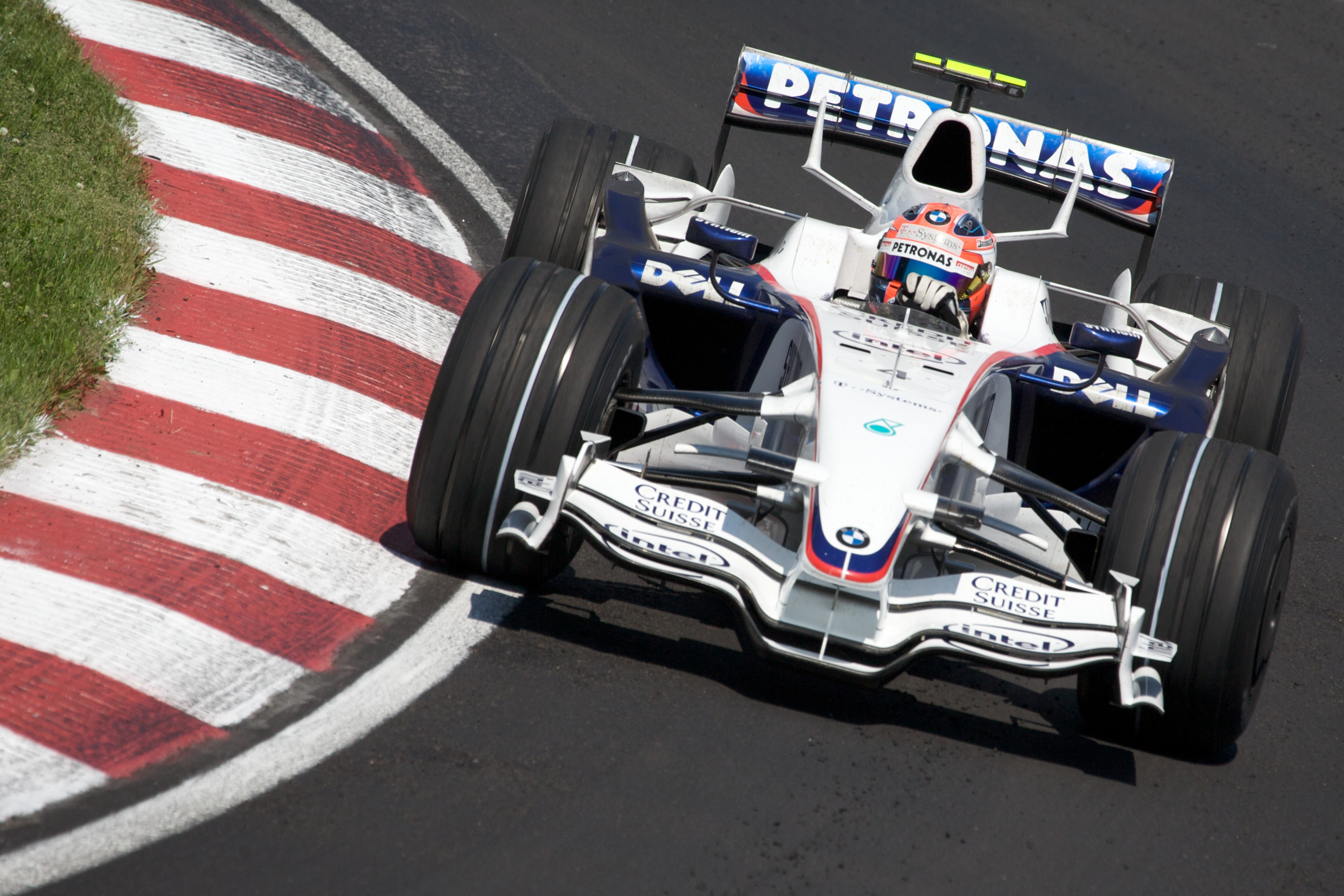
The 2008 Canadian Grand Prix saw Robert Kubica win his and BMW Sauber's only race.

On 21 August 2007, BMW confirmed its driver line-up of Heidfeld and Kubica for the 2008 season. Their 2008 car, the F1.08 was officially launched in Munich at BMW Welt on 14 January 2008. It made its track debut at Valencia the next day, with Robert Kubica driving.

The BMW Sauber team also introduced a new scheme for the team as a whole, with every individual getting "fit for pole", from the boss to the cleaners, meaning that the team would be in optimum fitness for the 2008 season. Team principal Mario Theissen targeted the team's first Formula 1 victory for 2008.

BMW Sauber started the season well with Kubica narrowly missing out on pole after a mistake in his main qualifying lap in Melbourne. He later retired after being hit by Kazuki Nakajima but Heidfeld finished second. Kubica took second in Malaysia, with Heidfeld in sixth setting the fastest lap of the race. The team's points total of 11 was their largest score up to that time. In Bahrain, Kubica scored his and the team's first ever pole position, beating Felipe Massa by just under three hundredths of a second. The team went on to finish third and fourth in the race, equalling their highest round points total and promoting them to first place in the Constructors' Championship for the first time.

The team also attained a second-place finish in the Monaco Grand Prix with Robert Kubica, beating both Ferraris and only trailing the McLaren of Lewis Hamilton by three seconds.

BMW Sauber's first race victory came in the 2008 Canadian Grand Prix, the team achieving a one-two finish with Robert Kubica's first race win and Nick Heidfeld taking second place. The victory came after Lewis Hamilton collided with Kimi Räikkönen in the pitlane, ending the race for both drivers. Kubica was on a different refuelling strategy from Heidfeld, who also briefly led the race before securing the one-two finish for BMW Sauber in comfortable fashion. This was the first Formula One victory for a BMW engine since the 2004 Brazilian Grand Prix.

After the team's breakthrough win, development was switched to the 2009 season where new regulations come into play. This greatly annoyed Kubica, (who was leading the championship after the Canadian Grand Prix), as he felt they could have had a realistic chance of taking at least one title. The lack of development was reflected with a drop of form throughout the second half of the season, causing BMW to be outpaced by Renault, Toyota and even Toro Rosso (who started the season as one of the slowest teams) by the end of the season. Despite this, Kubica remained with an outside chance of taking the Drivers' Championship until the Chinese Grand Prix, the 17th round out of 18.

==== 2009 ====
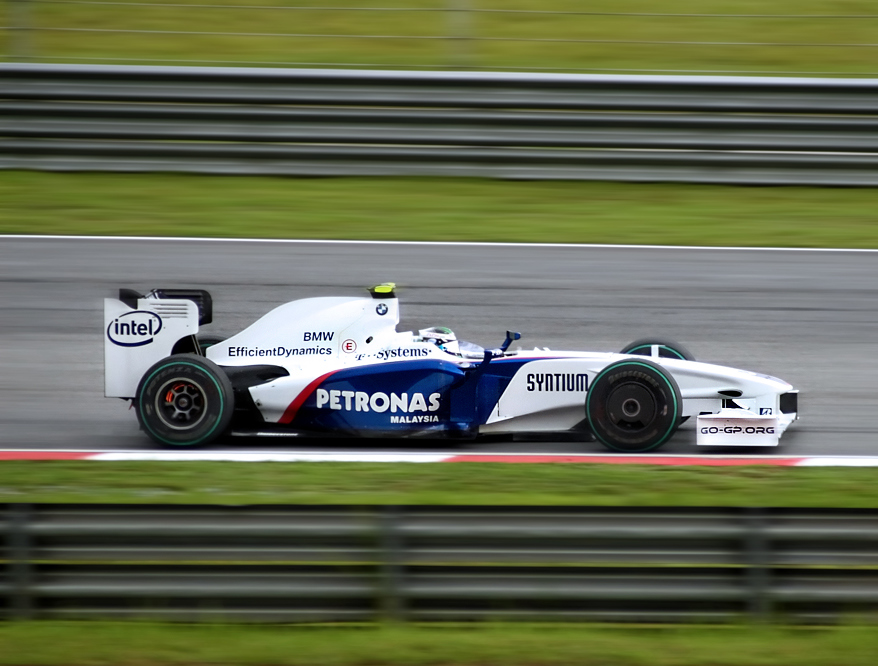
In a disappointing final year for BMW, Nick Heidfeld took the first of the team's two podiums during the season at the 2009 Malaysian Grand Prix.

In October 2008, the team confirmed that they would stick with Robert Kubica and Nick Heidfeld as their drivers for the 2009 season.

Although BMW Sauber targeted the 2009 season as the year they would challenge for the title, their start to the season was a disappointment. Kubica was in third place in the opening round, when he collided with Vettel while battling for second place and was forced to retire. Heidfeld then secured the team's first podium of the year in Malaysia, but after six races BMW Sauber had collected a mere six points, and occupied eighth place in the Constructors' Championship out of ten teams. A raft of upgrades were set for Turkey, including an improved regenerative braking system (KERS) and a double deck diffuser. While the new diffuser was implemented, the KERS could not be made to fit the new car and both drivers raced without the device. After the qualifying session for the British Grand Prix Mario Theissen announced that the team had decided to halt further development of KERS; of which BMW had been one of the strongest proponents, and focus instead on improving the car's aerodynamics. This left Ferrari and McLaren as the only remaining users of the KERS system. In the European Grand Prix at Valencia, Kubica scored the team's first points since the race in Turkey.

Following a meeting of the BMW board on 28 July, the company held a press conference the following morning in which it confirmed the team's withdrawal from Formula One at the end of 2009. Chairman Dr. Norbert Reithofer described the decision as a strategic one. The Formula One Teams Association released a statement in response pledging its support to help the team remain in F1.

On 15 September 2009, it was announced that BMW Sauber had secured a buyer, Qadbak Investments Limited which turned out to be a shell company. However, Lotus Racing had been given the 13th and final slot in the 2010 season. The team were awarded what was termed a 14th entry, which hinged either on another team dropping out or all the other teams agreeing to allow 28 cars to enter the 2010 Championship.

=== Sauber (2010–2018) ===
==== Independent return with Ferrari engines (2010–2017) ====
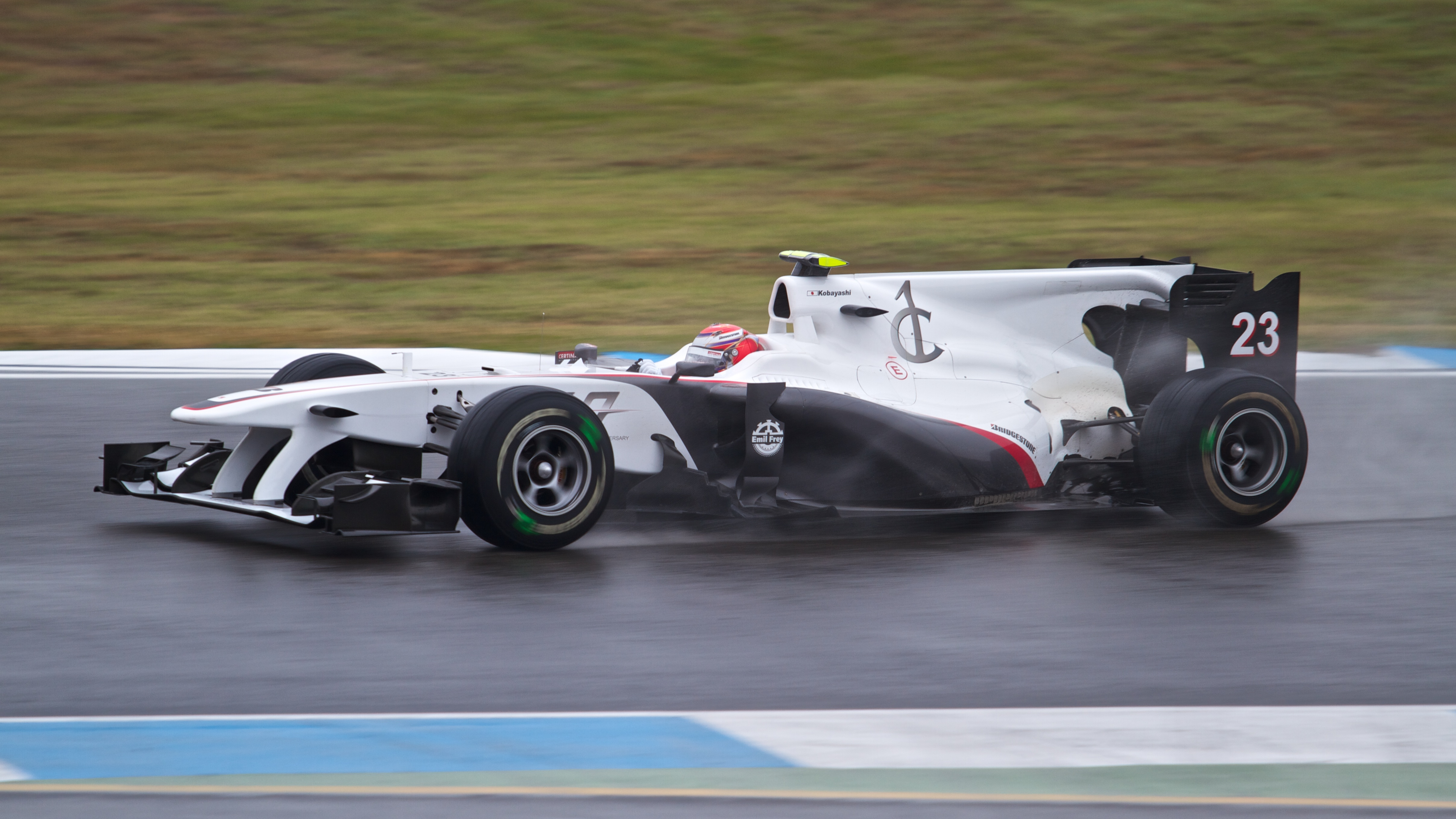
Kamui Kobayashi racing during the 2010 German Grand Prix

2010

On 27 November 2009, it was announced that Peter Sauber would repurchase the team conditional upon the team receiving a FIA entry for the 2010 season.

On 3 December 2009, the FIA confirmed that Sauber had been granted the entry vacated by Toyota Racing following their withdrawal and would be using Ferrari engines. Peter Sauber had previously announced, on 29 November, that the team's chassis for the 2010 season would be designated Sauber C29, while the Swiss newspaper Blick reported that the team will be called Team Sauber F1. However, in January 2010, Peter Sauber had said that he had not yet applied for a change of name, so therefore they remained for the season as BMW Sauber F1 Team despite zero BMW components. Kamui Kobayashi was announced as their first signed driver for the 2010 season on 17 December 2009. Pedro de la Rosa was signed as Sauber's second driver on 19 January 2010.

Before the Singapore Grand Prix, it was announced that Nick Heidfeld would replace de la Rosa for the remaining five races of the season. Esteban Gutiérrez later joined the team as a reserve driver, and drove during young drivers' testing after the end of the season.

Despite promising pace in winter testing, the team struggled with technical problems in the early rounds of the season, with no points from the first six races. After running a blank livery for the first four races of the 2010 season, the team finally announced a sponsorship deal with the Burger King fast food franchise at the Spanish and European Grands Prix. During frustrations, Peter Sauber admitted that his decision to rescue the team had been emotionally driven, but insisted that it was proper. Finally, in Turkey, Kobayashi finished tenth, collecting the team's first championship point for the season.

At the European Grand Prix in Valencia, after qualifying in 18th place, Kobayashi spent a vast proportion of the race in third position defending from Jenson Button who was following closely behind in fourth. After entering the pits during the closing stages of the race to switch tyres, Kobayashi exited the pit in ninth. In the last few laps of the race, Kobayashi overtook the Ferrari of Fernando Alonso and the Toro Rosso of Sébastien Buemi for a seventh-place finish. The impressive drive from Kobayashi received much acclaim and was Sauber's best result of the season to-date. Pedro de la Rosa meanwhile, despite originally crossing the line in tenth position to secure 1 point, was relegated to 12th place after a penalty, stripping away a double points finish. Both drivers went on to score points at the Japanese Grand Prix and Korean Grand Prix.

The second half of the season gave more productive and consistent results; The drives of Kobayashi, Heidfeld and de la Rosa combined earned 44 points, giving the team eighth place in the Constructors' Championship. Kobayashi performed the team's season-best finish of sixth at the British Grand Prix.

2011

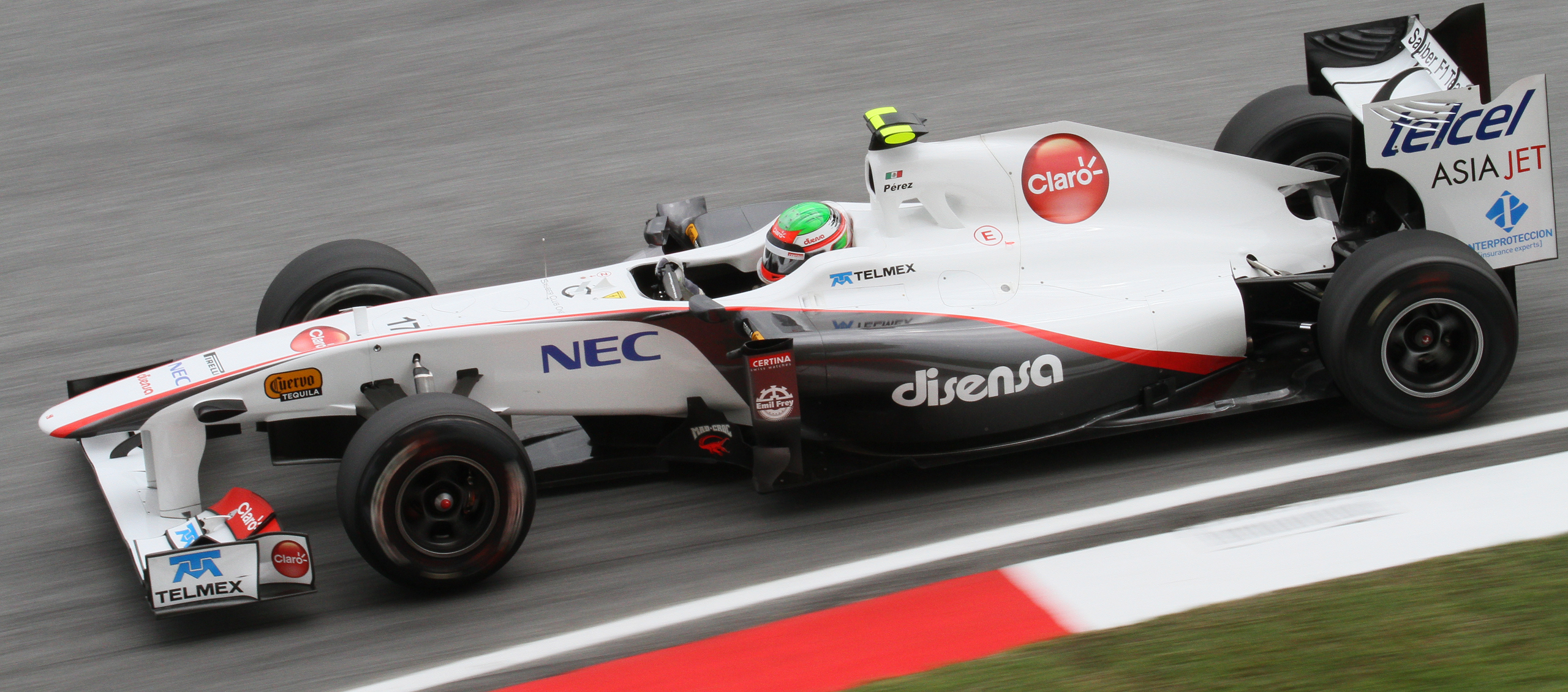
Sergio Pérez at the 2011 Malaysian Grand Prix

Kobayashi was retained for 2011; he was joined by teammate Sergio Pérez and his compatriot Esteban Gutiérrez as reserve driver. The team debuted their 2011 car – the C30 – on 31 January, with testing beginning the following day.

At the start of the season in Australia, both Pérez and Kobayashi were later disqualified due to technical infringements. Pérez suffered a major collision at the Monaco Grand Prix, resulting in concussion and a sprained thigh. Despite being passed fit for the Canadian Grand Prix, Pérez withdrew from the weekend after the first free practice session due to illness, he was replaced by 2010 Sauber driver Pedro de la Rosa for the remainder of the weekend.

For the remainder of the season, the team obtained regular top-10 finishes, and overall finished seventh in the Constructors' Championship.

On 28 July, it was announced that Kobayashi, Pérez and Gutiérrez would all remain in the Sauber setup for the 2012 season.

2012

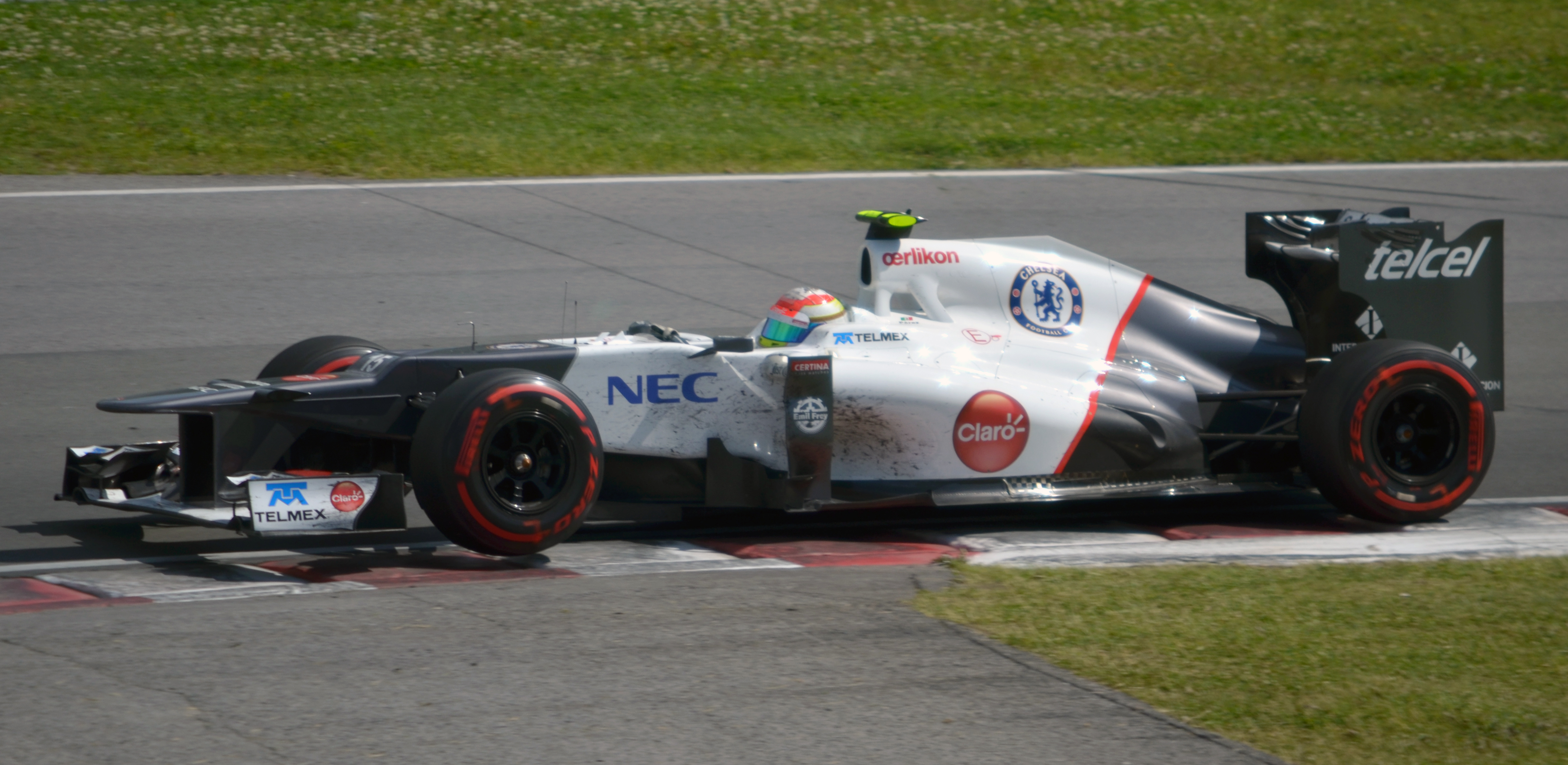
Sergio Pérez at the 2012 Canadian Grand Prix

Sauber started the 2012 season with a double points-scoring finish – Kobayashi sixth and Pérez eighth – in Australia, before Pérez finished second the following week, at the Malaysian Grand Prix; the team's best result as an independent team. Kobayashi then started third at the Chinese Grand Prix behind the two Mercedes cars of Nico Rosberg and Michael Schumacher; although Kobayashi finished the race in tenth position, he recorded the fastest lap of the race, his first in Formula One.

Prior to the Spanish Grand Prix, Sauber announced a sponsorship deal with English Premier League team Chelsea. After the race, in which Kobayashi equalled his career-best result of fifth, Peter Sauber announced that he had transferred ownership of a third of the team to CEO Monisha Kaltenborn. Pérez achieved his second podium of the season at the Canadian Grand Prix with third place, while Kobayashi added a ninth place to help Sauber move up to sixth place in the Constructors' Championship.

For the German Grand Prix, Sauber achieved their best result of the season. After starting in twelfth position, Kobayashi finished fifth, equalling his best result at the time, before a time penalty for Sebastian Vettel pushed him up into fourth, giving him the best result of his career. Meanwhile, after starting down in 17th due to a penalty, Pérez managed to work a great tyre strategy and finished just behind Kobayashi – prior to Vettel's penalty – in sixth position, giving the team a total points haul of 20, their best since splitting with BMW, and giving them a 53-point advantage over Williams for sixth in the Constructors' Championship. At the Belgian Grand Prix, Kobayashi started second and Pérez fourth, the best grid positions in Sauber's history. At the start of the race, Romain Grosjean caused a spectacular crash taking himself, Pérez, championship leader Fernando Alonso and Lewis Hamilton out of the race. Kobayashi's Sauber was also damaged and he finished the race in 13th place.

At the Italian Grand Prix, Sauber scored 20 points; Pérez used a one-stop strategy to move from twelfth on the grid to take his third podium of the season with second place, while Kobayashi finished in ninth place. Kobayashi took his first podium finish and the team's fourth of the season at the Japanese Grand Prix; the following week, it was announced that Peter Sauber was stepping back from the daily management of his team, handing the role of team principal to Kaltenborn.

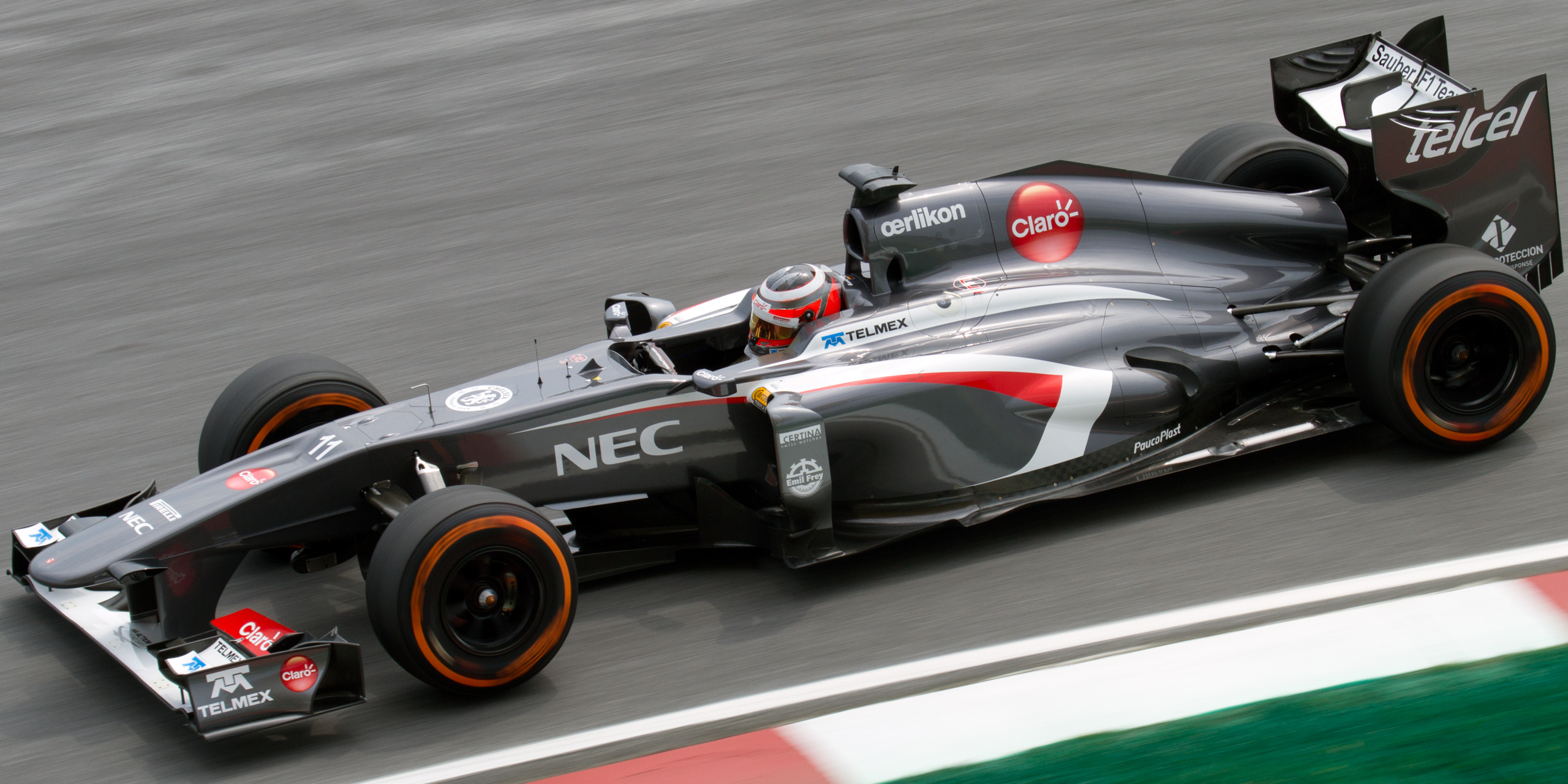
Nico Hülkenberg racing during the 2013 Malaysian Grand Prix

2013

On 23 November 2012, it was announced that Nico Hülkenberg, Esteban Gutiérrez and Robin Frijns would make up the team's line-up for the 2013 season; Hülkenberg and Gutiérrez as part of the race team and Frijns as reserve driver. The team's car for the season, the C32, was launched in Hinwil on 2 February 2013. The livery was changed and the car is now grey, similar to the Sauber cars in the early 1990s. Despite a promising eighth place for Hülkenberg at the second round of the season, the Malaysian Grand Prix, it was clear soon that the C32 was far from the competitiveness shown by its predecessor, with Hülkenberg unable to obtain better than a tenth-place finish in subsequent races and rookie Gutiérrez having been unable to score as of the Belgian Grand Prix. Despite this, Hülkenberg caused a shock by putting his car third on the grid for the Italian Grand Prix, outqualifying both Ferraris in the process.

On 15 July 2013, Sergey Sirotkin joined Sauber as a development driver as part of a tie-in with Russian investors with a view to promoting him to a race seat as early as 2014.

At the Singapore Grand Prix both Hülkenberg and Gutiérrez were in the points, running sixth and seventh respectively due to pitting under the safety car, but as their tyres went away Hülkenberg managed ninth place and Gutiérrez only 12th. Hülkenberg showed some impressive driving in Korea, finishing in fourth place and allowing Sauber to pass Toro Rosso in the standings. The Japanese Grand Prix saw the team's first double points finish of the 2013 season with Hülkenberg sixth after running most of the race in fourth, and Gutiérrez seventh after an impressive battle with Nico Rosberg's Mercedes. Hülkenberg scored again in the last two rounds and Sauber finished seventh in the WCC with 57 points.

2014

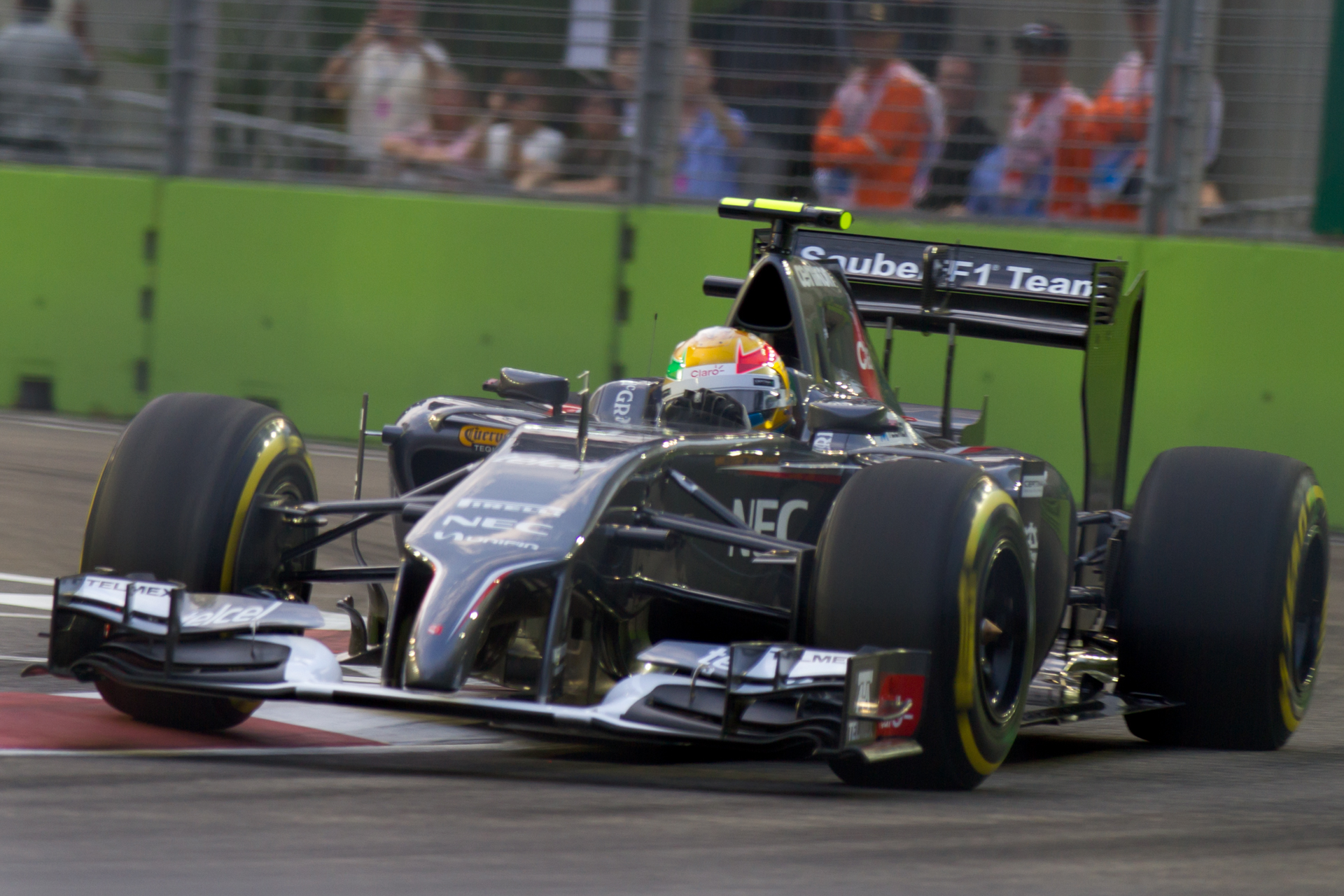
Esteban Gutiérrez at the 2014 Singapore Grand Prix

In February 2014, IndyCar Series driver Simona de Silvestro was signed by Sauber as an "affiliated driver", with the intent of racing in F1 by 2015. However, by the end of 2014, de Silvestro was no longer part of the team. For the 2014 season, Gutiérrez was retained and joined by Adrian Sutil, following Hülkenberg's decision to return to Force India. The team struggled throughout the season, often going out in the first round of qualifying and failing to score a single point for the first time in team history.

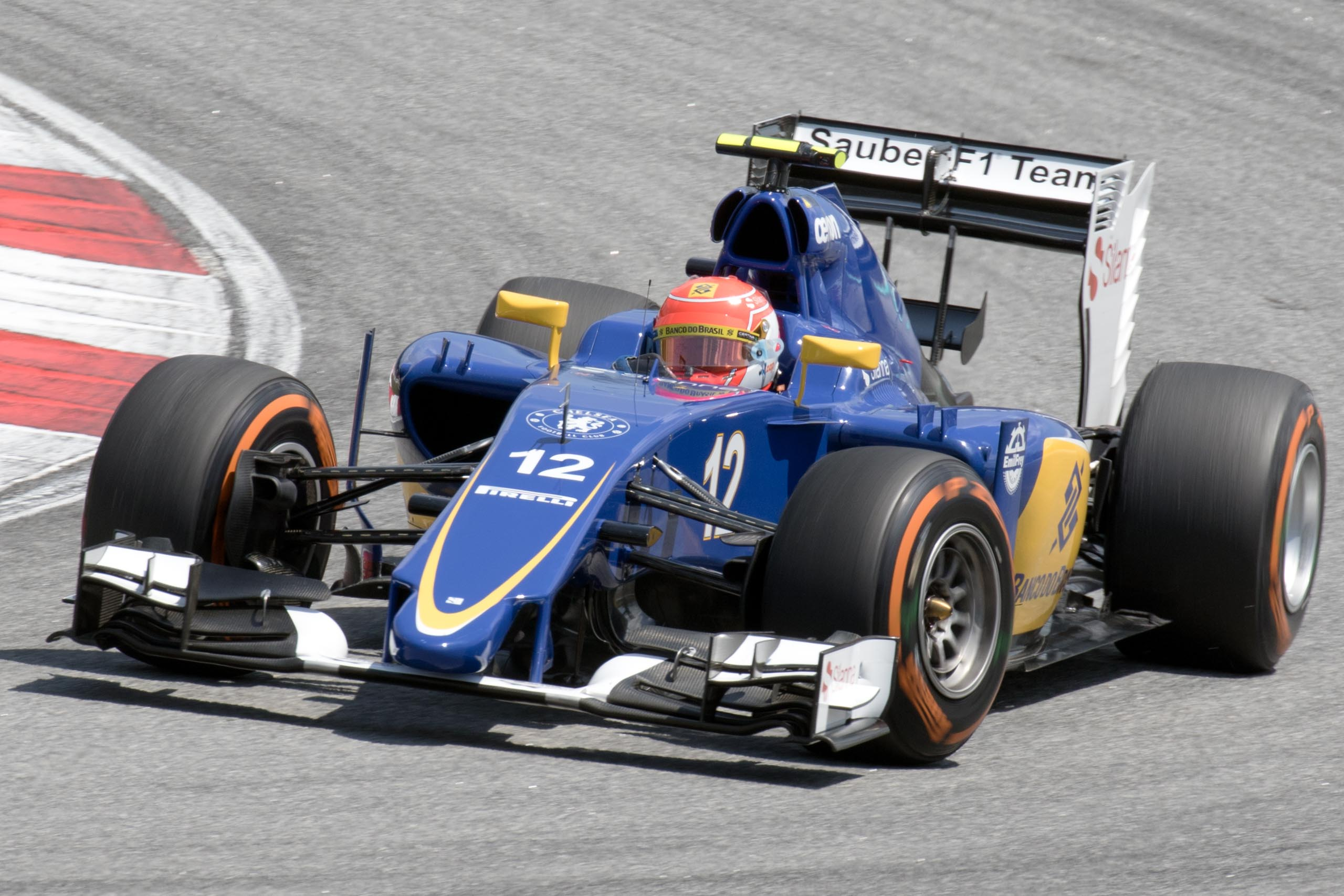
Felipe Nasr driving the Sauber C34 at the 2015 Malaysian Grand Prix

2015

On 1 November 2014, it was announced that Marcus Ericsson would drive for Sauber in 2015. On 5 November 2014, Felipe Nasr was announced as a Sauber driver to complete the 2015 line-up. Ferrari Driver Academy member Raffaele Marciello acted as reserve driver. The team also underwent a livery change in accordance to their new sponsor Banco do Brasil.

Driver's contractual dispute

The start of the season saw Sauber become involved in legal action commenced by their 2014 reserve driver, Giedo van der Garde. On 5 March 2015, van der Garde received a partial award under international arbitration by the Swiss Chambers' Arbitration Institution, upholding the driver's contract for a race seat in 2015. Sauber breached the contract when the team instead signed Felipe Nasr and Marcus Ericsson as announced in November 2014. Despite the Swiss arbitrator ordering Sauber to "refrain from taking any action the effect of which would be to deprive Mr. van der Garde of his entitlement to participate in the 2015 Formula One season as one of Sauber's two nominated race drivers", further legal action was required to see the award enforced. Just prior to the Australian Grand Prix held on 13 to 15 March 2015, van der Garde applied to an Australian court who ordered, at first instance on 11 March and on 12 March following Sauber's failed appeal, that he be permitted to race in Melbourne. Due to the risk of having its assets seized for not obeying Court orders, Sauber opted to abort participation in Friday morning's first practice session pending an outcome in contempt of court proceedings against Sauber's team principal, Monisha Kaltenborn.

Based on media speculation, however, thanks to an intervention by Bernie Ecclestone to avoid further negative publicity on the sport, Ericsson and Nasr were able to take part in Friday afternoon's second practice session. The matter was temporarily resolved on Saturday, 14 March 2015, following an announcement by van der Garde that he would forego racing in Melbourne, with a view to finding a more permanent solution in the future. The Sauber team and its new drivers for 2015, Ericsson and Nasr, were thus able to complete the Saturday qualifying session and point-scoring race on the Sunday. Three days later, on 18 March 2015, van der Garde confirmed that he and Sauber had reached, by mutual consent, a settlement that would see him relinquish, once and for all, his rights to race in Formula One with the team in return for compensation in the amount of US$16 million. The controversy, however, continued due to a statement released by van der Garde revealing further background and indicating that his intention had also been that of promoting the rights of racing drivers, whose contracts are often dishonoured. In response, the Sauber team expressed surprise at van der Garde's post-settlement statement opting to not comment further on the matter.

After the resolution of the dispute, Sauber underwent an improvement from the previous year, finishing fifth in the race, their best result all year. They finished the season eighth, ahead of McLaren and Marussia.

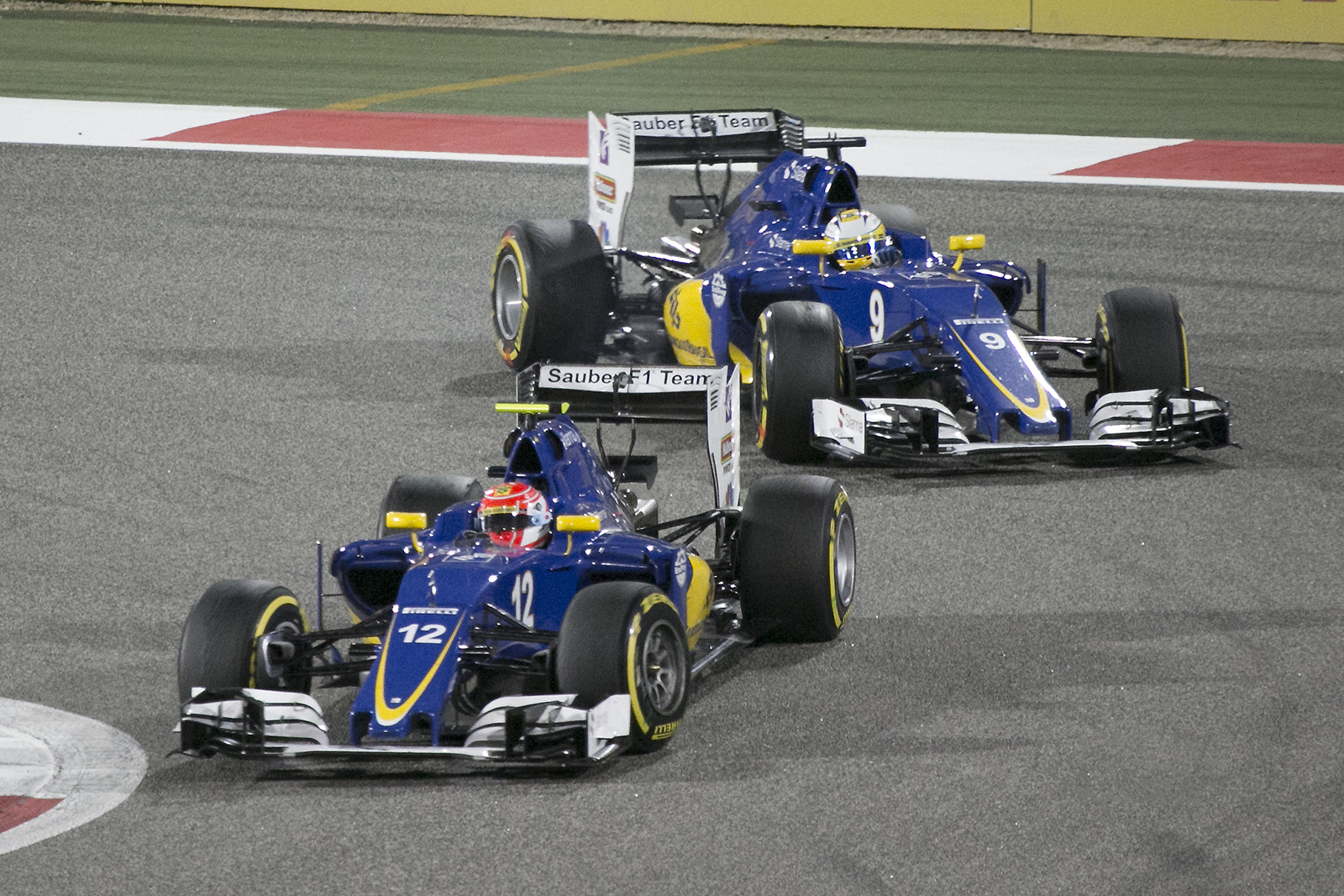
Sauber drivers Felipe Nasr and Marcus Ericsson racing for position at the 2016 Bahrain Grand Prix

2016

On 23 July 2015, Sauber confirmed that Ericsson and Nasr would be retained for 2016.

Mid 2016 sale to Longbow Finance S.A.

On 20 July 2016 it was announced that Swiss based investment firm Longbow Finance had bought both Peter Sauber and Monisha Kaltenborn's shares in the company, which made Longbow Finance the sole owner of Sauber. Pascal Picci was announced to take Peter Sauber's role as chairman of the board and president. Monisha Kaltenborn remained as Team principal and CEO of Sauber. The acquisition by Longbow Finance followed a series of speculation about the future of Sauber. The team had been in financial trouble for years before the change of ownership, often being unable to pay salaries to team members on time. Longbow's owners are said to include Swedish billionaires Finn Rausing, Stefan Persson and Karl-Johan Persson.

During the season, the team only scored points on one occasion; Felipe Nasr's ninth-placed finish in the Brazilian Grand Prix scored two points for the team, who finished tenth in the Constructors' Championship, one point ahead of Manor.

2017

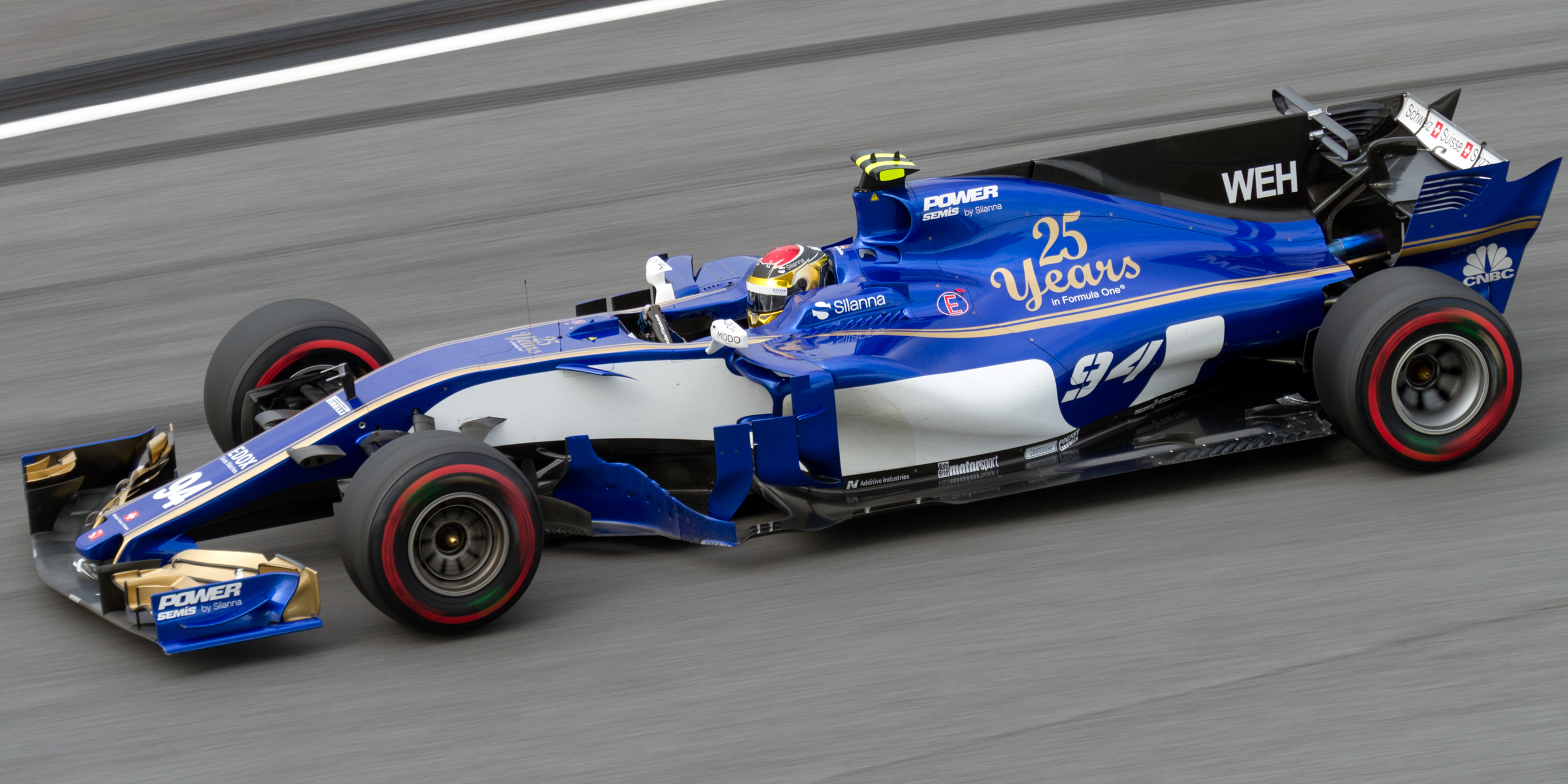
Pascal Wehrlein competing for Sauber at the 2017 Malaysian Grand Prix

On 11 November 2016, Sauber announced Ericsson would remain with the team in 2017. On 16 January 2017, the team announced the signing of Pascal Wehrlein, replacing Nasr. After Wehrlein was injured in a crash at the 2017 Race of Champions, Ferrari third driver Antonio Giovinazzi took his place for the first winter test. Despite Wehrlein being fit to take part in the Australian Grand Prix, he later withdrew after participating in the first two practice sessions, with Giovinazzi replacing him for the rest of the race weekend. Giovinazzi again replaced Wehrlein for the following race in China. Days before the 2017 Azerbaijan Grand Prix, it was confirmed that the first ever female F1 team principal Monisha Kaltenborn would be stepping down from the team. Her role was replaced by former Renault team principal Frédéric Vasseur.

==== Partnership with Alfa Romeo (2018) ====
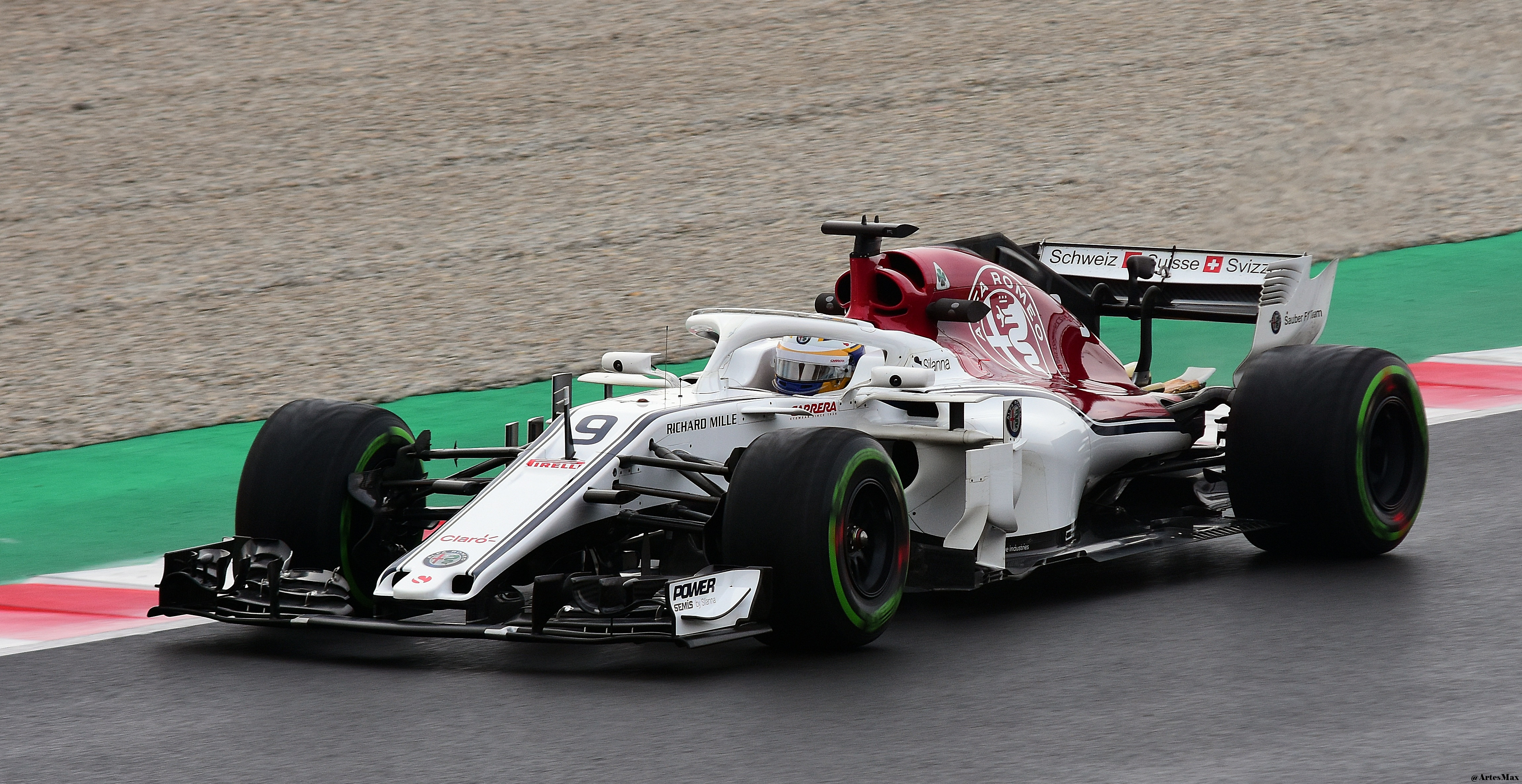
Marcus Ericsson driving an Alfa Romeo Sauber C37 during pre-season testing at the Circuit de Barcelona-Catalunya

2018

In April 2017, it was confirmed Sauber would end their engine deal with Ferrari and begin a new contract with Honda. However, on 27 July 2017, it was announced that Sauber had cancelled their planned partnership with Honda for 2018 onwards for "strategic reasons". The following day Sauber confirmed their new multi-year agreement with Ferrari for up-to-date engines starting in 2018. On 29 November 2017, Sauber announced that they had signed a multi-year technical and commercial partnership contract with Alfa Romeo, therefore the team was renamed to Alfa Romeo Sauber F1 Team for the 2018 season onwards.

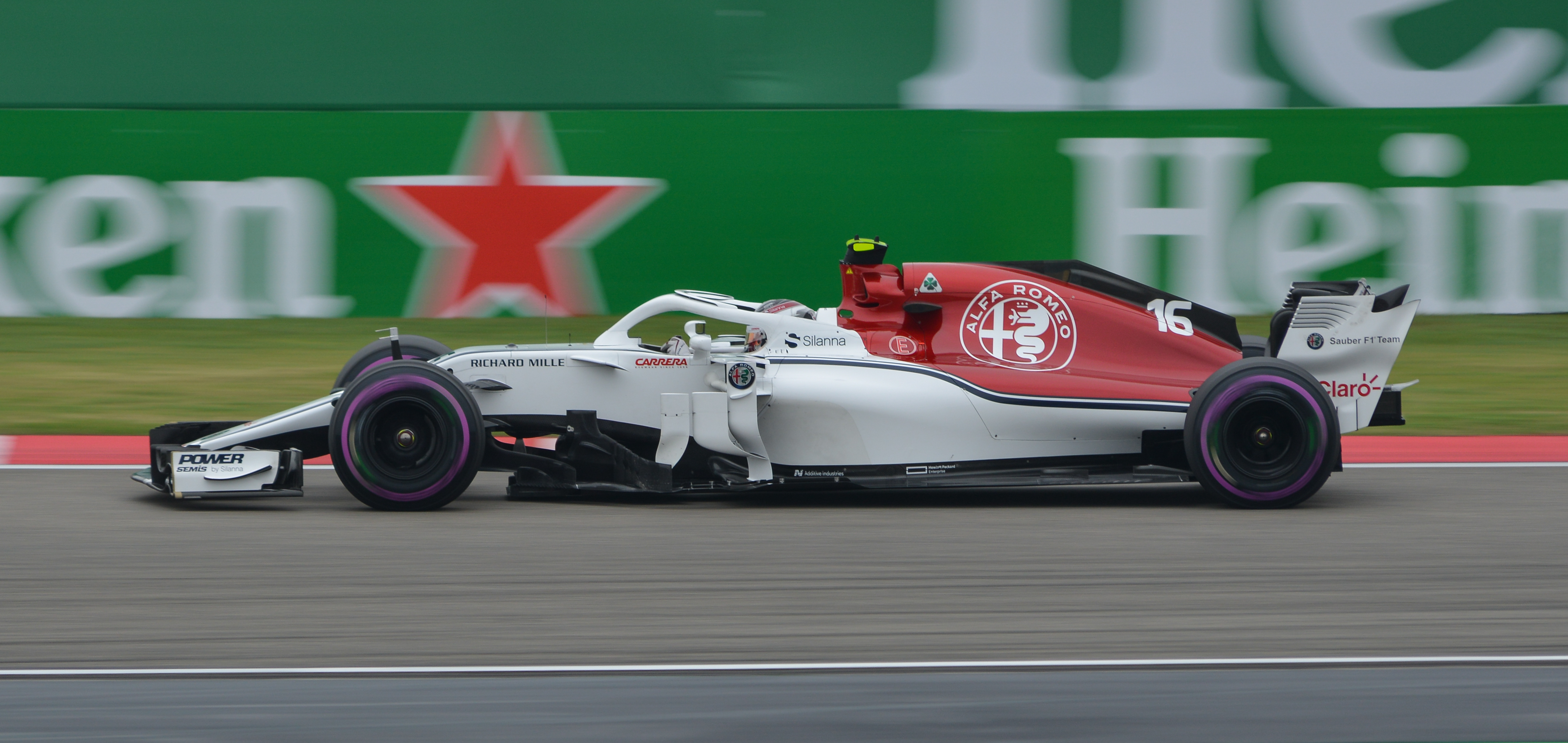
Charles Leclerc driving the Sauber C37 during the first free practice session of the 2018 Chinese Grand Prix at the Shanghai International Circuit

On 2 December 2017, it was announced that Charles Leclerc and Marcus Ericsson would be racing for the team in 2018. Tatiana Calderón was promoted to the role of test driver, having been a development driver for the team in 2017. On 8 April at the Bahrain Grand Prix, Ericsson placed ninth and picked up 2 points for the team using a one-stop strategy. Two races later, Leclerc finished sixth in the Azerbaijan Grand Prix which was the team's highest position since the 2015 Australian Grand Prix. The race that followed in Spain saw Leclerc finish in tenth and score back to back points finishing results. It was the first time Sauber finished in the points in back to back races since 2015. Over the course of the season, Sauber would finish in the points on 12 occasions and would get both cars in the points twice.

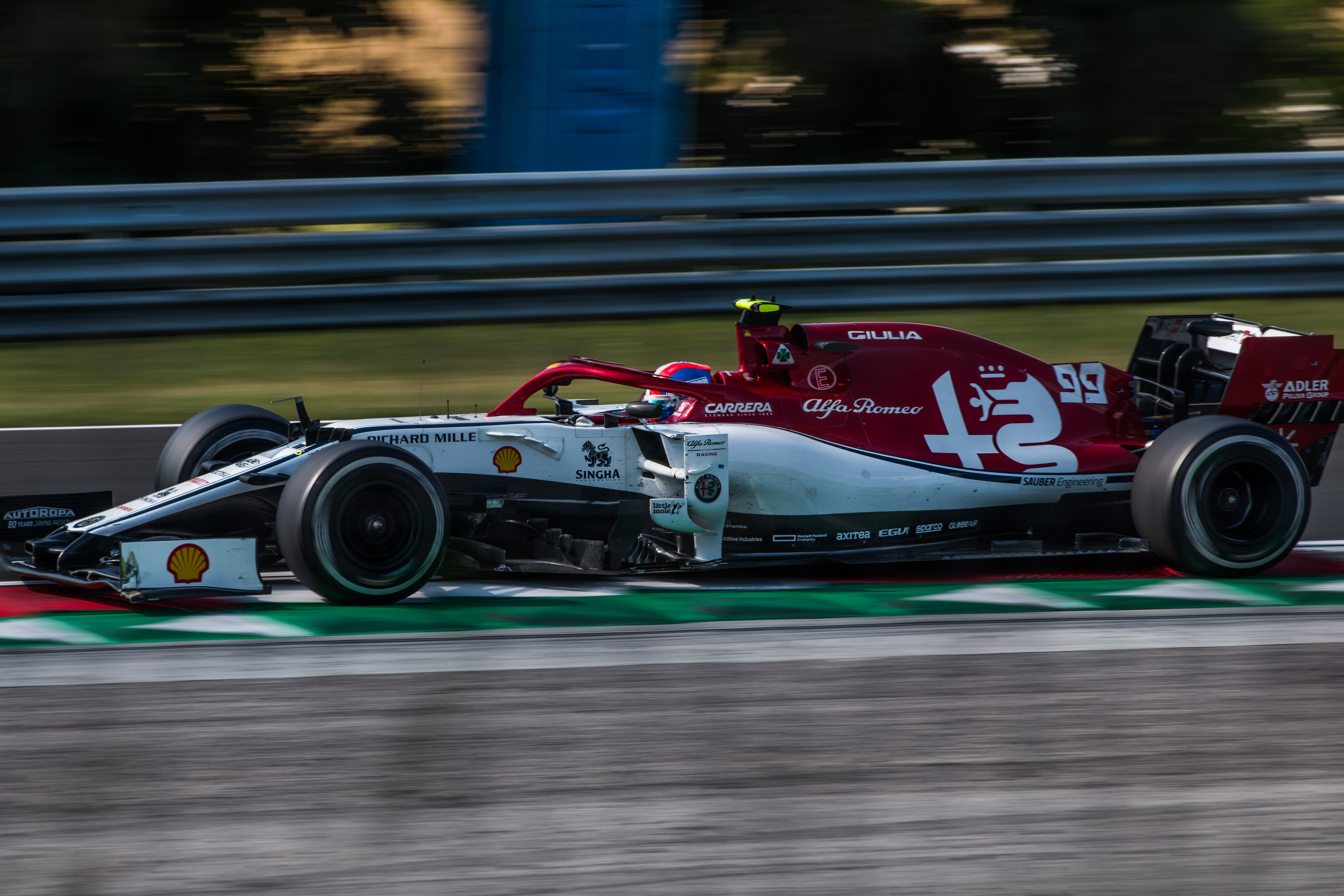
Antonio Giovinazzi driving the Alfa Romeo C38 during the 2019 Hungarian Grand Prix at the Hungaroring

Sauber finished the season with a respectable 48 points, finishing in eighth position on the Constructors' Championship. Following the season's conclusion, Ericsson was not retained for the following season and Leclerc departed for Scuderia Ferrari.

=== Alfa Romeo Racing/F1 Team (2019–2023) ===
==== 2019 ====
In September 2018, Sauber confirmed that Kimi Räikkönen would be swapping places with Charles Leclerc for the 2019 season. Also announced in September 2018 was that Ericsson would stay with the team, but as third driver and brand ambassador. Antonio Giovinazzi would replace Ericsson and drive alongside Räikkönen for the 2019 season. On 1 February 2019, Sauber announced that it would compete in the 2019 season as Alfa Romeo Racing although the ownership, Swiss racing licence, and management structure would remain unchanged. In addition to Alfa Romeo, sponsors for the season included Shell, Singha, Axitea, Carrera, Iveco, Richard Mille, Magneti Marelli, Pirelli, Claro, Adler-Pelzer, Hewlett Packard Enterprise, Betsafe, Little Mole, Singapore Airlines, Sparco, and Huski Chocolate.

The 2019 season was a good season for Alfa Romeo – they managed to score 57 points and finished eighth in the Constructors' Championship. Räikkönen managed nine point finishes over the 2019 season, with four consecutive top-10 finishes in the first four races. Giovinazzi only managed four point finishes over the season.

Highlight of the season for the team came in Brazil. After an action packed race, a collision between Alexander Albon and Lewis Hamilton saw both Alfa Romeo's promoted into the top 5. Räikkönen finished P4 and Giovinazzi finished P5, securing 22 points for the team and solidifying eighth in the Constructors' Championship.

==== 2020 ====
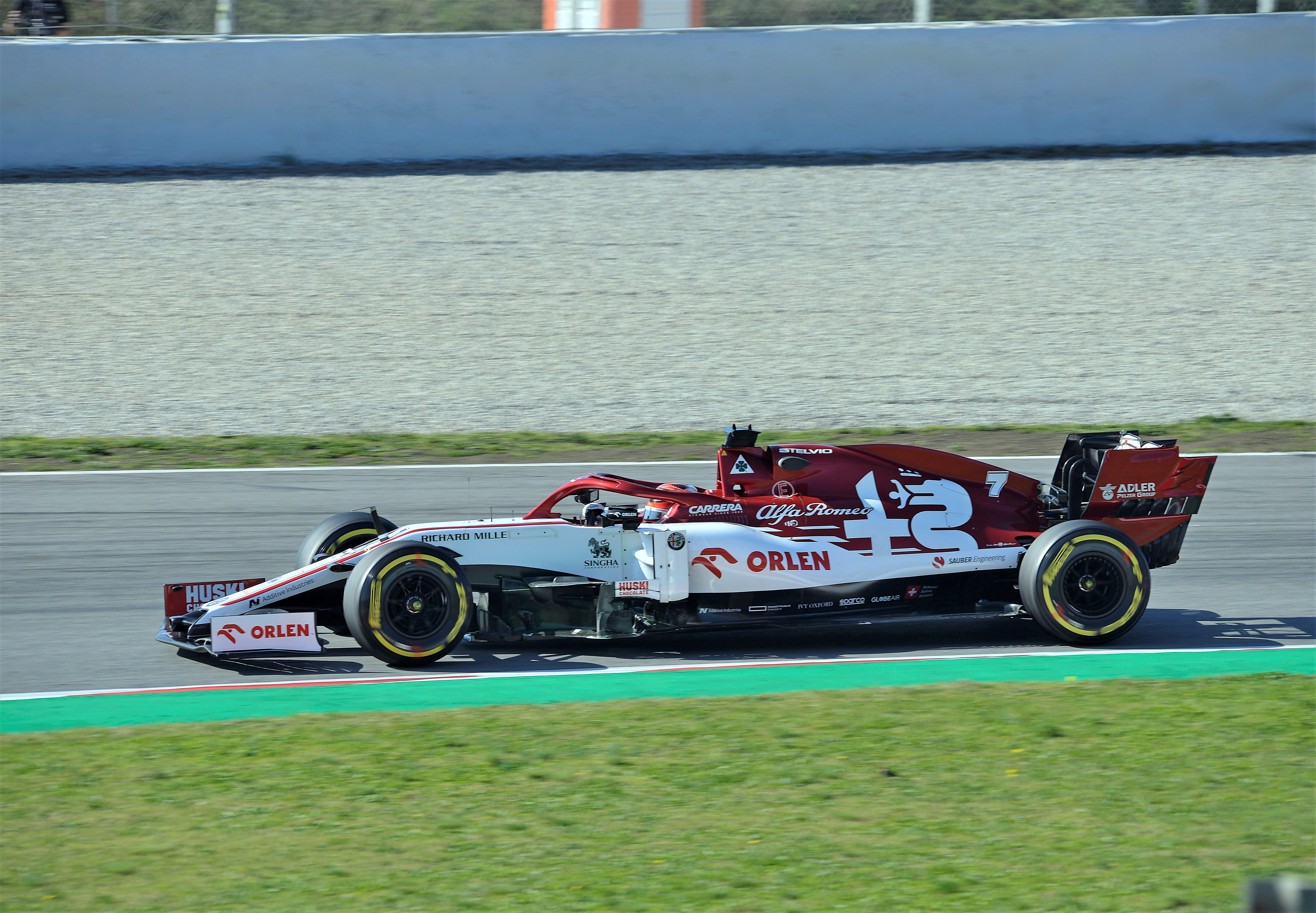
Kimi Räikkönen driving the Alfa Romeo C39 at the 2020 Pre-Season testing session at Circuit de Cataluyna

Räikkönen and Giovinazzi stayed on for the team after the 2019 season. Ericsson decided to focus fully on IndyCar rather than being Alfa Romeo's reserve driver. Ericsson ensured that he will maintain links with Alfa Romeo and Sauber. Alfa Romeo signed Robert Kubica to replace Ericsson after he was released by Williams. This also meant that PKN Orlen would become the co-title sponsors of Alfa Romeo.

After an investigation was launched against Ferrari's power unit, the FIA reached an unknown agreement with Ferrari, Haas and Alfa Romeo. The details of this agreement are unknown, but it was done to hinder the performance of the Ferrari power unit.

The 2020 season was not a good season for Alfa Romeo. While they did manage to retain eighth in the Constructors' Championship, they only managed to get eight points, 49 points below what they got in 2019. Throughout the season, Räikkönen managed only two point finishes, with Giovinazzi got three. Both drivers ended up with four points and ended in 16th and 17th in the drivers' standings respectively.

==== 2021 ====
Alfa Romeo retained both Räikkönen and Giovinazzi with Kubica as the reserve driver for the 2021 season. Ahead of the Emilia Romagna Grand Prix, Alfa Romeo confirmed that Callum Ilott would become their test driver. The Ferrari power unit agreement with the FIA had finished, meaning the power unit should be back to normal use.

Alfa Romeo finished ninth in the Constructors' Championship with 13 points. Räikkönen scored 10 points by finishing in top 10 on four occasions, while Giovinazzi scored twice to collect the remaining three points. Räikkönen tested positive for COVID-19 ahead of the Dutch Grand Prix, forcing him to sit out of the event as well as the Italian Grand Prix a week later. Kubica stood in, finishing 15th and 14th respectively.

==== 2022 ====
After Räikkönen announced his retirement and the team elected not to retain Giovinazzi, former Mercedes driver Valtteri Bottas and rookie Zhou Guanyu were signed for the 2022 season. The team entered the season as Alfa Romeo F1 Team. Bottas had a best result of fifth at Imola and finished 10th in the overall standings, whereas Zhou scored points in three races and ranked 18th in the drivers' standings.

It was the team's best finish in the Constructors' Championship since they had rebranded to Alfa Romeo in 2019, and Sauber's best finish since 2012.

==== 2023 ====
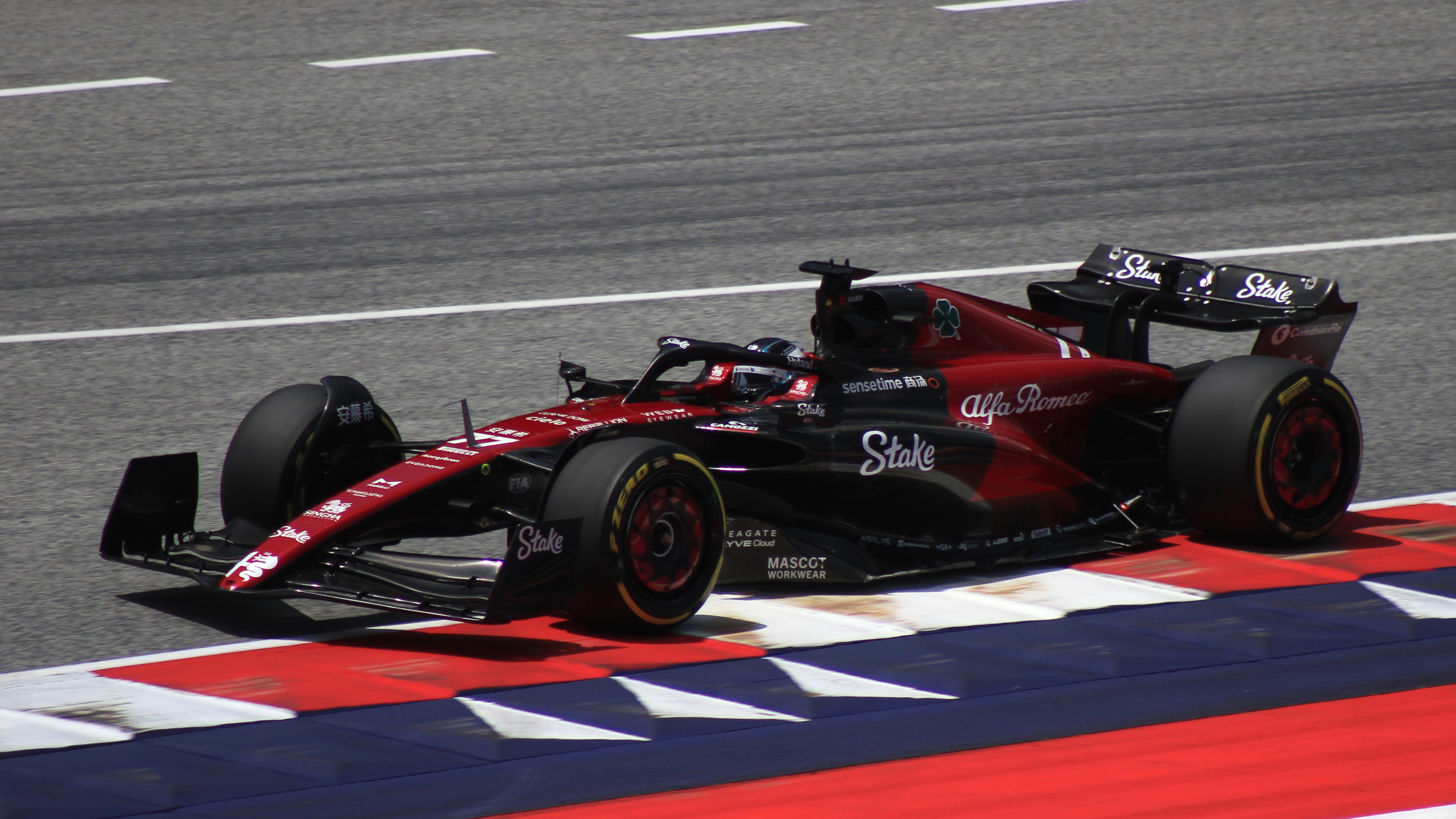
Valtteri Bottas driving the Alfa Romeo C43 at the 2023 Austrian Grand Prix

Sauber ended their relationship with Alfa Romeo at the end of 2023 season after deciding not to renew the agreement. The driver pairing of Bottas and Zhou were retained for the season. On 13 December 2022, Andreas Seidl was announced as Sauber's new chief executive officer from January 2023, replacing Frédéric Vasseur. In January 2023, Alfa Romeo announced a multi-year title sponsorship agreement with online casino Stake, renaming the team as Alfa Romeo F1 Team Stake. The team also signed a partnership agreement with live streaming platform Kick, which shares Stake co-founder and owner Eddie Craven as investors. Kick's name and logo replaced Stake's in countries where gambling and sports betting advertisements were not allowed as Alfa Romeo F1 Team Kick.

=== Kick Sauber (2024–2025) ===
==== 2024 ====
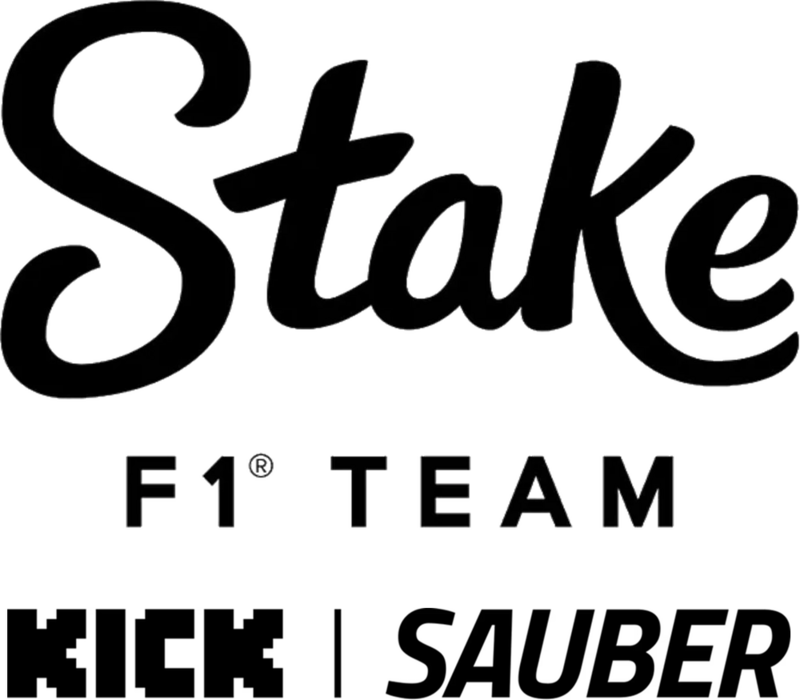
Stake F1 Team Kick Sauber logo

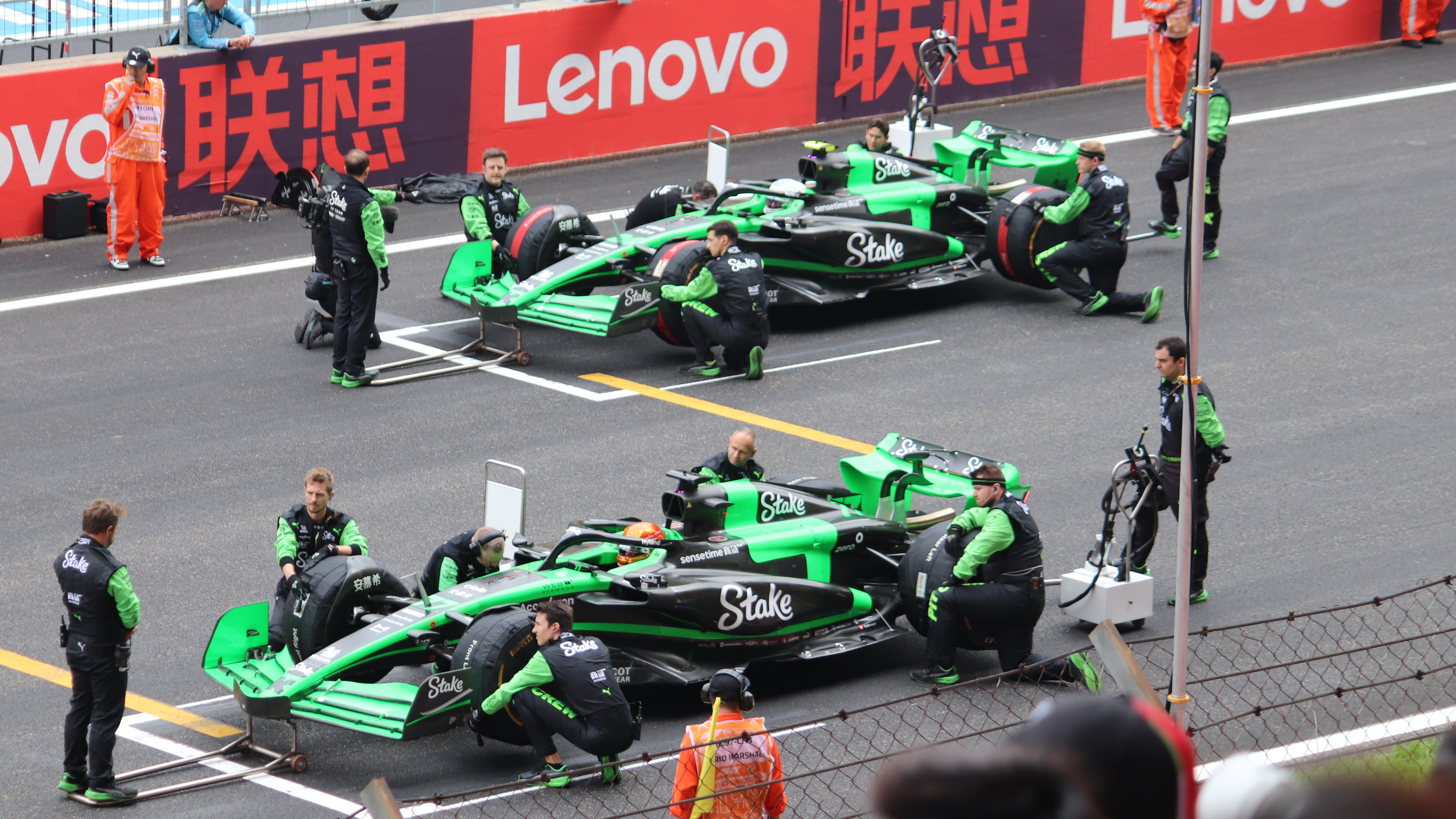
Valtteri Bottas and Zhou Guanyu on the grid for the Sprint Race at the 2024 Chinese Grand Prix

Sauber officially lost its Alfa Romeo sponsorship due to transitioning to the Audi factory team from 2026 onwards. Due to this, Sauber's links with Ferrari became weaker, with the Haas team effectively assuming Sauber's role as Ferrari's new satellite team. Sauber entered as Stake F1 Team Kick Sauber (but operated as Stake F1 Team on a day-to-day basis), continuing the sponsorship deals signed by Alfa Romeo with Stake and Kick in the previous season. In countries where gambling advertisement is disallowed, the team competed as Kick Sauber F1 Team and replaced all Stake logos on their car with Kick logos, just as they had done in 2023. Kick also acquired the naming rights of the chassis for two seasons, with the 2024 car named as Kick Sauber C44. On 5 February the car launch event was held at London's Guildhall which was hosted by Naomi Schiff. Zhou and Bottas stayed on for the 2024 season and The C44 was consistently finishing outside the points, and the team finished the 2024 season in tenth place, scoring only four points.

==== 2025 ====
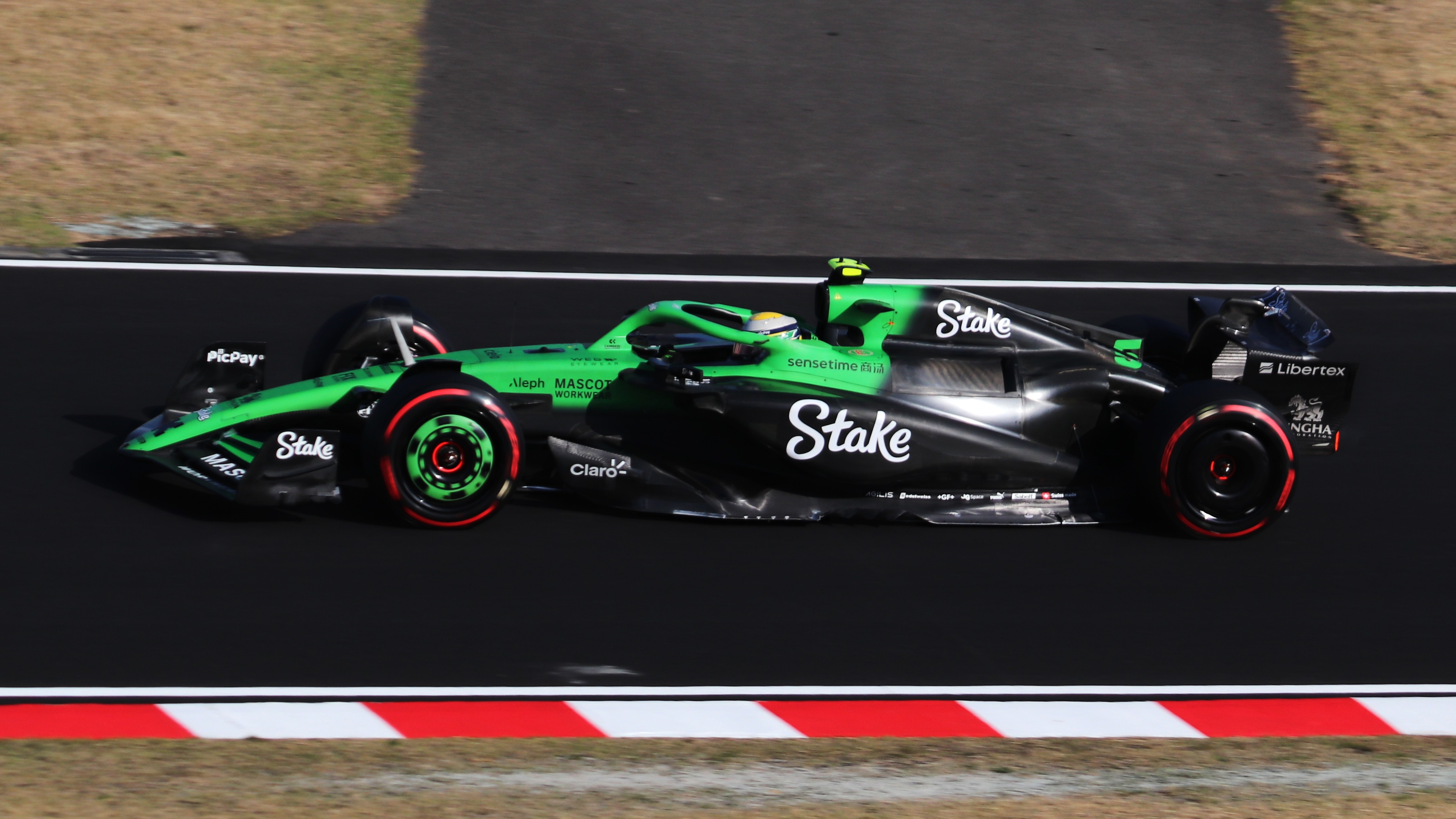
Gabriel Bortoleto driving the Sauber C45 during practice at the 2025 Japanese Grand Prix in the team's last year of competition in Formula One

Nico Hülkenberg returned to the team starting from 2025, arriving from Haas. Hülkenberg was joined by reigning Formula 2 Champion Gabriel Bortoleto, completing their lineup for 2025.

Jonathan Wheatley was initially expected to join Sauber as the new Team Principal in the summer of 2025, replacing Team Representative Alessandro Alunni Bravi. On 15 January, Sauber announced that Team Representative Alessandro Alunni Bravi would be leaving the team at the end of January. Thus, this meant that Chief Operating and Technical Officer Mattia Binotto would serve as Team Principal temporarily until Wheatley's arrival. Subsequently, reports emerged on the same day that Wheatley's gardening leave would be ending earlier and he would begin his new role on 1 April, which would be in time for the Japanese Grand Prix. On 12 March, Sauber officially confirmed that Wheatley would join the team from 1 April, which meant that he would be making his debut as Team Principal at the Japanese Grand Prix.

In February 2025, it was announced that Sauber would be opening a new 'technical centre' in the United Kingdom by the summer, with Bicester, Silverstone, and Milton Keynes as potential locations. This was part of the move to allow Sauber to “extend the team’s presence and influence within the global Formula 1 landscape” as it will give them access “to the world’s largest motorsport expertise and talent pool. Subsequently, Bicester was announced as the location which the 'technical centre' would be opened in, specifically Bicester Motion.

At the British Grand Prix, Hülkenberg finished in third place to take his first ever podium in Formula One after 239 race starts, which was also Sauber's first since the 2012 Japanese Grand Prix.

=== Audi factory team (2026–) ===
On 26 October 2022, it was announced that Sauber will compete as the Audi factory team from 2026 and will use Audi's power unit, thus ended a sixteen-year customer engine relationship with Ferrari since the 2010 season. In January 2023, Audi announced the acquisition of a minority stake in the Sauber Group. On 8 March 2024, the Audi Group confirmed a full takeover of Sauber. Former McLaren team principal Andreas Seidl was planned to continue as CEO, additionally taking over the role of team principal from Alessandro Alunni Bravi. However, he was replaced by former Ferrari team principal Mattia Binotto starting from 1 August 2024. Red Bull sporting director Jonathan Wheatley was expected to join in the summer of 2025, having left Red Bull at the end of 2024 and having planned to go on gardening leave in the start of 2025. However, he joined earlier on 1 April 2025 following a deal struck for his earlier release to Sauber.

== Sauber Academy ==
In November 2018, Sauber entered a partnership with Czech team Charouz Racing System to form the Sauber Junior Team, followed by the creation of a karting team in March 2019. In 2020, Sauber relaunched the junior team as Sauber Academy and parted ways with Charouz.

== Race cars ==
Overview of Sauber race cars
Year	Car	Image	Category
1970	Sauber C1		Group 6
1971	Sauber C2		Group 6
1973	Sauber C3		Group 5
1973	Sauber C4		Group 5
1975	Sauber C5		Group 6
1982	Sauber SHS C6		Group C
1983	Sauber C7		Group C
1985	Sauber C8		Group C1
1987	Sauber C9		Group C1
1991	Mercedes-Benz C11		Group C2
1991	Mercedes-Benz C291		Group C1
1991	Mercedes-Benz C292		Group C1
1993	Sauber C12		Formula One
1994	Sauber C13		Formula One
1995	Sauber C14		Formula One
1996	Sauber C15		Formula One
1997	Sauber C16		Formula One
1998	Sauber C17		Formula One
1999	Sauber C18		Formula One
2000	Sauber C19		Formula One
2001	Sauber C20		Formula One
2002	Sauber C21		Formula One
2003	Sauber C22		Formula One
2004	Sauber C23		Formula One
2005	Sauber C24		Formula One
2006	BMW Sauber F1.06		Formula One
2007	BMW Sauber F1.07		Formula One
2008	BMW Sauber F1.08		Formula One
2009	BMW Sauber F1.09		Formula One
2010	Sauber C29		Formula One
2011	Sauber C30		Formula One
2012	Sauber C31		Formula One
2013	Sauber C32		Formula One
2014	Sauber C33		Formula One
2015	Sauber C34		Formula One
2016	Sauber C35		Formula One
2017	Sauber C36		Formula One
2018	Sauber C37		Formula One
2019	Alfa Romeo Racing C38		Formula One
2020	Alfa Romeo Racing C39		Formula One
2021	Alfa Romeo Racing C41		Formula One
2022	Alfa Romeo C42		Formula One
2023	Alfa Romeo C43		Formula One
2024	Kick Sauber C44		Formula One
2025	Kick Sauber C45		Formula One

== Racing record ==
Formula One results
Year	Name	Car	Engine	Tyres	No.	Drivers	Points	WCC
Sauber
1993	(Switzerland) Team Sauber Formula 1	C12	Sauber 2175A 3.5 V10	G	29. 30.	(Austria) Karl Wendlinger (Finland) JJ Lehto	12	7th
1994	(Switzerland) Broker Sauber Mercedes (Switzerland) Sauber Mercedes (Note: Sauber dropped Broker as title sponsor mid-season.)	C13	Mercedes 2175B 3.5 V10	G	29. 29. 29. 30.	(Austria) Karl Wendlinger (Italy) Andrea de Cesaris (Finland) JJ Lehto (Germany) Heinz-Harald Frentzen	12	8th
1995	(Switzerland) Red Bull Sauber Ford	C14	Ford ECA Zetec-R 3.0 V8	G	29. 29. 30.	(Austria) Karl Wendlinger (France) Jean-Christophe Boullion (Germany) Heinz-Harald Frentzen	18	7th
1996	(Switzerland) Red Bull Sauber Ford	C15	Ford JD Zetec-R 3.0 V10	G	14. 15.	(United Kingdom) Johnny Herbert (Germany) Heinz-Harald Frentzen	11	7th
1997	(Switzerland) Red Bull Sauber Petronas	C16	Petronas SPE-01 3.0 V10	G	16. 17. 17. 17.	(United Kingdom) Johnny Herbert (Italy) Nicola Larini (Italy) Gianni Morbidelli (Argentina) Norberto Fontana	16	7th
1998	(Switzerland) Red Bull Sauber Petronas	C17	Petronas SPE-01D 3.0 V10	G	14. 15.	(France) Jean Alesi (United Kingdom) Johnny Herbert	10	6th
1999	(Switzerland) Red Bull Sauber Petronas	C18	Petronas SPE-03A 3.0 V10	B	11. 12.	(France) Jean Alesi (Brazil) Pedro Diniz	5	8th
2000	(Switzerland) Red Bull Sauber Petronas	C19	Petronas SPE-04A 3.0 V10	B	16. 17.	(Brazil) Pedro Diniz (Finland) Mika Salo	6	8th
2001	(Switzerland) Red Bull Sauber Petronas	C20	Petronas 01A 3.0 V10	B	16. 17.	(Germany) Nick Heidfeld (Finland) Kimi Räikkönen	21	4th
2002	(Switzerland) Sauber Petronas	C21	Petronas 02A 3.0 V10	B	7. 8. 8.	(Germany) Nick Heidfeld (Brazil) Felipe Massa (Germany) Heinz-Harald Frentzen	11	5th
2003	(Switzerland) Sauber Petronas	C22	Petronas 03A 3.0 V10	B	9. 10.	(Germany) Nick Heidfeld (Germany) Heinz-Harald Frentzen	19	6th
2004	(Switzerland) Sauber Petronas	C23	Petronas 04A 3.0 V10	B	11. 12.	(Italy) Giancarlo Fisichella (Brazil) Felipe Massa	34	6th
2005	(Switzerland) Sauber Petronas	C24	Petronas 05A 3.0 V10	M	11. 12.	(Canada) Jacques Villeneuve (Brazil) Felipe Massa	20	8th
BMW Sauber
2006	(Germany) BMW Sauber F1 Team	F1.06	BMW P86/6 2.4 V8	M	16. 17. 17.	(Germany) Nick Heidfeld (Canada) Jacques Villeneuve (Poland) Robert Kubica	36	5th
2007	(Germany) BMW Sauber F1 Team	F1.07	BMW P86/7 2.4 V8	B	9. 10. 10.	(Germany) Nick Heidfeld (Poland) Robert Kubica (Germany) Sebastian Vettel	101	2nd
2008	(Germany) BMW Sauber F1 Team	F1.08	BMW P86/8 2.4 V8	B	3. 4.	(Germany) Nick Heidfeld (Poland) Robert Kubica	135	3rd
2009	(Germany) BMW Sauber F1 Team	F1.09	BMW P86/9 2.4 V8	B	5. 6.	(Poland) Robert Kubica (Germany) Nick Heidfeld	36	6th
2010	(Switzerland) BMW Sauber F1 Team (Note: BMW remained in the team's official title due to issues with the Concorde Agreement.)	C29	Ferrari 056 2.4 V8	B	22. 22. 23.	(Spain) Pedro de la Rosa (Germany) Nick Heidfeld (Japan) Kamui Kobayashi	44	8th
Sauber
2011	(Switzerland) Sauber F1 Team	C30	Ferrari 056 2.4 V8	P	16. 17. 17.	(Japan) Kamui Kobayashi (Mexico) Sergio Pérez (Spain) Pedro de la Rosa	44	7th
2012	(Switzerland) Sauber F1 Team	C31	Ferrari 056 2.4 V8	P	14. 15.	(Japan) Kamui Kobayashi (Mexico) Sergio Pérez	126	6th
2013	(Switzerland) Sauber F1 Team	C32	Ferrari 056 2.4 V8	P	11. 12.	(Germany) Nico Hülkenberg (Mexico) Esteban Gutiérrez	57	7th
2014	(Switzerland) Sauber F1 Team	C33	Ferrari 059/3 1.6 V6 t	P	21. 99.	(Mexico) Esteban Gutiérrez (Germany) Adrian Sutil	0	10th
2015	(Switzerland) Sauber F1 Team	C34	Ferrari 060 1.6 V6 t	P	9. 12.	(Sweden) Marcus Ericsson (Brazil) Felipe Nasr	36	8th
2016	(Switzerland) Sauber F1 Team	C35	Ferrari 061 1.6 V6 t	P	9. 12.	(Sweden) Marcus Ericsson (Brazil) Felipe Nasr	2	10th
2017	(Switzerland) Sauber F1 Team	C36	Ferrari 061 1.6 V6 t	P	9. 36. 94.	(Sweden) Marcus Ericsson (Italy) Antonio Giovinazzi (Germany) Pascal Wehrlein	5	10th
2018	(Switzerland) Alfa Romeo Sauber F1 Team	C37	Ferrari 063 1.6 V6 t	P	9. 16.	(Sweden) Marcus Ericsson (Monaco) Charles Leclerc	48	8th
Alfa Romeo
2019	(Switzerland) Alfa Romeo Racing	C38	Ferrari 064 1.6 V6 t	P	7. 99.	(Finland) Kimi Räikkönen (Italy) Antonio Giovinazzi	57	8th
2020	(Switzerland) Alfa Romeo Racing Orlen	C39	Ferrari 065 1.6 V6 t	P	7. 99.	(Finland) Kimi Räikkönen (Italy) Antonio Giovinazzi	8	8th
2021	(Switzerland) Alfa Romeo Racing Orlen	C41	Ferrari 065/6 1.6 V6 t	P	7. 88. 99.	(Finland) Kimi Räikkönen (Poland) Robert Kubica (Italy) Antonio Giovinazzi	13	9th
2022	(Switzerland) Alfa Romeo F1 Team Orlen	C42	Ferrari 066/7 1.6 V6 t	P	24. 77.	(China) Zhou Guanyu (Finland) Valtteri Bottas	55	6th
2023	(Switzerland) Alfa Romeo F1 Team Stake (Switzerland) Alfa Romeo F1 Team Kick	C43	Ferrari 066/10 1.6 V6 t	P	24. 77.	(China) Zhou Guanyu (Finland) Valtteri Bottas	16	9th
Kick Sauber
2024	(Switzerland) Stake F1 Team Kick Sauber (Switzerland) Kick Sauber F1 Team	C44	Ferrari 066/12 1.6 V6 t	P	24. 77.	(China) Zhou Guanyu (Finland) Valtteri Bottas	4	10th
2025	(Switzerland) Stake F1 Team Kick Sauber (Switzerland) Kick Sauber F1 Team	C45	Ferrari 066/12 1.6 V6 t	P	5. 27.	(Brazil) Gabriel Bortoleto (Germany) Nico Hülkenberg	70	9th

=== 24 Hours of Le Mans results ===
Year	Entrant	No.	Tyres	Car	Drivers	Class	Laps	Pos.	Class Pos.
1977	(Switzerland) P. Sauber AG (Switzerland) Francy Racing	21	G	Sauber C5	(Switzerland) Eugen Strähl (Switzerland) Peter Bernhard	Gr.6; S 2.0	161	DNF	DNF
1978	(Switzerland) Francy Sauber PP AG	23	P	Sauber C5 B	(Switzerland) Marc Surer (Switzerland) Eugen Strähl (Switzerland) Harry Blumer	Gr.6; S 2.0	257	NC	NC
1981	(Germany) BASF Cassetten Team GS Sport	50	D	BMW M1	(Germany) Hans-Joachim Stuck (France) Jean-Pierre Jarier (Germany) Helmut Henzler	IMSA; GTX	57	DNF	DNF
1981	(Switzerland) Würth-Lubrifilm Team Sauber	52	D	BMW M1	(Switzerland) Marc Surer (Canada) David Deacon (Austria) Dieter Quester	Gr.5; S +2.0	207	DNF	DNF
1982	(Germany) BASF Cassetten Team GS Sport	19	D	Sauber SHS C6	(Switzerland) Walter Brun (Germany) Siegfried Müller Jr.	Gr.C	55	DNF	DNF
1982	(Germany) BASF Cassetten Team GS Sport	20	D	Sauber SHS C6	(Germany) Hans-Joachim Stuck (France) Jean-Louis Schlesser (Austria) Dieter Quester	Gr.C	76	DNF	DNF
1983	Sauber Team Switzerland	46	D	Sauber C7	(Colombia) Diego Montoya (United States) Tony Garcia (United States) Albert Naon	Gr.C	339	9th	9th
1985	(Switzerland) Sauber	61	D	Sauber C8	(Denmark) John Nielsen (Austria) Dieter Quester (Switzerland) Max Welti	C1	0	DNS	DNS
1986	(Switzerland) Kouros Racing	61	G	Sauber C8	(Denmark) John Nielsen (New Zealand) Mike Thackwell	C1	61	DNF	DNF
1986	(Switzerland) Kouros Racing	62	G	Sauber C8	(France) Henri Pescarolo (Germany) Christian Danner (Austria) Dieter Quester	C1	86	DNF	DNF
1987	(Switzerland) Kouros Racing	61	M	Sauber C9	(France) Henri Pescarolo (New Zealand) Mike Thackwell (Japan) Hideki Okada	C1	123	DNF	DNF
1987	(Switzerland) Kouros Racing	62	M	Sauber C9	(United Kingdom) Johnny Dumfries (New Zealand) Mike Thackwell (United States) Chip Ganassi	C1	37	DNF	DNF
1988	(Switzerland) Team Sauber Mercedes	61	M	Sauber C9	(Germany) Jochen Mass (Italy) Mauro Baldi (United Kingdom) James Weaver	C1	0	DNS	DNS
1988	(Switzerland) Team Sauber Mercedes	62	M	Sauber C9	(Germany) Klaus Niedzwiedz (United Kingdom) Kenny Acheson (Germany) Jochen Mass	C1	0	DNS	DNS
1989	(Switzerland) Team Sauber Mercedes	61	M	Sauber C9	(Italy) Mauro Baldi (United Kingdom) Kenny Acheson (Italy) Gianfranco Brancatelli	C1	385	2nd	2nd
1989	(Switzerland) Team Sauber Mercedes	62	M	Sauber C9	(France) Jean-Louis Schlesser (France) Jean-Pierre Jabouille (France) Alain Cudini	C1	379	5th	5th
1989	(Switzerland) Team Sauber Mercedes	63	M	Sauber C9	(Germany) Jochen Mass (Germany) Manuel Reuter (Sweden) Stanley Dickens	C1	390	1st	1st
1991	(Germany) Team Sauber Mercedes	1	G	Mercedes-Benz C11	(France) Jean-Louis Schlesser (Germany) Jochen Mass (France) Alain Ferté	C2	319	DNF	DNF
1991	(Germany) Team Sauber Mercedes	2	G	Mercedes-Benz C291	(Germany) Fritz Kreutzpointner	C1	0	DNQ	DNQ
1991	(Germany) Team Sauber Mercedes	31	G	Mercedes-Benz C11	(Germany) Michael Schumacher (Austria) Karl Wendlinger (Germany) Fritz Kreutzpointner	C2	355	DNF	DNF
1991	(Germany) Team Sauber Mercedes	32	G	Mercedes-Benz C11	(United Kingdom) Jonathan Palmer (Sweden) Stanley Dickens (Denmark) Kurt Thiim	C2	223	DNF	DNF
