= Giampaolo Dall'Ara =

Italian engineer

- Born: 8 July 1968 (age 58); Rimini, Italy
- Occupation: Engineer
- Employer: Audi Revolut F1 Team
- Title: Head of trackside engineering

Giampaolo Dall'Ara (born 8 July 1968) is an Italian Formula One engineer. He is the head of trackside engineering at the Sauber Formula One Team.

== Career ==
Dall’Ara studied Mechanical Engineering in Milan before beginning his professional career in the automotive industry. He continued his studies at the Fiat Research Centre, focusing on road car testing and handling development, and later worked with the Alfa Corse programme.

He joined Sauber as a Test Engineer, progressing to Head of Test Engineering before becoming a Race Engineer, a position he held for eight years, including during the period when the team competed as BMW Sauber. He engineered Giancarlo Fisichella, Jacques Villeneuve, Robert Kubica and Nick Heidfeld. He was promoted to Head of Track Engineering under the BMW banner in 2009. After a brief spell as a Strategy Engineer in 2013, he returned to his previous position the following season. He left the team in 2016 and subsequently worked in the DTM series.

Dall’Ara later rejoined Sauber as Head of Track Engineering, overseeing the team's trackside operations as it prepares for its rebranding as Audi ahead of the 2026 Formula One season.
