= Suspension arm =

Suspension arm may refer to:

- control arm, a suspension comportment which is mounted at two points on the body of a vehicle
- suspension link, a suspension component which is mounted at only one point on the body of a vehicle
