= 1983 24 Hours of Le Mans =

51st 24 Hours of Le Mans endurance race

Previous: 1982	Next: 1984
Index: Races | Winners

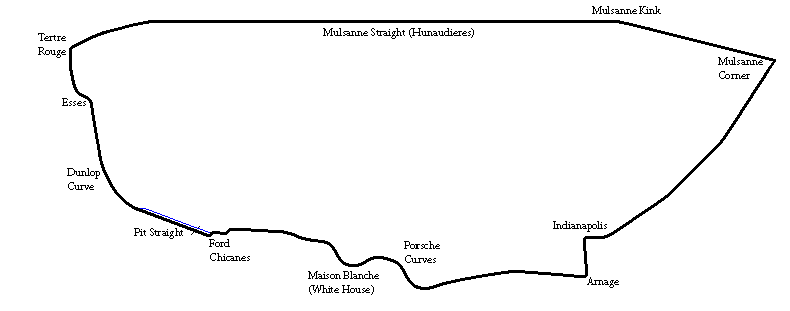
Circuit de la Sarthe in 1983

The 1983 24 Hours of Le Mans was a motor race staged at the Circuit de la Sarthe, Le Mans, France on 18 and 19 June 1983. It was the 51st Grand Prix of Endurance and was also the fourth round of both the 1983 World Endurance Championship and the 1983 European Endurance Championship. The 1983 race was held eight days before the 60th anniversary of the inaugural race held in 1923.

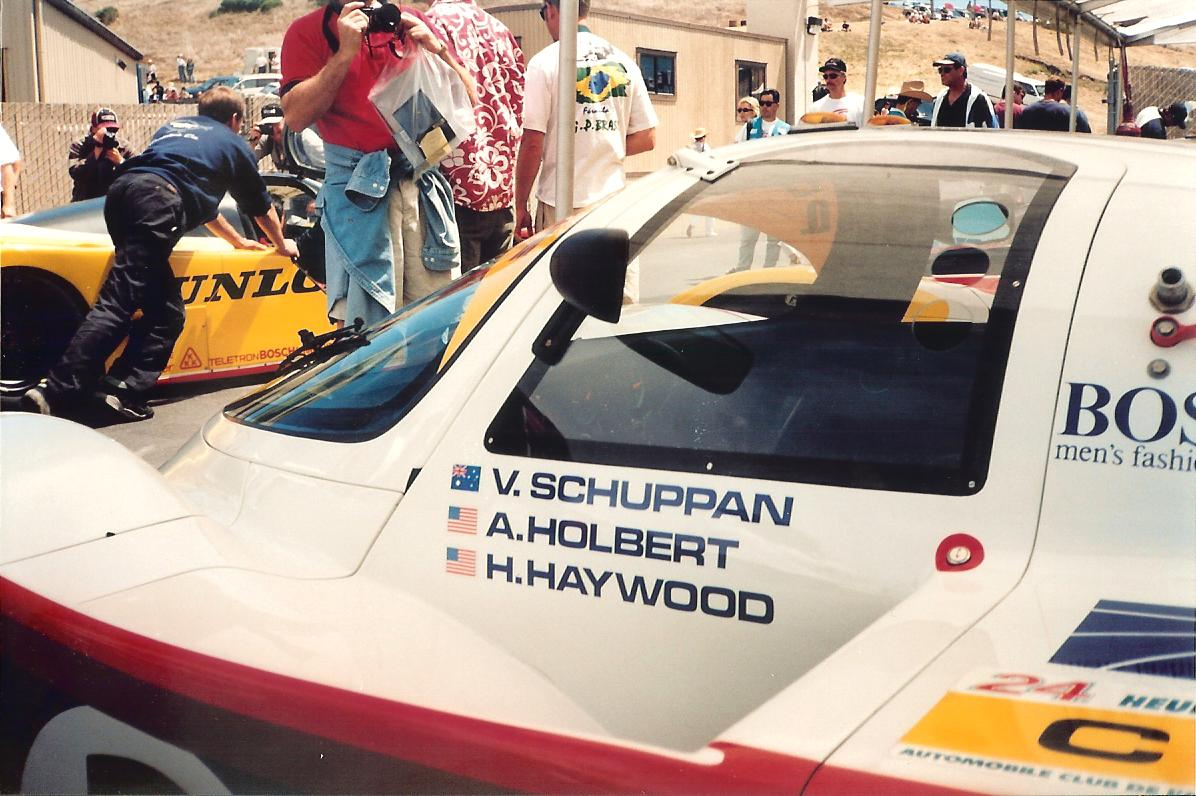
The winning Porsche

The Porsche 956 was the dominant car in the Championship series, as the company had released cars for customer sale. Although Lancia were quick in practice they were too unreliable in the race. From the start, the works Porsche team took the lead. As rival marques fell away with engine issues, the Porsches consolidated the top-ten. The Kremer car of Mario Andretti led the pursuit, running 2nd for a time on Sunday morning. The Ickx/Bell car had been delayed early in the race, but hard driving had got them back to the top-three. They briefly took the lead soon after dawn but Bell stopped at Mulsanne and lost five laps repairing an electrical fault.

With less than ninety minutes to go, the third works Porsche looked set for victory, after taking the lead in the fifth hour. However, when a door blew off the car Schuppan saw his temperature gauges spike. Al Holbert took the car out for the final stint at a careful pace, with Bell closing in relentlessly, although he was suffering from damaged front brakes. With half an hour to go, Bell unlapped himself to put himself on the lead lap. With two minutes to go, Holbert's engine seized as he passed the pits, having run out of water and overheated. However, by good fortune he was able to get it going again. He made it around one last time, to the finish line, and pulled off straight away. Bell came home just over a minute later running on his reserve fuel-tank. Neither car would likely have done another lap, which would have potentially given the victory to the Kremer Porsche that finished third, six laps back.

The crushing victory by Porsche saw nine of their cars in the top-10, also winning the Index Prize and the win in Group B. The works Mazda had a trouble-free run for a comfortable win in the new Group C Junior class.

== Regulations ==
This year was the second year of the Group C regulations and there were no changes made. The formula had an open engine capacity, and instead had weight and fuel consumption restrictions. There was a minimum weight of 800 kg put in for safety standards and fuel tanks were a maximum of 100 litres capacity. With no more than 25 fuel stops allowed in the race, it meant a maximum of 2600 litres from the start. With IMSA still using their own sliding weight-scale to balance engine capacity, the major American endurance races, at Daytona and Sebring, could not be part of the World Championship.

This formula attracted great interest from a number of manufacturers and the major privateer teams. However, the prospective costs were prohibitive for smaller teams wanting to compete in the top tier of racing. The FIA governing body took notice of this, and instigated a less expensive division called Group C Junior to encourage those teams. Here the minimum weight was reduced to 700 kg and the fuel-tanks were only 55 litres capacity. With the same 25 fuel stops, this gave those cars a maximum of 1430 litres.

For its part, the Automobile Club de l'Ouest (ACO) made no major changes either. The two 4-hour practice sessions now each included a 1-hour break to allow teams to retrieve stranded cars or make significant repairs or change their car set-ups. With the surge of entries in the new regulations, they could close the lists without needing the MSA classes and the former "grandfathered" classes.

== Entries ==
The new regulations had immediately proven successful and this year's Le Mans had an extensive range of entries. It was led by factory teams from Porsche, Lancia and Mazda and over a dozen specialist constructors meant there were 34 cars that could be classed as "works" entries. Porsche dominated the entry list with eleven Group C and eight Group B entries.

Class	Quantity	Turbo/Rotary engines
Group C	51 / 38	27 / 21
Group C Junior	6 / 5	4 / 3
Group B	8 / 8	6 / 6
Total Entries	69 / 51	37 / 30

- Note: The first number is the number of arrivals, the second the number who started.

=== Group C ===
The Porsche 956 had made a victorious impact on its 1982 debut. The 1983 iteration was 20 kg lighter and had improved front suspension and the new Bosch Motronic engine-management system to modulate and tune the engine performance. Three race-cars and a test-car were entered by the works team. The lead drivers were the elite pairing of Jacky Ickx and Derek Bell, looking for a hat-trick of victories. Jochen Mass was in the second car, paired with the new wunderkind, Stefan Bellof who had just stunned the endurance world a fortnight earlier with a blistering qualifying lap-record at the Nürburgring in its last year of full competitive use. In the third car was the American pair of Hurley Haywood and Al Holbert along with Australian Vern Schuppan.

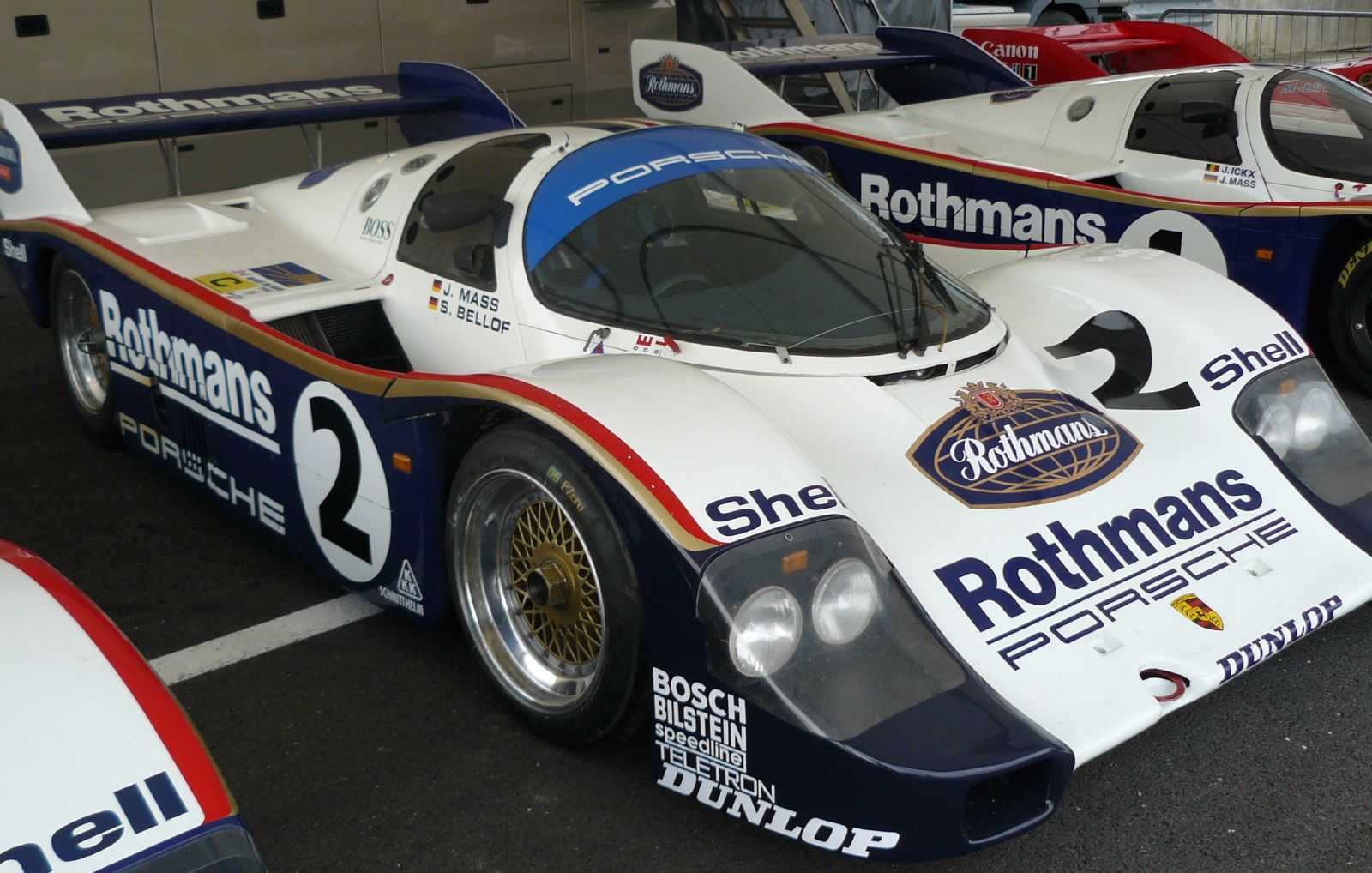
Porsche 956 of the works team

As Porsche promised, they released twelve chassis for customer sale. Based on the 1982 chassis, with Bosch mechanical control, they were quickly snapped up, albeit at a hefty £160,000 (DM640,000) each. Eight of those cars were at Le Mans. Reinhold Joest had bought two, and had a surprise victory over the works team at the opening round at Monza. Winner in Italy, Bob Wollek, was paired with former Le Mans winner Klaus Ludwig and debutante Stefan Johansson, with the second car driven by Merl/Schickentanz/de Narvaez. Wollek had just come out of hospital after an operation for a pinched nerve on his vertebrae. The team also fielded their 936CJ special from the previous year, once again driven by its owners, the Belgian Martin brothers. Another Porsche stalwart, John Fitzpatrick also bought two cars. Fitzpatrick entered himself as a driver in both cars – the first with Dieter Quester/David Hobbs and the other with Guy Edwards/Rupert Keegan. JFR also supported American Preston Henn's 956, entered from the IMSA series. Henn had Jean-Louis Schlesser and GT-veteran Claude Ballot-Léna as his co-drivers.

The Kremer brothers had achieved Le Mans glory in 1979 and established a successful range of modified Porsche 935 specials for customer sale. Their 956 was driven by father and son pair Mario and Michael Andretti, with F2 driver Philippe Alliot. The Andrettis had been thwarted by officialdom the previous year, disqualified on the start-line. And like Joest, the Kremers also had two of their 936 specials (the C-K5) in the race. Their team-car was driven by Derek Warwick/Frank Jelinski/Patrick Gaillard. The original model (that had run in 1982) had been sold to Richard Cleare, who had won the GT class in the same race. He teamed up with his same driver line-up (Tony Dron/Richard Jones) for this event. The final two 956 customer cars were entered by Richard Lloyd's GTi Engineering and Obermeier Racing. Lloyd had also graduated from running GT Porsches, with his Canon sponsorship. He was joined by up-and-coming young drivers Jonathon Palmer and Jan Lammers. German Jürgen Lässig had now formed his own team, along with Hans Obermeier and sponsorship from Hugo Boss fashion. His regular co-driver in the WEC was Axel Plankenhorn and for this race they were joined by female single-seat racer, South African Desiré Wilson.

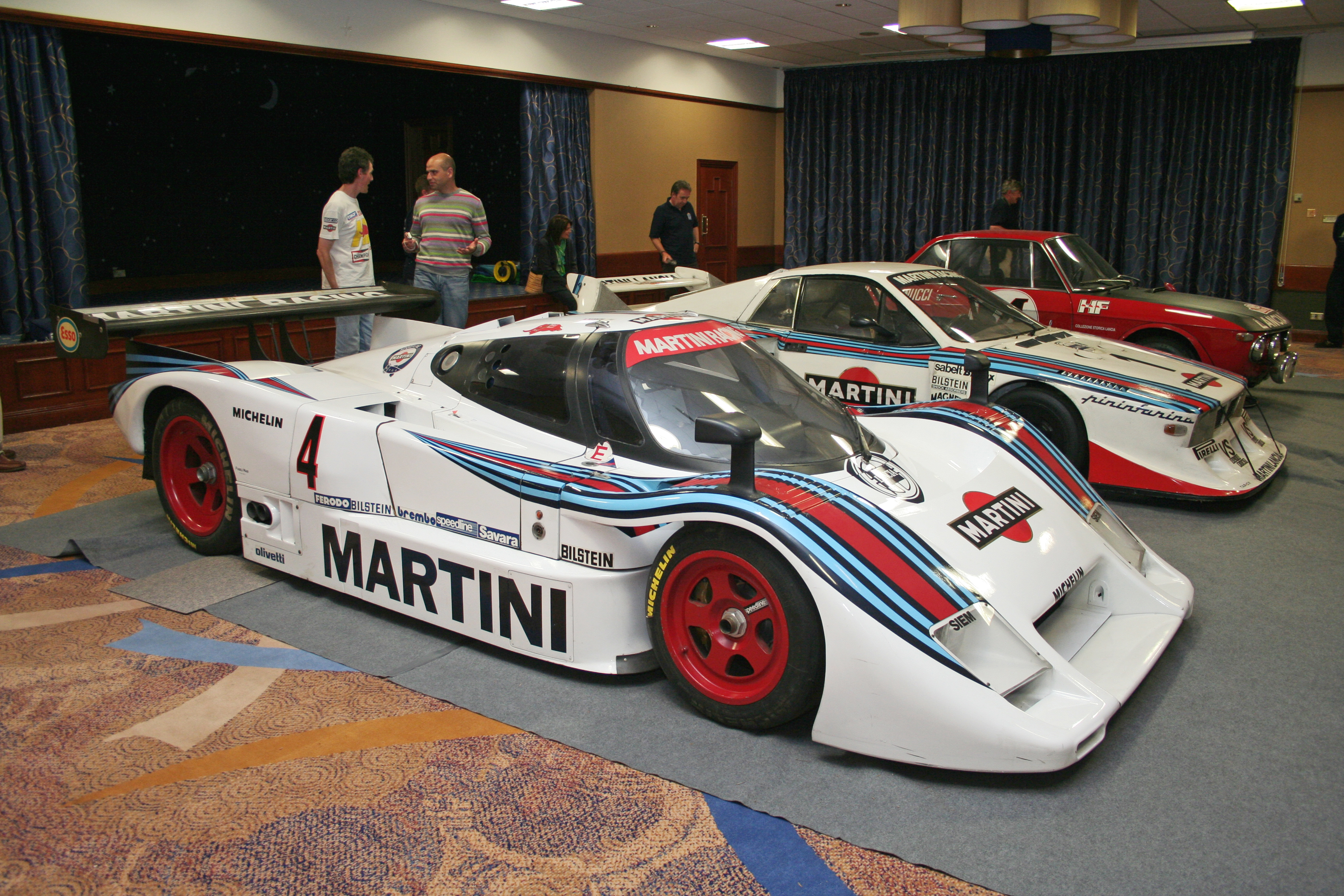
Lancia LC2

It was apparent in the shorter endurance races that the primary opposition to Porsche's dominance would come from Lancia. After working the rules the previous year with their LC1, the company produced their Group C candidate. Designed by GianPaolo Dallara, it was built around the Ferrari 2.6-litre V8 used in its 308 GTB road-car. Fitted with twin KKK (Kühnle, Kopp & Kausch) turbos and a Weber-Marelli engine-management system, the engine could put out 650 bhp on 1.2-bar boost. The LC2 had a Kevlar and carbonfibre bodyshell designed by Pininfarina and was fast, but had proven fragile. Three cars were brought to Le Mans, once again built around their Grand Prix drivers: Michele Alboreto/Teo Fabi, Piercarlo Ghinzani/Hans Heyer (on loan from Joest) and Alessandro Nannini/Paolo Barilla/Jean-Claude Andruet. In the early-season they had been shod with Pirelli tyres, but after proving troublesome they were swapped out for Dunlops. The Sivama team had raced Group 5 Lancia Montecarlos in the Championship the previous year. This season they bought three of the Group 6 Lancia LC1 chassis and set about bringing them up to Group C spec with new bodies and the turbo-engine enlarged to 1522cc. With no great difference in weight, the small engine could only get them up to 280 kp/h (175 mph). One was written off in an accident at Silverstone, but the other two arrived at Le Mans, led by current F3 champion Oscar Larrauri.

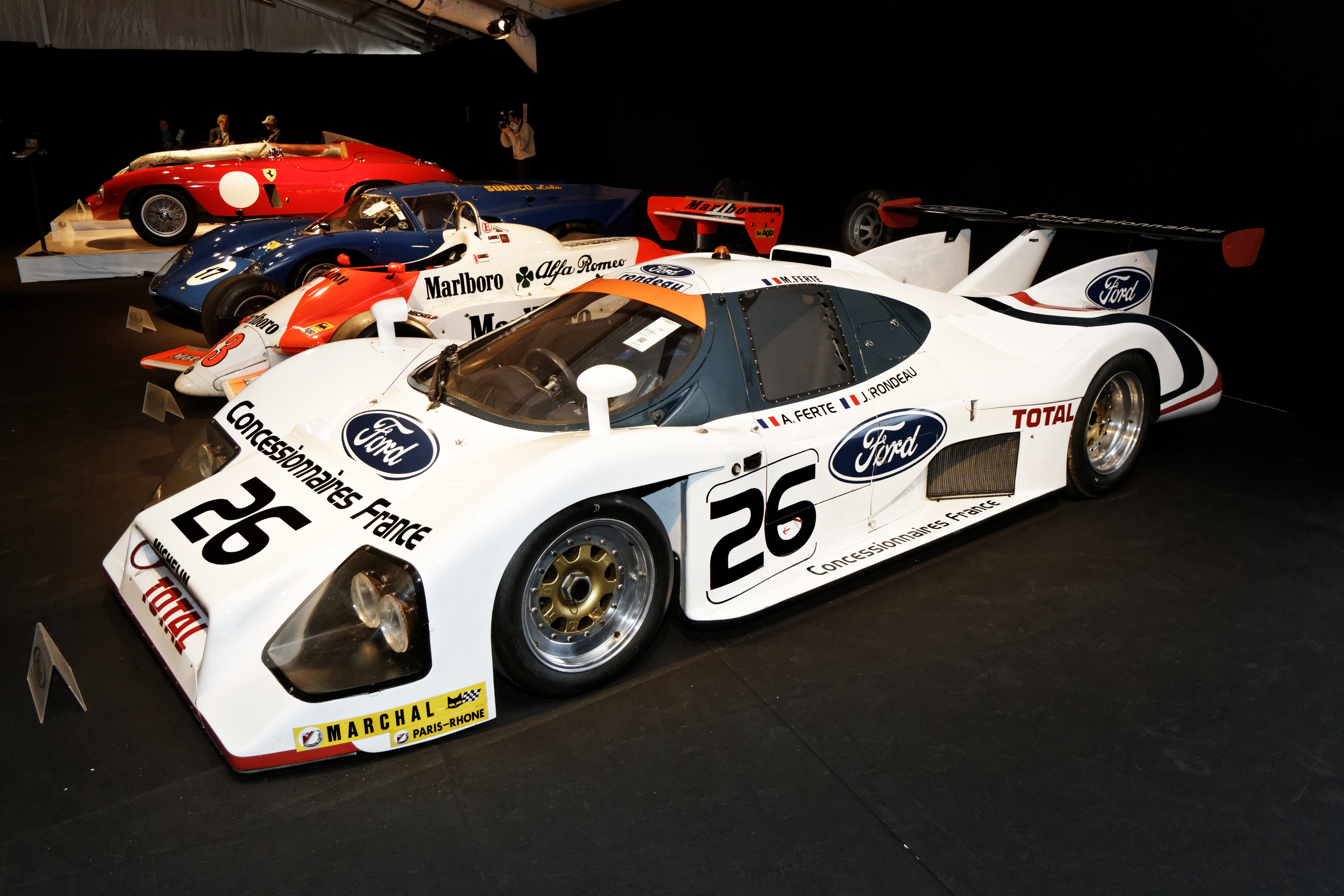
Rondeau M482

Ford had cancelled development of its under-performing C100 program in favour of a new Group C design. However, within a week of Karl Ludvigsen leaving as Ford-Europe VP, that program was also cancelled, as was improvement to the problematic Cosworth DFL engine. Irish gentleman-racer Martin Birrane wanted to move into Group C and bought one of the C100 cars that raced the previous year for his new Peer Racing team. In the absence of their parent company, the consortium of Ford France dealers put their support behind the Cosworth-powered Rondeau team. The M482 "ground-effects" project had had considerable development over the winter and the consortium purchased the three chassis. Max Sardou, who had done extensive aerodynamic work on his Ardex, the Lola T600 and March-BMW M1/C, was bought in to fine-tune the car aerodynamics. The team was managed by Pierre Dieudonné and a number of Jean Rondeau's team were brought in. Three-time winner Henri Pescarolo raced with Thierry Boutsen, newly promoted to F1 with Arrows. Jean Rondeau himself ran with the Ferté brothers, Alain and Michel while the third car had Jean-Pierre Jaussaud/Philippe Streiff.

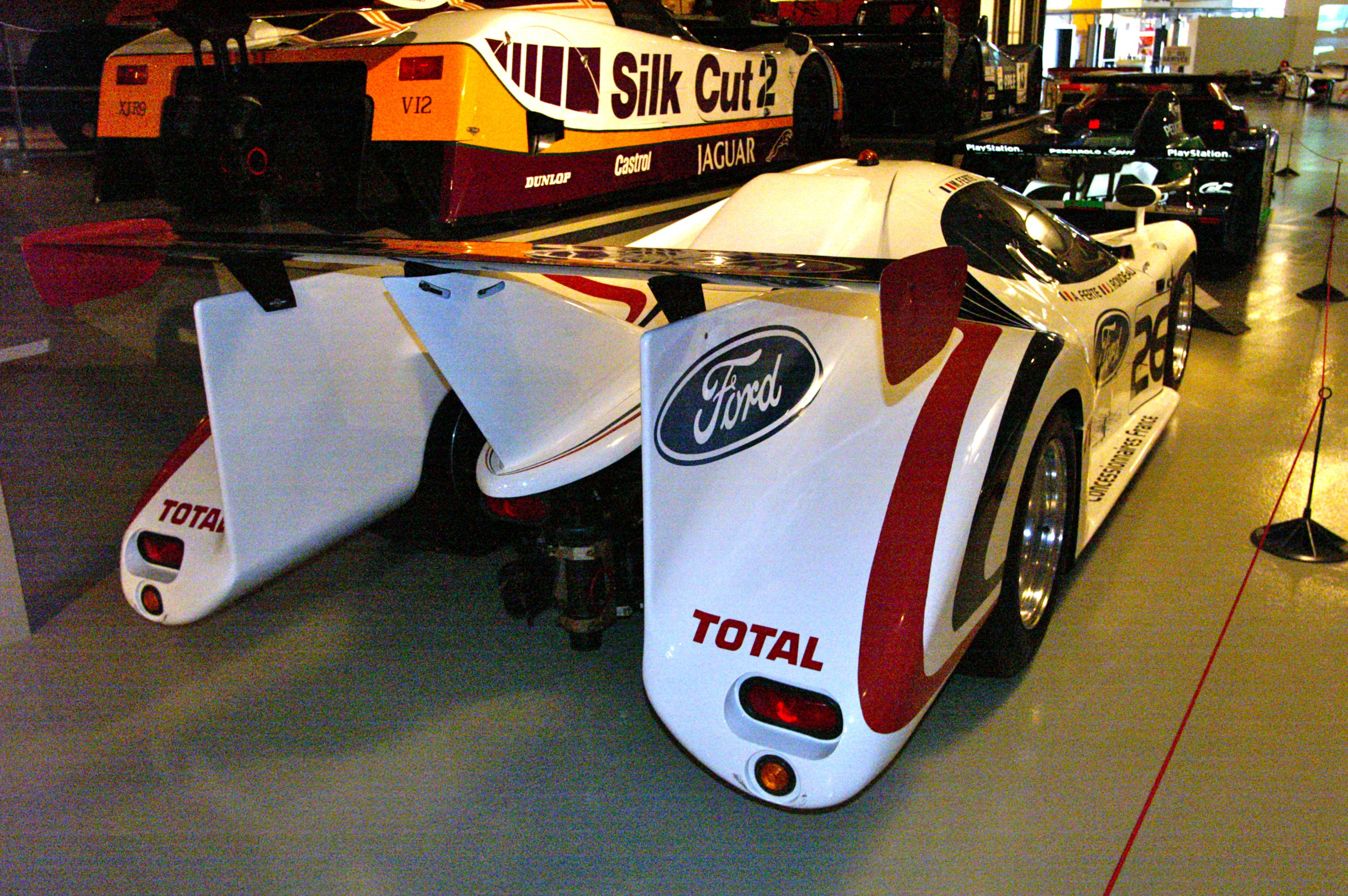
Ground-effects rear end of the Rondeau M482

Alongside these cars there were four other older-model Rondeaux entered. Two were works entries, and Jean Rondeau was able to entice 48-year old Vic Elford out of a 9-year retirement, with Anny-Charlotte Verney/Joël Gouhier. The other car (an M382) was sponsored by the local government (given car #72, the same as the Sarthe département) and the driver line-up led by Alain Cudini. There were two other M382s entered by privateers: Christian Bussi returned with his car, while Pierre Yver had upgraded from the M379C he ran last year. With limited resources, the small WM team opted out of running a full Championship season, instead choosing to focus on its home race, at Le Mans, with the new P83 model. But their persistence had paid off, with their Peugeot engine development now getting the full backing from the parent company. The 3.1-litre V6 turbo now put out 650 bhp tuned by Denis Mathiot Compétition, who was doing the set-up for the new Citroën Compétitions rally team. Le Mans local Yves Courage improved his Cougar C01 to become the C01B with revised suspension, but sticking with the Cosworth DFL. Another recent garagista, Alain de Cadenet, came on-board as a driver alongside Courage, bringing with him Murray Smith as team manager. Once again Michel Dubois was brought in as the third driver.

With Ford ceasing its work on the Cosworth DFL, Lola in turn finished their racing program with the T610. So there was only the American Lola privateer Ralph Kent-Cooke present, back for only his car's second race, after its first outing at last year's Le Mans. The works Nimrod-Aston Martin was running an IMSA campaign in America, so the only representative was the car of Viscount Downe (an Aston Martin shareholder and president of the owners' club). Considerable work had been done in the close-season, shedding a lot of weight (60 kg) and improving aerodynamics. Aston's in-house specialists, Tickford Engineering, worked up a new, more compact V8 engine for the team. With the lighter weight, the car could now reach 340 kp/h (210 mph), although at 990 kg, it was still the heaviest of the Group C cars (around 150 kg heavier than the Porsches).

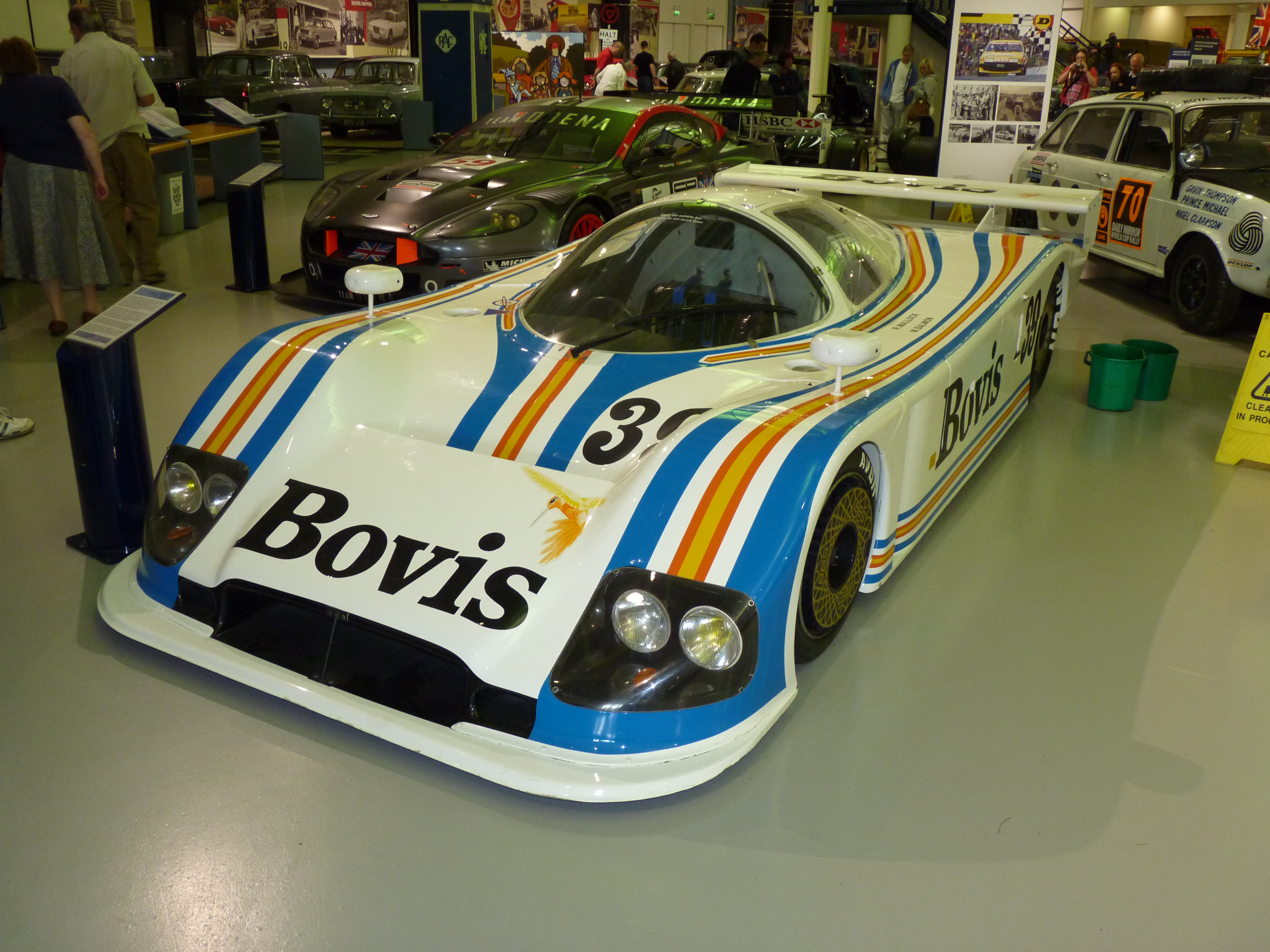
Nimrod NRA C2

The composite-technology company Seger & Hoffmann, half of the Sehcar consortium, were looking at new options away from Peter Sauber. Swiss Walter Brun had raced one of the cars the previous year and when Gerhard Schneider's GS Sport racing team fell into financial difficulty, he bought the other chassis. Seger & Hoffmann kept the intellectual property of the cars and, together with Brun, upgraded the design and built a new C83 version with a 2.7-litre turbo Porsche engine. Brun entered the polyglot threesome for Le Mans but he wrote off the BMW-powered Sehcar in a big accident that broke his arm at the Nürburgring round. As it transpired, the Sehcar-Porsche was still being finished during qualifying week. Brun would race it with regular co-driver Hans-Joachim Stuck and Harold Grohs. The remaining Sehcar-Cosworth would be raced by three Canadians: Villeneuve/Deacon/Heimrath. With the dissolution of the partnership with Seger & Hoffmann, engineer Peter Sauber's small company had to design a brand new car. The C7 was drawn up by the same Mercedes technicians who had helped him with the previous year's project. After the poor results with the Cosworth DFL engine, they turned to the BMW 3.5-litre straight-6 engine. Although with proven reliability, it was underpowered - only generating 475 bhp. Swiss driver Max Welti crashed the car while testing at Monza, so it arrived at Le Mans repaired but under-prepared for their pay-drivers Garcia/Montoya/Naon.

Having previously run BMW M1s at Le Mans, this year Steve O'Rourke (band manager for Pink Floyd) commissioned Len Bailey (formerly at Mirage) to design him a Group C car. Called the EMKA, after O'Rourke's production company, was a low, aerodynamic shape with a modified Aston Martin 5.3-litre engine V8 almost 100 kg lighter than the original, and 85 kg lighter than the Nimrod. Tuned by Aston's in-house team, Tickford Engineering, it put out 570 bhp. O'Rourke would race the car, alongside Tiff Needell and Nick Faure. Not to be outdone by his manager, Pink Floyd drummer Nick Mason bought the 1982 Dome. He employed Colin Bennett Racing (who had been running against Mason in the British F1 Championship) to upgrade the car with bigger brakes, a longer tail and improved cooling. Still very quick, it could get up to 355 kp/h (220 mph). He also secured former Dome drivers Chris Craft and Eliseo Salazar as his co-drivers.

=== Group C Junior ===
Aside from Porsche and Lancia, the only other factory team present this year was from Mazda. The Group C design was aimed for the new Junior class. The new 717C was designed by the technical team under Takuya Yura at Mazda's in-house division, Mooncraft, the chassis was of aluminium with an aerodynamic Kevlar bodyshell. The new 13B twin-rotor rotary engine was 1308cc (rated as 2.6-litres under the equivalence formula) put out 320 bhp and could get the car up to 305 kp/h (190 mph). The company's racing division, Mazdaspeed, debuted the car at the Silverstone round, and two cars were at Le Mans. Alan Docking was team manager in Europe, with British drivers Jeff Allam, Steve Soper and James Weaver in one car, while Japanese works-drivers Yojiro Terada, Yoshimi Katayama and Takashi Yorino had the new chassis, fitted with upgraded suspension. A new English car also utilised the Mazda rotary. Lester Rey designed the Harrier, with a very light aluminium monocoque chassis, and the 13B rotary was assembled at Engine Shop, Silverstone. The venture was supported by David Palmer of Mazda GB, who was also one of the drivers alongside Pierre Honegger, an American Mazda dealer running his Mazda GTP in the IMSA series.

Alba Engineering was a new Italian racing constructor, founded by Giorgio Stirano, formerly at Osella. He was asked by the Jolly Club team principals Martino Finotto and Carlo Facetti (latterly racing Lancias), to build a car for the new Junior class. The sleek AR2 was built of carbon fibre and just met the weight-limit. The engine was designed by Facetti, an experienced engineer himself but it had to called a Giannini, as the FIA required engines to come from homologated car manufacturers. It was 1914cc straight-four with a KKK-turbocharger, and could put out 420 bhp in race-trim or over 520 bhp for qualifying, getting up to 310 kp/h (190 mph). It was instantly successful, with Finotto and Facetti easily winning the class at the preceding Silverstone and Nürburgring rounds.

Another new marque seen this year was the Sthemo, which was an acronym of drivers Hubert Striebig Jacques Heuclin and designer Rudi Mössinger. The latter had worked with the team previously with the ToJ cars in the 2-litre Group 6 class. This French project was a new ground-effects design. Originally slated to use a Mazda engine, they settled for a 2.2-litre BMW engine, as the former was unavailable. Underpowered, it put out 270 bhp, but it made up for it being the lightest car in the class. This year, François Duret moved his DeCadenet-Lola down from Group C to the Junior class. Working with ADA Engineering, it got new bodywork and was lightened. Its 3-litre Cosworth DFV was prepared and tuned by John Nicholson.

=== Group B ===
Racing teams had not taken to the Porsche 924 car being developed for Group B, preferring to stay with the proven reliability of the rear-engine 911 variants. The Porsche 911 Turbo (930) had a 3.3- or 3.0-litre turbo and a multi-national six were entered. These included former 935-owners Swiss Claude Haldi and the Spanish Alméras brothers (with 3.3-litre cars) while German Edgar Dören ran the smaller engine version. They were joined by the English Charles Ivey Engineering team, Frenchman Michel Lateste and German Georg Memminger. It had been Memminger's crucial class win at the Nürburgring that had proven the difference for Porsche to win the Manufacturers' Championship over Lancia the previous year. There was only a single BMW M1 to take on the squadron of Porsches. Owned by Brun Motorsport, it was entered by prospective owner Angelo Pallavicini. As co-drivers he had Jens Winther and German royalty, Prinz "Poldi" von Bayern. Winther was successfully running his own M1 with his Team Castrol Denmark. The final entry in the class was a specially lightened Porsche 928 by French privateer Raymond Boutinard. It had a 4.7-litre V8 engine.

== Practice and Qualifying ==
Porsche came prepared for qualifying with engines fitted with larger turbos that could get wound up to 700 bhp at 1.4-bar boost. Once again, in a dominating performance, Jacky Ickx claimed his third pole-position in three years. As before, he threw down the gauntlet early in practice with a lap of 3:16.6 seconds, fully twelve seconds faster than his pole time the year before. His teammate, Jochen Mass, was second fastest after the first day, just ahead of the Lancia. The team also practiced a fourth car (#33) with Ickx qualifying it 7th, though they were not intending to race it.

Last thing on Thursday, while other teams were doing their race set-up, Lancia fitted qualifying tyres on Alboreto's car. In a strong run, with the boost cranked up to 820 bhp, he snatched second place by two-tenths of a second (3:20.8). Ghinzani was fourth having the works teams two-by-two. Their build-up had been difficult, with Alboreto blowing an engine on Wednesday on his first lap, and Ghinzani losing a gearbox on Thursday. The third car had the additional weight of a 16 kg camera for live, in-car coverage for Eurovision.

Klaus Ludwig was fifth on the grid (3:23:8), in the first of the customer Porsches. Volkert Merl recorded the highest speed in practice. Aided by an immense tow behind his team-mate Ludwig, he reached 370 kp/h (230 mph) down the Hunaudières straight. Jonathon Palmer put the Canon Porsche on 6th and the Kremer Porsche was 9th behind the other works Porsches. The effort that many teams had done on their cars in the close-season was reflected in the better lap-times. The Nimrod, losing 60 kg weight was 10 seconds faster than its time from 1982. This made it the highest-placed non-turbo on the grid, in 15th (3:35.8). It was readily apparent the normally-aspirated cars could not compete against the turbo Porsches and Lancias. They would effectively have to run at qualifying pace just to match the turbos' race-pace.

However, the Rondeau were unexpectedly slow. Sardou had done computer modelling that the cars could reach 355 kp/h (220 mph) but the best car could only get to 320 kp/h (200 mph). In fact the big air tunnels were too effective, pulling the car to the road and bottoming out. Stiffer suspension just created a bouncing "porpoising" effect making the cars exhausting to drive. Pescarolo put in the best time, but was only 17th quickest (3:36.1), twenty seconds behind Ickx. The Cooke Lola was able to match its grid time from last year, but this time is put it ten places down on the grid (27th), such was the advance in lap times.

In the C Junior class, the Jolly Club Alba confirmed its place as favourite for the class win with the fastest time (3:42.8) in class putting it 26th, in the middle of the grid. It was over 20 seconds faster than the rest of the class, led by the two Mazdas, the best of which was 41st, with a 4:05.9. A casualty of qualifying was the Harrier – on Wednesday they had suspension problems, and the next day blew its only engine. The Group B class filled out the end of the grid, with the BMW three seconds faster (4:10.4) than the Porsches.

== Race ==
=== Start ===
There was a bad omen for Roger Dorchy, whose WM had to be pushed off the grid to fix an oil-leak, and costing him almost half an hour. Mass overtook Ickx to lead the first lap, then on the second lap debutante Lammers made an opportunistic lunge for second on Ickx at the Mulsanne corner. The cars collided and both had to pit for replacement noses, costing them about 2 minutes, and almost a lap. The debacle moved Schuppan's Porsche up to restore the works 1-2. He was being chased hard by Alboreto's Lancia, then the Porsches of Ludwig, Andretti, Fitzpatrick, Merl with the other two Lancias of Ghinzani and Nannini rounding out the top-10. Casualties in the first hour included Jaussaud's Rondeau (oil leak), Richard Cleare's Kremer (blown turbo) while Birrane's Ford ran out of fuel when Migault drove too hard in the opening shift. Alboreto was in the pits with gearbox issues and finally seized up completely at Arnage at 5.30pm. Ghinzani moved into third but then dropped back with fuel problems. Nick Mason's Dome stopped on Mulsanne Straight at 6pm. With a damaged gearbox, Eliseo Salazar spent 50 minutes before he could slam it into third gear and get back to the pits.

By 8'clock, after the second stops, Bellof and Holbert had pulled away from the chasing pack. Heyer, in the Lancia was third, ahead of Johansson in the Marlboro Porsche and Bell, driving hard back up through the field. The other Joest Porsche was sixth ahead of the JFR one and the two Rondeaux of Cudini and Ferté doing well with Palmer in the Canon Porsche now back up to tenth after its second lap excursion.

As dusk started to fall at the quarter-distance mark, the Ickx/Bell car had restored the works 1-2-3, (now being led by Schuppan/Holbert/Holbert) albeit a lap behind. However, Bell flirted with disaster with his car running out of fuel as it coasted down the pitlane. The Marlboro Porsche had lost five laps with faulty plugs so the leading customer cars were the JFR car, with the Andrettis, NewMan-Joest and Skoal Bandit JFR cars behind. In fact, Porsches locked out the whole top 10 places. Behind them was the best of the rest, with the Cooke Lola now the leading non-German car in 11th, just ahead of Vic Elford's older Rondeau M379, the Sauber and the WM in 14th. In the Junior class, the Japanese-driven Mazda had been swapping the lead with the Alba regularly through the evening. The Mazda was now leading, 22nd overall, after a long fuel-stop dropped the Alba to 27th. In Group B, the BMW had held a handy lead for the first six hours of the race, until it ran into gearbox problems that cost two hours to repair. This moved the Ivey Porsche up to lead the class (19th overall) and it carried on up the top-20 during the night as others retired, well ahead of the rest of their competition.

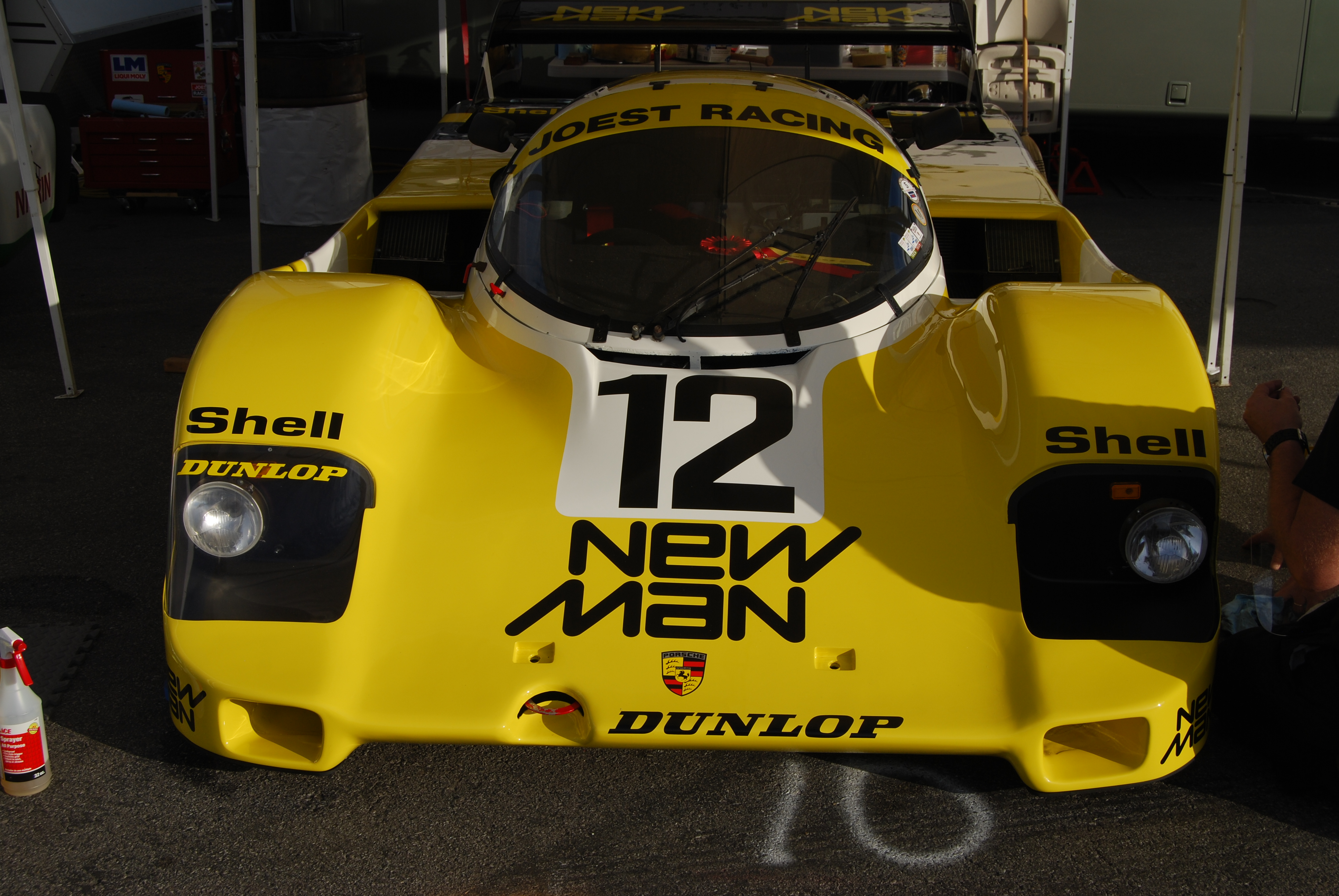
#12 Joest Porsche 956

=== Night ===
The Rothmans Porsche dominance ended at midnight when the Mass/Bellof car pulled into the pits with a sick engine. The fuel system had developed a fault, putting the car onto a full-lean mixture that eventually had holed a piston. The mechanics isolated the part and the drivers carried on with five cylinders. The JFR Porsche, the leading privateer, was still running fourth when around the same time it had to pit with a broken fuel-metering system. Repairs could not fix the issue and the car retired when it stopped out on the circuit. Team owner, John Fitzpatrick, switched across to his other team car, with Guy Edwards and John Keegan that had been 7th but soon improved up to 4th itself. Either side of 1am, the Canon-RLR Porsche, running 8th, lost half an hour each on two suspension problems. Dropping nine places, Lammers and Palmer eventually fought back to finish 8th. The Nimrod had been delayed by alternator problems, then lost 40 minutes in the evening fixing a gear selector. Then after 11pm, Earle brought the car in and another 40 minutes was spent fixing the electrics. Getting back in the race in 31st, thereafter it ran well for 9 hours. Then at 9.20am having got all the way back up to 13th, a conrod broke throwing a hole through the engine and leaving Salmon stranded out on the Indianapolis straight.

Lancia's poor weekend was finished by the early hours of Sunday morning. Just before 2am, the Ghinzani/Heyer car lost its fuel-pressure in the Porsche Curves. They could only coast as far as the Ford Chicane before coming to a terminal stop. The last team-car had pitted half an hour earlier with its turbos disintegrating. Despite labouring for three hours and several exploratory laps, the repairs proved fruitless. Solid driving by Bell and Ickx finally got them back onto the lead lap at 3am, when the leaders pitted with a puncture. Behind them were the 956 customer-teams: the Kremer Porsche of the Andretti's trailed by three laps along with the Joest Porsches and John Fitzpatrick's remaining car.

At half-distance, the position of the leading cars had stayed constant. Desiré Wilson had the Obermeier Porsche in 8th, and the Sauber was up to 9th, as the first non-turbo, non-Porsche, with the Pescarolo/Boutsen Rondeau in 10th. The Mazda, in 17th, had grown its lead over the Alba. Group B was developing into a close race, with only one retirement in the class to date. The Ivey Porsche 911 Turbo (930) (16th) was still leading, ahead of the Memminger Porsche (20th). Soon after midnight, the Alba spent over an hour in the pits repairing a broken throttle cable, and then a damaged turbo. They were able to continue through the night but as morning came they lost more time fixing the gearbox. Facetti finally retired it around 9am when chassis failure made it undriveable.

=== Morning ===
As dawn broke, all 11 Porsche 956s were still running – in the top 12 positions. By contrast no Lancias remained and only 2 of the 7 Rondeau. When interviewed, Jean Rondeau was scathing of Ford's lack of support for the Cosworth engines. Bell finally took the lead at 6.30am, but held it for only fifteen minutes, when he came to a stop at Mulsanne – a wire from his Motronic engine system had come adrift. He was able to reattach it (as the drivers had practiced) but the consequent pitstop cost them twelve minutes and five laps. The Andretti Kremer car took over second, putting a lap on the Rothmans Porsche.

It needed more hard driving by the champion pair, as they had conserved petrol in the first half of the race. In the process, Ickx set a new lap record of 3:29.1. They finally retook second place at 11.30, albeit three laps behind the team-mates. A miserable race for the Mass/Bellof works Porsche finally came to an end. on Sunday afternoon. After running on five cylinders since midnight, the engine finally gave up at a late-morning pit-stop. Although the mechanics worked for a half-hour, they could not restart the engine.

Without the precision of the Motronic system, the only hope for the privateer Porsche teams to match the works teams was on fuel economy. The Porsches were doing 14 laps as standard, and switching to the 10-litre reserve tank would often get an extra lap. Rupert Keegan inadvertently found out the fuel limit on Sunday morning. Mistakenly shown a pit-board with "14" on it, instead of "16" (meaning 16th lap, pit now), the car spluttered and was misfiring badly. Amazingly, the Fitzpatrick car was able to complete a 17th lap on 100 litres of fuel - 6.5mpg (36 L/100 km). French hopes had taken a dive when the Pescarolo/Boutsen Rondeau retired at breakfast time with engine failure, while the British fraternity lost the Nimrod due to a broken connecting rod later in the morning, after running as high as 13th.

In the late morning the two Lancia LC1s of the Scuderia Sivama pitted with major engine issues. When repairs could not solve the issues, the cars were parked up for five hours until just before 4pm when they went out to complete several laps. Unfortunately, with insufficient distance covered neither could be classified. Early in the afternoon, Klaus Ludwig, in the 4th-placed Joest Porsche spun at Tertre Rouge, as he was going onto the long back straight. With heavy damage to the right-hand side, he lost ten laps limping back to the pits and getting repairs. With no spare langheck tail sections, they had to modify the undertray to take a standard tail.

=== Finish and post-race ===
The final hours became some of the most tense in Le Mans race history – at 2.40pm Schuppan arrived at the pits with his left door missing (not the first car in this race to have this happen), compromising the integrated engine-cooling system. He ran the car for a further few laps, but soon saw the engine temperature going dangerously high and pitted. The very hot engine proved difficult to restart and Holbert took the car out gingerly. Halfway down the Mulsanne straight, the airflow began to do its job, but the makeshift door repairs broke. Holding the door with one hand, and running at a reduced pace using less revs, he was able to protect a seriously overheating engine. According to Holbert:

"When I switched on, right away I could see that the left-bank temperature gauge was reading very high. The engine was so hot on that side that there was quite a delay getting it started. When it finally fired, I just couldn't take me eyes off that gauge. I was really worried about it.

Then halfway down Mulsanne, the faster airflow began to get to the rad and I saw the gauge begin to drop. I thought maybe we were OK now, and we had a new door. But right away the makeshift door fixing broke! I grabbed hold of the door and held on. But when I was midway through the slower sections, through Indianapolis and Arnage and on to the Porsche Curve, well, that gauge started to rise again...

So here's what I decided to do: find a pace which would keep us alive, cooling the engine down Mulsanne, keeping the revs down in the slower sections. I found that the door wasn't too much of a problem. I got down to a pace at which I could control the temperature and I could maintain it without too much difficulty.

He settled down to a 3:45 lap. However, he was now only a lap ahead of the reinvigorated Bell, who had just taken over from Ickx and doing 3:30-3:33 laps. But all was not well with the number 1 car either, with the team recommending changing brake discs as both of the front pads were cracked. Knowing that time taken would definitely lose them the race, Bell chose to trust his ability and his car, and carry on.

"A couple of minutes later, I was out on the circuit, through Tertre Rouge and onto the Mulsanne straight. As soon as the speed built up I realised what Jacky had been saying. The front brakes were so out of balance that I had to hang on to the steering wheel for dear life down the straight. When I arrived at the brow I had to start changing down through the gears, slowing the car from 220mph largely on the transmission. I just made it through the corner each time."

Holbert came in for his final fuel stop at 3.25pm and the mechanics fitted a leather strap to secure the door. He had been managing his speed, but team manager Roland Kussmaul told him he would have to go faster with Bell closing. While Holbert was refuelling, Bell unlapped himself. He was power-sliding out of the corners with virtually no brakes. Meanwhile, Holbert saw that both the temperature gauges were in the red. With just two minutes to go, at Arnage, they suddenly dropped to zero, meaning no more water was getting into the engine. Coming onto the front straight, without its water, the engine seized. Holbert was desperately able to bump-start it again, with a big puff of white smoke as he passed the pits. He made it round one more painful lap to take the chequered flag and pulled over straight away. Bell arrived just 64 seconds later and also pulled over, having had to switch to his reserve tank halfway round the lap. Neither car would likely have been able to do another one.

The customer-Porsche teams filled out most of the top-10. The Kremer Porsche came in third, five laps behind the winners. Having covered five more laps than last year's winner, it was only later that Mario Andretti realised he came within minutes of attaining the remarkable achievement of winning the Triple Crown – matching a feat only done by Graham Hill, by winning the Formula 1 Championship, the Indianapolis 500 and the Le Mans 24 Hours. The Joest team were fourth and sixth, while the John Fitzpatrick car split them, in fifth. With ten minutes to go, the JFR team had a late scare, having to replace the front brake unit. They managed to get it done in time to complete a final lap.

The only non-Porsche to finish in the top-10 was the Sauber C7. Running 7th by 7am, the team had stayed out of trouble, aside from a half-hour stop to fix the exhaust, and finished a creditable ninth. The Charles Ivey Porsche followed up their Group 5 class-victory last year by finishing 11th overall and winning the Group B GT class this year. For John Cooper, it was his third class-victory in three years. The winner of the C Junior class was the Japanese-driven Mazda. Aside from two punctures, their run was trouble-free and the reward was twelfth overall, and the best fuel economy in the race: of over 9mpg (26 L/100 km). They had spent most of the afternoon in close proximity to their stablemate, which had lost over an hour early in the race on Saturday fixing bodywork after a tyre exploded at top speed on the Mulsanne straight. Christian Bussi's Rondeau M382 came in 19th, having lost time with two gearbox rebuilds. The Primagaz Rondeau of Pierre Yver had run solidly in the top-20 through the first half of the race. Come the new day, it was afflicted with electrical problems several times. Despite new batteries, the issues persisted. Yver parked the car for 45 minutes until driving out to complete the final lap. Unfortunately, the engine stopped with just metres to go at the Ford Chicane. He got out and pushed it over the lined but that caused his disqualification.

It was a well-earned result for the veteran Vern Schuppan. After eleven attempts had yielded two seconds, he became only the second Australian to win the race after Bernard Rubin, way back in 1928 for Bentley. As Jacky Ickx put it:

"It was a very exciting Le Mans, for sure. We both felt the frustration of catching up several times but being disturbed each time by a mechanical problem. But being second in these circumstances - well, it's quite acceptable, you know? Perhaps the others were lucky but, with no doubt, Derek and I have had our share of good luck in previous years."

Porsche easily won the Manufacturer's Championship, and Jacky Ickx narrowly beat his team-mate Derek Bell for the Driver's Championship. Bob Wollek went onto win the revived European Endurance Championship with Joest. If possible, this was arguably an even more dominant victory for Porsche than the previous year's result. Sweeping the top-eight positions was the best result ever for a single marque, beating the achievement of Ferrari in 1963, twenty years earlier, when they took the top six positions overall. It would be a daunting, and expensive prospect for any manufacturer to take on the German marque with a competitive car. By stark contrast, the small Rondeau team found their Group C challenger, the M482, a dismal failure. Having won Le Mans only three years earlier, the company was placed in receivership by the end of the year.

== Official results ==
=== Finishers ===
Results taken from Quentin Spurring's book, officially licensed by the ACO
Class winners are in Bold text.

Pos	Class	No.	Team	Drivers	Chassis	Engine	Tyre	Laps
1	**Gr.C**	**3**	**(West Germany) Rothmans Porsche**	**(Australia) Vern Schuppan** **(United States) Hurley Haywood** **(United States) Al Holbert**	Porsche 956	Porsche 935/79 2.6L F6 twin turbo	D	371
2	Gr.C	1	(West Germany) Rothmans Porsche	(Belgium) Jacky Ickx (United Kingdom) Derek Bell	Porsche 956	Porsche 935/79 2.6L F6 twin turbo	D	371
3	Gr.C	21	(West Germany) Porsche Kremer Racing	(United States) Mario Andretti (United States) Michael Andretti (France) Philippe Alliot	Porsche 956	Porsche 935/79 2.6L F6 twin turbo	G	365
4	Gr.C	12	(West Germany) Sorga Joest Racing	(West Germany) Volkert Merl (West Germany) Clemens Schickentanz (Colombia) Mauricio de Narváez	Porsche 956	Porsche 935/79 2.6L F6 twin turbo	M	362
5	Gr.C	16	(United Kingdom) John Fitzpatrick Racing	(United Kingdom) John Fitzpatrick (United Kingdom) Guy Edwards (United Kingdom) Rupert Keegan	Porsche 956	Porsche 935/79 2.6L F6 twin turbo	G	359
6	Gr.C	8	(West Germany) Sorga Joest Racing	(West Germany) Klaus Ludwig (Sweden) Stefan Johansson (France) Bob Wollek	Porsche 956	Porsche 935/79 2.6L F6 twin turbo	D	355
7	Gr.C	18	(West Germany) Obermaier Racing	(West Germany) Jürgen Lässig (West Germany) Axel Plankenhorn (South Africa) Desiré Wilson	Porsche 956	Porsche 935/79 2.6L F6 twin turbo	D	348
8	Gr.C	14	(United Kingdom) Canon Racing (United Kingdom) Richard Lloyd Racing	(United Kingdom) Richard Lloyd (United Kingdom) Jonathan Palmer (Netherlands) Jan Lammers	Porsche 956	Porsche 935/79 2.6L F6 twin turbo	D	340
9	Gr.C	46	Sauber Team Switzerland	(Colombia) Diego Montoya (United States) Tony Garcia (United States) Albert Naon	Sauber C7	BMW M88 3.5L S6	D	339
10	Gr.C	47	(United States) T-Bird Swap Shop (United Kingdom) John Fitzpatrick Racing	(United States) Preston Henn (France) Jean-Louis Schlesser (France) Claude Ballot-Léna	Porsche 956	Porsche 935/79 2.6L F6 twin turbo	G	328
11	**Gr.B**	**93**	**(United Kingdom) Charles Ivey Racing** (private entrant)	**(United Kingdom) John Cooper** **(United Kingdom) Paul Smith** **(United Kingdom) David Ovey**	Porsche 911 Turbo (930)	Porsche 930/60 3.3L F6 turbo	D	304
12	**Gr.C Jnr**	**60**	(Japan) Mazdaspeed	(Japan) Yojiro Terada (Japan) Yoshimi Katayama (Japan) Takashi Yorino	Mazda 717C	Mazda 13B 1308cc twin-rotary	D	303
13	Gr.B	92	(West Germany) G. Memminger (private entrant)	(West Germany) Georg Memminger (West Germany) Heinz Kuhn-Wiess (West Germany) Fritz Müller	Porsche 911 Turbo (930)	Porsche 930/60 3.3L F6 turbo	D	300
14	Gr.C	54	(France) V. Bertapelle (private entrant)	(France) Bruno Sotty (France) Gérard Cuynet	URD C81	BMW M88 3.5L S6	D	293
15	Gr.B	95	(France) Equipe Alméras Frères (private entrant)	(France) Jacques Alméras (France) Jean-Marie Alméras (France) Jacques Guillot	Porsche 911 Turbo (930)	Porsche 930/60 3.3L F6 turbo	M	280
16	Gr.C	10	(France) WM Secateva	(France) Roger Dorchy (France) Alain Courdec (France) Pascal Fabre	WM P83	Peugeot PRV ZNS4 3.1L; V6 twin-turbo	M	279
17	Gr.C	41	(United Kingdom) EMKA Productions Ltd.	(United Kingdom) Tiff Needell (United Kingdom) Steve O'Rourke (United Kingdom) Nick Faure	EMKA C83/1	Aston Martin 5.3L V8	D	276
18	Gr.C Jnr	61	(Japan) Mazdaspeed	(United Kingdom) Steve Soper (United Kingdom) Jeff Allam (United Kingdom) James Weaver	Mazda 717C	Mazda 13B 1308cc twin-rotary	D	268
19	Gr.C	29	(France) C. Bussi (private entrant)	(Belgium) Pascal Witmeur (Belgium) Jean-Paul Libert (Belgium) Daniel Herregods	Rondeau M382	Cosworth DFL 3.3L V8	D	266
20	Gr.B	96	(France) M. Lateste (private entrant)	(France) Raymond Touroul (France) Michel Lateste (France) Michel Bienvault	Porsche 911 Turbo (930)	Porsche 930/60 3.3L F6 turbo	M	265
N/C*	Gr.C	51	(Italy) Scuderia Sivama Motor Griffone	(Argentina) Oscar Larrauri (Italy) Massimo Sigala (Morocco) Max Cohen-Olivar	Lancia LC1	Lancia 1522cc S4 turbo	D	218
N/C*	Gr.C Jnr	65	(United Kingdom) ADA Engineering (France) François Duret (private entrant)	(France) François Duret (United Kingdom) John Sheldon (United Kingdom) Ian Harrower	De Cadenet-Lola LMC	Cosworth DFV 3.0 L V8	M	215
N/C*	Gr.B	97	(France) R. Boutinaud (private entrant)	(France) Raymond Boutinaud (France) Patrick Gonin (France) Alain le Page	Porsche 928 S	Porsche 4.7L V8	D	135
N/C*	Gr.C	53	(France) A.S. École Supérieure de Tourisme (private entrant)	(France) François Hesnault (France) Thierry Perrier (France) Bernard Salam	Lancia LC1	Lancia 1522cc S4 turbo	D	133

- Note *: Not Classified because did not cover sufficient distance (70% of the winner) by the race's end.

=== Did Not Finish ===
Pos	Class	No	Team	Drivers	Chassis	Engine	Tyre	Laps	Reason
DNF	Gr.C	2	(West Germany) Rothmans Porsche	(West Germany) Jochen Mass (Germany) Stefan Bellof	Porsche 956	Porsche 935/79 2.6L F6 twin turbo	D	281	Engine (22hr)
DSQ	Gr.C	30	(France) Compagnie Primagaz (private entrant)	(France) Lucien Guitteny (France) Pierre Yver (Belgium) Bernard de Dryver	Rondeau M382	Cosworth DFL 3.3 L V8	D	266	Pushed over finish-line (24hr)
DNF	Gr.C	39	(United Kingdom) Viscount Downe Racing (private entrant) (United Kingdom) Pace Petroleum	(United Kingdom) Ray Mallock (United Kingdom) Mike Salmon (United States) Steve Earle	Nimrod NRA/C2B	Aston Martin DP1229 5.3L V8	A	218	Engine (18hr)
DNF	Gr.B	94	(Switzerland) C. Haldi (private entrant)	(Switzerland) Claude Haldi (West Germany) Günther Steckkönig (West Germany) Bernd Schiller	Porsche 911 Turbo (930)	Porsche 930/60 3.3L F6 turbo	M	217	Engine (22hr)
DNF	Gr.B	90	(Switzerland) A. Pallavicini (private entrant) (Switzerland) Brun Motorsport	(Switzerland) Angelo Pallavicini (West Germany) Prinz Leopold von Bayern (Denmark) Jens Winther	BMW M1	BMW M88 3.5L S6	D	180	Gearbox (16hr)
DNF	Gr.C	24	Ford Concessionaires France	(France) Henri Pescarolo (Belgium) Thierry Boutsen	Rondeau M482	Cosworth DFL 4.0L V8	M	174	Engine (13hr)
DNF	Gr.C	20	(United States) Cooke Racing	(United States) Ralph Kent-Cooke (United States) Jim Adams (France) François Sérvanin	Lola T610	Cosworth DFL 4.0L V8	G	165	Engine (13hr)
DNF	Gr.C Jnr	63	(Italy) Scuderia Jolly Club	(Italy) Carlo Facetti (Italy) Martino Finotto (Switzerland) Marco Vanoli	Alba AR2	Giannini Carma FF 1914cc S4 turbo	P	158	Chassis (17hr)
DNF	Gr.C	28	(France) Automobiles Jean Rondeau	(United Kingdom) Vic Elford (France) Anny-Charlotte Verney (France) Joël Gouhier	Rondeau M379C	Cosworth DFV 3.0 L V8	A	136	Engine (11hr)
DNF	Gr.C	6	(Italy) Martini Racing	(Italy) Alessandro Nannini (Italy) Paolo Barilla (France) Jean-Claude Andruet	Lancia LC2	Ferrari 268C 2.6L V8 twin turbo	D	135	Engine (14hr)
DNF	Gr.C	5	(Italy) Martini Racing	(Italy) Piercarlo Ghinzani (Germany) Hans Heyer	Lancia LC2	Ferrari 268C 2.6L V8 twin turbo	D	135	Engine (11hr)
DNF	Gr.C	9	(France) WM Secateva	(France) Jean-Daniel Raulet (France) Michel Pignard (Belgium) Didier Theys	WM P83	Peugeot PRV ZNS4 3.1L; V6 twin-turbo	M	102	Engine (12hr)
DNF	Gr.C	26	Ford Concessionaires France	(France) Jean Rondeau (France) Alain Ferté (France) Michel Ferté	Rondeau M482	Cosworth DFL 4.0L V8	M	90	Engine (14hr)
DNF	Gr.C	11	(United Kingdom) John Fitzpatrick Racing	(United Kingdom) John Fitzpatrick (United Kingdom) David Hobbs (Austria) Dieter Quester	Porsche 956	Porsche 935/79 2.6L F6 twin turbo	G	135	Fuel pump (11hr)
DNF	Gr.C	13	(France) Courage Compétition (France) Compagnie Primagaz	(France) Yves Courage (United Kingdom) Alain de Cadenet (France) Michel Dubois	Cougar C01B	Cosworth DFL 3.3L V8	M	86	Engine (12hr)
DNF	Gr.C	22	(West Germany) Porsche Kremer Racing	(United Kingdom) Derek Warwick (France) Patrick Gaillard (Germany) Frank Jelinski	Porsche C-K5	Porsche 935 3.0 L F6 twin turbo	G	76	Engine (6hr)
DNF	Gr.C	38	(Japan) Dome Racing (United Kingdom) Colin Bennett Racing (private entrant)	(Chile) Eliseo Salazar (United Kingdom) Chris Craft (United Kingdom) Nick Mason	Dome RC82i	Cosworth DFL 3.3L V8	D	75	Clutch (8hr)
DNF	Gr.C Jnr	64	(France) H. Striebig (private entrant)	(France) Hubert Striebig (France) Noël del Bello (France) Jacques Heuclin	Sthemo SM01	BMW M12 2.2L S4	D	71	Engine (16hr)
DNF	Gr.C	49	(United Kingdom) GRID Racing	(United States) Fred Stiff (United Kingdom) Dudley Wood (United States) Ray Ratcliff	Grid-Plaza S1	Cosworth DFL 4.0L V8	F	69	Oil leak (6hr)
DNF	Gr.C	36	(Switzerland) Brun Motorsport	(Canada) Jacques-Joseph Villeneuve (Canada) Ludwig Heimrath Jnr (Canada) David Deacon	Sehcar C6	Cosworth DFL 4.0L V8	D	68	Radiator (8hr)
DNF	Gr.C	72	(France) Automobiles Jean Rondeau	(France) Alain Cudini (France) Dany Snobeck (France) Xavier Lapeyre	Rondeau M382	Cosworth DFL 3.3L V8	M	31	Engine (5hr)
DNF	Gr.C	4	(Italy) Martini Racing	(Italy) Michele Alboreto (Italy) Teo Fabi	Lancia LC2	Ferrari 268C 2.6L V8 twin turbo	D	27	Gearbox (4hr)
DNF	Gr.C	43	(United Kingdom) Peer Racing (private entrant)	(France) François Migault (Republic of Ireland) David Kennedy (Republic of Ireland) Martin Birrane	Ford C100	Cosworth DFL 3.3L V8	G	16	Out of fuel (3hr)
DNF	Gr.C	25	Ford Concessionaires France	(France) Jean-Pierre Jaussaud (France) Philippe Streiff	Rondeau M482	Cosworth DFL 3.3L V8	M	12	Oil leak (3hr)
DNF	Gr.C	15	(West Germany) Joest Racing Belga Team	(Belgium) Jean-Michel Martin (Belgium) Philippe Martin (Belgium) Marc Duez	Porsche 936CJ	Porsche 935 2.6L F6 twin-turbo	D	9	Fuel system (2hr)
DNF	Gr.C	42	(United Kingdom) Richard Cleare Racing (private entrant)	(United Kingdom) Richard Cleare (United Kingdom) Tony Dron (United Kingdom) Richard Jones	Porsche C-K5	Porsche 935 3.0 L F6 turbo	D	8	Turbocharger (5hr)
DNF	Gr.B	91	(West Germany) E. Dören (private entrant)	(France) Alain Yvon (France) Jean-Marie Lemerle (West Germany) Michael Krankenberg	Porsche 911 Turbo (930)	Porsche 930/60 3.3L F6 turbo	D	7	Gearbox (3hr)

=== Did Not Start ===
Pos	Class	No	Team	Drivers	Chassis	Engine	Tyre	Reason
DNS	Gr.C	33	(West Germany) Rothmans Porsche	(Belgium) Jacky Ickx (Australia) Vern Schuppan (West Germany) Jürgen Barth	Porsche 956	Porsche 935/79 2.6L F6 twin turbo	D	Test-car
DNS	Gr.C	37	(Switzerland) Brun Motorsport	(Switzerland) Walter Brun (West Germany) Harold Grohs (West Germany) Hans-Joachim Stuck	Sehcar C83	Porsche 935/76 2.7L F6 twin turbo	D	Driveshaft
DNQ	Gr.C Jnr	62	(United Kingdom) Manns Racing (private entrant)	(United Kingdom) David Palmer (United States) Pierre Honegger (United Kingdom) Roy Baker	Harrier RX83C	Mazda 13B 1308cc twin-rotary	A	Did not qualify
DNA	Gr.C	17	(United Kingdom) Tiga Racing Services	(New Zealand) Howden Ganley (Australia) Neil Crang	Tiga GC83	Chevrolet 5.0L V8		Did not arrive
DNA	Gr.C	19	(United States) Cooke Racing		Lola T600	Chevrolet 5.8L V8	G	Did not arrive
DNA	Gr.C	27	(France) Automobiles Jean Rondeau		Rondeau M382	Cosworth DFL 3.3L V8	M	Did not arrive
DNA	Gr.C	31	(France) Courage Compétition	(France) Yves Courage (United Kingdom) Alain de Cadenet (France) Michel Dubois	Cougar C02	Cosworth DFL 3.3L V8	M	Car not ready
DNA	Gr.C	32	(United Kingdom) March Racing		March 83G	Porsche 935/76 2.7L F6 twin turbo		Did not arrive
DNA	Gr.C	34	(Switzerland) Cheetah Cars	(Switzerland) Loris Kessel (Switzerland) Florian Veitsch (France) Laurent Ferrier	Cheetah G603	Cosworth DFL 3.3L V8		Did not arrive
DNA	Gr.C	35	(Switzerland) Brun Motorsport	(Switzerland) Walter Brun (West Germany) Hans-Joachim Stuck	Sehcar C83	BMW M88 3.2L S6	D	Car too damaged
DNA	Gr.C	40	(United Kingdom) Nimrod Racing Automobiles		Nimrod NRA/C2	Aston Martin DP1229 5.3L V8		Did not arrive
DNA	Gr.C	48	(United Kingdom) GRID Racing	(Spain) Emilio de Villota	Grid S2	Porsche 930/72 2.9L F6 twin turbo		Car not ready
DNA	Gr.C	50	(United States) North American Racing Team		Ferrari 512BB-C	Ferrari 4.9L F12		Did not arrive
DNA	Gr.C	52	(Italy) Scuderia Sivama Motor Griffone	(United States) Joe Castellano (Italy) Diulio Truffo	Lancia LC1	Lancia 1522cc S4 turbo	D	Did not arrive

=== Class Winners ===
Class	Winning car	Winning drivers
Group C	#3 Porsche 956	Schuppan / Holbert / Haywppd
Group C Junior	#60 Mazda 717C	Terada / Katayama / Yorino *
Group B	#93 Porsche 911 Turbo (930)	Cooper / Smith / Ovey *

- Note: setting a new class distance record.

=== Index of Energy Efficiency ===
Pos	Class	No	Team	Drivers	Chassis	Score
1	Gr.C	3	(West Germany) Rothmans Porsche	(Australia) Vern Schuppan (United States) Hurley Haywood (United States) Al Holbert	Porsche 956	1.132
2	Gr.C	1	(West Germany) Rothmans Porsche	(Belgium) Jacky Ickx (United Kingdom) Derek Bell	Porsche 956	1.095
3	Gr.C	8	(West Germany) Sorga Joest Racing	(West Germany) Klaus Ludwig (Sweden) Stefan Johansson (France) Bob Wollek	Porsche 956	1.076
4	Gr.C	14	(United Kingdom) Canon Racing (United Kingdom) Richard Lloyd Racing	(United Kingdom) Richard Lloyd (United Kingdom) Jonathan Palmer (Netherlands) Jan Lammers	Porsche 956	1.019
5	Gr.C	21	(West Germany) Porsche Kremer Racing	(United States) Mario Andretti (United States) Michael Andretti (France) Philippe Alliot	Porsche 956	0.964
6	Gr.C	46	Sauber Team Switzerland	(Colombia) Diego Montoya (United States) Tony Garcia (United States) Albert Naon	Sauber C7	0.947
7	Gr.C	12	(West Germany) Sorga Joest Racing	(West Germany) Volkert Merl (West Germany) Clemens Schickentanz (Colombia) Mauricio de Narváez	Porsche 956	0.887
8	Gr.C	18	(West Germany) Obermaier Racing	(West Germany) Jürgen Lässig (West Germany) Axel Plankenhorn (South Africa) Desiré Wilson	Porsche 956	0.882
9	Gr.C	16	(United Kingdom) John Fitzpatrick Racing	(United Kingdom) John Fitzpatrick (United Kingdom) Guy Edwards (United Kingdom) Rupert Keegan	Porsche 956	0.881
10	Gr.C	47	(United States) T-Bird Swap Shop (United Kingdom) John Fitzpatrick Racing	(United States) Preston Henn (France) Jean-Louis Schlesser (France) Claude Ballot-Léna	Porsche 956	0.863

- Note: Only the top ten positions are included in this set of standings.

=== Statistics ===
Taken from Quentin Spurring's book, officially licensed by the ACO

- Pole Position –J. Ickx, #1 Porsche 956– 3:16.6secs; 249.6 km/h (155.1 mph)
- Fastest Lap – J. Ickx, #1 Porsche 956– 3:29.1secs; 233.9 km/h (145.3 mph)
- Winning Distance – 5,047.93 km (3,136.64 mi)
- Winner's Average Speed – 210.33 km/h (130.69 mph)
- Attendance – 200,000

Citations
