= Sauber C3 =

Racing car

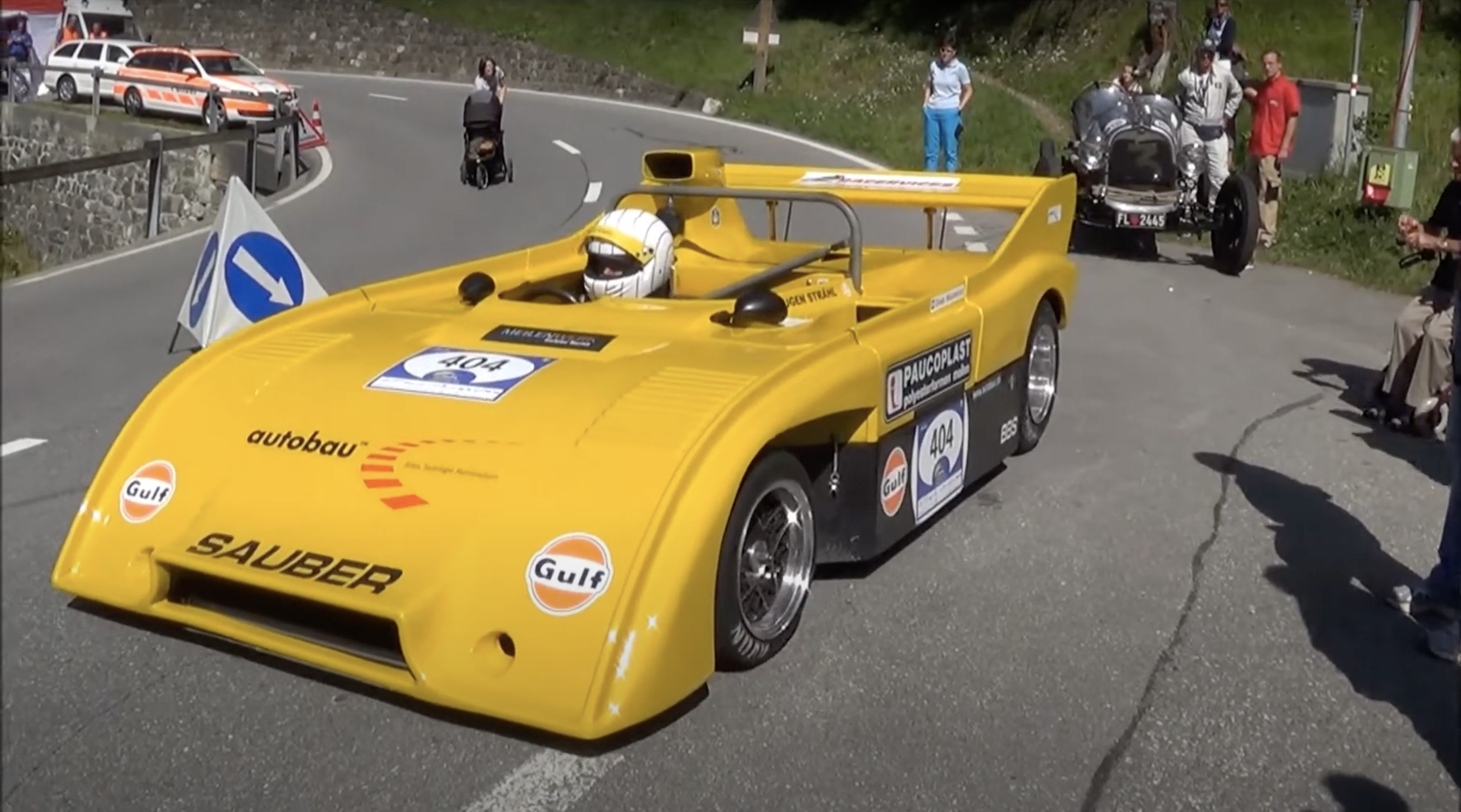
- Constructor: Sauber
- Designers: Peter Sauber; Guy Boisson
- Predecessor: Sauber C2
- Successor: Sauber C4

Technical specifications
- Chassis: Tubular spaceframe
- Suspension (front): Double wishbones, coil springs over dampers, anti-roll bar
- Suspension (rear): Twin lower links, Single top links, twin trailing arms, Coil springs over Dampers, Anti-roll bar
- Engine: Cosworth BDG, 2.0 L (122.0 cu in), L4, DOHC, NA
- Transmission: Hewland FGA 400 5-speed manual
- Power: 280 hp (209 kW)
- Weight: 660 kg (1,460 lb)

Competition history
- Debut: 1973
Wins	Podiums	Poles
1	7	1

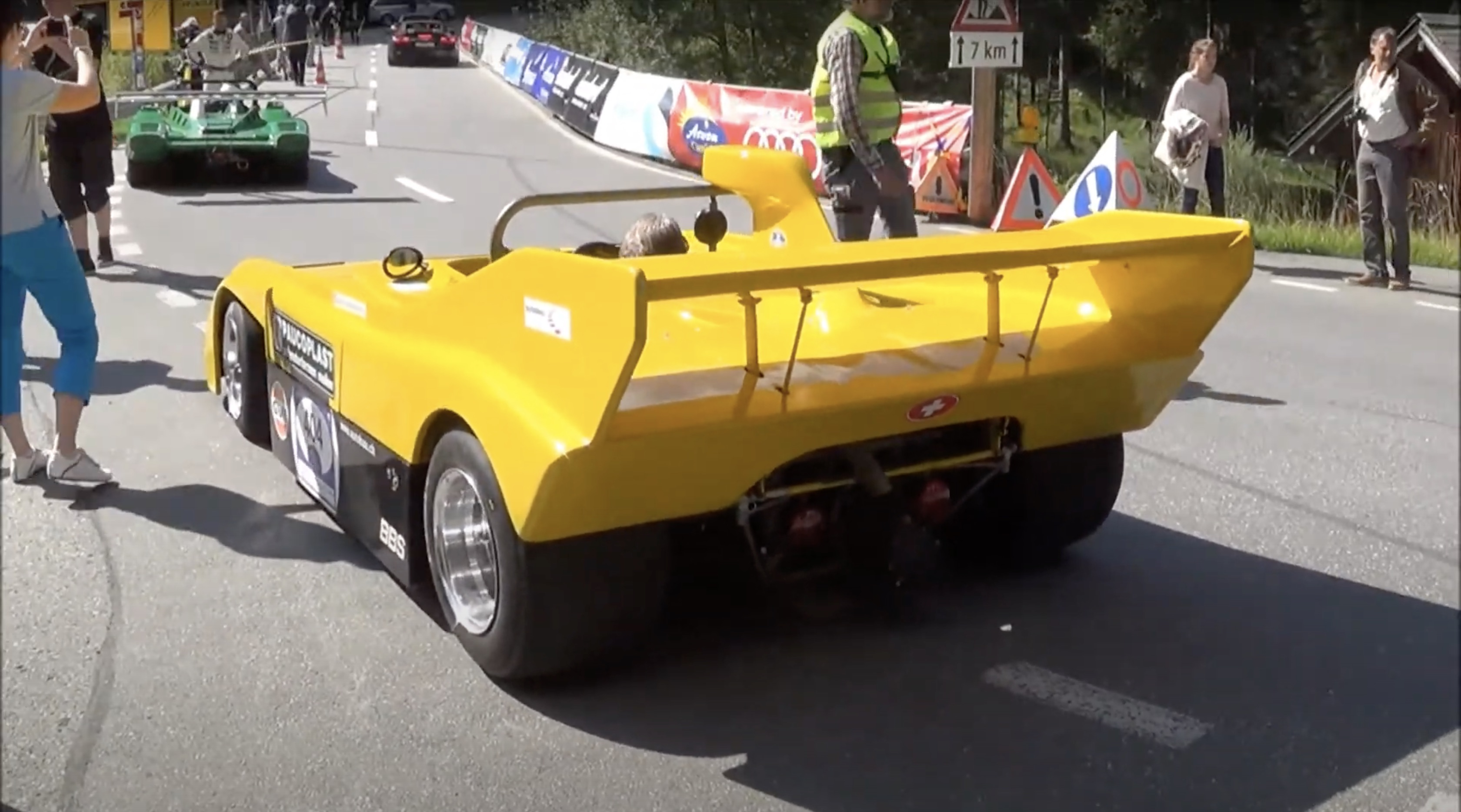
Sauber C3 rear

The Sauber C3 was the third sports prototype racing car that Swiss Peter Sauber designed and developed. It was built in 1973. It scored one race win, seven podium finishes, clinched one pole position, and achieved three additional wins in its class. It was powered by a naturally aspirated 2.0 L (120 cu in) Ford-Cosworth BDG four-cylinder engine, developing 280 hp (210 kW).
