= Sauber C5 =

Racing automobile

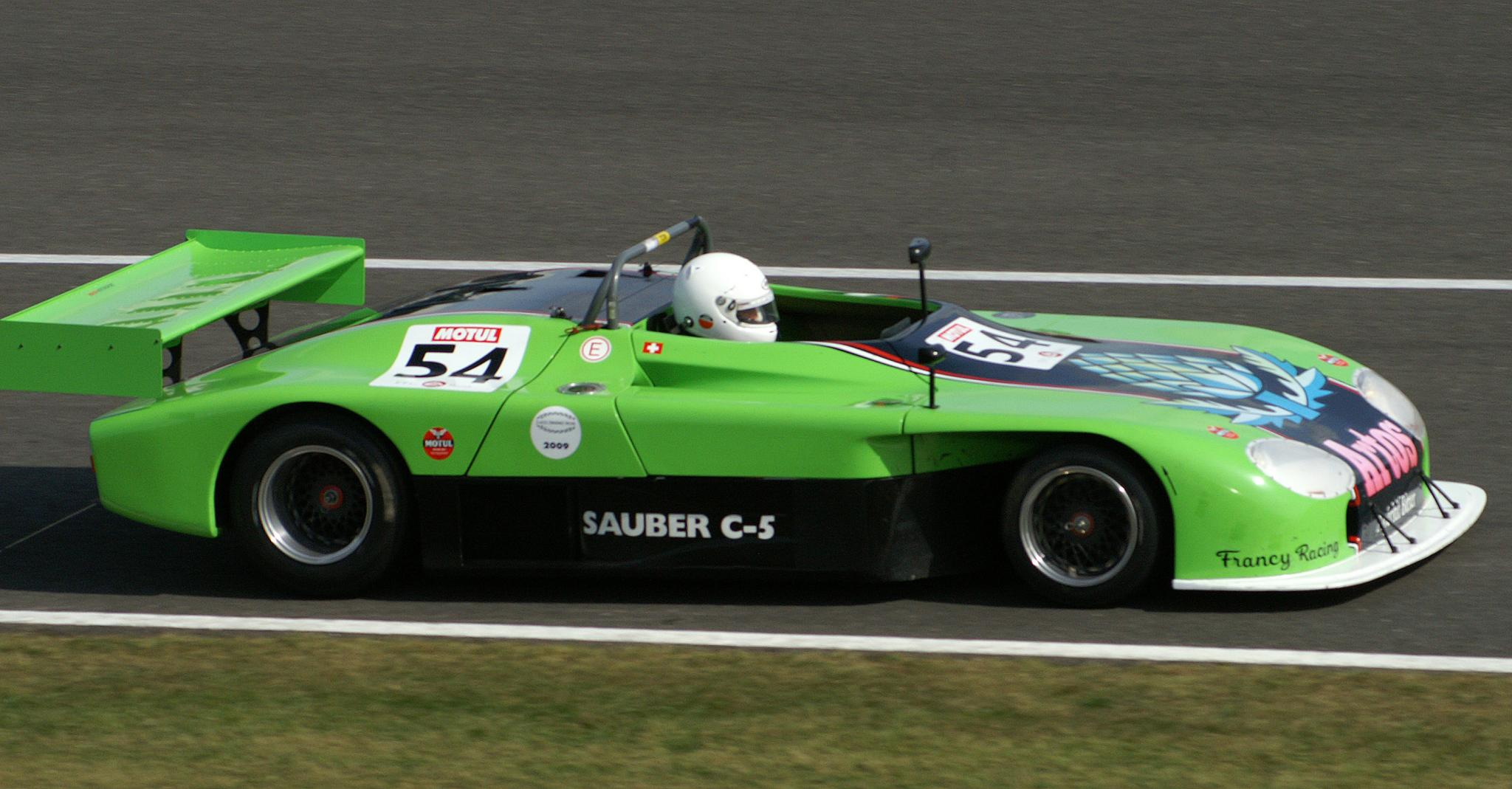
- Category: Group 6
- Constructor: Sauber
- Designers: Peter Sauber; Guy Boisson; Edi Wyss
- Production: 1975-1978
- Predecessor: Sauber C4
- Successor: Sauber SHS C6

Technical specifications
- Chassis: Aluminum Monocoque covered in Fiberglass panel body
- Suspension (front): Double wishbones, Coil springs over Dampers, Anti-roll bar
- Suspension (rear): Twin lower links, Single top links, twin trailing arms, Coil springs over Dampers, Anti-roll bar
- Axle track: 1,470 mm (58 in) (front); 1,450 mm (57 in) (rear)
- Wheelbase: 2,420 mm (95 in)
- Engine: BMW M12, 2.0 L (122.0 cu in), L4, NA
- Transmission: Hewland FGA 400 5-speed manual
- Power: 300 hp (224 kW)
- Weight: 630 kg (1,390 lb)

Competition history
- Debut: 1975
Wins	Podiums	Poles
15	31	1

The Sauber C5 is a Group 6 prototype racing car, designed, developed and built by the Swiss Sauber team, specifically made to compete in the 1977 24 Hours of Le Mans and the 1978 24 Hours of Le Mans. It is powered by a naturally aspirated 300 hp (220 kW) BMW M12 four-cylinder engine. It scored 15 race wins, 31 podiums, clinched 1 pole position, and 6 wins in its class. With these statistics, it makes it one of the most successful early Sauber sports cars.

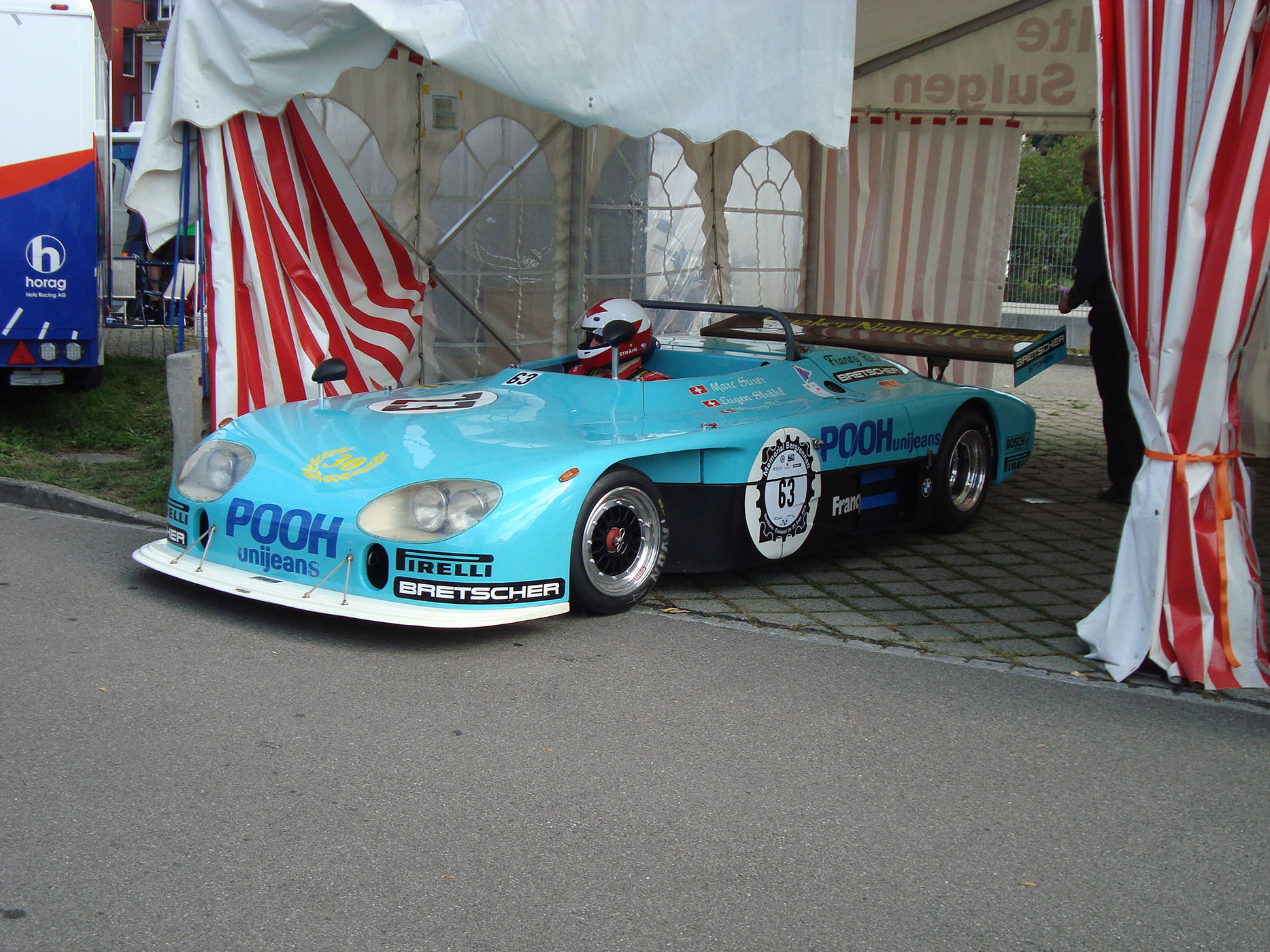
Eugen Strähl at the wheel of a Sauber C5 in 2015.
