= Sauber C4 =

Racing car

- Constructor: Sauber
- Designers: Peter Sauber; Guy Boisson
- Predecessor: Sauber C3
- Successor: Sauber C5

Technical specifications
- Chassis: Aluminum Monocoque covered in fiberglass panel body
- Suspension (front): Double wishbones, Coil springs over Dampers, Anti-roll bar
- Suspension (rear): Twin lower links, Single top links, twin trailing arms, Coil springs over Dampers, Anti-roll bar
- Engine: Cosworth BDG, 2.0 L (122.0 cu in), L4, DOHC, NA
- Transmission: Hewland FGA 400 5-speed manual
- Power: 275 hp (205 kW)

Competition history
- Debut: 1973
Wins	Podiums
1	5

The Sauber C4 was the fourth sports prototype racing car that Swiss Peter Sauber designed and developed. It was built in 1975. It competed in the European 2-Litre Sportscar Championship, where it managed to score 1 win and 5 podium finishes. It was powered by the same naturally aspirated 2.0 L (120 cu in) Ford-Cosworth BDG four-cylinder engine as its predecessor, developing 275 hp (205 kW).
