= Sauber C2 =

Racing car

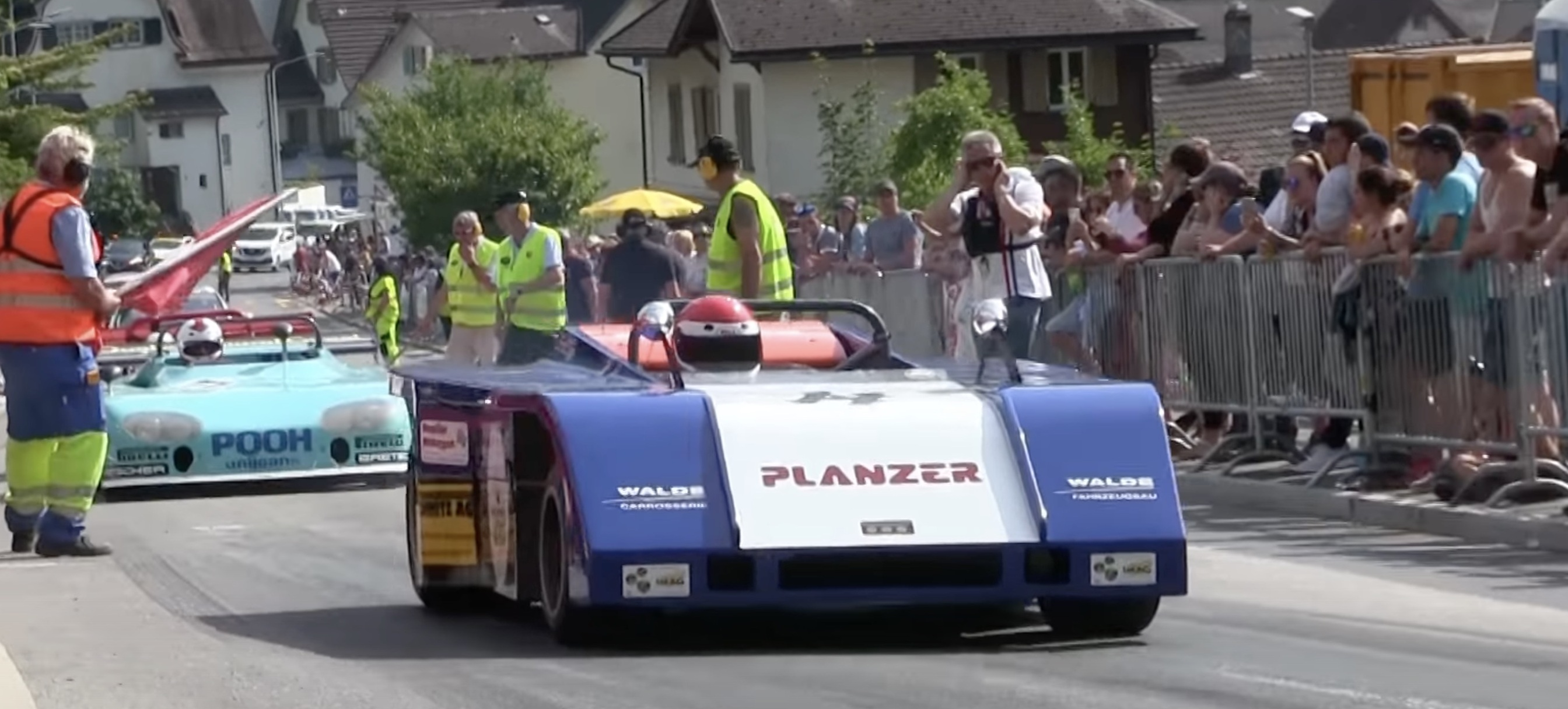
- Constructor: Sauber
- Predecessor: Sauber C1
- Successor: Sauber C3

Technical specifications
- Chassis: Tubular spaceframe
- Suspension (front): Double wishbones, Coil springs over Dampers, Anti-roll bar
- Suspension (rear): Twin lower links, Single top links, twin trailing arms, Coil springs over Dampers, Anti-roll bar
- Length: 3,296 mm (129.8 in)
- Width: 2,000 mm (79 in)
- Height: 880 mm (35 in)
- Axle track: 1,355 mm (53.3 in) (front); 1,535 mm (60.4 in) (rear)
- Wheelbase: 2,260 mm (89 in)
- Engine: Cosworth BDA, 1.6 L (97.6 cu in), L4, DOHC, NA
- Transmission: Hewland FGA 400 5-speed manual
- Power: 240 hp (179 kW)
- Weight: 480 kg (1,060 lb)

Competition history
- Debut: 1971
Wins	Podiums
3	7

The Sauber C2 was the second prototype racing car that Swiss Peter Sauber designed and developed. It was built in 1971. It scored three race wins and seven podium finishes. It was powered by a naturally aspirated 1.6 L (98 cu in) Ford-Cosworth BDA four-cylinder engine, with 240 hp (180 kW). It was also very light, weighing only 480 kg (1,060 lb).
