= Sauber C1 =

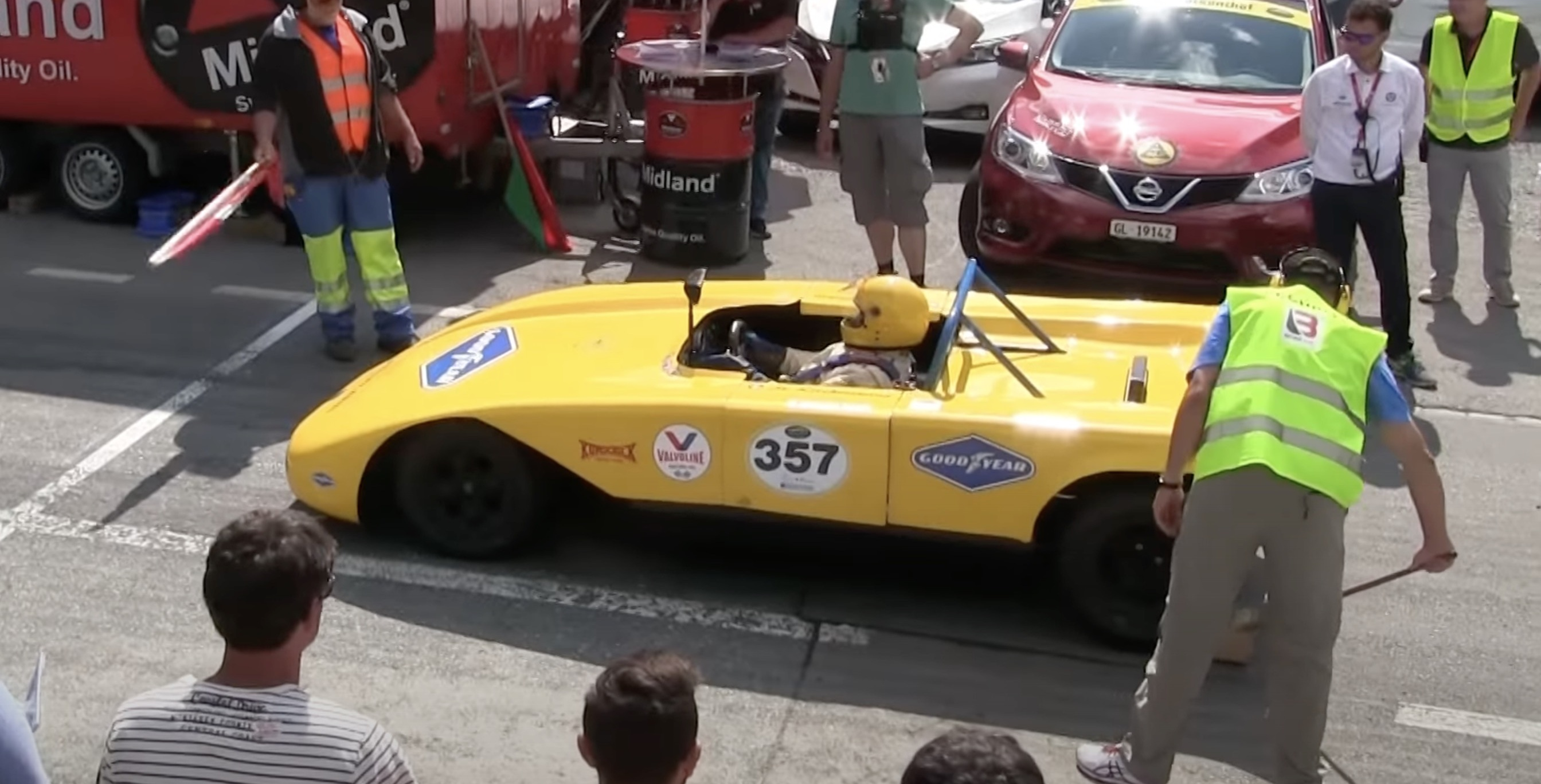
- Constructor: Sauber Motorsport
- Designer: Peter Sauber
- Successor: Sauber C2

Technical specifications

Competition history

The Sauber C1 was the first racing car that the Swiss Peter Sauber designed and built in 1970 at the age of 26 in his parents' basement in Zurich.

== Development ==
Peter Sauber chose the designation C1 after the first letter of his wife Christiane's first name and kept it for the racing car series that followed later. The self-constructed chassis made of a tubular space frame with double triangular wishbones, stabilizers, telescopic and gas pressure shock absorbers was supplemented by Brabham parts. The C1 was powered by an 85 kW (115 hp) 1 L (61 cu in) 4-cylinder Cosworth engine with dry-sump lubrication.

Peter Sauber raced the car himself for Sauber Motorsport and won the 1970 Swiss Sports Car Championship. In 1974 Friedrich Hürzeler became champion with the C1 sports car. Only two examples of the C1 were produced. They raced under different drivers in international competitions until 1983.

In 1971 the Sauber C2 followed with a 1,600 cc (98 cu in) four-cylinder engine.

In 2013, a C1 took part in the historic mountain race for the International Edelweiß Bergpreis Roßfeld in Berchtesgaden.
