= Tiga GC83 =

- Category: Group C1/C2
- Designer: Mike Coughlan

Technical specifications
- Chassis: Aluminum honeycomb monocoque, fiberglass body
- Suspension: Double wishbones, rocker actuated coil springs and shock absorbers, anti-roll bar (front); Double wishbones, coil springs over shock absorbers, anti-roll bar (rear)
- Length: 4,750 mm (187 in)
- Width: 1,896 mm (74.6 in)
- Axle track: 1,600 mm (63 in) (front); 1,499 mm (59.0 in) (rear)
- Wheelbase: 2,550 mm (100 in)
- Engine: Ford-Cosworth DFL 3.3 L (201.4 cu in) 90° DOHC V8 naturally-aspirated mid-engined Ford-Cosworth DFV 3.0 L (183.1 cu in) 90° DOHC V8 naturally-aspirated mid-engined Chevrolet 5.0 L (305.1 cu in) 90° DOHC V8 naturally-aspirated mid-engined
- Transmission: Hewland 5-speed manual
- Power: ~ 490 hp (370 kW)
- Weight: 798 kg (1,759 lb)
- Tires: Avon; Goodyear

Competition history
- Debut: 1983 1000 km of Imola

The Tiga GC83 is a sports prototype race car, designed, developed, and built by British manufacturer Tiga Race Cars, for sports car racing, conforming to the Group C1/C2 rules and regulations, in 1983.
