= Radius rod =

Suspension link

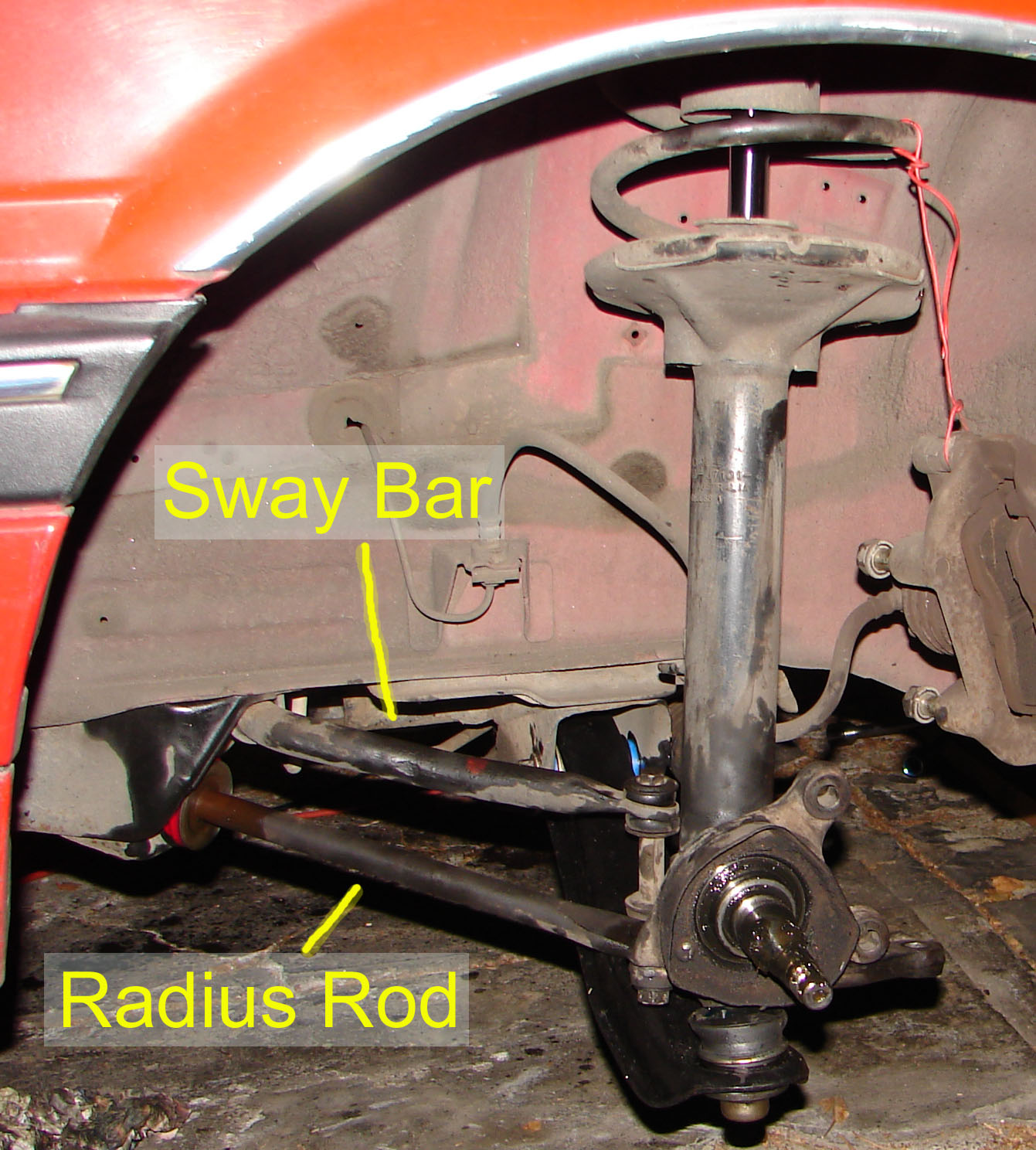
280ZX front suspension

A radius rod (also called a radius arm, torque arm, torque spring, and torsion bar) is a suspension link intended to control wheel motion in the longitudinal (fore-aft) direction. The link is connected (with a rubber or solid bushing) on one end to the wheel carrier or axle, on the other to the chassis or unibody of the vehicle. Radius rods are typically mounted ahead of the wheel. In that position they resist dive under braking forces and wheel hop under acceleration.

Radius rods are also sometimes used in aircraft with fixed (non retractable) undercarriages. Radius rods in aircraft must be regularly inspected because their failure will cause unrestrained swerving of the wheel.

Radius rods are customarily made of stamped steel or aluminum for lightness, as they are part of the vehicle's unsprung weight. Improvements in composite materials technology make possible plastic suspension links, although they are still uncommon.

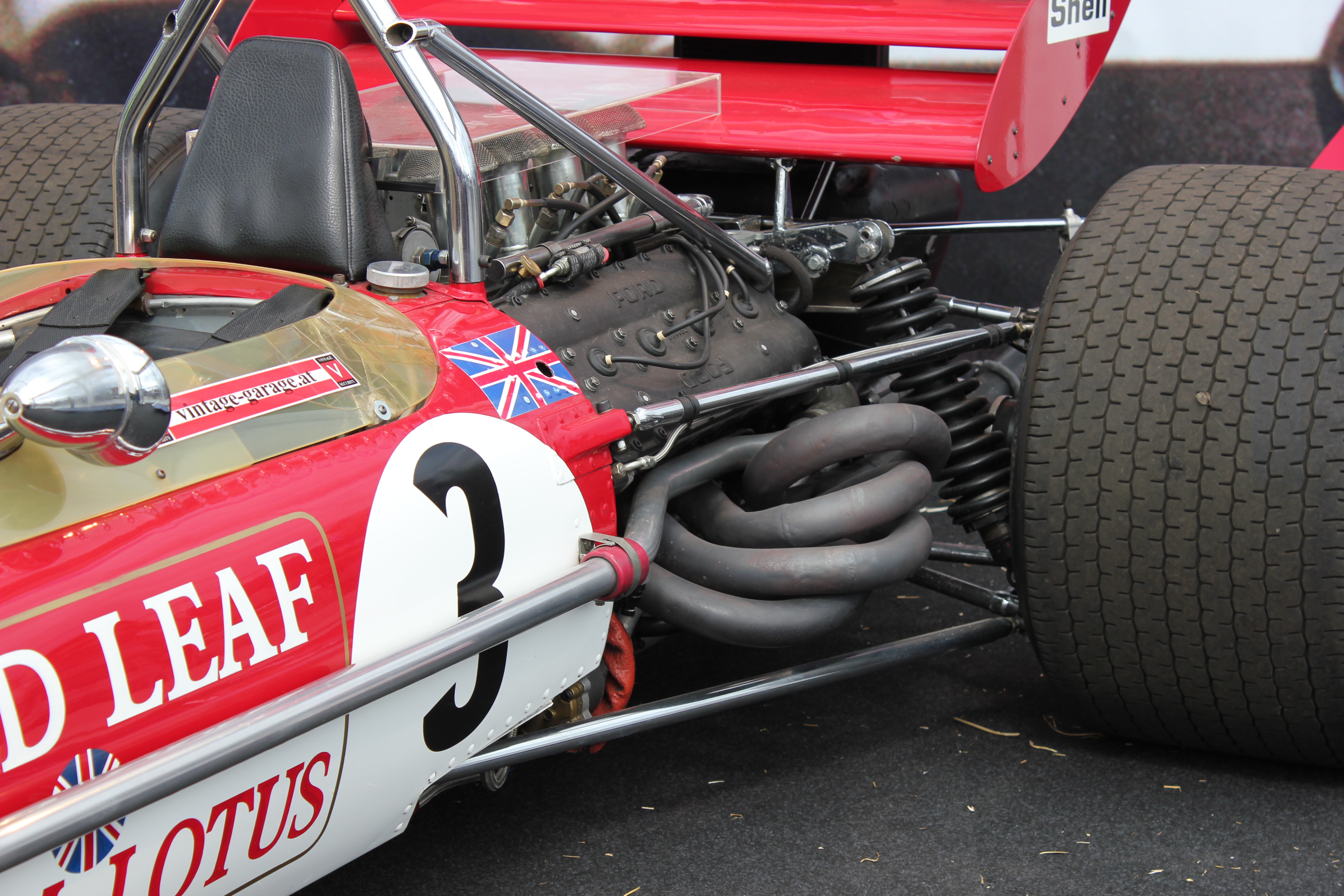
Upper and lower radius rods, either side of the exhaust pipe cluster, on a Lotus 49C race car

Other suspension components can be made to act as radius rods under certain conditions. For example, the rear suspension of the original 1966 Oldsmobile Toronado used shock absorbers to connect the rear beam axle to the frame; these shocks controlled longitudinal wheel movement, but their damping action prevented the forces of those movements from being felt by the passengers.

On a vehicle with longitudinal leaf springs, such as a Hotchkiss drive suspension, the springs themselves provide some longitudinal wheel control. One or more torque arms may be added to provide supplementary wheel control, particularly for vehicles with strong torque such as drag racers. On some leaf spring-equipped vehicles, such as 1960s Chrysler Corporation cars, the springs are mounted so that a lesser portion of the spring's length is forward of the wheels, improving wheel control on acceleration. A side effect of such positioning is that the longer, aft portion of the springs may not be stiff enough to control wheel movement under braking forces, which can lead to pronounced wheel hop in hard stops.
