= Peter Sauber =

Swiss motorsport executive (born 1943)

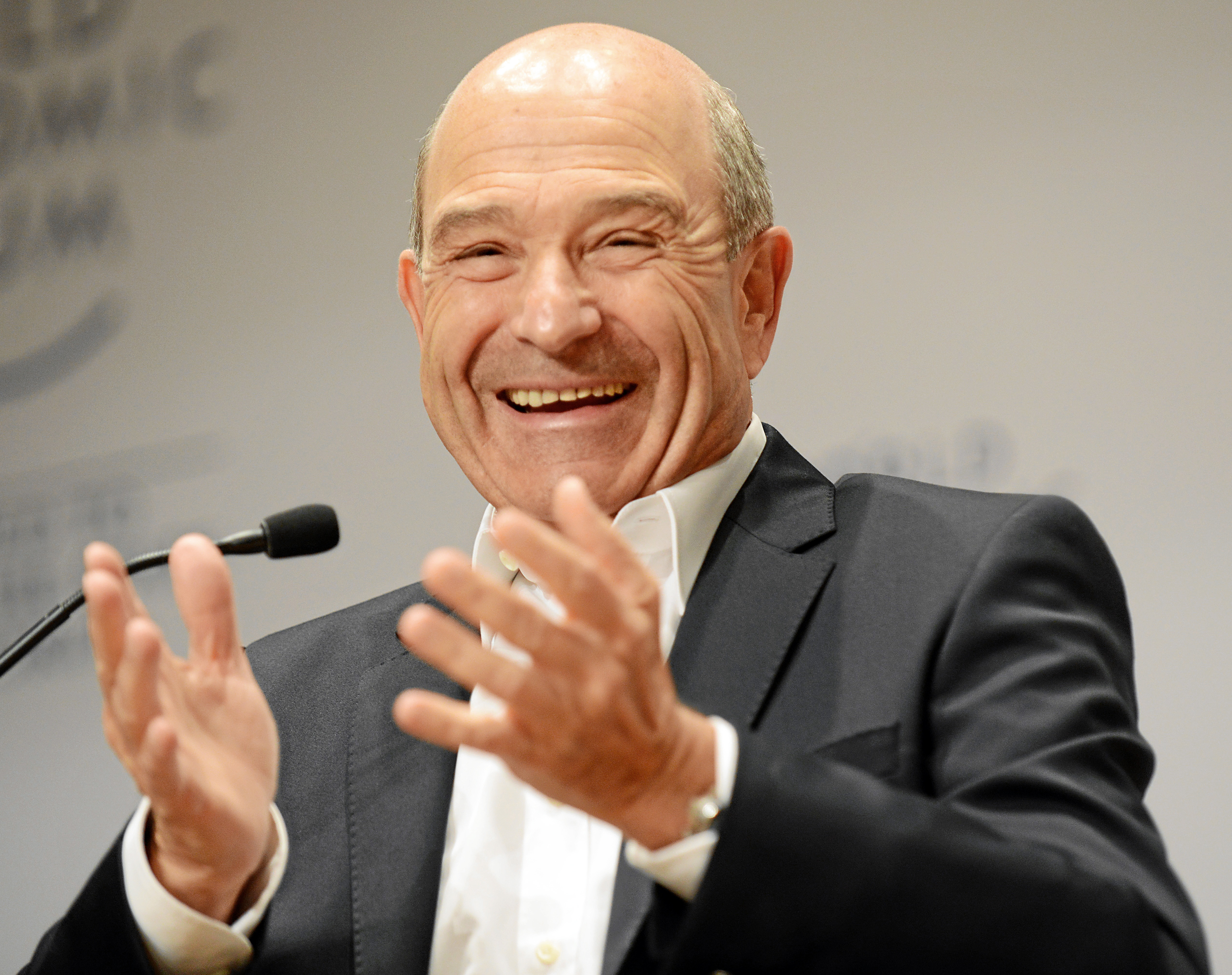
- Sauber at the World Economic Forum Annual Meeting in 2013
- Born: 13 October 1943 (age 83); Zürich, Switzerland
- Known for: Founder of Sauber F1

Peter Paul Sauber (born 13 October 1943) is a Swiss retired motorsport executive. He was the team principal and owner of various motorsports teams, most visibly the eponymous Sauber Formula One team.

== Motorsport career ==
After being trained as an electrician, Sauber became a car salesman in Hinwil, Switzerland. This was Sauber's first real association with automobiles and it proved to be the catalyst for his involvement in motorsports. He competed in hillclimbing events in a Volkswagen Beetle he had purchased, and thus the foundations for his first project as a team owner were laid.

=== Team Sauber ===
After opting not to run the family traffic light business, Peter built the Sauber C1 (the C stands for Christiane, the name of his wife) in his parents' basement. It was a car of tubular frame, powered by a 1-litre Ford Cosworth engine. He subsequently drove it to the 1970 Swiss hillclimb championship. It also remained in racing for ten years in the hands of other drivers, notably Friedrich Hürzeler, who took the 1974 crown in the car.

In 1971, Sauber handed over the driver's seat to Hans Kunis, who drove the new Sauber C2 model in the same series, as Sauber himself had done so the year before. Sauber had started to gain a portfolio of customers and in 1973, Sauber built three C3 spec chassis for different customers. Designed by Guy Boisson, the car was used predominantly in the Swiss Sports Car Championship.

The C4 of 1975 heralded the first aluminium chassis developed by the team, and Boisson was joined by Edy Wiss in designing it. Only one C4 was ever produced.

The most successful of the early Sauber cars, the C5 was used to great effect in conjunction with its 2-litre BMW engine—taking the 1976 Interserie Championship in the hands of Herbert Muller. Being a Group 6 sports car, the car was allowed to take part in the legendary 24 Hours of Le Mans, and Sauber entered the C5 in both 1977 and 1978. In '77 the car led its class before retiring; the same thing happened in '78.

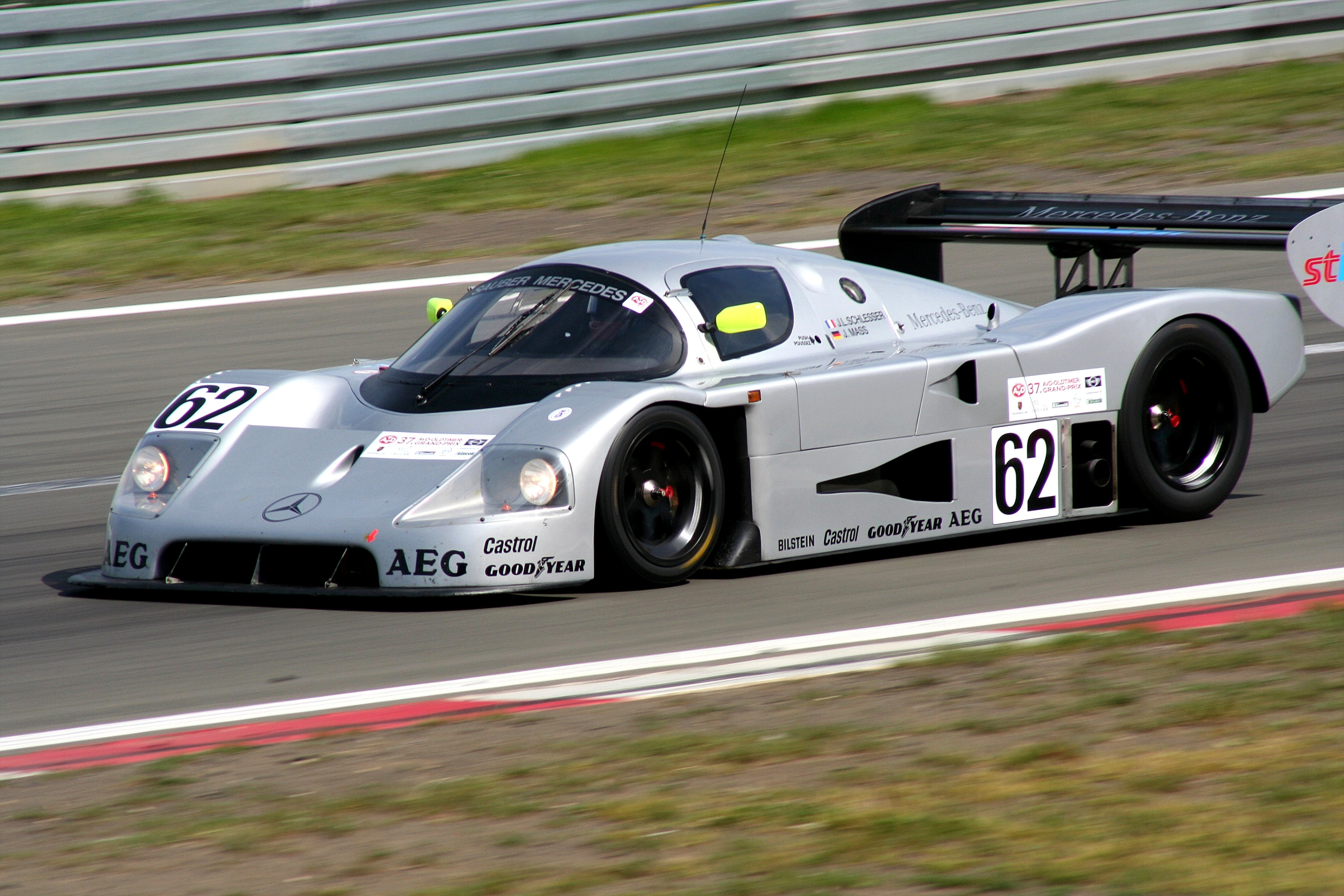
A Sauber-Mercedes C9 (built in 1988), the former Schlesser/Mass car, at the 2009 Oldtimer Grand Prix

The year 1979 marked the end of Sauber's first foray into sports car building – and the start of preparing chassis for Lola F2 cars. The drivers finished 1–2–4 in the championship that year – one of them was Max Welti, who subsequently joined the team as team manager.

In 1980, and 1981, Sauber and Welti turned their attention to developing BMW M1 sportscars, in the latter year it won the 1000km Nürburgring.

In 1982, with BASF sponsorship, Sauber returned to sports car racing. The C6 was the first car to be tested in a wind tunnel by Sauber. It was during these tests that Sauber built up a strong relationship with Leo Ress, who would later become instrumental in the F1 project.

In 1985, the team's relationship with Mercedes-Benz began. This sports car partnership culminated in November 1991 – having ignited the career of Michael Schumacher and Sauber's own protégé, Karl Wendlinger.

=== Formula One ===
Sauber now began to look seriously at launching an F1 team. In the summer of 1991 Harvey Postlethwaite joined the team to design an F1 car and Mercedes funded a vast new factory at Hinwil.

==== First Sauber team (1991–2005) ====
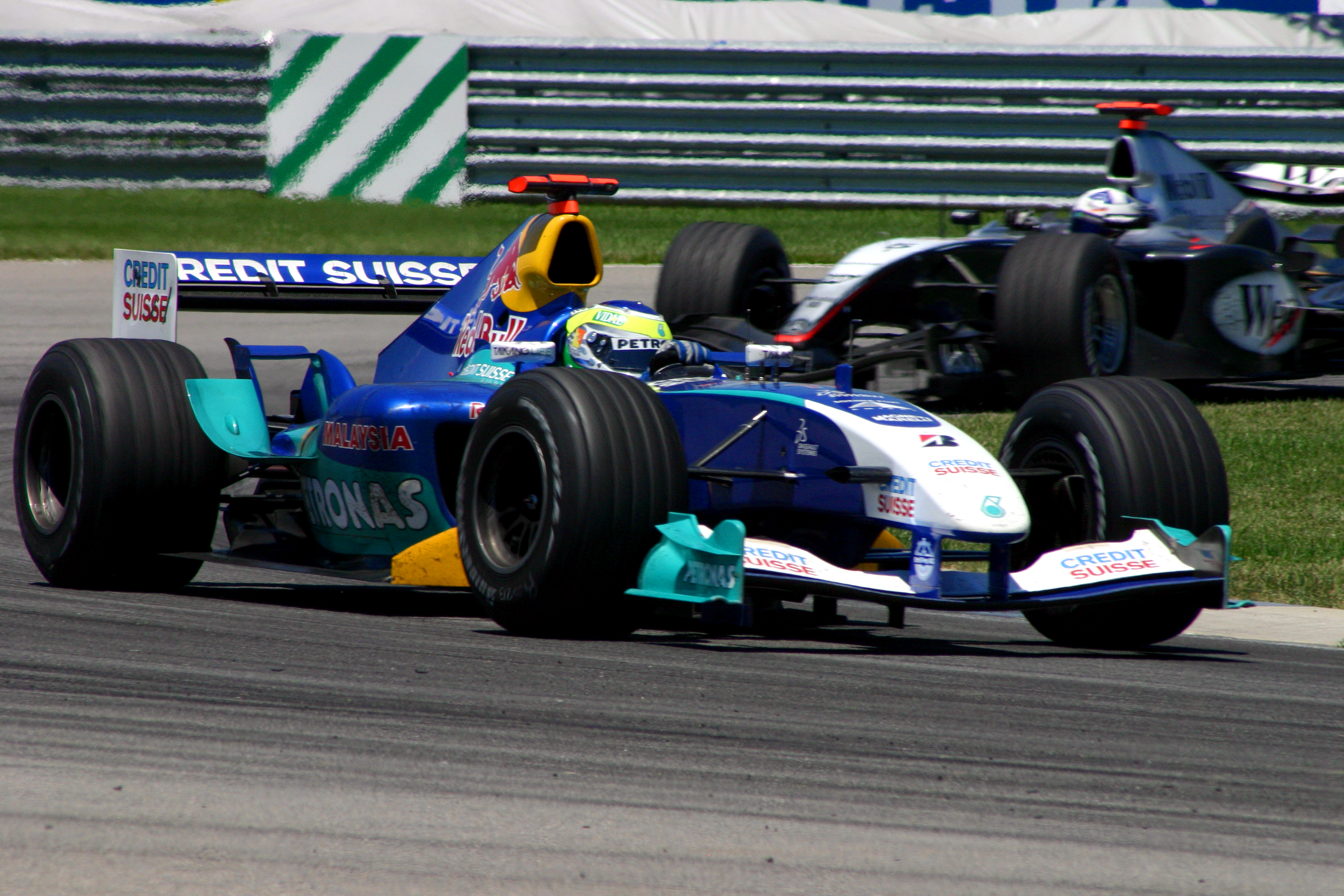
Giancarlo Fisichella driving for the Sauber Petronas Formula One team at the US Grand Prix at Indianapolis, 2004

In November 1991 Mercedes decided against direct involvement and so Sauber entered F1 by itself in 1993, with drivers JJ Lehto and Karl Wendlinger powered by engines built by Ilmor but rebadged as Saubers. Sauber did convince Mercedes to enter F1 in 1994 but a year later the German company did a deal with McLaren, leaving Sauber to become the Ford F1 works team. This was followed by a deal with the Malaysian oil company Petronas in 1995 and the establishment of an engineering company called Sauber Petronas Engineering to design and build V10 engines. The company began buying old Ferrari engines and rebadging them as Sauber Petronas V10s but the F1 engine program itself was scrapped in 1998. In the later years of this period Sauber saw increased success with the team finishing fourth in the World Championship in 2001 and fifth in 2002 despite having a much smaller budget than many of its rivals. The team however never scored a race win.

==== The sale to BMW (2005–2009) ====
In June 2005, BMW acquired the major shareholding stake in the Sauber team from Credit Suisse, which owned more than 60% of the team from a deal Peter Sauber initiated in 1994 selling a majority stake of the team to its major sponsor. It was done with Peter Sauber's blessing, the team was known as BMW Sauber, and Peter took a background advisory role within it, retaining a 20% stake in the team.

==== Return to Peter Sauber (2009–2016) ====
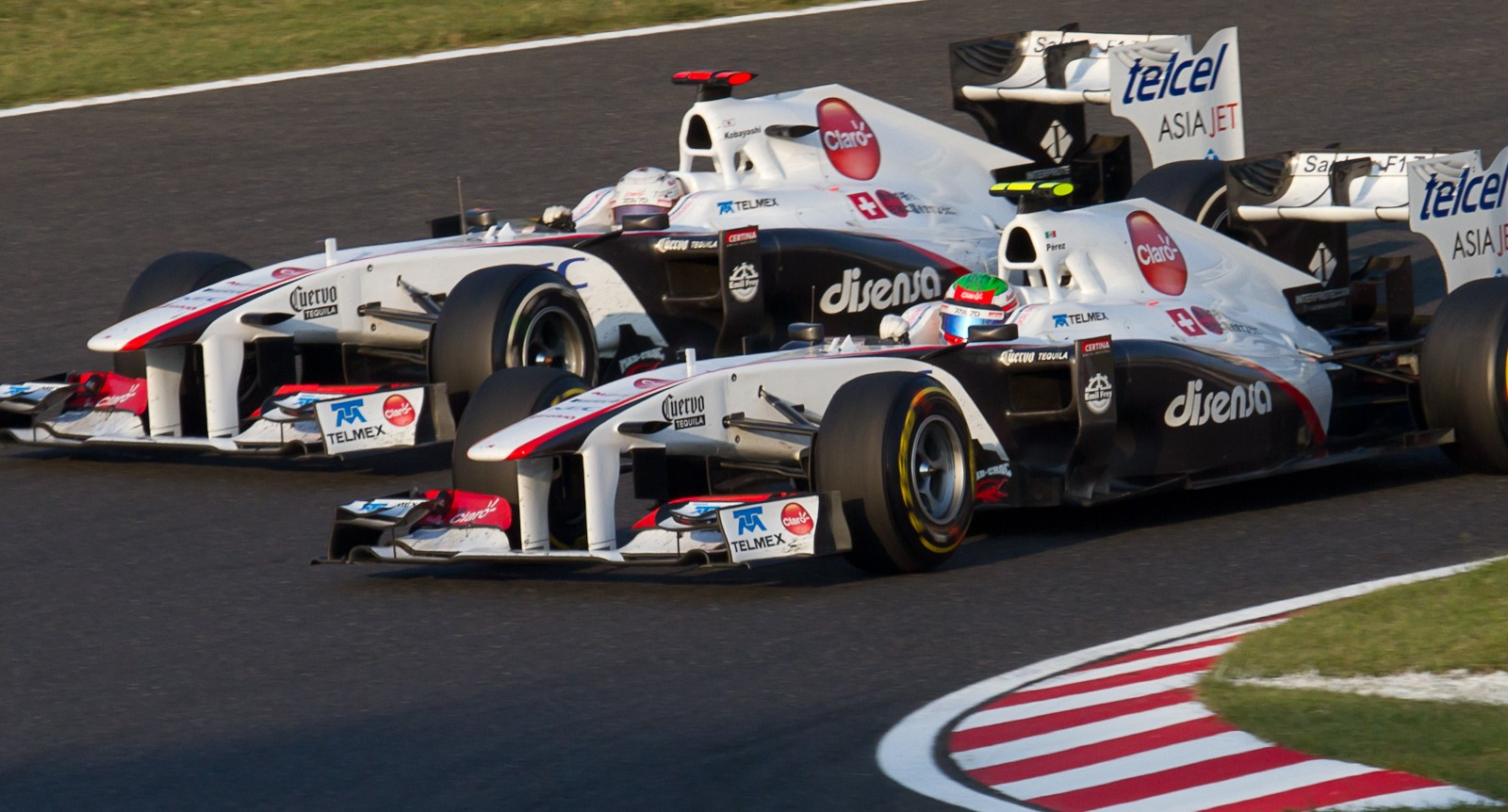
Formula One 2011 Rd.15 Japanese GP: Sergio Pérez (Sauber) overtaking Kamui Kobayashi (Sauber)

In July 2009, BMW announced its withdrawal from Formula One at the end of the season. Peter Sauber worked with BMW to develop a rescue package that would allow the team to continue in the sport without the manufacturer's backing. Qadbak Investments Ltd were thought to have purchased the team, but on 27 November 2009 it was announced that the Qadbak deal had fallen through and BMW had instead reached an agreement to sell the entire F1 operation back to Peter Sauber.

This sale would only go ahead if the team was granted a place on the 2010 grid by the FIA. On 3 December 2009, the FIA announced it had confirmed Sauber's entry for the 2010 season had been granted, and Sauber regained ownership of the team. In May 2012, Sauber transferred a one-third stake in the Sauber Group to Monisha Kaltenborn, the team's CEO and his designated successor. In October, it was announced that Sauber was stepping back from the day-to-day running of his team, promoting Kaltenborn to the team principal's position, while remaining President of the Sauber Group's board of directors.

The 2016 Formula One season saw Sauber back with substantial financial troubles. In July 2016, Longbow Finance, a Swiss investment company, bought Sauber Motorsport, gaining complete ownership. With the sale, Peter Sauber announced his retirement from motorsport with Pascal Picci taking his position at the company.

== Personal life ==
Sauber is married to Christiane (for whom all of his cars are designated "C"). They have two sons: Philipp (born 1971) and Alex (born 1973). Alex began working for the Sauber team in 2010.
