= Suspension link =

Automotive part

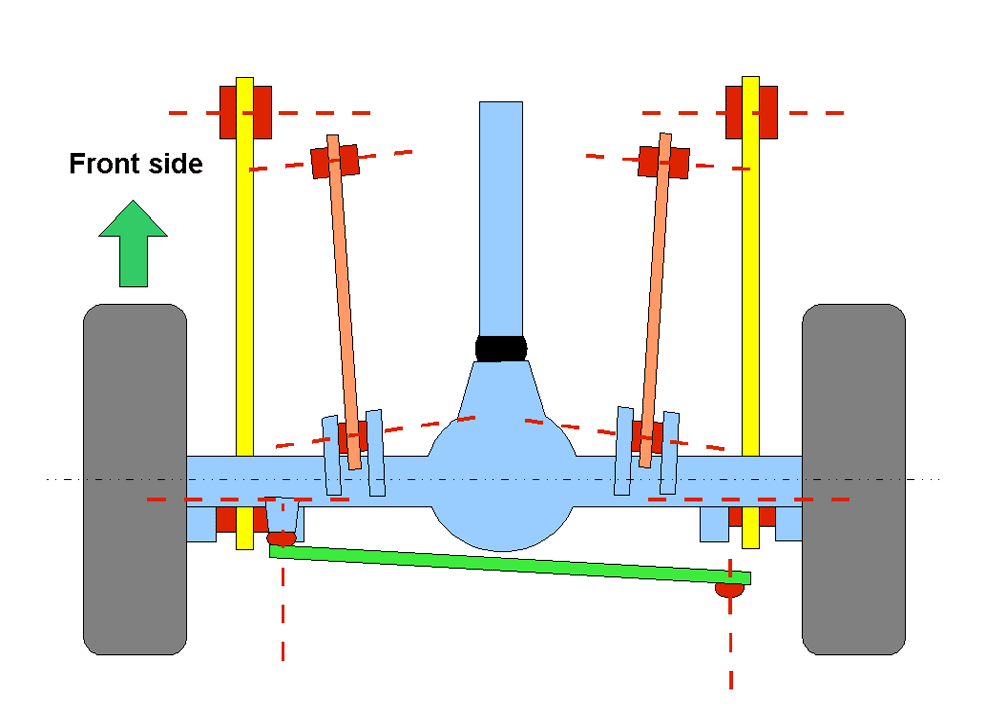
5-link live axle suspension

In automotive suspensions, a suspension link, control link or link is a rigid member that guides and constrains wheel movement without bearing the weight of the vehicle. The link connects the body or frame of the vehicle to the knuckle, upright, axle or another link. The link pivots on either a bushing or a ball joint at each attachment point. A link differs from a control arm because it can only control one of the degrees of freedom by itself.

In the attached photo of a 5-link live axle suspension, the different types of links can be seen. These links work in tandem with the coil springs, dampers, and sway bar to control all six degrees of freedom of the axle. The upper links (orange) and the lower links (yellow) work in tandem to control the pitch, yaw and the fore and aft movement (surge). The panhard rod (green) controls the left and right movement (sway). While the springs and dampers (not shown) control the up and down movement (heave) and the roll is controlled by the sway bar (also not shown).

It takes a minimum of two links per wheel in a MacPherson strut-style suspension and a minimum of three links per wheel in a multi-link suspension.

== See also ==
- Control arm
- Radius rod
- Panhard rod
- Multi-link suspension
