= 1985 24 Hours of Le Mans =

53rd 24 Hours of Le Mans endurance race

Previous: 1984	Next: 1986
Index: Races | Winners

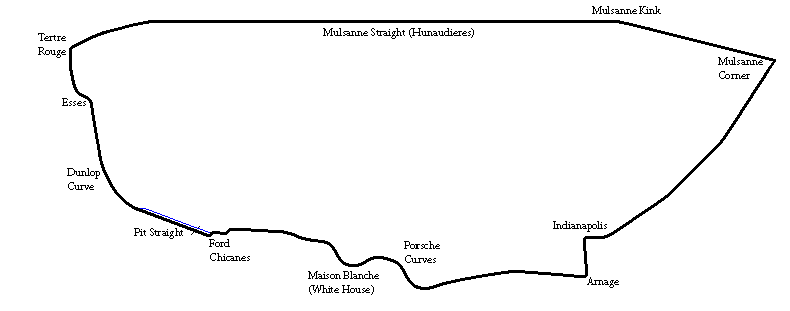
Le Mans in 1985

The 1985 24 Hours of Le Mans was the 53rd Grand Prix of Endurance, as well as the fourth round of the 1985 World Endurance Championship. It took place at the Circuit de la Sarthe, France, on 15 and 16 June 1985. The works Porsche team returned, with a Group C version of the 962. As favourites, they could expect from their customer teams and the works Lancias. In qualifying, Hans-Joachim Stuck set a new lap record in his works Porsche, with an average speed over 250 km/h for the first time. Mercedes returned for the first time in 30 years, as engine supplier to the Sauber team. The return was short-lived though, as the car got airborne in practice and crashed. With tighter fuel regulations this year from FISA, the teams would have to be more mindful of fuel economy and speed. However, from the start the Joest and Richard Lloyd Racing teams had the measure of the field. Working in tandem, Klaus Ludwig and Jonathon Palmer took turns leading and slipstreaming behind the other. Then at 9pm Jean-Claude Andruet had a major accident when his WM had a tyre blow out a high speed at the Mulsanne kink, sending him into the Armco barriers. Andruet was uninjured, but the race went behind the pace-cars for a half-hour as repairs were done. Just as the race resumed James Weaver pitted the RLR Porsche with an engine misfire. Traced to a faulty sensor, they returned to the race in 7th.

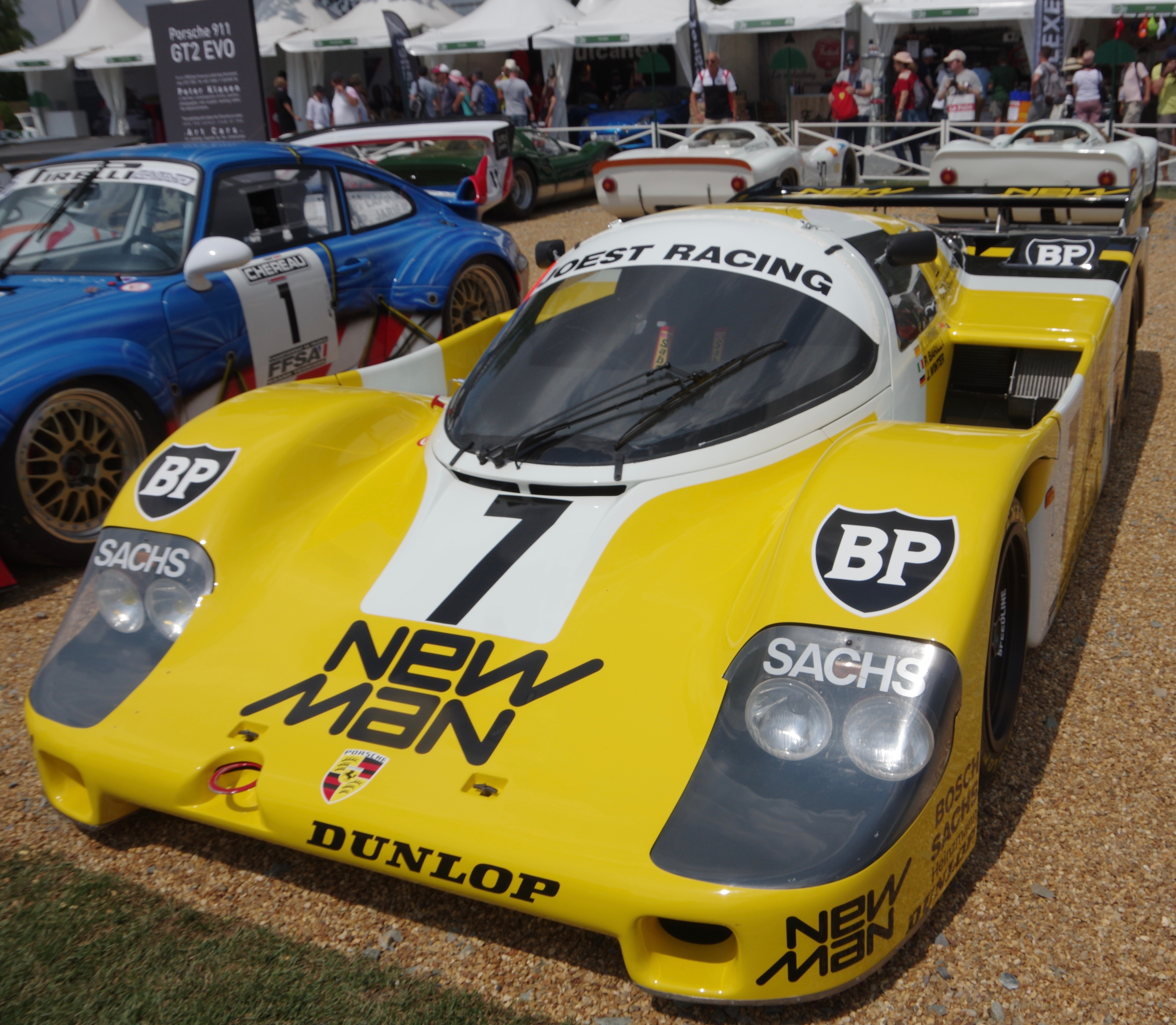
Porsche 956B, chassis #117 of Joest Racing, winner of consecutive Le Mans

Thereafter, the Joest Porsche was untroubled, and Ludwig and Barilla, along with a single night-time driving stint from "John Winter" (Louis Krages), drove a perfectly judged race combining speed with economy that none of the other teams could match. For only the second time, the same car-chassis won a consecutive Le Mans, following Ford in 1968–69. Ludwig took his third overall win. Palmer and Weaver came back through the field and were second in the RLR Porsche. Third was the works Porsche of Derek Bell and Hans-Joachim Stuck, seven laps behind the winners. Both Lancias finished this year, in 6th and 7th, and the first non-turbo was the EMKA-Aston Martin, coming home in 11th, 14 laps ahead of the Tullius/Ballot-Léna/Robinson Jaguar in 13th.

In his final Le Mans, Jacky Ickx finished an anticlimactic 10th as the lowest placed Porsche, after a race of constant delay. Despite the tighter fuel restrictions, the winning car covered 190 km (115 miles) further than they did winning the previous year. They recorded the second-fastest race speed ever at Le Mans, only exceeded by the 1971 race and also won the Index prize.

== Regulations ==
By the start of the season, FISA (Fédération Internationale du Sport Automobile) had dropped its abrupt regulation changes for the World Championship. This was sufficient to mollify the concerns of the works teams at Porsche and Lancia. However, they still wanted to manufacturers to improve fuel economy and reduced the total available for the 24 hours down by 15% to 2210 litres. The level for the C2 class remained at 1430 litres (as did the minimum weight of 700 kg).

Despite the arrival of technically specific fuels in Formula 1, the Automobile Club de l'Ouest (ACO) mandated that all cars had to use the standard 105-octane supplied centrally. Instead, the new controversy was the scheduling clash between the Formula 1 races and the Endurance Championship that raised the ire of several teams. They threatened to boycott two races in response.

This year, there were significant changes in the race organisation. A cooperative of local civic bodies was formed to organise and administer the race and its preparation, with financial investment from the national government and Sarthe département. Such was the success of the Group C formula, spectator numbers were now starting to balloon upwards, particularly from foreign fans. In the World Championship, the Makes title was changed to become instead a championship for Teams, tacitly acknowledging Porsches dominance by sheer weight of numbers.

== Entries ==
Group C1 fields in Europe continued to flourish, albeit heavily filled with Porsches. It was attracting more interest from major manufacturers. This year Porsche and Lancia had cars, while Mercedes and Toyota arrived with support for their engines, joining Peugeot, Ferrari and Aston Martin. It also encouraged the arrival of one-off specials. In the C2 class, it was Mazda taking on the small constructors Alba, Tiga and Ecosse. Although the IMSA classes were eligible, the only ones accepted were the two Jaguar GTPs. The ACO was infuriated that the FIA had scheduled the Canadian F1 Grand Prix against the race, which robbed several teams of their top-line drivers. Most teams had young drivers on their books, coming through the junior ranks of single-seater racing, like Formula 2, Formula 3 and Formula 3000.

Class	Quantity	Turbo/Rotary engines
Group C1	41 / 27	27 / 21
IMSA-GTP	2 / 2	0
Group C2	25 / 16	7 / 5
Group B	4 / 4	0
IMSA-GTO	3 / 0	0
Total Entries	75 / 49	34 / 26

- Note: The first number is the number accepted, the second the number who started.

=== Group C1 and GTP ===
Porsche maintained its dominance of the C1 class with 13 out of the 29 entries. The Rothmans Porsche works team returned to Le Mans and this year was equipped with the new Group C version of the Porsche 962 that had originally been developed for the IMSA series. Under Group C rules, it could be fitted with the twin KKK (Kühnle, Kopp & Kausch) turbos. For the first time, they were fitted with the langheck chassis to maximise speed. Three were brought for the race, along with a 956 as a test car. The full might of the veteran team of drivers was present: Jochen Mass and six-time winner Jacky Ickx (the pair colloquially called "MIX") had won two of the three championship rounds to date, at Mugello and Silverstone. Three-time winner Derek Bell was partnered with Hans-Joachim Stuck ("BEST") and John Watson joined 1983 winners Vern Schuppan and Al Holbert ("WASH").

Last year's winner, the Joest Racing team returned with their winning 956B from the previous year. Klaus Ludwig was back as lead-driver, with Paolo Barilla and pay-driver Louis Krages (racing under the pseudonym "John Winter"). Given the tighter fuel-ration in this year's race, the team went to extraordinary lengths to minimise fuel consumption. The car was fitted with a specially designed low-profile bodyshell. The minimal wing surface risked instability from the lack of downforce. The car was also fitted with an engine built at their own workshop. The drivers had the ability to manually adjust the turbo boost themselves, in the car. The team also had their older 956, to be driven again by Colombian Mauricio de Narvaez, this time with new team driver Paul Belmondo and American Kenper Miller. Meanwhile, team manager Domingos Piedade did his calculations for the optimal race tactics, fitting the gearboxes with the highest gear-ratio settings.

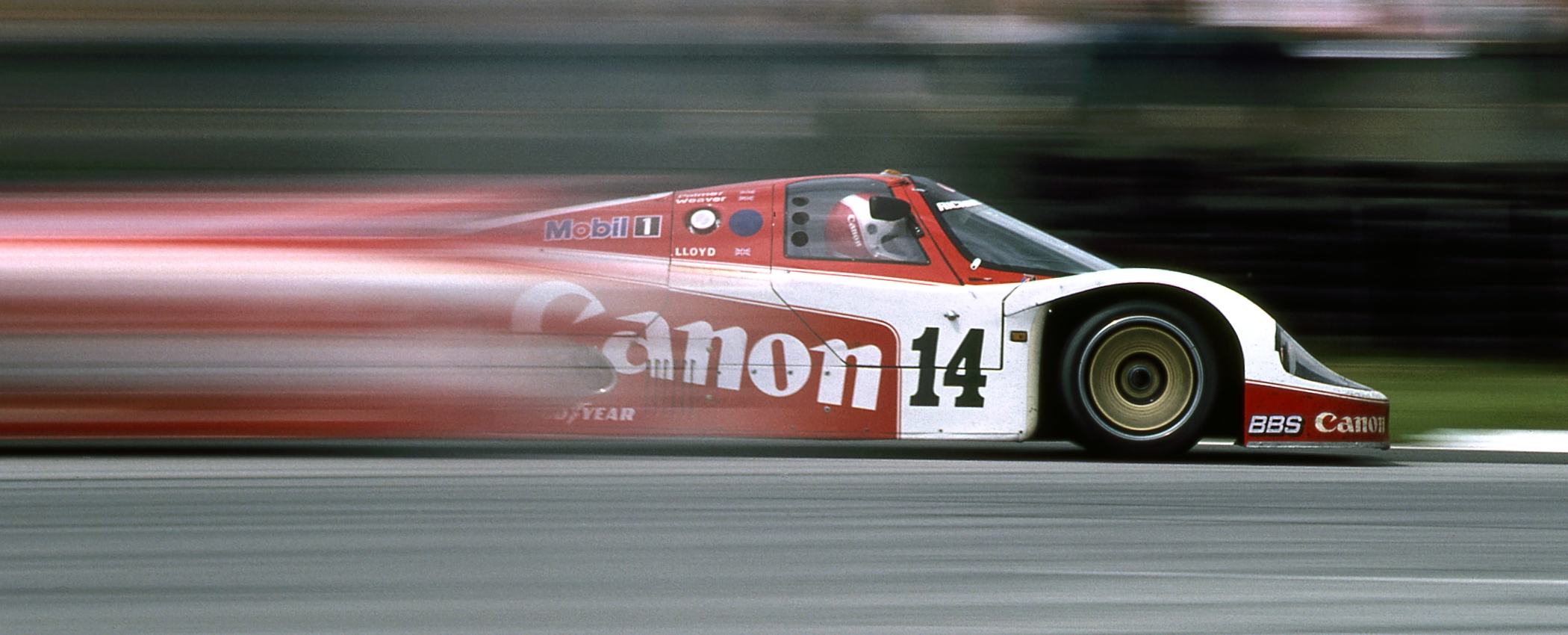
Porsche 956B of Richard Lloyd Racing

The first three customer teams to buy the 962C were Kremer Racing, Brun Motorsport and John Fitzpatrick Racing and all three supported those with a second 956 car in their squads. While the works 962s had 17" front wheels and 19" rears, the customer cars had 16" wheels all round. The Kremer team had won the second round, at Monza, in their 962 modified with a vertical fin on the tail to improve stability. However, the winning drivers, Marc Surer and Manfred Winkelhock, had been called over by their F1 teams for the Canadian GP. In their stead, Franz Konrad, Jean-Pierre Jarier and Mike Thackwell ran the 962. South African team regulars George Fouché and Sarel van der Merwe ran the 956 with Mario Hytten. Walter Brun had also lost his two top drivers to Canada – Stefan Bellof (the defending Drivers Champion had been enticed away from the works team) and Thierry Boutsen – so Brun took the lead himself with his 962, bringing in Didier Theys and Joël Gouhier. Oscar Larrauri and Massimo Sigala had the Brun 956, joined by Gabriele Tarquini for this race. Fitzpatrick instead mixed up his regular driver line-ups. In the 962 were Kenny Acheson, Dudley Wood and Jean-Louis Schlesser while Jo Gartner/David Hobbs/Guy Edwards drove the second car.

Like Joest, Richard Lloyd's GTi Engineering had done considerable work modifying their 956B, rebuilding it on a strong honeycomb-monocoque rather than the standard single-sheet hub. They also tweaked their langheck bodyshell. The regular team of Jonathon Palmer and Jan Lammers had started the season together, but just before Le Mans, Lammers abruptly left to take up a career in American IndyCar racing. His replacement, with barely a week's notice, was James Weaver, joining Palmer and Lloyd. The proposed second entry was withdrawn. The Hans Obermeier team returned with their 956. This year owner-driver Jürgen Lässig was accompanied by Spaniard Jesús Pareja and Belgian Hervé Regout.

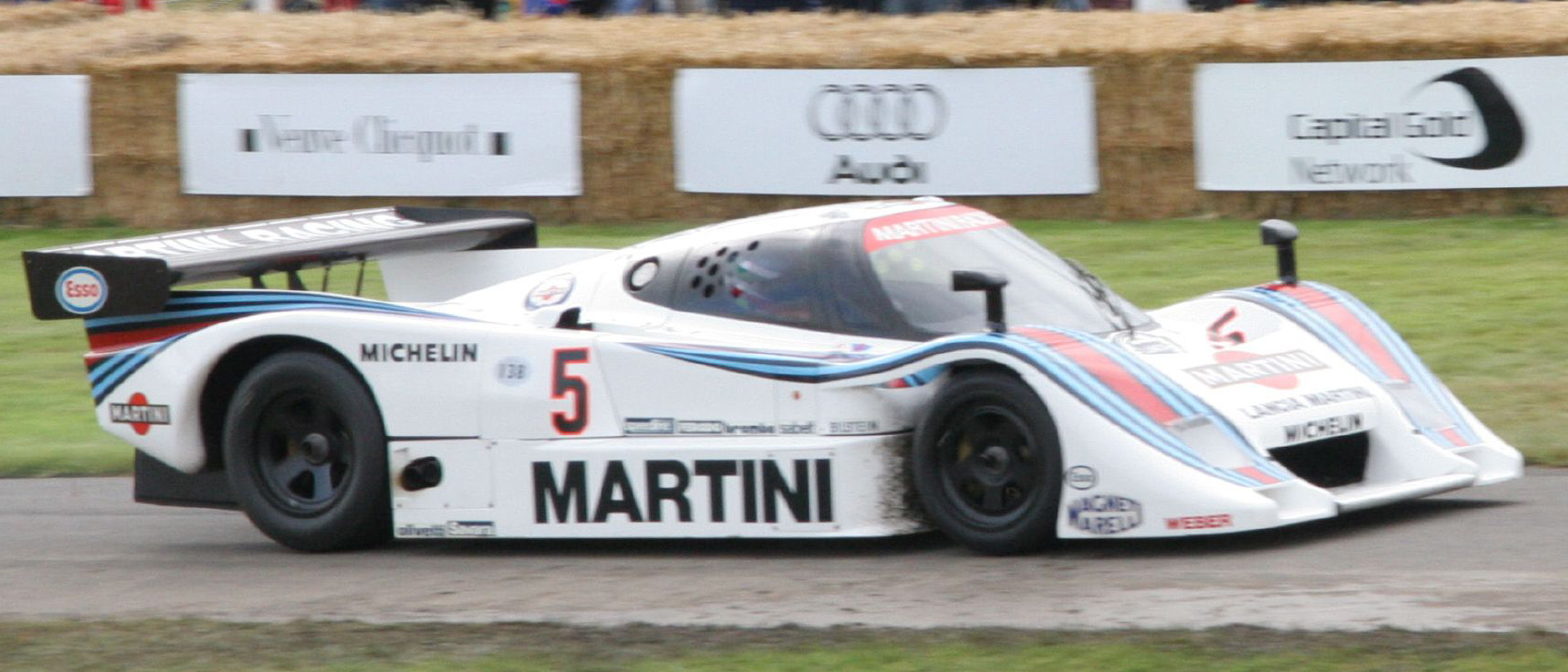
Lancia LC2/85

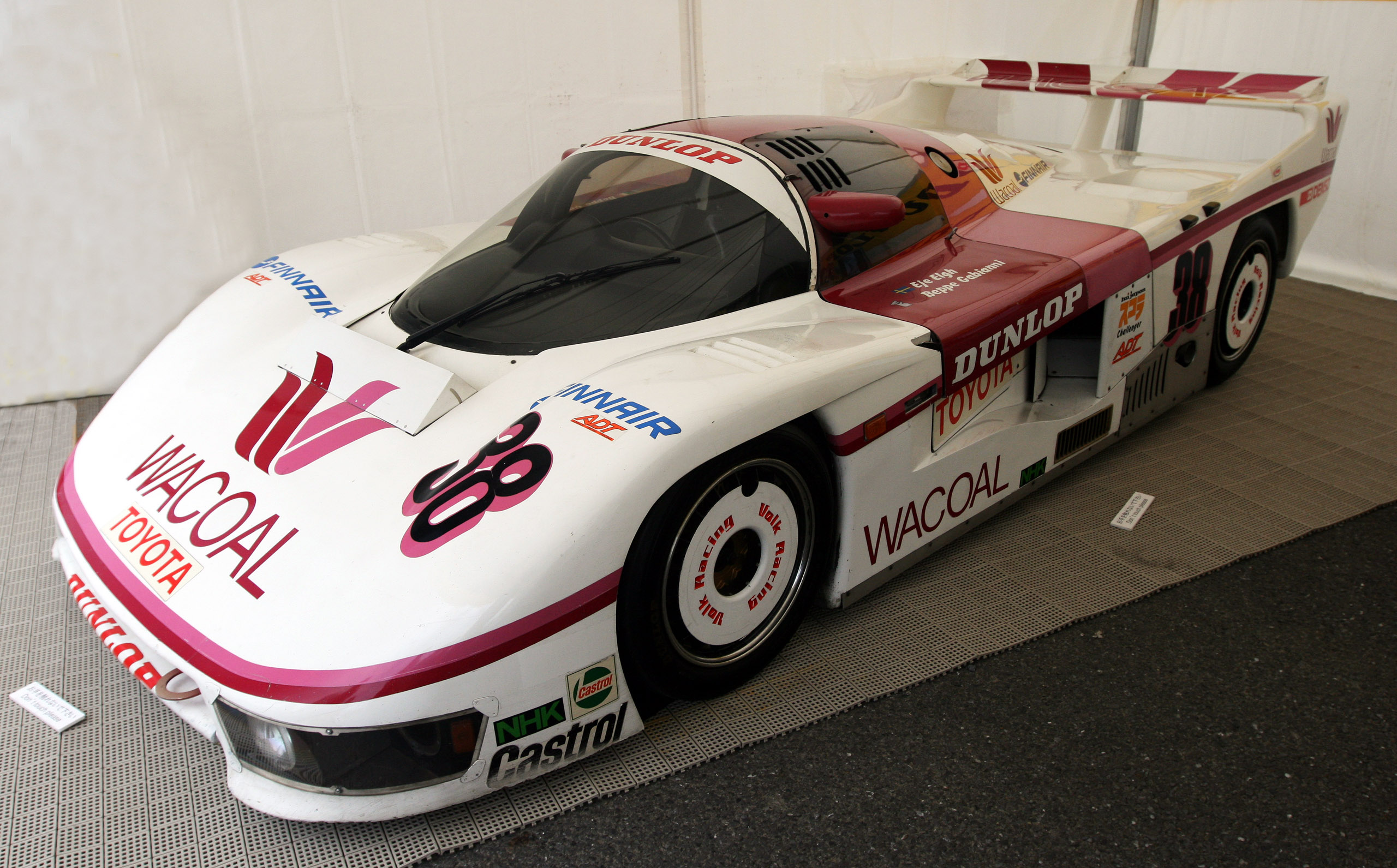
Dome-Toyota 85C

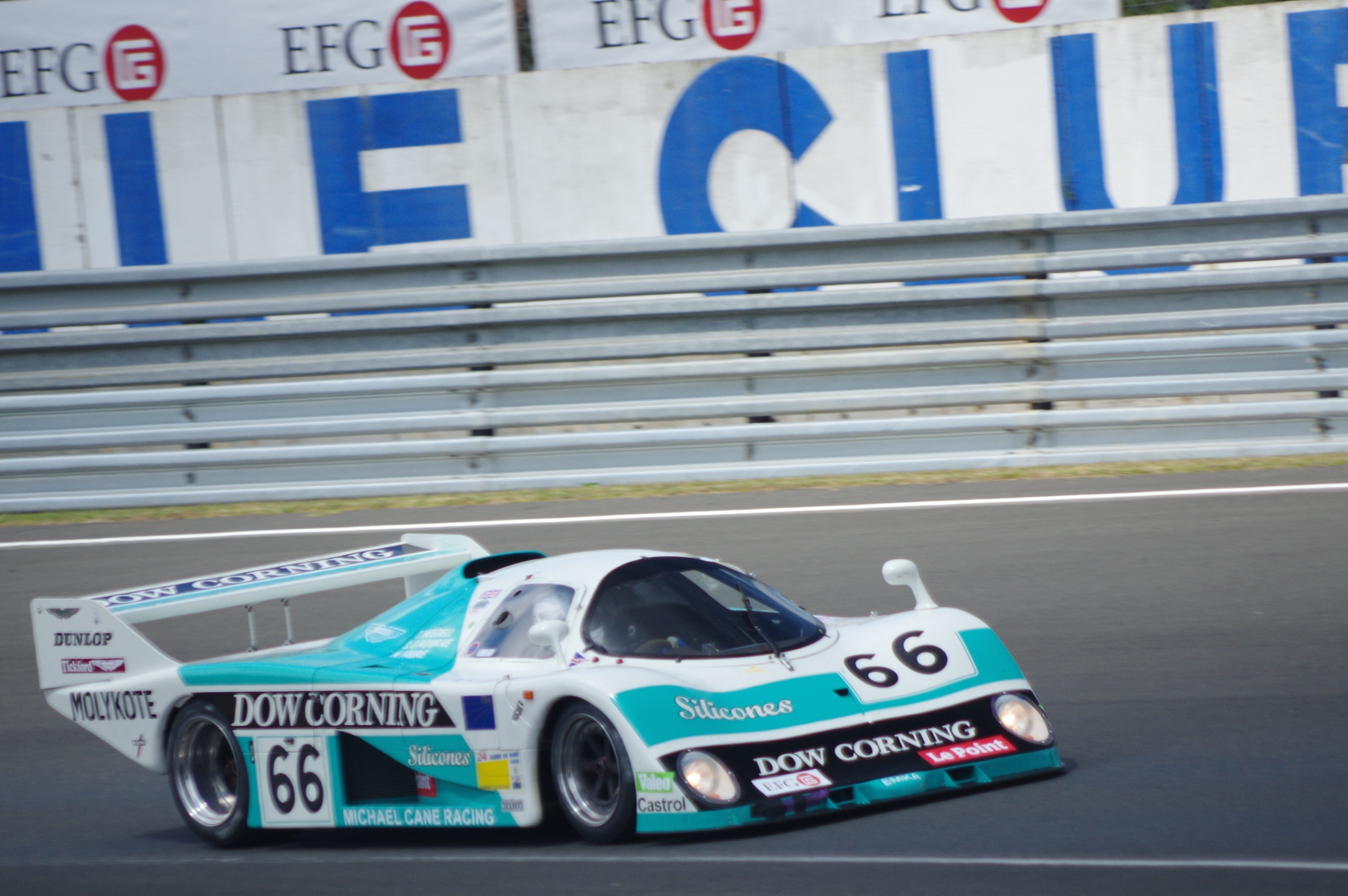
EMKA C83B

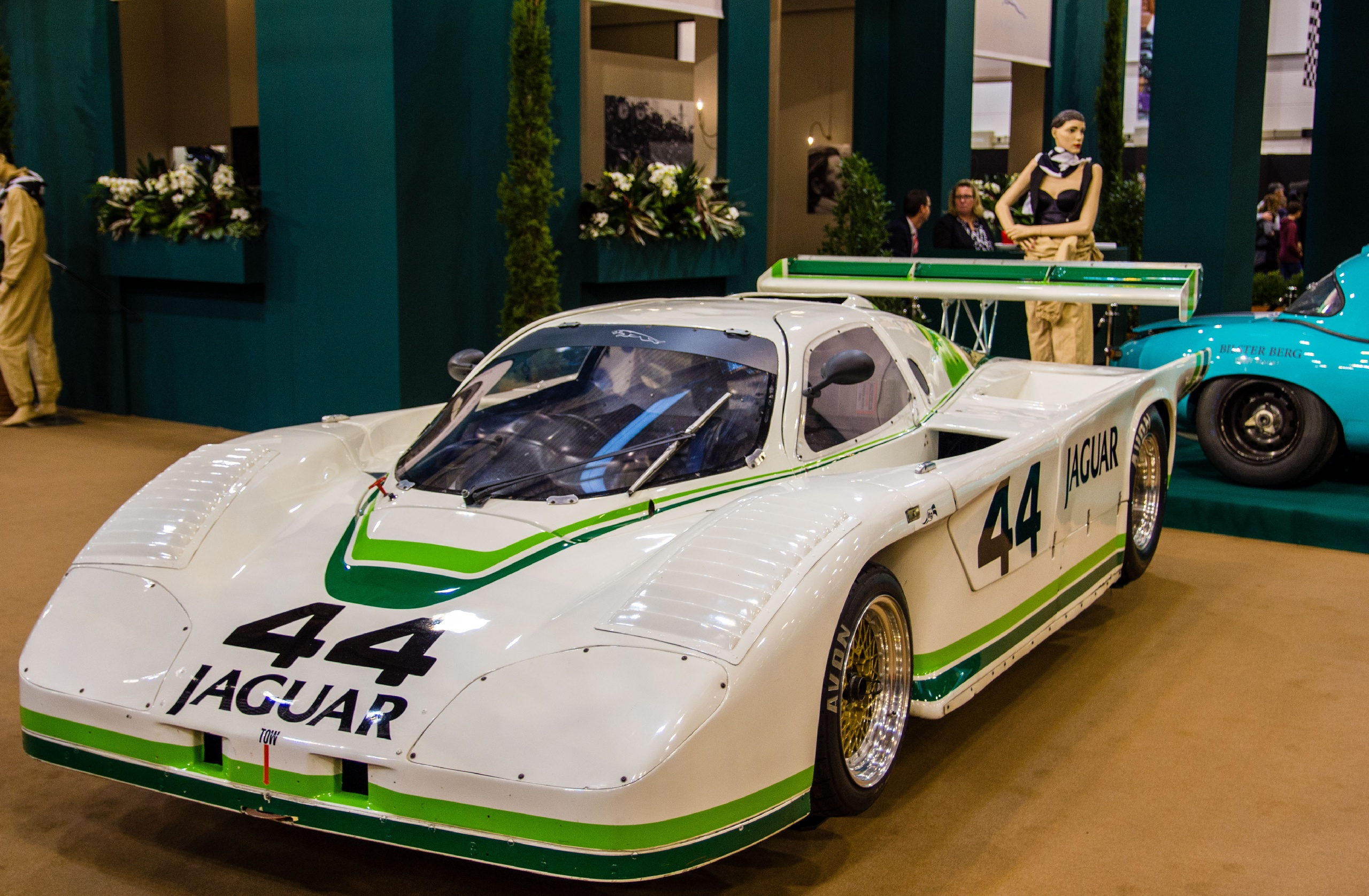
Jaguar XJR-5 of Group 44 Racing

The Lancia Corse team arrived with three cars. The LC2/85 had been redesigned by engineer Claudio Lombardi. It was widened by 200mm. The suspension was upgraded (to fit new Michelin tyres), as was the geartrain and an improved Weber-Marelli engine-management system. Once again, Bob Wollek teamed up with Alessandro Nannini, and reserve driver Italo-Australian Lucio Cesario. The second race-car had Mauro Baldi with guest driver Henri Pescarolo. The third car was kept aside as a test-car.

Once again, WM put all its focus on this race. The P83B returned with revised aerodynamics to reduce air resistance for better fuel economy. Another change was to reduce the engines from 2850cc down to 2750cc. These were set to about 740 bhp for qualifying (1.5-bar boost) and 620 bhp in race-trim. After last year's issues, two of the three cars were now fitted with Hewland gearboxes, the third keeping its ZF box. Fellow French constructor Jean Rondeau joined team regulars Pignard and Raulet, while team leader Roger Dorchy was on notice as a Reserve entry, with veteran touring-car drivers Claude Haldi and Jean-Claude Andruet as co-drivers. In the close season Yves Courage had picked up a Porsche dealership. The Cougar C02 was modified to fit the twin-turbo Porsche engine as used in the 962s. Like the Porsches, It had to be mounted at an angle to accommodate the underfloor ground-effect venturis. Former Renault designer Marcel Hubert tweaked the aerodynamics, and all of which made this the fastest car seen at Le Mans since 1978: reaching 370 km/h (230 mph) on the Hunaudières Straight. With such speed, Alain de Cadenet came back to race with Courage. Another team using the Porsche engine was the Kreepy Krauly March. South African father and son, Ferdinand and Daniel Chauvier, were introducing their pool-cleaning robot into the USA. With the money made they set up an IMSA racing team named after the machine, and based in Atlanta, Georgia. With the ex-Al Holbert March 83G, the new team had immediate success winning the 1984 24 Hours of Daytona. They then bought the ex-Pegasus Racing March 84G and swapped the Buick V6 engine for the Porsche flat-6. To comply for Group C, an 80x100cm flat floorplate was fitted under the chassis while still leaving the ends open for airflow and downforce. The scrutineers, however, took a dim view of this and the team lost the first 90 minutes of practice closing off each end for the undertray to comply with the regulations. Drivers Christian Danner and Almo Coppelli were going to be joined by Ian Scheckter. However, when he fell ill, his spot was taken by fellow South African Graham Duxbury who had been in the Daytona winning crew.

Peter Sauber had run his BMW-engined C7 at the 1983 Le Mans, the only non-Porsche to finish in the top-10. Although he sold three cars to IMSA teams, he did not have the funds to run a Group C program in 1984. However, in October, his factory was visited by engineers from Mercedes-Benz. They were confident their 5-litre V8 would work well in the Group C fuel-formula. Mercedes had withdrawn from racing 30 years earlier after the 1955 Le Mans disaster. The company was very reticent about announcing a return, so insisted that the engines would be supplied through Sauber's Swiss engine-tuner Heini Mader. The new Sauber C8 was designed by Leo Ress (who had worked with Mercedes and BMW previously). The all-aluminium twin-valve V8 was fitted with two KKK turbos and utilised the Bosch Motronic engine-management system. It put out 650 bhp on 0.7-bar of boost, that could reach 355 km/h (220 mph). Sauber estimated that the bigger engine would operate at lower revs and hence use about 15% less fuel. The drivers were Dieter Quester, Max Welti and John Nielsen

Toyota Racing Development (TRD) had built Group C cars for several seasons and racing them at the Fuji rounds of the World Championship. The Dome-Toyota 84C had got the company's first victory earlier in the year, in the All-Japan series, driven by Geoff Lees and Eje Elgh. They then took the step up, coming to Le Mans with works support of the Dome team as the engine-supplier. The new car, the 85C, had the racing version of the 4-cylinder turbo engine, also used in the Toyota Celica Group B rally-car. A 2.1-litre twin-cam unit with KKK turbo, it could put out 560 bhp. In race trim it would run at 1.2-bar, while for qualifying it would be wound up to 1.6-bar. Two longtail models were dispatched entered by the collaborating teams: Dome, and TOM'S Racing (at the time semi-works performance team). Lees and Elgh raced the former with Toshio Suzuki, and the all-Japanese team of Satoru Nakajima/Kaoru Hishino/Masanori Sekiya ran the latter.

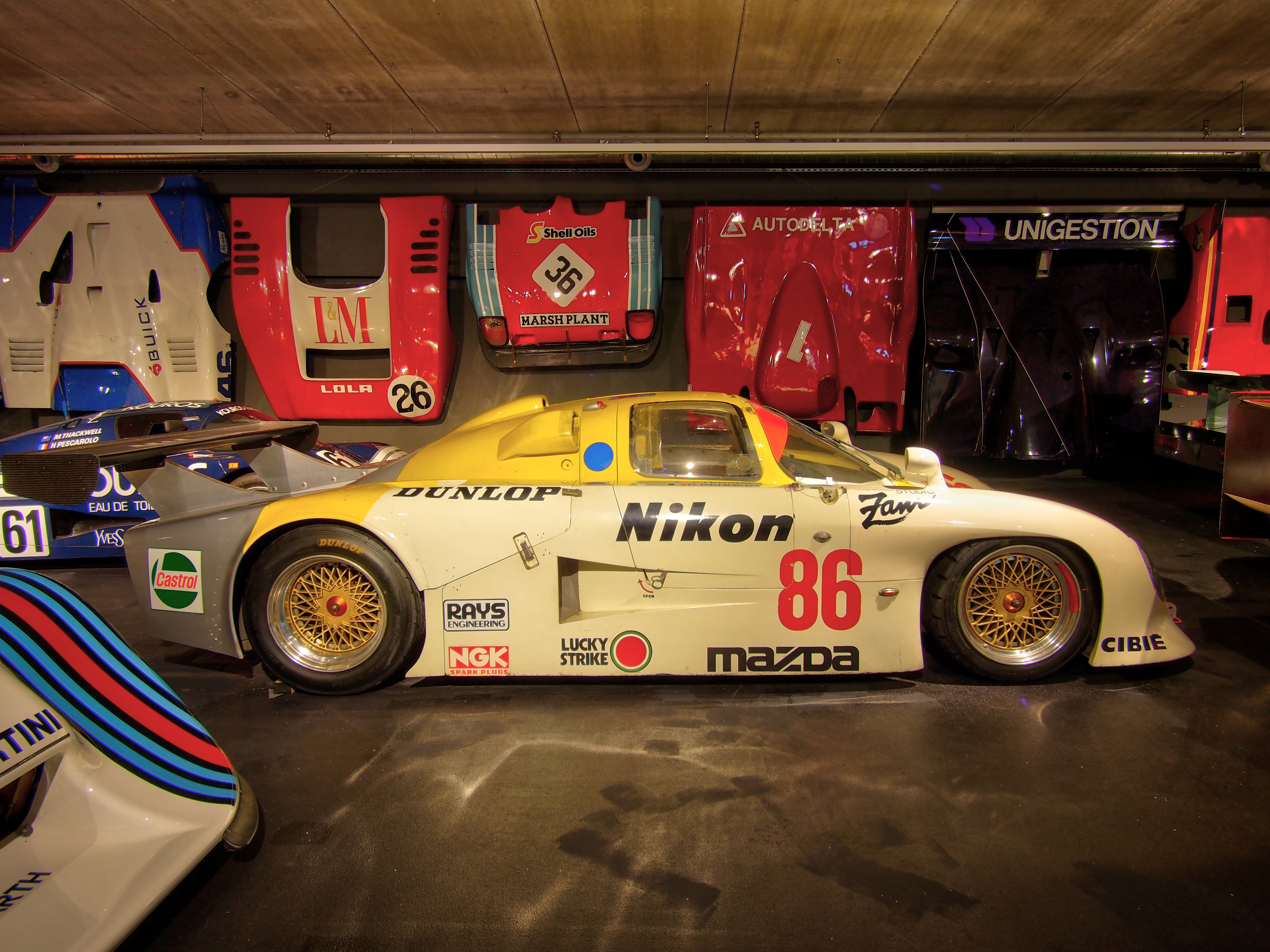
Mazda 737C

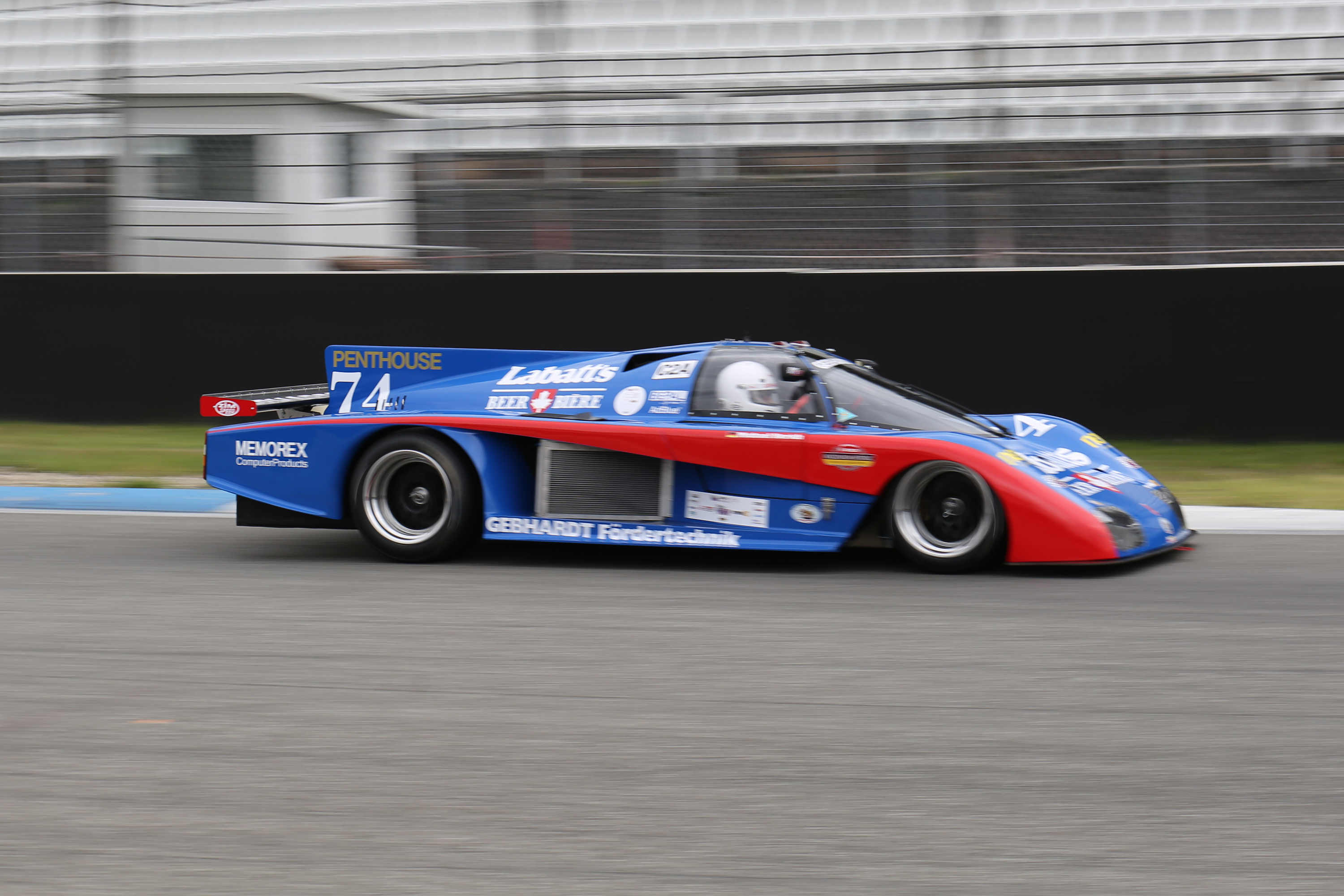
Gebhardt JC853

Steve O'Rourke had taken a year away with his EMKA Group C car. He returned this year after considerable re-design and development work had been done. It was the only Aston Martin engine this year, and prepared by Tickford Engineering. With Lucas-Micos fuel-injection the 5.3-litre normally aspirated V8 could now put out 585 bhp and get the car up to almost 350 km/h (215 mph). O'Rourke had the experienced Tiff Needell and Nick Faure as co-drivers. There was no works Rondeau team at Le Mans this year. Jean-Philippe Grand's Graff Racing had bought the M482 car run under the works banner last year. Regular privateer, Christian Bussi had put in three entries, adding to his regular DFV-M382 with a 2-year old ex-works DFL-M382. To be raced by Bussi himself, it was on the reserve list while the third entry was cancelled. Pierre Yver brought his M382 (DFV) back for its third run, with his Primagaz sponsorship.

The only entries in the IMSA-GTP class were the pair of Jaguars of the American Group 44 Racing team. Bob Tullius brought the same two XJR-5 chassis he had raced at Le Mans a year ago, albeit with a number of improvements. The undertray was re-profiled, and given stiffer rear suspension. But topping the scales at around 1000 kg, (including carrying an extra 50 kg for IMSA regulations), they were easily the heaviest cars in the field. However, engine output had been increased to 670 bhp that kept its top speed at 340 km/h (210 mph). His regular IMSA drivers were present: Tullius raced with debutante Chip Robinson and Claude Ballot-Léna (in his record 20th Le Mans) while the second car had Brian Redman/Hurley Haywood/Jim Adams. Jaguar had put in a Le Mans entry in C1 for the new XJR-6 model; however, the cars were not deemed ready for racing and withdrawn. Much to the chagrin of Bob Tullius, for all the development work he had been doing and profile raised for Jaguar, the company was working in conjunction with Tom Walkinshaw Racing instead of his own operation.

=== Group C2 ===
After winning the C2 championship in 1984, the Scuderia Jolly Club (now rebranded as Carma FF) had struggled in the new season. Alba had built several cars for the IMSA Lights category, and the new model for the season was the AR6. It was fitted with a new turbocharged 1915cc Giannini engine with an engine-management system of Carlo Facetti's own design. The bodyshell was wider and longer than the AR2, tested in a wind tunnel, and the suspension, exhaust and cooling all updated. Three Albas were entered: an AR6 and AR2 by the Carma FF team, while they also supported a Cosworth-powered AR3 for Grifo Autoracing team.

Mazdaspeed brought two of the new 737C cars to Le Mans. Upgrades were done with the chassis and engine. The wheelbase was lengthened and strengthened for better stability. Essentially the same driver line-up was present, with Irishman David Kennedy teaming up with the Belgian Martin brothers, Jean-Michel and Philippe, again. The Japanese works car had Yojiro Terada and Takashi Yorino, joined by the experienced Yoshimi Katayama who had raced the class-winning Lola-Mazda in the 1984 race.

Gordon Spice and Ray Bellm had created their new company, Spice Engineering, in the close-season after a very strong finish to the previous year, winning all five of the races they entered after Le Mans. They continued that form this season, coming to this race as championship leaders after winning two of the first three events. The new Spice-Tiga GC85 had been delayed by RAM Racing but finally delivered. Spice and Bellm were joined by Mark Galvin. Meanwhile, fellow Tiga supporter, Australian Neil Crang had sold his two GC84 cars to Tim Lee-Davey. Both were entered in Le Mans under the Spice Engineering banner. One arrived at the track, to be raced by Lee-Davey, Crang and British veteran Tony Lanfranchi. The Spice car ran the 3.3-litre Cosworth DFL, while the other had the 3-litre DFV. British privateer Roy Baker returned with two cars this year. His Tigas (the original GC284 and a newer GC285) were again fitted with the 1.8-litre turbocharged Cosworth BDT rally engine. The Ecurie Ecosse team had a foreshortened season last year when their car was wrecked at the British Grand Prix meeting. A new C285 was built for this season and the two races it had entered to date yielded a second and a class-win. The drivers for the season were David Leslie, Ray Mallock and Mike Wilds.

The Gebhardt brothers, Gerhardt and Fritz, were keen amateur drivers in Germany. In 1983, with Bill Harris, they set up Gebhardt Motorsport, based at Silverstone, England. After a promising 1984 season using both the BMW M88 and Cosworth DFV engines, the team had three Le Mans entries for their new JC853 (although in the end only one arrived). It would be driven by team regulars Frank Jelinski and Nick Adams. The BMW-powered car of the '84 season was bought by ADA Engineering that embarked on a part-season. Owner-driver, Ian Harrower, engaged John Sheldon as a co-driver, in his first drive since his major accident at Le Mans the year before.

Once again, the older Rondeau M379C was entered in C2. Lucien Roussiaud had purchased the car from Graff Racing, getting the engine tuned, as before, by Heini Mader. The Sehcar C6 had debuted in 1982 with Sauber, before being bought by Walter Brun. Now French privateer Roland Bassaler, bought the two cars and, fitting both with the BMW 3.5-litre engine, and entered them in the C2 class. Only capable of 270 km/h (170 mph), there were significantly slower than others in their class. Another amateur racer was Parisian PR executive Louis Descartes. He commissioned Jean-Paul Sauvée to design a C2 car, using the reliable BMW 3.5-litre engine. After a year of work, and over 3000 km of testing, the ALD 01 entered Le Mans sponsored by over 400 local businesses through the Chamber of Commerce and Industry.

=== Group B, GTX and GTO ===
With no entries arriving for IMSA GTO, the GTs were represented by a meagre list of four cars. More surprising was that there was but a single Porsche 911 entry – once the mainstay of GT racing at Le Mans. The BMW M1 filled the other three spots. Helmut Gall returned with his car, this time driven by Martin Birrane, Edgar Dören and Jean-Paul Libert. The veteran Claude Haldi did not take his entry, and instead it was taken up by Harald Grohs' Vogelsang team. Angelo Pallavicini had won the class in 1983, and returned with his M1 after a year away. Raymond Touroul had won last year's GTO class, and this year put his non-turbo 3-litre Porsche 911 SC in the Group B class.

== Practice and Qualifying ==
For qualifying, the works Porsches were fitted with 3-litre turbo engines. Hans-Joachim Stuck took pole position with a lap record of 3:14.8 set at twilight on the first day of practice. He beat Ickx's pole lap from 1983 by almost 2 seconds, with an average speed breaking 250 km/h (155 mph) for the first time at Le Mans. It was a record that would stand for 32 years, until Kamui Kobayashi broke it during practice for the 2017 race. Ickx himself also beat his old lap record to share the front row of the grid. Lancia tried to match the Porsches, and Nannini did exceed the 1983 pole time, but ended up third on the grid (3:16.0) over a second behind Stuck. Both teams ran Test-cars to optimise set-up. Cesare Fiorio made the baffling mistake of sending Wollek out for his best qualifying opportunity in the Lancia T-car. However, having put in his time it was then nullified. Fourth, in the Joest Porsche was Ludwig over five seconds behind the leader (3:20.0), ahead of the other works Porsche and Lancia. The privateer Porsche 956s filled out the top-10 with the Kremer car 7th (3:24.1) ahead of the other Joest car and the RLR and Brun entries. A number of teams were dissatisfied with the low-downforce kits on their cars, and reverted to the standard package finding times improved with greater cornering stability. The EMKA was the quickest of the non-turbo cars, in 13th (3:33.1), fully 9 seconds faster than it had been in 1983. The two Jaguars qualified 16th and 17th – the faster was again Tullius' (3:35.3), with an identical lap-time to the previous year. Young American Chip Robinson had a rude introduction to Le Mans when a tyre blew while at speed. Both car's engines burnt out pistons, likely owing to the change of fuel used. After the delay getting past scrutineering, the March had a problematic practice with a number of minor issues, and only qualified 24th (3:44.8). The best of the Domes was just ahead in 22nd (3:43.8) while Roger Dorchy was called up from the Reserves and had the best time for WM, in 19th (3:38.4).

There were two major incidents during practice: The Sauber had shown promise on the first day, putting in the second fastest speed down the straight and qualifying 14th, 12 seconds faster than the Sauber C7 did two years earlier. The next day, the team tweaked the aerodynamics to improve downforce. John Neilsen was just doing harm-up laps, when he got airborne as his new Sauber crested the rise after the Mulsanne kink at over 300 km/h. Doing two slow somersaults it landed back on its wheels before careering along the barriers to the Mulsanne corner. It was thought the undertray had detached from the chassis. In the other, also on the Hunaudières straight, the RLR-Porsche of Dudley Wood was overtaking the Carma Alba of Jean-Pierre Frey, both on their out-laps, when the two collided. The Porsche slammed into the barrier fences, flattening them for 80 metres, while the Alba vaulted the fence, ending up among the trees. From those incidents, only Wood was injured – suffering a fractured leg - and the other two were able to walk away shaken, but uninjured. Their respective cars were all written-off and would not take the start. The practice was stopped for two hours while the armco was repaired.

In the C2 class, all three Albas had qualified well – the Finotto car was the fastest in class, ending up 20th on the grid (3:42.6) and Frey would have been beside them. Third in class, and 23rd overall, was the Ecosse (3:44.2 – five seconds faster than last year) with the privateer Alba in 25th.

== Race ==
=== Start ===
Once again, race start was 3pm on the sunny Saturday afternoon. After the major accidents in practice there were only 49 starters, although one of the WMs had a flat battery and started a lap behind the field. From the second row of the grid, Wollek quickly surged to the lead past the two works Porsches. The Lancia was followed by Ludwig in the Joest Porsche, Palmer (Canon-RLR) and van der Merwe (Kremer) cars. By the second lap, Bell was back in 9th and Ickx out of the top-10. It was apparent the works Porsches were running to a prescribed lap-time and content to avoid the traditional starting-sprint to conserve their fuel. Wollek, having made his point, also settled back to a moderate race-pace, overtaken by Ludwig and dropping to 4th on the fourth lap. It was apparent the cars were doing lap-times 5–10 seconds slower than the previous year. The EMKA had started well and was running fourth on lap 13 when Needell was called into the pits for a strategic early stop. So, when the rest of the field pitted for fuel, Needell got the EMKA-Aston Martin four laps of free publicity for their sponsor, Dow Corning, running at the front of the field.

However, after the first fuel-stops it was the Joest and RLR teams that literally set the pace, with Larrauri's Brun Porsche in close pursuit. Ludwig and Palmer had worked out together that they could slipstream each other, not racing, and alternating the lead between each other to minimise their fuel consumption. After 25 laps, all three works Porsches were outside the top-10. This was working smoothly and mindful of the tighter fuel allowance, the top-20 C1 cars stayed fairly steady for the first couple of hours – the reduced strain on the engine helping with mechanical reliability. This was not the case with the C2s with the Gebhardt and both Baker Tigas delayed by engine-related problems and the Chevron retiring. The Japanese-run Mazda lost nearly 3 hours with oil-pump failure. The two Albas also failed – the privateer car being the first retirement of the race and the Finotto car delayed early on with loosening wheels. It was the Ecosse that dominated the class early on – running 11th overall during the first hour as the C1 cars were refuelling and then putting a lap on the rest of the class after two hours. However, in the third hour the car was put out when the oil pump broke.

On lap 36 Mass pitted with what started to be a series of issues – firstly replacing the Motronics box, then the gearbox, a few laps later an oil pipe, then within the hour replacing spark plugs cost 3more laps. Earlier the March had stopped at Mulsanne with injector problems and the Kremer car lost five laps with a clutch cylinder failure. The Cougar had been running in the top-10 when De Cadenet was nudged off-track when trying to overtake one the Porsches. With damage to the rear suspension, the repairs cost 40 minutes. In the early evening, after four hours, Barilla and Weaver (63 laps), working together, had put a lap on the field. The Brun cars were 3rd and 5th, split by the Wollek/Nannini Lancia. Holbert was the leading works Porsche, in 6th, with the JFR car just ahead of the Bell/Stuck car. The second Lancia was 9th with the EMKA running well in 10th. Ickx was putting in another one of his impressive comeback drives, setting the fastest lap of the race in the sixth hour, but he was then stymied having to pit to replace a gearbox oil cooler, losing another 7 minutes.

Otherwise, this measured approach by the teams continued until 9am, when Jean-Claude Andruet had a significant accident in his WM. Again, at the Mulsanne kink, a tyre blowout at top speed shot him off into the barriers. The drive emerged unharmed, but the incident brought out the pace cars for 30-minutes to repair the armco. Joest took the opportunity to put pay-driver "John Winter" in the driver's seat. He put in a single 75-minute stint before leaving the rest of the driving to his professional team-mates. Just as the safety-cars pulled off, James Weaver pitted the RLR Porsche with an engine misfire. Despite replacing the Motronic unit, he returned a few laps later. It was traced to a faulty sensor, but the time spent meant they returned to the race in 7th, two laps down. The top dozen cars were still all within two laps of each other. But that did not include the Ickx/Mass car, that had slowed on the back straight with an overheating gearbox. Limping back to the pits, the gearbox replacement took an hour, dropping them down to 30th place.

=== Night ===
At midnight, the other two works Porsches were running second and third, but neither works teams could match the pace and fuel efficiency of the leaders. Soon after though, the Bell/Stuck car pitted for the first of two wheel-bearing changes, costing Bell the chance of a 4th victory. Through the night, the Joest Porsche continued to defy expectations consistently doing an extra lap in every stint to the other teams. In contrast, the Kreepy Krauly March was having a nightmare run: Coppelli went off in the Porsche Curves, several punctures, a pair of broken wishbones, the Motronic unit and then a fuel leak. There was then a curious delay affecting several teams, including the RLR, Lancia and Brun cars, when they stopped to refuel. An official had inadvertently turned off the valve to the central fuel supply. Race director Michael Martin told the timekeepers to credit those cars with an equivalent distance to the time they had lost in waiting.

After 12 hours, Ludwig/Barilla had covered 185 laps, a lap ahead of the #3 Rothmans Porsche. The Brun car of Larrauri/Sigala/Tarquini and Wollek/Nannini Lancia were several laps back (182) with the recovering RLR car back up to 5th having passed Bell/Stuck (181). Brun's own car (179) led another clump, with the Obermeier Porsche, the second Lancia and the Kremer 962 (178) rounding out the top-10. Soon after the halfway point, Fiorio called in his leading Lancia to check the engine. The team had noticed that fuel consumption was running high. The fault was traced to cracks in the turbo from an errant stone that therefore gave too much boost and hence too much fuel. Replacing the turbo took a half-hour, dropping Wollek/Nannini down to 13th. In C2, the Martin brothers' works Mazda (18th)had been leading since sunset, with the Carma Alba seven laps back (21st) having recently taken second from the ADA Gebhardt (22nd). The Spice/Bellm Spice-Tiga had led off-and-on for 90 minutes going into the evening, but had now slipped to 4th in class (24th) after losing nearly the same amount of time fixing the oil cooler, the exhaust and the undertray. Their downforce was so much, it had bottomed out the undertray so it had detached.

As dawn approached, the Joest Porsche was running like clockwork. Klaus Ludwig commented:

"It was quite easy really, although we were only driving at 99%. We were careful to conserve the engine and we tried to use the slipstream of other cars down the straight as much as possible. If we could get a good tow, then we were able to cut back the boost a little bit and make sure we kept plenty of fuel in hand."

ACO inspectors came to the teams pit to examine the fuel-rig and hoses but could find nothing out of order. The drivers were told not to use first gear and running as low revs as they could, changing gears as little as needed. Team manager Piedade even joked with the reporters that he had hypnotised his drivers. By the end of the race he was jokingly offering his spare fuel to the other teams. After Ludwig pushed hard in the cool dawn air, the team now had a 3-lap lead over the works Porsche. The leading Lancia of Pescarolo/Baldi lost a half-hour with gear-selection problems, but thereafter both Lancias ran well for the rest of the race.

=== Morning ===
The recovery of the RLR-Porsche was completed when Palmer retook second place at 8.30am, when Schuppan had to stop and have a wheel bearing replaced, costing 9 minutes. About an hour later, Le Mans debutante Paul Belmondo was on cold tyres and just starting his new stint, when he lost control at the Dunlop Curve. After 18 hours, this was the first Porsche to retire. Promising Australian youngster Lucio Cesario, finally got his chance to drive, as a Lancia reserve driver, giving Nannini and Wollek a rest when he did a single 50-minute stint.

For the sizeable British contingent (including the Duke of Kent), after showing initial promise, both the Jaguars and EMKA had drifted back down the field. Contesting for the best non-turbo car, they had regularly swapped places through the night. Mid-morning, Tullius' Jaguar (15th) was in the pits with an engine misfire– so the engine-management box got replaced a second time. The sister-car had retired early on Sunday morning, stopping out on the circuit with a broken CV-joint. The EMKA (14th) lost 45 minutes getting its clutch replaced, and then at 10.30am, John Watson slowly brought the works Porsche into the pits. After running a strong second all through the night, its race was done by a broken crankshaft.

=== Finish and post-race ===
Palmer took over the RLR Porsche at 11am and immediately began putting in very fast laps – often 10 seconds a lap faster than the Joest car. Despite taking a lap back, Ludwig would not rise to the bait, and being three laps behind the team ordered Palmer to ease off again and conserve the car for the finish. At midday, Richard Lloyd took the car out for a one-hour stint, his only drive in the race. Soon after, Joël Gouhier had a big accident on the Hunaudières Straight when the transmission on the Brun 962 seized, launching the car into the guardrails, then flipping and rolling down the track. Crashing out of sixth place, Gouhier was able to get out and walk away. And within a half-hour, the Brun sister-car, running third, was in the pits with what proved to be terminal engine problems.

After leading the C2 class for over eleven hours, the Mazda of the Martin brothers was stopped by a bearing failure in its gearbox. The pit-crew parked the car up for the remainder of the race. Heading out 3 hours later, they had only lost one place, and finished 19th. Spice/Bellm/Galvin inherited the lead, with four hours to go, even though they were 13 laps behind them, as all the other cars in the class had had bigger issues.

In the final few hours, there were a number of cars struggling to get to the end: the Kreepy Krauly March had suffered two wishbone failures, punctures and Motronic issues had cost them much time early in the race. The Rondeau WM was staggering round with its engine sounding as if it was about to expire. With 90 minutes to go, the Jaguar pitted with severe mechanical problems. A piston had rammed into the cylinder head, but the team sealed off the cylinder and sent Tullius out again in the last minutes for a final lap. In the last hour, the March was in the pits again, but after almost 7 hours spent in the pits the crew got Copelli out in that final quarter-hour. The ADA Gebhardt broke its gearbox in the last hour. The team waited until Steve Earle took it out to take the flag. Such was the spread of the C2 class, they did not lose a place and still finished second.

The Joest Porsche continued on to take a comfortable victory. Ludwig had done the preponderance of the driving: a total of 12½ hours. He took his third overall win, while Barilla won at his third attempt after moving over from the Lancia works team. Their car, 956–117, became only the second chassis to win a consecutive Le Mans, following Ford GT40-1075 in 1968-69. The RLR Porsche of Palmer/Weaver/Lloyd was second. The works Porsche of Bell/Stuck, had got to third just before midday and held onto that to finish seven laps behind the winners. Three of the nine privateer Porsches retired, but the other six all finished in the top-10. The Fitzpatrick 956B was fourth (the car that had finished 3rd last year), with the Kremer 956 fifth and their 962 in 9th. Both Lancias finished this year, in 6th and 7th, held back by insufficient fuel economy impeding their progress. The Ickx/Mass car was the lowest placed Porsche, in 10th. The non-turbos were quite outclassed this year, and they enjoyed their own race within a race. In the end, the EMKA-Aston Martin won that, coming home in 11th, 14 laps ahead of the Tullius/Ballot-Léna/Robinson Jaguar (13th) after its late-race tribulations. Between them was the TOMs Dome, after a relatively uneventful race. The contrast between the reliability of the C1 and C2 classes was stark, with less than half the entry of 15 cars classified as finishers and all suffering a major delay of some kind. The Spice-Tiga held on for the class win (and 14th overall), fully 130 km less than the previous year, but finishing ahead of the ADA-Gebhardt by a greater margin (170 km). After leading all through the night, the Mazdaworks car scrapped its way to third, 29 laps behind. Spice Engineering would go on to win the inaugural C2 championship. Such was the mechanical attrition in the class, there were four cars not classified because they had fallen so far behind. By dint of being the only GT running at the end, when all their opponents retired in the first half of the race, the Helmut Gall BMW won Group B, repeating its win from the previous year.

Much like the 1976 Le Mans, touted by the media as an "economy run", the winners actually achieved better results than the previous years. The Joest Porsche covered 190 km (115 miles) further than they did winning the previous year. They recorded the second-fastest race speed ever at Le Mans, only exceeded by the 1971 winners. Such was their performance and fuel economy, they also won the Index prize and still had 140 litres of fuel still left over. The RLR team had similarly successful tactics: and the sensor delay that cost them three laps early on would be eventual margin of their defeat (and had 30 litres of fuel left). Not including Joest's perfect reliability, the others teams were at a loss to match their success. Ludwig explained it as a combination of running very low downforce, a carefully programmed engine-management computer and being able to moderate the turbo-boost while slipstreaming. Both teams also only drove their third, amateur, driver for just a single one-hour stint.

The response of the drivers in this race was that this year was a tactical race and technical exercise, rather than being the driving challenge it was renowned for. It was a surprise that, for once, the works Porsche were not a major factor in the race they had previously dominated. There were five Rondeaux entered but only one finished, in 18th, 83 laps behind the winner. The final chapter of the Rondeau story ended in December when 39-year old Jean Rondeau was killed in a car accident, when he tried to beat a train at a level crossing. Jacky Ickx had been to Le Mans fifteen times and won a record six times. This would be his final 24-hours after a notable career; the tenth place was a bit anticlimactic. Later in the year, at the endurance round at Spa Ickx was duelling for the lead with former team-mate Stefan Bellof. The cars collided at Eau Rouge, crashed and Bellof was killed in the impact. This followed the fatal accident to Manfred Winkelhock at the preceding round at Mosport in Canada. A third serious accident at practice for Spa had broken the leg of Jonathon Palmer. In all three instances, the drivers legs were trapped forcing the Porsche engineers to do an investigation on the structural safety of their car. After a competitive, traumatic year, the Rothmans Porsche works team won the inaugural Teams Championship. Stuck and Bell won the Drivers Championship.

== Official results ==
=== Finishers ===
Results taken from Quentin Spurring's book, officially licensed by the ACO
Class winners are in Bold text.

Pos	Class	No.	Team	Drivers	Chassis	Engine	Tyre	Laps
1	**Gr.C1**	**7**	**(West Germany) NewMan Joest Racing**	**(West Germany) Klaus Ludwig** **(Italy) Paolo Barilla** **(West Germany) "John Winter" (Louis Krages)**	Porsche 956B	Porsche 935/79 2.6L F6 twin turbo	D	374
2	Gr.C1	14	(United Kingdom) Canon Racing (United Kingdom) Richard Lloyd Racing (United Kingdom) GTi Engineering	(United Kingdom) Jonathan Palmer (United Kingdom) James Weaver (United Kingdom) Richard Lloyd	Porsche 956 GTi	Porsche 935/79 2.6L F6 twin turbo	G	371
3	Gr.C1	2	(West Germany) Rothmans Porsche	(United Kingdom) Derek Bell (West Germany) Hans-Joachim Stuck	Porsche 962C	Porsche 935/76 2.6L F6 twin turbo	D	367
4	Gr.C1	33	(United Kingdom) Fitzpatrick Porsche Team	(Austria) Jo Gartner (United Kingdom) David Hobbs (United Kingdom) Guy Edwards	Porsche 956B	Porsche 935/79 2.6L F6 twin turbo	Y	366
5	Gr.C1	10	(West Germany) Barclay Kremer Racing	(South Africa) George Fouché (South Africa) Sarel van der Merwe (Sweden) / (Switzerland) Mario Hytten	Porsche 956B	Porsche 935/79 2.6L F6 twin turbo	G	361
6	Gr.C1	4	(Italy) Lancia Martini	(France) Bob Wollek (Italy) Alessandro Nannini (Australia) Lucio Cesario	Lancia LC2	Ferrari 308C 3.0L V8 twin turbo	M	360
7	Gr.C1	5	(Italy) Lancia Martini	(France) Henri Pescarolo (Italy) Mauro Baldi	Lancia LC2	Ferrari 308C 3.0L V8 twin turbo	M	358
8	Gr.C1	26	(West Germany) Ducados Obermaier Racing	(West Germany) Jürgen Lässig (Spain) Jesús Pareja (Belgium) Hervé Regout	Porsche 956	Porsche 935/79 2.6L F6 twin turbo	G	357
9	Gr.C1	11	(West Germany) Kenwood Kremer Racing	(France) Jean-Pierre Jarier (New Zealand) Mike Thackwell (Austria) Franz Konrad	Porsche 962C	Porsche 935/76 2.6L F6 twin turbo	G	356
10	Gr.C1	1	(West Germany) Rothmans Porsche	(Belgium) Jacky Ickx (West Germany) Jochen Mass	Porsche 962C	Porsche 935/76 2.6L F6 twin turbo	D	348
11	Gr.C1	66	(United Kingdom) EMKA Productions	(United Kingdom) Steve O'Rourke (United Kingdom) Tiff Needell (United Kingdom) Nick Faure	EMKA C83B	Aston Martin DP1229 5.3L V8	D	338
12	Gr.C1	36	(Japan) TOM'S	(Japan) Satoru Nakajima (Japan) Masanori Sekiya (Japan) Kaoru Hoshino	Dome RC85C-L	Toyota 4T-GT 2.1L S4 turbo	B	330
13	**IMSA**; **GTP**	**44**	**(United States) Group 44 Racing**	**(United States) Bob Tullius** **(France) Claude Ballot-Léna** **(United States) Chip Robinson**	Jaguar XJR-5	Jaguar 6.0L V12	G	324
14	**Gr.C2**	**70**	**(United Kingdom) Spice Engineering**	**(United Kingdom) Gordon Spice** **(United Kingdom) Ray Bellm** **(Republic of Ireland) Mark Galvin**	Spice-Tiga GC85	Cosworth DFL 3.3L V8	A	312
15	**Gr.B**	**151**	**(West Germany) H. Gall** (private entrant)	**(West Germany) Edgar Dören** **(Republic of Ireland) Martin Birrane** **(Belgium) Jean-Paul Libert**	BMW M1	BMW M88 3.5L S6	D	312
16	Gr.C2	75	(United Kingdom) ADA Engineering	(United Kingdom) Ian Harrower (United States) Steve Earle (United Kingdom) John Sheldon	Gebhardt JC843	Cosworth DFL 3.3 L V8	A	299
17	Gr.C1	42	(France) WM Secateva	(France) Michel Pignard (France) Jean-Daniel Raulet (France) Jean Rondeau	WM P83B	Peugeot PRV ZNS4 2.8L; V6 twin-turbo	M	299
18	Gr.C1	39	(France) Bussi Racing (private entrant)	(France) Bruno Sotty (France) Jean-Claude Justice (France) Patrick Oudet	Rondeau M382	Cosworth DFL 3.3 L V8	D	291
19	Gr.C2	86	(Japan) Mazdaspeed	(Republic of Ireland) David Kennedy (Belgium) Jean-Michel Martin (Belgium) Philippe Martin	Mazda 737C	Mazda 13B 1308cc twin-rotary	D	283
20	Gr.C1	13	(France) Courage Compétition (France) Compagnie Primagaz	(France) Yves Courage (United Kingdom) Alain de Cadenet (France) Jean-François Yvon	Cougar C12	Porsche 935/76 2.6L F6 twin turbo	M	279
21	Gr.C2	99	(United Kingdom) Roy Baker Promotions (private entrant)	(United Kingdom) Paul Smith (United Kingdom) Will Hoy (United States) Nick Nicholson	Tiga GC285	Cosworth BDT 1778cc S4 turbo	A	274
22	Gr.C1	34	(South Africa) Kreepy Krauly Racing	(West Germany) Christian Danner (Italy) Almo Coppelli (South Africa) Graham Duxbury	March 84G	Porsche 935/76 2.6L F6 twin turbo	Y	270
23	Gr.C2	95	(France) Bellanger-Bassaler (private entrant)	(France) Roland Bassaler (France) Dominique Lacaud (France) Yvon Tapy	Sauber SHS C6	BMW M88 3.5L S6	A	268
24	Gr.C2	85	(Japan) Mazdaspeed	(Japan) Yojiro Terada (Japan) Takashi Yorino (Japan) Yoshimi Katayama	Mazda 737C	Mazda 13B 1308cc twin-rotary	D	264
N/C*	Gr.C2	77	(United Kingdom) Spice Engineering	(United Kingdom) Tim Lee-Davey (Australia) Neil Crang (United Kingdom) Tony Lanfranchi	Tiga GC84	Cosworth DFV 3.0 L V8	D	226
N/C*	Gr.C2	74	(West Germany) Gebhardt Engineering (West Germany) Team Labatt	(West Germany) Frank Jelinski (Canada) John Graham (United Kingdom) Nick Adams	Gebhardt JC853	Cosworth DFV 3.0 L V8	A	224
N/C*	Gr.C2	98	(United Kingdom) Roy Baker Promotions	(United Kingdom) François Duret (United Kingdom) David Andrews (United Kingdom) Duncan Bain	Tiga GC284	Cosworth BDT 1778cc S4 turbo	A	150
N/C*	Gr.C2	93	(France) Automobiles; Louis Descartes (private entrant)	(France) Louis Descartes (France) Jacques Heuclin (France) Daniel Hubert	ALD 01	BMW M88 3.5L S6	A	141

- Note *: Not classified because did not cover sufficient distance (70% of the winner) by the race's end.

=== Did not finish ===
Pos	Class	No	Team	Drivers	Chassis	Engine	Tyre	Laps	Reason
DNF	Gr.C1	18	(Switzerland) Brun Motorsport	(Italy) Massimo Sigala (Argentina) Oscar Larrauri (Italy) Gabriele Tarquini	Porsche 956	Porsche 935/79 2.6L F6 twin turbo	D	323	Engine (24hr)
DNF	Gr.C1	19	(Switzerland) Brun Motorsport	(Switzerland) Walter Brun (France) Joël Gouhier (Belgium) Didier Theys	Porsche 962C	Porsche 935/76 2.6L F6 twin turbo	D	304	Accident (22hr)
DNF	Gr.C1	3	(West Germany) Rothmans Porsche	(United States) Al Holbert (Australia) Vern Schuppan (United Kingdom) John Watson	Porsche 962C	Porsche 935/76 2.6L F6 twin turbo	D	299	Engine (21hr)
DNF	Gr.C1	31	(France) Rondeau-Primagaz (France) P. Yver (private entrant)	(France) Pierre Yver (France) Pierre-François Rousselot (France) François Sérvanin	Rondeau M382	Cosworth DFV 3.0L V8	D	286	Engine (23hr)
DNF	Gr.C1	8	(West Germany) NewMan Joest Racing	(France) Paul Belmondo (Colombia) Mauricio de Narváez (United States) Kenper Miller	Porsche 956	Porsche 935/79 2.6L F6 twin turbo	D	277	Accident (19hr)
DSQ	Gr.C1	41	(France) WM Secateva	(France) Pascal Pessiot (France) Dominique Fornage (France) “Panic” (Jacques Barberot)	WM P83B	Peugeot PRV ZNS4 2.8L; V6 twin-turbo	M	267	Found underweight at post-race scrutineering (24hr)
DNF	Gr.C2	80	(Italy) Carma FF	(Italy) Martino Finotto (Italy) Aldo Bertuzzi (Italy) Guido Daccò	Alba AR6	Carma FF 1915cc S4 turbo	A	228	Electrics (19hr)
DNF	IMSA; GTP	40	(United States) Group 44 Racing	(United Kingdom) Brian Redman (United States) Hurley Haywood (United States) Jim Adams	Jaguar XJR-5	Jaguar 6.0L V12	G	151	Transmission (13hr)
DNF	Gr.C1	67	(France) Graff Racing (France) J.-P. Grand (private entrant)	(France) Patrick Gonin (Belgium) Pascal Witmeur (France) Pierre de Thoisy	Rondeau M482	Cosworth DFL 3.3L V8	M	143	Engine (12hr)
DNF	Gr.C1	38	(Japan) Dome Company	(Sweden) Eje Elgh (United Kingdom) Geoff Lees (Japan) Toshio Suzuki	Dome 85C-L	Toyota 4T-GT 2.1L S4 turbo	D	141	Transmission (13hr)
DNF	Gr.C2	90	Jens Winther Denmark (private entrant)	(Denmark) Jens Winther (United Kingdom) David Mercer (United States) Margie Smith-Haas	URD C83	BMW M88 3.5L S6	A	141	Engine (12hr)
DNF	Gr.B	157	(Switzerland) A. Pallavicini (private entrant)	(Switzerland) Angelo Pallavicini (Switzerland) Enzo Calderari (Switzerland) Marco Vanoli	BMW M1	BMW M88 3.5L S6	A	116	Engine (11hr)
DNF	Gr.B	156	(France) R. Touroul (private entrant)	(France) Raymond Touroul (France) Thierry Perrier (France) Philippe Dermagne	Porsche 911 SC	Porsche 3.0L F6	P	107	Engine (10hr)
DNF	Gr.C1	43 reserve	(France) WM Secateva	(France) Roger Dorchy (France) Jean-Claude Andruet (Switzerland) Claude Haldi	WM P83B	Peugeot PRV ZNS4 2.8L; V6 twin-turbo	M	73	Accident (8hr)
DNF	Gr.C2	104 reserve	(France) Écurie Blanchet-Locatop (private entrant)	(France) Michel Dubois (France) Hubert Striebig (France) Noël del Bello	Rondeau M379C	Cosworth DFV 3.0 L V8	A	65	Suspension (7hr)
DNF	Gr.C1	24	Cheetah Automobiles; Switzerland	(Belgium) Claude Bourgoignie (United Kingdom) John Cooper	Cheetah G604	Aston Martin 5.3L V8	D	53	Accident (7hr)
DNF	Gr.C2	79	(United Kingdom) Ecurie Ecosse	(United Kingdom) David Leslie (United Kingdom) Mike Wilds (United Kingdom) Ray Mallock	Ecosse C285	Cosworth DFV 3.0L V8	A	45	Oil pump (4hr)
DNF	Gr.C1	46 reserve	(France) Bussi Racing (France) R. Bassaler (private entrant)	(France) Christian Bussi (United States) Jack Griffin (United States) Marion Speer	Rondeau M482	Cosworth DFL 3.3L V8	M	36	Suspension (4hr)
DNF	Gr.B	152	(Switzerland) Vogelsang Automobile (private entrant)	(West Germany) Harald Grohs (West Germany) Altfrid Heger (West Germany) Kurt König	BMW M1	BMW M88 3.5L S6	D	32	Transmission (4hr)
DNF	Gr.C2	100	(United Kingdom) Bartlett Chevron Racing (private entrant) (United Kingdom) Goodmans Sound	(Morocco) Max Cohen-Olivar (United Kingdom) Richard Jones (United Kingdom) Robin Smith	Chevron B62	Cosworth DFL 3.3L V8	A	19	Engine (3hr)
DNF	Gr.C2	82	(Italy) Grifo Autoracing (private entrant)	(Italy) Paolo Giangrossi (Italy) Pasquale Barberio (Italy) Mario Radicella	Alba AR3	Cosworth DFL 3.3L V8	D	5	Electrics (9hr)

=== Did not start ===
Pos	Class	No	Team	Drivers	Chassis	Engine	Tyre	Reason
DNS	Gr.C1	61	(Switzerland) Sauber Racing	(Denmark) John Nielsen (Austria) Dieter Quester (Switzerland) Max Welti	Sauber C8	Mercedes-Benz M117 5.0L V8 turbo	D	Practice Accident
DNS	Gr.C2	81	(Italy) Carma FF	(Switzerland) Loris Kessel (Italy) Ruggero Melgrati (Switzerland) Jean-Pierre Frey	Alba AR2	Carma FF 1915cc S4 turbo	A	Practice Accident
DNS	Gr.C2	97	(Sweden) B. Strandell (private entrant)	(Sweden) Stanley Dickens (Norway) Targeir Kleppe	Strandell 85	Porsche 930/60 3.3L F6 turbo	A	Engine
DNQ	Gr.C1	55	(United Kingdom) Fitzpatrick Porsche Team	(United Kingdom) Kenny Acheson (United Kingdom) Dudley Wood (France) Jean-Louis Schlesser	Porsche 962C	Porsche 935/76 2.6L F6 twin turbo	Y	Practice Accident
DNQ	Gr.C2	106 reserve	(France) B. Sotty (private entrant)	(West Germany) Martin Wagenstätter (West Germany) Kurt Hild	Lotec C302	Cosworth DFV 3.0L V8	D	Did not qualify
DNA	Gr.C1	6	(Italy) Lancia Martini		Lancia LC2	Ferrari 308C 3.0L V8 twin turbo	M	Withdrawn
DNA	Gr.C1	16	(United Kingdom) Canon Racing (United Kingdom) Richard Lloyd Racing (United Kingdom) GTi Engineering	(United Kingdom) Jonathan Palmer (Netherlands) Jan Lammers	Porsche 956	Porsche 935/79 2.6L F6 twin turbo	G	Withdrawn
DNA	Gr.C1	23	Cheetah Automobiles; Switzerland		Cheetah G604	Aston Martin 5.3L V8	D	Withdrawn
DNA	Gr.C1	32	(United Kingdom) Dorset Racing Associates	(Republic of Ireland) Martin Birrane (United Kingdom) Tony Birchenhough	Dome RC82i	Cosworth DFV 3.0L V8		Did not arrive
DNA	Gr.C1	51	(United Kingdom) Tom Walkinshaw Racing; Silk Cut Jaguar	(Belgium) Thierry Tassin (West Germany) Hans Heyer	Jaguar XJR-6	Jaguar 6.0L V12		Did not arrive
DNA	Gr.C1	52	(United Kingdom) Tom Walkinshaw Racing; Silk Cut Jaguar	(United Kingdom) David Hobbs (France) Jean-Louis Schlesser	Jaguar XJR-6	Jaguar 6.0L V12		Did not arrive
DNA	Gr.C1	53	(United Kingdom) Tom Walkinshaw Racing; Silk Cut Jaguar		Jaguar XJR-6	Jaguar 6.0L V12		Did not arrive
DNA	Gr.C1	54	(Switzerland) Sauber Racing		Sauber C8	Mercedes-Benz M117 5.0L V8 turbo	D	Did not arrive
DNA	Gr.C1	62	(Switzerland) Sauber Racing		Sauber C8	Mercedes-Benz M117 5.0L V8 turbo	D	Did not arrive
DNA	Gr.C1	63	(United Kingdom) Team Harrier (private entrant)		Harrier RX83C	Chevrolet 5.7L V8		Did not arrive
DNA	Gr.C1	68	(France) Bussi Racing (private entrant)		Rondeau M382	Cosworth DFL 3.3 L V8	D	Did not arrive
DNA	Gr.C1	69	(France) Graff Racing (France) J.-P. Grand (private entrant)		Rondeau M382	Cosworth DFL 3.3 L V8	D	Did not arrive
DNA	Gr.C2	72	(West Germany) Gebhardt Engineering	(West Germany) Jan Thoelke	Gebhardt JC853	Cosworth DFV 3.0 L V8	A	Did not arrive
DNA	Gr.C2	76	(United Kingdom) Spice Engineering		Tiga GC84	Cosworth DFV 3.0 L V8	D	Did not arrive
DNA	Gr.C2	91	(United Kingdom) Lyncar Motorsport	(Spain) Emilio de Villota (Greece) Costas Los (Sweden) Mikael Nabrink	Lyncar MS83B	Cosworth DFV 3.0 L V8		Did not arrive
DNA	Gr.C2	94	(United Kingdom) Lanx Engineering	(South Africa) Glenn Loxton (United Kingdom) Dudley Wood (United Kingdom) David Sears	Argo JM16	Cosworth DFV 3.0 L V8		Did not arrive
DNA	Gr.C2	102	(France) A. Bellanger (private entrant)		Sauber SHS C6	BMW M88 3.5L S6		Did not arrive
DNA	Gr.B	152	(Switzerland) C. Haldi (private entrant)	(Switzerland) Claude Haldi	Porsche 930	Porsche 930/60 3.3L F6 turbo	M	Did not arrive
DNA	IMSA; GTO	170	(United States) Road Circuit Technology	(United States) Tommy Riggins (United States) Les Delano	Pontiac Firebird	Pontiac 5.9L V8		Did not arrive
DNA	IMSA; GTO	171	(United States) Road Circuit Technology	(United States) Patty Moise (United States) Andy Petery	Pontiac Firebird	Pontiac 5.9L V8		Did not arrive
DNA	IMSA; GTO	171	(United States) Roush-Protolab Racing	(United States) Harry "Doc" Bundy (United States) Wally Dallenbach Jr. (Canada) John Jones	Ford Mustang	Ford 6.1L V8		Did not arrive

=== Class winners ===
Class	Winning car	Winning drivers
Group C1	#7 Porsche 956B	Ludwig / Barilla / "Winter" *
IMSA-GTP	#44 Jaguar XJR-5	Tullius / Ballot-Léna / Robinson *
Group C2	#75 Tiga GC85	Spice / Bellm / Galvin
Group B	#151 BMW M1	Dören / Birrane / Libert *

- Note: setting a new class distance record.

=== Index of Energy Efficiency ===
Pos	Class	No	Team	Drivers	Chassis	Score
1	Gr.C1	7	(West Germany) NewMan Joest Racing	(West Germany) Klaus Ludwig (Italy) Paolo Barilla (West Germany) "John Winter" (Louis Krages)	Porsche 956B	1.225
2	Gr.C1	14	(United Kingdom) Canon Racing (United Kingdom) Richard Lloyd Racing (United Kingdom) GTi Engineering	(United Kingdom) Jonathan Palmer (United Kingdom) James Weaver (United Kingdom) Richard Lloyd	Porsche 956 GTi	1.196
3	Gr.C1	1	(West Germany) Rothmans Porsche	(Belgium) Jacky Ickx (West Germany) Jochen Mass	Porsche 962C	1.152
4	Gr.C1	2	(West Germany) Rothmans Porsche	(United Kingdom) Derek Bell (West Germany) Hans-Joachim Stuck	Porsche 962C	1.107
5	Gr.C1	33	(United Kingdom) Fitzpatrick Porsche Team	(Austria) Jo Gartner (United Kingdom) David Hobbs (United Kingdom) Guy Edwards	Porsche 956B	1.088
6	Gr.C1	10	(West Germany) Barclay Kremer Racing	(South Africa) George Fouché (South Africa) Sarel van der Merwe (Sweden) / (Switzerland) Mario Hytten	Porsche 956B	1.040
7	Gr.C1	4	(Italy) Lancia Martini	(France) Bob Wollek (Italy) Alessandro Nannini (Australia) Lucio Cesario	Lancia LC2	1.026
8	Gr.C2	70	(United Kingdom) Spice Engineering	(United Kingdom) Gordon Spice (United Kingdom) Ray Bellm (Republic of Ireland) Mark Galvin	Spice-Tiga GC85	0.816
9	Gr.C1	11	(West Germany) Kenwood Kremer Racing	(France) Jean-Pierre Jarier (New Zealand) Mike Thackwell (Austria) Franz Konrad	Porsche 962C	0.949
10	IMSA; GTP	44	(United States) Group 44 Racing	(United States) Bob Tullius (France) Claude Ballot-Léna (United States) Chip Robinson	Jaguar XJR-5	0.938

- Note: Only the top ten positions are included in this set of standings.

=== Statistics ===
Taken from Quentin Spurring's book, officially licensed by the ACO

- Pole Position –H.-J. Stuck, #2 Porsche 962C– 3:14.8secs; 251.2 km/h (156.1 mph)
- Fastest lap – J. Ickx, #1 Porsche 962C – 3:25.1secs; 239.2 km/h (148.6 mph)
- Winning distance – 5,088.51 km (3,161.85 mi)
- Winner's average speed – 212.02 km/h (131.74 mph)
- Attendance – 80,000 / 160,000.

== Notes ==
World Sportscar Championship
Previous race: 1985 1000 km of Silverstone	1985 season	Next race: 1985 1000 km of Hockenheim
