= Dieter Quester =

Austrian racing driver (born 1939)

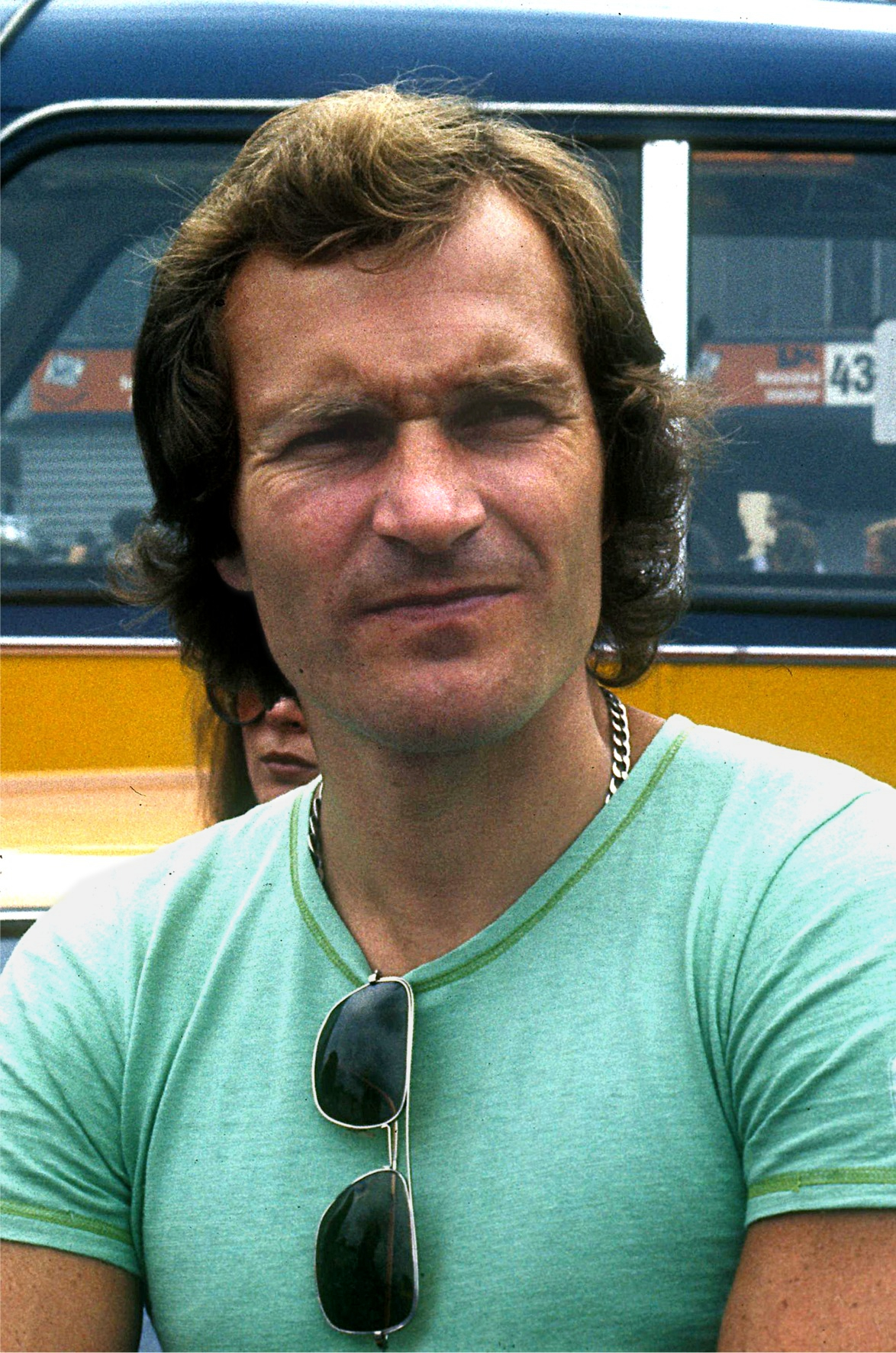
- Quester in 1973
- Born: Dietrich Erwin Quester; 30 May 1939 (age 87); Vienna, Austria

Formula One World Championship career
- Nationality: (Austria) Austrian
- Active years: 1969, 1974
- Team(s): BMW, Surtees
- Entries: 2 (1 start)
- Championships: 0
- Career points: 0
- First entry: 1969 German Grand Prix
- Last entry: 1974 Austrian Grand Prix

Dietrich Erwin Quester (born 30 May 1939) is an Austrian former racing driver. Quester participated in 53 24-Hour Races. He competed in a single Formula One race in which he finished ninth.

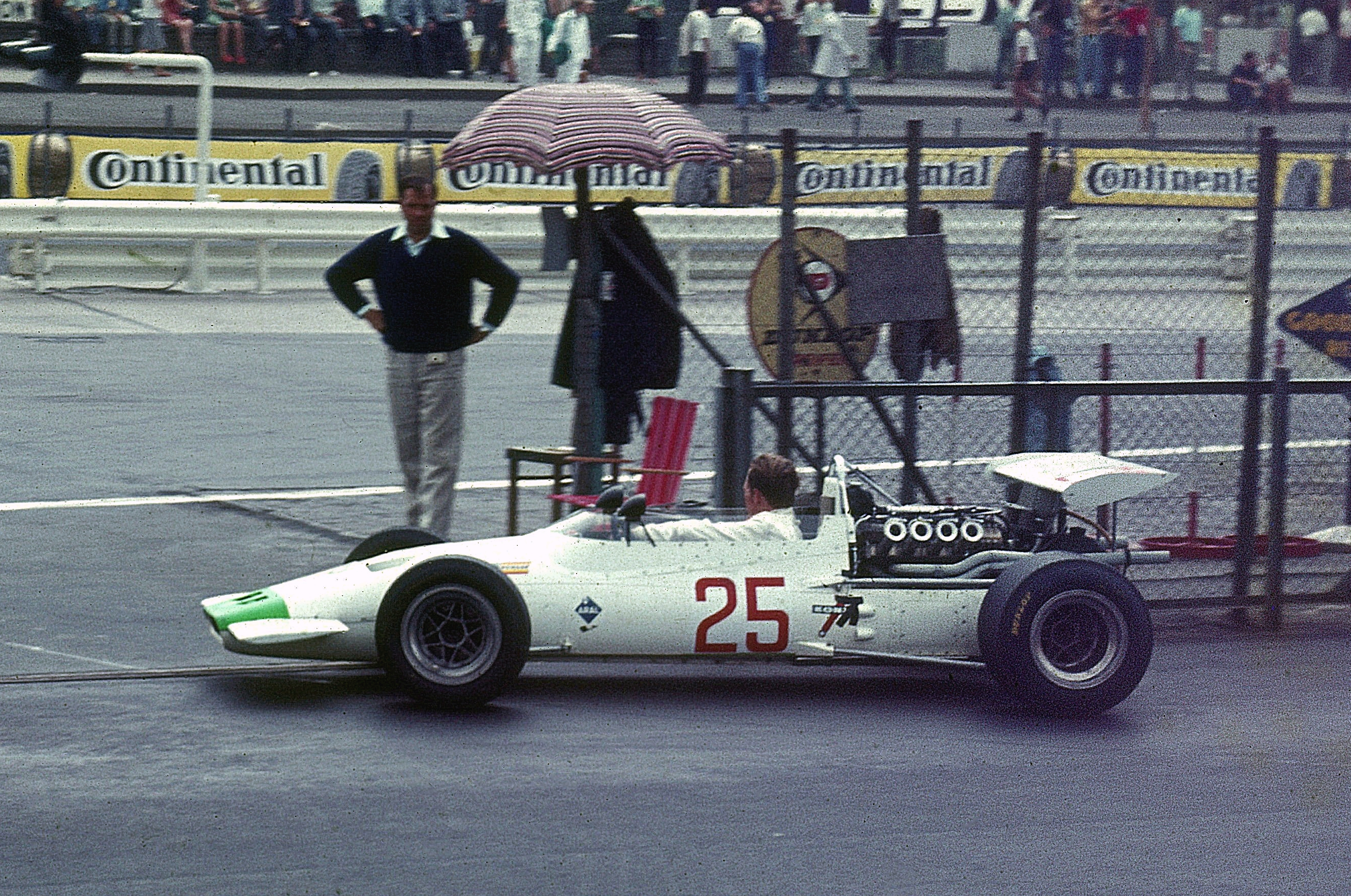
Quester at the wheel of the BMW 269 during practice for the 1969 German Grand Prix at the Nürburgring.

Starting with motorboats in the 1950s, Quester became part of the Formula 2 team of BMW which intended to take part in the 1969 German Grand Prix. Teammate Gerhard Mitter was killed at the Nürburgring while practising with the BMW 269, though. As a suspension or steering failure was suspected, the BMW team with Quester and Hubert Hahne withdrew from the race, as did Mitter's teammate at Porsche, Hans Herrmann.

Quester participated in his home 1974 Austrian Grand Prix on 18 August 1974. He out-qualified his three team mates at Surtees and finished ninth ahead of Hans-Joachim Stuck and double World Champion Graham Hill in the race, but scored no championship points.

Quester then focused again on European Touring Car Championship to drive a BMW 3.0 CSL for Schnitzer Motorsport. Quester had already won the 1973 Spa 24 Hours. Later racing in the DTM, he once slid on the roof of his BMW M3 over the start/finish line of the AVUS for a third place.

Quester's career was still active at age 70, sponsored by Red Bull. On 15 January 2006, he won the 24 Hours race at the Dubai Autodrome on a BMW M3 together with Hans-Joachim Stuck, Philipp Peter and Toto Wolff. Stuck and Quester returned in the 24 Hours Nürburgring, but their BMW was destroyed in a crash at night that involved an oil spill and seven cars. During the weekend of 9–10 September 2006, he won the Britcar 24 Hours of Silverstone in a Duller Motorsport BMW M Roadster#Z4 M Roadster (2006–2008), and on 14 January 2007, he again won the 24 Hours race at the Dubai Autodrome in the Duller Motorsport BMW Z4 (E85). In September 2007 he and Duller won the 24 Hours of Silverstone in the Duller BMW Z4 (E85), by a margin of 30 laps.

Quester took part in his final race at the HSR Classic Daytona in November 2018 at the age of 79.

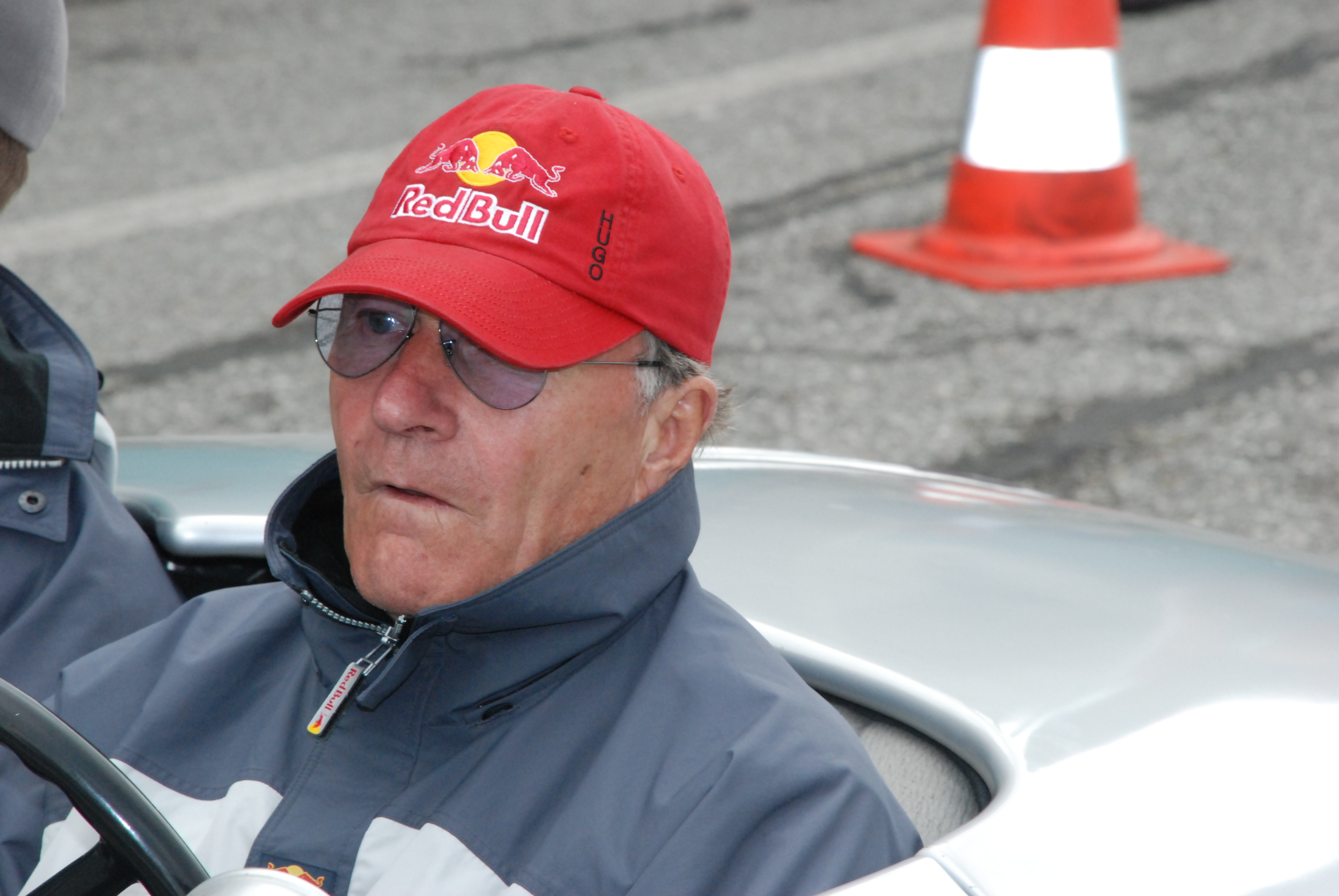
Dieter Quester, 2008

== Racing record ==
=== Complete European Formula Two Championship results ===
(key) (Races in bold indicate pole position; races in italics indicate fastest lap)

Year	Entrant	Chassis	Engine	1	2	3	4	5	6	7	8	9	10	11	12	13	14	Pos.	Pts
1969	BMW	BMW 269	BMW M11	THR	HOC	NÜR	JAR	TUL; Ret	PER	VAL; Ret								NC	0
1970	BMW	BMW 269	BMW M11	THR; 7	HOC; Ret	BAR; 5	ROU; DNQ	PER; Ret	TUL; Ret	IMO; Ret								4th	14
1970	BMW	BMW 270	BMW M11								HOC; 1							4th	14
1971	Eifelland Wohnwagenbau	Brabham BT30	Cosworth FVA	HOC; Ret	THR													3rd	31
1971	Eifelland Wohnwagenbau	March 712M	BMW M11			NÜR; Ret	JAR; 2	PAL; Ret	ROU; 2	MAN; 10	TUL; 3	ALB; Ret	VAL; 2	VAL; 2				3rd	31
1972	Matchbox Team Surtees	Surtees TS10	Ford BDA	MAL	THR	HOC	PAU	PAL	HOC	ROU	ÖST; Ret	IMO	MAN	PER	SAL	ALB	HOC	NC	0
1974	Team Harper	March 742	BMW	BAR	HOC; Ret	PAU; DNS												NC	0
1974	Team Harper	Chevron B27	Ford BDA				SAL; 11	HOC; Ret	MUG; Ret	KAR; NC	PER	HOC	VAL					NC	0

=== Complete Formula One results ===
(key) (Races in bold indicate pole position, races in italics indicate fastest lap)

Year	Entrant	Chassis	Engine	1	2	3	4	5	6	7	8	9	10	11	12	13	14	15	WDC	Pts
1969	Bayerische Motoren Werke	BMW 269	BMW M12/1 1.6 L4	RSA	ESP	MON	NED	FRA	GBR	GER; DNS	ITA	CAN	USA	MEX					NC	0
1974	Memphis International Team Surtees	Surtees TS16	Ford Cosworth DFV 3.0 V8	ARG	BRA	RSA	ESP	BEL	MON	SWE	NED	FRA	GBR	GER	AUT; 9	ITA	CAN	USA	NC	0

=== Complete British Saloon Car Championship results ===
(key) (Races in bold indicate pole position; races in italics indicate fastest lap.)

Year	Team	Car	Class	1	2	3	4	5	6	7	8	9	10	11	12	Pos.	Pts	Class
1969	BMW	BMW 2002 TI	C	BRH	SIL	**SNE**; Ret	**THR**; Ret	SIL	CRY	MAL	CRO	SIL	OUL	BRH	BRH	NC	0	NC
1973	BMW Motorsport	BMW 3.0 CSL	D	BRH	SIL	THR	THR	SIL	ING	BRH	SIL; 17	BRH				59th	1	11th
1978	BMW (GB)	BMW 530i	D	SIL	OUL	THR	BRH	SIL; 7†	DON	MAL	BRH; Ret	DON	BRH	THR	OUL	39th	2	12th

† Events with 2 races staged for the different classes.|}

=== Complete 24 Hours of Le Mans results ===
Year	Team	Co-Drivers	Car	Class	Laps	Pos.	Class Pos.
1973	(Germany) BMW Motorsport	(Netherlands) Toine Hezemans	BMW 3.0 CSL	T 5.0	307	11th	**1st**
1976	(Germany) BMW Motorsport GmbH	(Germany) Albrecht Krebs (Belgium) Alain Peltier	BMW 3.5 CSL	Gr.5	117	DNF	DNF
1978	(United Kingdom) BMW Great Britain (United Kingdom) Tolemans Racing	(United Kingdom) Tom Walkinshaw (South Africa) Rad Dougall	Osella PA6-BMW	S 2.0	113	DNF	DNF
1979	(United Kingdom) March Racing	(United Kingdom) Guy Edwards (United Kingdom) Ian Grob	BMW M1	S +2.0	-	DNQ	DNQ
1980	B.M.W. France	(France) Didier Pironi (France) Marcel Mignot	BMW M1	IMSA	293	14th	4th
1981	(Switzerland) Würth-Lubrifilm Team Sauber	(Switzerland) Marc Surer (Canada) David Deacon	BMW M1	Gr.5	207	DNF	DNF
1982	(Germany) BASF Cassetten Team GS Sport	(Germany) Hans-Joachim Stuck (France) Jean-Louis Schlesser	Sauber SHS C6-Ford	C	76	DNF	DNF
1983	(United Kingdom) John Fitzpatrick Racing	(United Kingdom) John Fitzpatrick (United Kingdom) David Hobbs	Porsche 956	C	135	DNF	DNF
1985	(Switzerland) Sauber Racing	(Denmark) John Nielsen (Switzerland) Max Welti	Sauber C8-Mercedes	C1	-	DNS	DNS
1986	(Switzerland) Kouros Racing Team	(France) Henri Pescarolo (Germany) Christian Danner	Sauber C8-Mercedes	C1	86	DNF	DNF

=== Complete Deutsche Tourenwagen Meisterschaft results ===
(key) (Races in bold indicate pole position) (Races in italics indicate fastest lap)

Year	Team	Car	1	2	3	4	5	6	7	8	9	10	11	12	13	14	15	16	17	18	19	20	21	22	23	24	Pos.	Pts
1988	BMW M Team Linder	BMW M3	ZOL; 1; 10	ZOL; 2; 13	HOC; 1; 5	HOC; 2; 4	NÜR; 1; 26	NÜR; 2; 13	BRN; 1; 6	BRN; 2; 10	AVU; 1; 5	AVU; 2; 17	MFA; 1; 8	MFA; 2; 7	NÜR; 1 Ret	NÜR; 2; 6	NOR; 1; 12	NOR; 2; 18									9th	167
1988	BMW M Team Linder	BMW M3 Evo																	WUN; 1; 10	WUN; 2; 13	SAL; 1 C	SAL; 2 C	HUN; 1; 9	HUN; 2; 9	HOC; 1 Ret	HOC; 2; 25	9th	167
1989	BMW M Team Zakspeed	BMW M3 Evo	ZOL; 1; 7	ZOL; 2; 14	HOC; 1; 12	HOC; 2; 9	NÜR; 1; 4	NÜR; 2; 3	MFA; 1 DNQ	MFA; 2; 3	AVU; 1; 7	AVU; 2 Ret	NÜR; 1 Ret	NÜR; 2 DNS	NOR; 1; 8	NOR; 2; 5	HOC; 1; 10	HOC; 2 Ret	DIE; 1	DIE; 2	NÜR; 1	NÜR; 2	HOC; 1	HOC; 2			15th	127
1990	BMW M Team Zakspeed	BMW M3 Sport Evo	ZOL; 1 Ret	ZOL; 2 DNS	HOC; 1 Ret	HOC; 2 DNS	NÜR; 1 Ret	NÜR; 2 DNS	AVU; 1; 3	AVU; 2; 9	MFA; 1; 10	MFA; 2; 12	WUN; 1; 23	WUN; 2 DNS	NÜR; 1; 8	NÜR; 2 Ret	NOR; 1; 12	NOR; 2 Ret	DIE; 1; 13	DIE; 2; 9	NÜR; 1; 15	NÜR; 2; 11	HOC; 1 Ret	HOC; 2 DNS			20th	20
1991	Linder M Team	BMW M3 Sport Evo	ZOL; 1; 24	ZOL; 2 Ret	HOC; 1; 15	HOC; 2; 27	NÜR; 1 Ret	NÜR; 2 DNS	AVU; 1; 18	AVU; 2 Ret	WUN; 1; 14	WUN; 2; 17	NOR; 1; 15	NOR; 2; 12	DIE; 1 Ret	DIE; 2 DNS	NÜR; 1; 16	NÜR; 2 Ret	ALE; 1	ALE; 2	HOC; 1	HOC; 2	BRN; 1; 19	BRN; 2; 12	DON; 1; 13	DON; 2 Ret	NC	0

=== Complete Super Tourenwagen Cup results ===
(key) (Races in bold indicate pole position) (Races in italics indicate fastest lap)

Year	Team	Car	1	2	3	4	5	6	7	8	Pos.	Pts
1994	BMW Team Isert	BMW 318i	AVU	WUN	ZOL	ZAN	ÖST; 16	SAL; 13	SPA	NÜR	28th	0

=== Complete FIA GT Championship results ===
(key) (Races in bold indicate pole position) (Races in italics indicate fastest lap)

Year	Team	Car	Class	1	2	3	4	5	6	7	8	9	10	11	Pos.	Pts
1997	Viper Team Oreca	Chrysler Viper GTS-R	GT2	HOC	SIL	HEL	NÜR	SPA	A1R; 3	SUZ	DON	MUG	SEB	LAG	25th	4
2000	RWS Red Bull Racing	Porsche 911 GT3-R	N-GT	VAL	EST	MNZ	SIL	HUN; 4	ZOL	A1R; Ret	LAU; 1	BRN; 2	MAG; 2		6th	25
2001	RWS Motorsport	Porsche 911 GT3-RS	N-GT	MNZ; 2	BRN; 1	MAG; 2	SIL	ZOL	HUN	SPA; 1	A1R; Ret	NÜR; 6	JAR; 2		4th	52
2001	RWS Motorsport	Porsche 911 GT3-R	N-GT											EST; 4	4th	52
2002	RWS Motorsport	Porsche 911 GT	GT	MAG; Ret	SIL; 7	BRN; 10	JAR	AND	OSC						NC	0
2002	Dart Racing	Ferrari 550 Maranello	GT								PER; Ret	DON; Ret	EST; Ret		NC	0
2002	RWS Motorsport	Porsche 911 GT3-R	N-GT							SPA; Ret					29th	3.5

=== Britcar 24 Hour results ===
Year	Team	Co-Drivers	Car	Car No.	Class	Laps	Pos.	Class Pos.
2007	(Austria) Duller Motorsport	(United Kingdom) Jamie Campbell-Walter (Austria) Johannes Stuck (Germany) Dirk Werner	BMW Z4 M Coupé	1	GT3	596	**1st**	**1st**

Sporting positions
Preceded by Karl von Wendt	European Touring Car Championship; Champion (Div.3); 1968-1969	Succeeded by Toine Hezemans
Preceded by Kevin Bartlett	Macau Grand Prix; Winner; 1970	Succeeded by Jan Bussell
Preceded by Jean Xhenceval and Pierre Dieudonné	European Touring Car Championship; Champion; 1977	Succeeded by Umberto Grano
Preceded by Umberto Grano	European Touring Car Championship; Champion; 1983	Succeeded by Tom Walkinshaw
