= Sauber C8 =

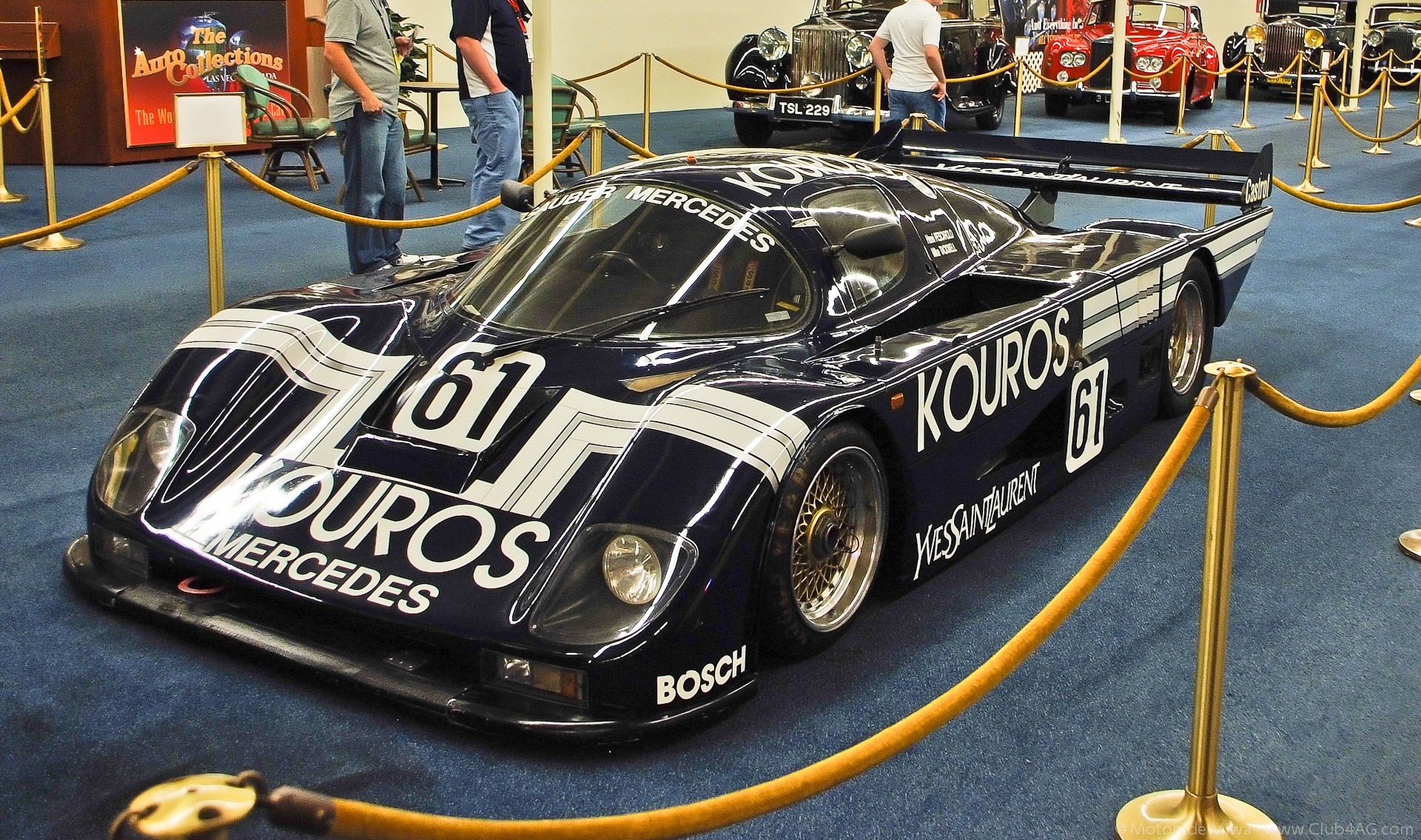
- Category: Group C Prototype
- Constructor: Sauber Motorsport
- Designer(s): Peter Sauber
- Predecessor: Sauber C7
- Successor: Sauber C9

Technical specifications
- Chassis: Light alloy monocoque
- Suspension (front): double wishbones, coil springs over shock absorbers, torsion bar stabilizer
- Suspension (rear): double wishbones, coil springs over shock absorbers, torsion bar stabilizer
- Length: 189 in (480.1 cm)
- Width: 78 in (198.1 cm)
- Height: 42.1 in (106.9 cm)
- Axle track: 63 in (160.0 cm)
- Wheelbase: 106.3 in (270.0 cm)
- Engine: Mercedes-Benz M117 5.0 L Turbo 90° V8 Twin KKK turbos Mid, longitudinally mounted
- Transmission: 5-speed Manual
- Weight: 870 kg (1,918.0 lb)
- Fuel: Bosch Motronic MP 1.2 Fuel Injection
- Tyres: Dunlop, Goodyear

Competition history
- Notable entrants: (Switzerland) Sauber Racing (Switzerland) Kouros Racing Team (France) Noël del Bello
- Notable drivers: (Denmark) John Nielsen (Austria) Dieter Quester (Switzerland) Max Welti (France) Henri Pescarolo (Germany) Christian Danner (New Zealand) Mike Thackwell
- Debut: 1985 24 Hours of Le Mans
Races	Wins	Poles	F/Laps
7	1	0	0
- Teams' Championships: 0
- Constructors' Championships: 0
- Drivers' Championships: 0

The Sauber C8 was a Group C prototype race car introduced in 1985 for the 24 Hours of Le Mans as the first in a partnership between Sauber and Mercedes-Benz.

== Design ==
Mercedes decided not to put forth the money for a full effort on their own until they had time to develop the production-based M117 5.0L Turbocharged V8. Therefore, Mercedes turned to Sauber to create a chassis for them and initially to run the team before Mercedes took on a larger role. Sauber chose to evolve the previous C7 prototype for the C8, although modifications were needed to house the larger V8 instead of the C7's previous Inline-6.

== Racing history ==
In its debut at the 1985 24 Hours of Le Mans, Sauber was able to qualify 17th. However, an accident at the Mulsanne Straight with John Nielsen at the wheel caused enough damage that the car was not able to participate in the race. The team promised to appear at a few more races in the World Sportscar Championship season, but never showed.

For 1986, the team became known as Kouros Racing Team, and the C8 was entered in the full season of the 1986 World Sportscar Championship season. For the first two races the C8 showed promise, with an 8th and a 9th. However, later in the season two C8s were entered in the 1986 24 Hours of Le Mans where neither car finished. For the 1000km of Nürburgring, the team was able to achieve its first victory with drivers Henri Pescarolo and Mike Thackwell, made all the more important by being won in front of the Mercedes-Benz executives in attendance. With this victory the Kouros Racing Team was able to end the season 5th in the teams championship.

In 1987, the Kouros team switched to the newer Sauber C9, while C8 chassis #2 was sold to privateer French team Noël del Bello, which entered the 1987 24 Hours of Le Mans and 1000km of Nürburgring, but failed to finish either race. Noël del Bello continued into 1988, but failed to finish any of the races it entered again.

=== Complete 24 Hours of Le Mans results ===
Year	Class	No.	Team	Drivers	Laps	Pos.	Class Pos.
1985	C1	61	(Switzerland) Sauber Racing	(Denmark) John Nielsen (Austria) Dieter Quester (Switzerland) Max Welti	—	DNS	DNS
1986	C1	61	(Switzerland) Kouros Racing Team	(Denmark) John Nielsen (New Zealand) Mike Thackwell	61	DNF	DNF
1986	C1	62	(Switzerland) Kouros Racing Team	(France) Henri Pescarolo (Germany) Christian Danner (Austria) Dieter Quester	86	DNF	DNF
1987	C1	42	(France) Noël del Bello †	(Switzerland) Pierre-Alain Lombardi (France) Gilles Lempereur (France) Jacques Guillot	4	DNF	DNF
1988	C1	42	(France) Noël del Bello Racing †	(Switzerland) Bernard Santal (France) Noël del Bello (Belgium) Bernard de Dryver	157	DNF	DNF

† Privateer team

== See also ==
- Mercedes-Benz motorsport
