= Sauber C7 =

1983 Group C prototype race car

- Category: Group C Prototype
- Constructor: Sauber Motorsport
- Predecessor: Sauber SHS C6
- Successor: Sauber C8

Technical specifications

Competition history

The Sauber C7 was a Group C prototype race car built by Swiss manufacturer Sauber for competition in the World Sportscar Championship.

Meant to replace Sauber's previous effort, the SHS C6, the C7 would continue Sauber's initial failed development of the BMW M88 3.5L I6 engine in the SHS C6. Debuting at the 1983 24 Hours of Le Mans, the fourth round of the World Sportscar Championship, the Sauber C7 finished an impressive 9th, behind eight Porsche 956s. The C7 would appear again at Fuji, where it would finish 10th overall.

However, development of the C7, of which only one chassis existed, came to a halt after the brief 1983 season. Sauber would begin a brief hiatus from sports car racing, forcing the team to sell their lone C7 chassis to El Salvador outfit Fomfor Racing, who took the car to the United States to participate in the 1984 IMSA Camel GT championship. The team retained the economical BMW M88 motor for the first five races of the season, with a best result of 7th at Road Atlanta before the team dropped out of the championship. They would make one final appearance at the series finale at Daytona, except now using a Chevrolet 6.0L V8 in place of the BMW motor, where the team would finish 11th overall.

Fomfor Racing attempted to continue into 1985, appearing for only two races, in Miami for IMSA where they did not finish and Mosport for the World Sportscar Championship 7th overall. However, the team would fold soon after, thus bringing the C7's career to a quick end after only just over a full season of use. Sauber would return to sportscar development after a year off with their partnership with Mercedes-Benz and the Sauber C8, which carried over a large number of design traits from the C7.
