= Sauber SHS C6 =

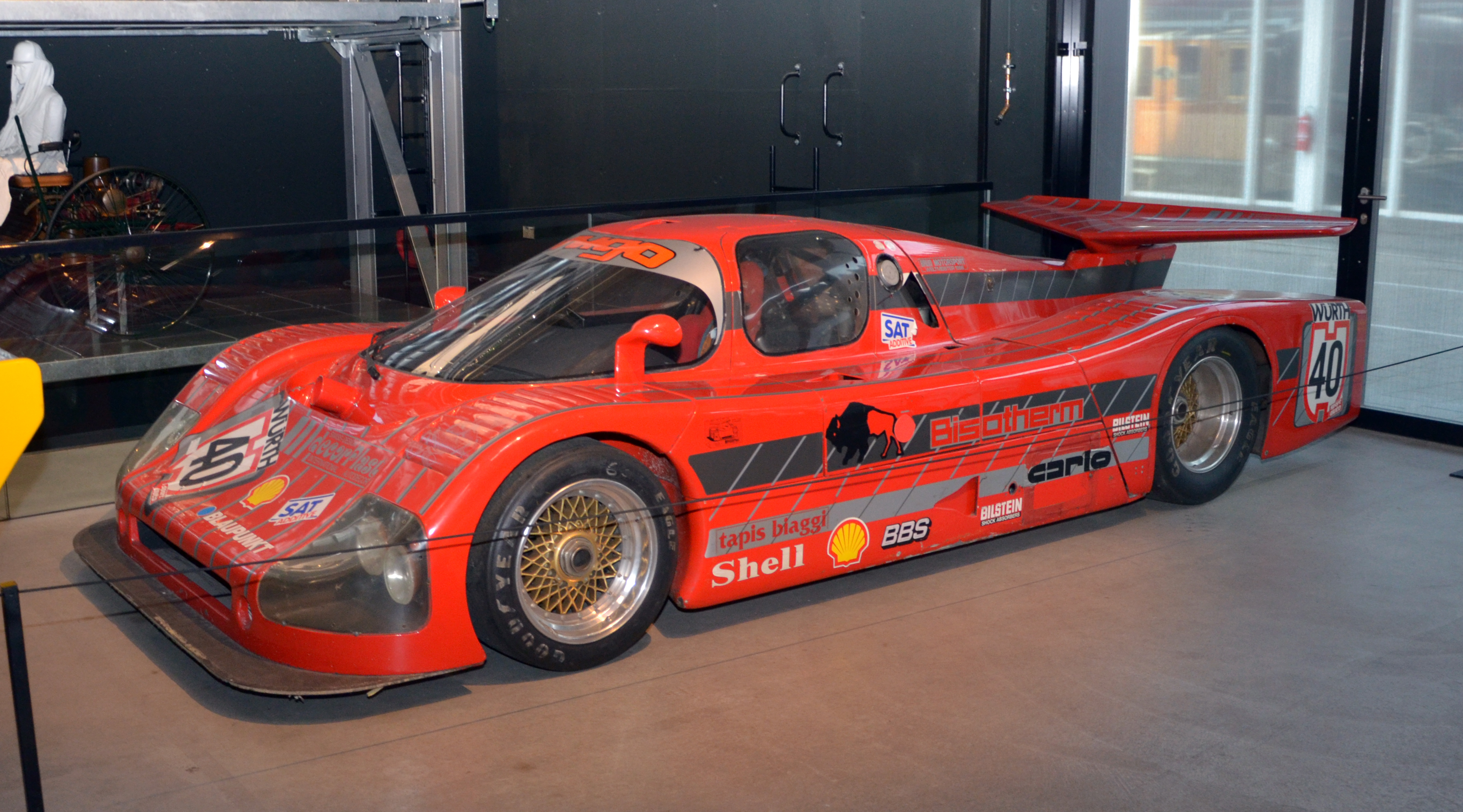
- The Sauber Sehcar C6 at the Swiss Museum of Transport Museum, Lucern
- Category: Group C Prototype, LMP (Note: Rebadged as Alpa LM for 1994 24 Hours of Le Mans season)
- Constructor: Sauber Motorsport
- Predecessor: Sauber C5
- Successor: Sauber C7

Technical specifications

Competition history

The Sauber SHS C6 was a Group C prototype racing car built by Swiss manufacturer Sauber and engineering firm Seger & Hoffman (hence the unique SHS designation), intended for competition in the World Endurance Championship and Deutsche Rennsport Meisterschaft series. Seger & Hoffman left the project later in 1982, leaving the car completely under Sauber's control.

Following Sauber's return to sportscar racing with Group 5 BMW M1s, Peter Sauber decided to return to the top echelon with the creation of a new scratch built sports car in association with Team GS-Sport, who would run the team. Among the more notable features of the SHS C6 was the large "whaletail" rear wing, centrally mounted on the chassis.

== Initial racing history ==
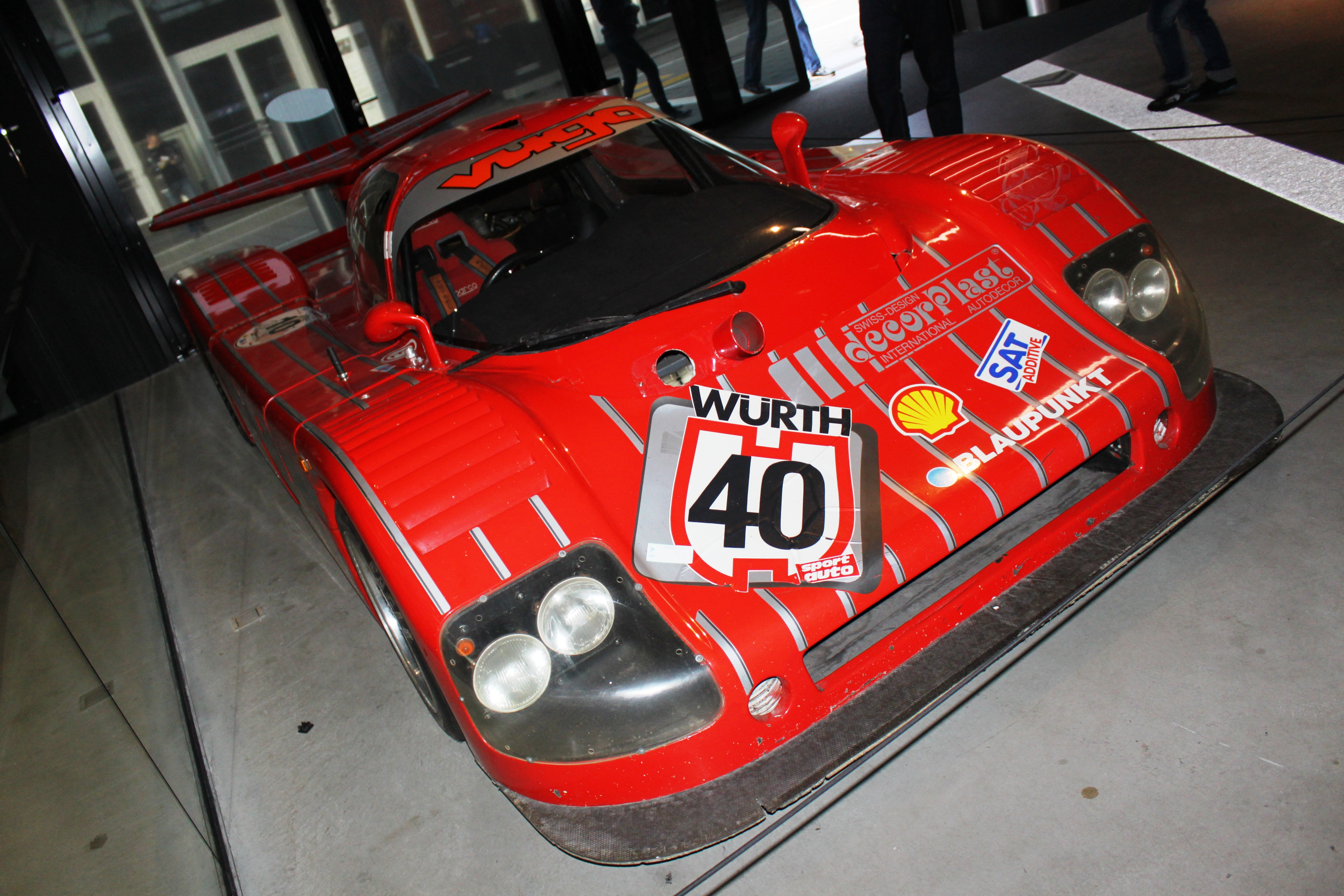

Launched in the 1982 season, the SHS C6 first ran at the World Endurance Championship 1000km Monza where it failed to finish due to fuel pump failure. Following this, the car appeared in its first Deutsche Rennsport Meisterschaft at the Nürburgring, where it again failed to finish due to an accident. Brun and Sauber's luck however would increase as the year went on, with an SHS C6 finishing 13th at Silverstone, earning its first WEC championship points, although its second entry failed to finish. However, for the next few WSC and DRM races, neither SHS C6s would be able to finish, including at the 24 Hours of Le Mans. Following Le Mans though, Brun and Sauber would improve again, as they finished 7th at Norisring, 4th at Hockenheimring, and 8th at Hockenheimring again in DRM, then followed by a 9th at the 1000km Spa and 5th at 1000 km Mugello in WEC. With these results, Sauber managed to finish tied for 5th in the World Endurance Championship for Manufacturers.

With 1982 over, Sauber decided that the SHS C6 needed improvement, and decided to develop a replacement, the Sauber C7, and to use a BMW motor in place of their Ford Cosworth they had used for the bulk of 1982. As they were no longer needed for 1983, the two SHS C6 chassis were retired.

== Sehcar ==
Walter Brun would take over the ailing GS-Sport company and rename it Brun Motorsport for the 1983 season. Brun initially took over GS-Sport's BMW M1s and the Sauber SHS C6, modifying the later into what became known as the Sehcar C6. The Sehcar made its debut at Silverstone, were Brun hired Hans-Joachim Stuck as his co-driver. The race only lasted 32 laps after a gearbox failure. The car was fitted with a BMW engine for the race at the Nürburgring. Stuck qualified the car in a fine seventh position. Early in the race Brun had a dreadful accident on the run up to the Karussel, destroying the car and blocking the track. Brun escaped with minor injury, suffering a broken arm in the accident. The car was refitted with a Cosworth engine for the 24 Hours of Le Mans were the car was driven by the Canadian drivers Villeneuve, Heimrath and Deacon. The raced was a disaster as they retired with an overheated engine before the evening had even fallen. The team also entered a second Sehcar at Le Mans for Brun, Stuck and Harald Grohs. This car was fitted with a Porsche engine but did not start the race as the car was not prepared properly.

The Sehcar Porsche returned at the 1984 1000 km of Monza were the car was driven by Clemens Schikentanz and Huub Rothengatter. After an engine failure the car once again did not start the race. At Silverstone Schikentanz and Rothengatter finished in 15th position, which was the first finish for the Sehcar in a World Sportscar Championship race. At Spa-Francorchamps the car was driven by Didier Theys, Boy Hayje and Pierre Dieudonné. After another engine failure the team did not start the race. Theys and Dieudonné returned at Imola were a crash ended their race after 99 laps. This was the last appearance of the Sehcar at a World Sportscar Championship event.

== Return to racing ==
In 1983, the FIA split the Group C category into two classes, with the lower class designated Group C Junior and intended for less wealthy private teams. For the 1985 season, French racer Roland Bassaler, needing a cheap chassis for competition in the class (which was now designated as Group C Junior), decided to buy an SHS C6 and install a BMW M88 3.5L I6. Debuting at the 24 Hours of Le Mans, the car finished a distant 23rd. The only other finish for the year was a 17th at the 1000km Spa, leaving the teams with no points in the 1985 championship.

Roland Bassaler would continue into 1986, again starting at Le Mans where he failed to finish, then followed by a 17th-place finish at Brands Hatch. Roland Bassaler would then score their only points at the Nürburgring with a 12th-place finish, in an event which was actually won by a Sauber C8. After the 1986 season, Roland Bassaler would stop participating in the World Championship, but continued to race in the 24 Hours of Le Mans until 1988, scoring no finishes in the two attempts.

== Returning again ==
Roland Bassaler would again bring his SHS C6 chassis out of retirement for a second time in 1993, again to participate in the C2 class at the 24 Hours of Le Mans. The car was still outfitted with a 3.5L BMW I6, although the bodywork was radically different from how the SHS C6 had started life in 1982. The car would not finish due to an accident. In 1993, the Group C was cancelled, however, this car was last time entered by Roland Bassaler in the 24 Hours of Le Mans in 1994. The car, entered in the top LMP1/C90 class (including ex-Group C cars), was fitted with a 3.5L Ford Cosworth engine (the same as in 1982-1984), rebadged as Alpa LM (however, it was actually the same as 1993, except for the engine) and painted blue instead of red. The car retired after a suspension accident on the 64th lap. In 1995, the car did not participate due to the final cancellation of Group C cars at Le Mans. In fact, the car was the oldest car to ever participate at the 24 Hours of Le Mans at the end of competition story.
