= Max Welti =

Swiss racing driver

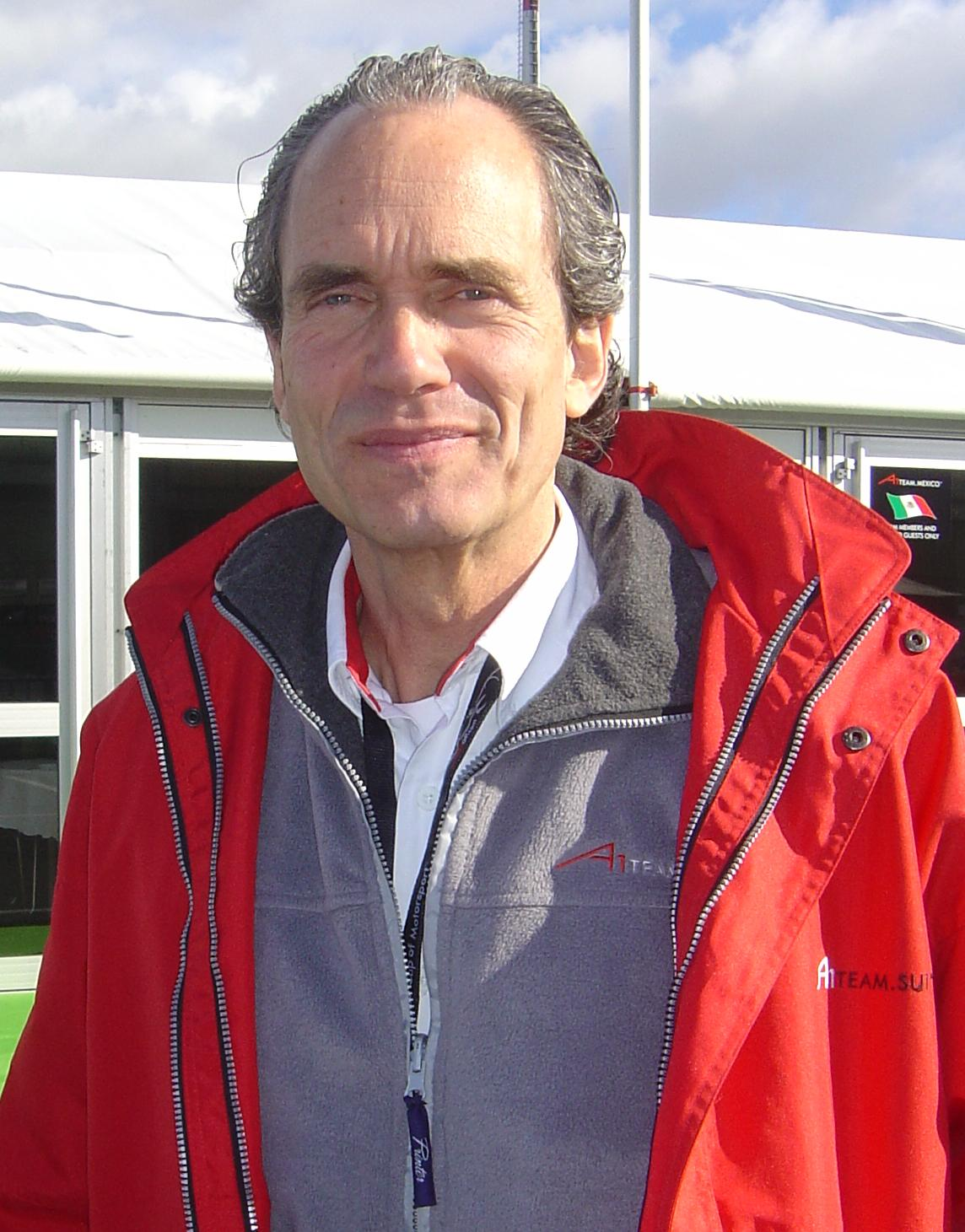
Welti in 2007

Max Welti (born 6 September 1952 in Zürich, Switzerland) is a former Swiss racing driver, Sauber's first team manager and thus double winner of the 24 Hours of Le Mans as well as two-time sports car world champion with Sauber Mercedes. Five years later, he wins the 24 Hours of Le Mans for a second time with Porsche as the responsible race director. He then returns to Sauber as overall manager of the Sauber Formula One operation. In 2000 Welti becomes CEO of the European silhouette touring car racing series "V8STAR" before becoming team owner of A1 A1 Team Switzerland in 2005. As an international motorsport strategist and consultant, Welti nowadays works for OEMs, promoters and organisers.

== Career ==
=== 1975-1990: From active Racing Driver to Team Manager, Le Mans Winner and World Champion ===
Welti studied mechanical engineering at EPFL, and ETH Zurich while he began racing.

He raced for three years in the Swiss Sports Prototype Championship, which he won in 1980 on a Wittwer March BMW.

After his active racing days, Welti moves into operational racing and becomes Sauber's first Team Manager. He helps the team become one of the most successful in Sports car racing.

In 1986, Mike Thackwell and Henri Pescarolo gave the Sauber-Mercedes team its first win at Nürburgring 1000 km. Two years later, with backing from the German electrical giant AEG, the Swiss team battles Jaguar for the World Sportscar title. Mercedes-Benz officially returns to racing and the Sport Prototypes are painted silver again in 1989, for the first time since 1956. Jean-Louis Schlesser wins the Drivers' World title that year. The team dominates the Constructors' title, winning seven of a total of eight races. In the Le Mans 24 Hours the team scored a 1–2 victory with "the new Silver Arrows" driven by Jochen Mass/Manuel Reuter/Stanley Dickens, with Mauro Baldi/Kenny Acheson/Gianfranco Brancatelli finishing in second place. In 1990, Schlesser and Baldi shares the Drivers' title while Mass drives alternately with the three Mercedes Juniors: Michael Schumacher, Karl Wendlinger and Heinz-Harald Frentzen. The team wins the Constructors' title for a second time in 1990.

=== 1991-1994: Race Director ===
In 1991, Sportscar Racing went into decline and Welti was offered the job of being F1 Project Manager for Porsche Motorsport, in a new relationship with the Footwork team. The Porsche engine was, however, a disaster and as a result Welti pulled the team out of F1. As Porsche Motorsport Director worldwide, he was responsible for the complete reorganization of the motorsport department. In 1993, Welti launched the Porsche Supercup and himself led the negotiations with F1 Boss Bernie Ecclestone as it was to take place as an international one-make cup and support series in Formula One. In 1994, once again, Welti celebrated with Porsche and his team another triumph with the modified version of the 962 at the 24 Hours of Le Mans driven by Mauro Baldi/Hurley Haywood/Yannick Dalmas. With Max Welti as racing director and racing engineer Norbert Singer as project leader, two racing cars and one reserve car were developed, built and tested in record time and brought to the Le Mans race.

=== 1995: Vice President of Sauber Formula 1 ===
In May 1995 Welti decided to return to Sauber as team director of the new Formula 1 team. He was particularly instrumental in establishing a new and more efficient structural team organisation and building up an especially tight relationship with its Malaysian sponsor Petronas as well as with its engine manufacturer Ferrari as of 1997.. Furthermore, he led the team to its first podium finish.

=== 2000-2003: V8STAR - Setting up Europeans 1st Silhouette touring car championship ===
From 2000, Welti was responsible as chief executive officer for setting up the V8STAR touring car series in Germany, a championship for tubular frame vehicles with silhouettes of well-known manufacturers such as Jaguar, Volkswagen, Opel, Ford, Lexus, Audi and BMW with uniform V8 engines under the hood and renowned pilots at the steering wheel.

=== 2005-2009: Team Principal Swiss National Team - A1 GP Worldcup of Motorsport ===
In 2004, Welti became Franchisee and Team Principal in the A1 GP Worldcup of Motorsport and built up the Swiss national motorsport team. With Neel Jani, the A1 Team Switzerland won the World Cup of Motorsport in 2008 and was runner-up in 2006 and 2009. The team also supported other Swiss drivers such as Marcel Fässler, Sébastian Buemi, Alexandre Imperatori, Tom Dillmann, Rahel Frey and Natacha Gachnang. No other team nor driver were more successful than Switzerland and Jani in this global championship.

=== 2013-2017: Volkswagen Group ===
Welti entered the international limelight again in 2013. As member of the Volkswagen Group Motorsprt Steering Committee, he was sent to Italy as Motorsport Director of Lamborghini Squadra Corse to build up a new motorsport department there. After that task was completed, Welti traveled to all important races in Europe and on the American continent for six years, leading negotiations with organizers, promoters, federations and technicians of different racing series.

=== 2018-2023: BMW Group ===
Between 2018 and 2020 Welti is a strategic motorsport advisor to BMW. He travels to important races of the WEC, IMSA, Formula E, DTM as well as WRX and is on site at endurance classics such as Nürburgring, Spa, Le Mans, Sebring and Daytona.

=== 2009 until today: Consultant for racing series, promoters, sponsors and OEMs ===
Nowadays, Welti works internationally as an independent expert for promoters, sponsors and OEMs. Since 2019, he is also the Sporting Director of the all-electric SuperCharge racing series.

== Awards ==
In 1990, Max Welti is awarded the "BP Racing Trophy", an award for special services to motorsport, which he receives for his successes with Sauber-Mercedes. The coveted "BP Racing Trophy" was first awarded in 1965.

After winning the world championship title in the A1GP season 2007/2008, A1 Team Switzerland receives in December 2008 the Auto Sport Award for special services to Swiss motorsport. Previous award winners were motorsport greats like Jo Siffert, Clay Regazzoni und Peter Sauber.

In 2010, Max Welti is inducted into the "Wall of Fame" in the Autobau museum in Romanshorn as "Swiss legend of motor racing".
