= List of Group C sports cars =

The following are a list of cars which raced under the Group C formula. Some chassis may have raced in multiple Group C classes through its lifetime, though only the primary class it participated in is listed.

Brand	Chassis	Image	Year	Applications	Notes	Source
ADA	01		1984	C2	Rebadged 1982 de Cadenet-Lola LM	
ADA	03		1988	C2	March chassis	
ADA	02B		1989	C2	Gebhardt chassis	
Alba	AR2		1983	C Jr, C2		
Alba	AR3		1984	C2		
Alba	AR4		1985	C2	AR3 chassis rebuild for IMSA GTP Lights	
Alba	AR5		1985	C2		
Alba	AR6		1986	C2		
Alba	AR8		1986	C2		
Alba	AR9		1989	C2		
Alba	AR20		1990	C		
ALD	01		1985	C2		
ALD	02		1986	C2		
ALD	03		1987	C2		
ALD	04		1988	C2		
ALD	05		1989	C2		
ALD	06		1989	C2		
ALD	C289		1989	C2		
ALD	C91		1991	C2		
Alfa Romeo	SE048SP		1990	C1	Never saw competition	
Allard	J2X-C		1992	C2		
Argo	JM19		1986	C2		
Argo	JM19B		1987	C2		
Argo	JM19C		1988	C1		
Arundel	C200		1984	C2	Later rebuilt to Barbon DB1.	
Aston Martin	AMR1		1989	C1		
Bardon	DB1		1986	C2		
Bardon	DB2 or DB1/2		1987	C2		
BMW	GTP		1986	C1	Based on the March 86G, primarily raced in IMSA	
Brabham	BRC-1		1982	C2	Brabham BT29 Can-Am car fitted with a roof for one DRM race	
British Barn	BB90R		1989	C2	Rebadged Toyota 87C with a Cosworth DFZ	
BRM	P351		1992	C1		
Brun Motorsport	C91		1991	C1		
Ceekar	83J		1988	C2		
Cheek	C288		1994	C2		
Cheetah	G603		1983	C1		
Cheetah	G604		1984	C1		
Chevron	B36		1986	C	Privately modified Group 6 car with Sthemo body	
Chevron	B62		1986	C2		
Cougar	C01		1982	C		
Cougar	C01B		1983	C		
Cougar	C02		1984	C1		
Cougar	C12		1985	C1, C2		
Cougar	C20		1987	C1		
Cougar	C20B		1988	C1, C2		
Cougar	C22		1988	C1		
Cougar	C22LM		1989	C1		
Cougar	C20S		1990	C2		
Cougar	C24S		1990	C1		
Cougar	C26S		1991	C2		
Cougar	C28LM		1992	C3		
Cougar	C30LM		1993	C2	Run under Courage nameplate	
Dahmen	DC884		1984	C1		
de Cadenet-Lola	LM		1982	C, C Jr	Based on a Lola T390 chassis.	
Dome	RL80		1980	C1		
Dome	RL81		1981	C1		
Dome	RC82		1982	C, C1	Chassis developed by March Engineering	
Dome	RC83		1983	C1	Chassis developed by Dome	
Dome	85C		1985	C1		
Dome	86C		1986	C1		
Dome	87C		1987	C1		
Eagle Performance	700		1990	C1	Modified Corvette GTP that previously saw action in IMSA with a marine engine, chassis from a Corvette GTP	
Ecosse	C284		1984	C2	Modified de Cadenet-Lola Gr.6 with new bodywork, developed by Ray Mallock	
Ecosse	C285		1985	C2		
Ecosse	C286		1986	C2		
EMKA	C83/1		1983	C		
EMKA	C84/1		1985	C1		
Ford	C100		1982	C	Chassis built by John Thompson's TC Prototypes.	
Gebhardt	JC843		1985	C2		
Gebhardt	JC853		1985	C2		
Gebhardt	C88		1988	C2		
Gebhardt	C91		1992	C2		
GKW	862 SP		1986	C2	Never saw competition, modified Porsche 962	
Grid	S1		1982	C		
Grid	S2		1984	C1		
Harrier	RX-83C		1983	C Jr		
Harrier	LR4		1984	C2		
Harrier	LR5		1987	C2		
Harrier	LR6		1988	C2		
Harrier	LR7		1989	C2		
Jaguar	XJR-6		1986	C1		
Jaguar	XJR-8		1987	C1		
Jaguar	XJR-9		1988	C1		
Jaguar	XJR-11		1990	C1		
Jaguar	XJR-12		1990	C1		
Jaguar	XJR-14		1991	C1		
Jaguar	XJR-17		1992	C1		
Jiro	JTK 62C		1987	C2	Modified Dome 86C	
Joest	936C		1982	C1	Coupe version of the Porsche 936	
Konrad	KM-011		1991	C1		
Kremer	CK5		1982	C, C1	Modified Porsche 936	
Lamborghini	Countach QVX		1985	C	Built on a Tiga GC84. Chassis developed by Spice Engineering	
Lancia	LC1 Coupé		1983	C	Cars modified by Sivama Motors to meet Group C regulations	
Lancia	LC2		1983	C, C1		
Team LeMans	LM03C		1983		AKA Nissan Fairlady Z Turbo C	
Team LeMans	LM04C		1984		AKA Nissan Skyline Turbo C	
Team LeMans	LM05C		1985			
Team LeMans	LM06C		1986			
Team LeMans	LM07C		1987			
Lola	T610		1982	C, C1		
Lola	T616		1984	C2		
Lola	T92/10		1992	C1		
Lotec	M1C		1982	C		
Lotec	C302		1985	C2		
Lotec	C190		1990	C2		
Lyncar	MS83		1983	C2		
March	82G		1982	C		
March	83G		1983	C1	AKA Nissan Silvia Turbo C	
March	85G		1985	C1	AKA Nissan Skyline Turbo C	
March	86G		1986	C1		
March	87G		1987	C1		
March	88G		1987	C1		
March	88S		1988	C1		
Maurer	C87		1987	C2		
Mazda	717C		1983	C Jr		
Mazda	727C		1984	C2		
Mazda	737C		1985	C2		
Mazda	757		1987	C2		
Mazda	767		1988	C2		
Mazda	767B		1989	C2		
Mazda	787		1990	C1		
Mazda	787B		1991	C1		
Mazda	MXR-01		1992	C1	Modified Jaguar XJR-14	
McLaren	C8		1982	C	Modified McLaren M8F	
Mercedes-Benz	C11		1991	C2	Chassis developed by Sauber	
Mercedes-Benz	C291		1991	C1		
Mercedes-Benz	C292		1991	C1		
Mirage	M12		1982	C1		
Mooncraft	MCS Guppy		1983	C2		
Mussato	MXJ-92		1992	C2	Never saw competition	
Nimrod	NRA/C2		1982	C		
Nimrod	NRA/C2B		1983	C, C1		
Nissan	Skyline Turbo C		1983	C1	Chassis developed by Tokyo R&D, front engined, based on the Group 5 Skyline RS Silhouette Formula.	
Nissan	Fairlady Z		1985	C1	Rebranded Lola T810	
Nissan	R85V		1985	C1	Chassis developed by March Engineering	
Nissan	R86V		1986	C1	Chassis developed by March Engineering. Converted to a Nissan R88C and March 88S throughout its lifespan.	
Nissan	R87E		1987	C1	Chassis developed by March Engineering	
Nissan	R88C		1988	C1	Chassis developed by March Engineering	
Nissan	R89C		1989	C1	Chassis developed by Lola Cars as T89/10	
Nissan	R90CP		1990	C1	Chassis developed by Lola Cars as T90/10	
Nissan	R90CK		1990	C1	Chassis developed by Lola Cars as T90/10	
Nissan	R91CP		1991	C1	Chassis developed by Lola Cars as T91/10	
Nissan	R91CK		1991	C1	Updated Nissan R90CK	
Nissan	R92CP		1992	C1	Updated Nissan R91CP	
Nissan	P35		1992	C1	Developed by NPTI, never saw competition	
Norma	M6		1990	C1		
Nykjær			1985	C2		
Olmas	GLT-200		1988		C2	
Peugeot	905		1991	C1		
Peugeot	905B Evo		1992	C1		
Porsche	936C		1982	C	Privately modified by Joest Racing as all factory built 936 were Gr. 6 cars	
Porsche	956		1982	C, C1		
Porsche	956B		1984	C1		
Porsche	962C		1985	C1		
Porsche	962 GTi		1985	C1	Constructed privately by Richard Lloyd Racing	
Porsche	962 CK6		1985	C1	Constructed privately by Kremer Racing	
Rieger	CJ 84		1984	C2		
ROC	002		1991	C1		
Rondeau	M379C		1982	C, C2		
Rondeau	M382		1982	C, C1		
Rondeau	M482		1983	C, C1		
Royale	RP40		1987	C2		
SARD	MC86X		1986			
Sauber	SHS C6		1982	C, C2		
Sauber	C7		1983	C		
Sauber	C8		1985	C1		
Sauber	C9		1987	C1		
Sehcar	C6		1983	C	Modified Sauber SHS C6	
Sehcar	C830		1983	C, C1	Chassis based on a Ford C100	
Simpson	C286		1986	C2		
Spice	SE86C		1986	C2		
Spice	SE87C		1988	C2		
Spice	SE88C		1988	C2		
Spice	SE89C		1989	C1, C2		
Spice	SE90C		1990	C1		
Sthemo	SM01		1983	C Jr		
Sthemo	SMC2		1984	C2		
Strandell	85		1985	C2		
Stürtz	SM C288		1988	C1		
Tiga	GC284		1984	C2		
Tiga	GC285		1985	C2		
Tiga	GC286		1986	C2		
Tiga	GC287		1987	C2		
Tiga	GC288		1988	C1		
Tiga	GC289		1989	C2		
TOJ	C390		1982	C, C1		
TOM'S	Celica C		1982	C	First group C car by TOM'S	
TOM'S	82C		1983	C		
TOM'S	83C		1983	C		
TOM'S	84C		1984	C1	Designed by Dome and built by TOM'S	
TOM'S	85C		1985	C1	Designed by Dome and built by TOM'S	
TOM'S	86C		1986	C1	Designed by Dome and built by Tom's	
Toyota	87C		1987	C1		
Toyota	88C		1988	C1	Designed by Dome and built by TRD	
Toyota	88C-V		1988	C1	Designed by Dome and built by TRD	
Toyota	89C-V		1989	C1		
Toyota	90C-V		1990	C1	Designed and built by TRD	
Toyota	91C-V		1991	C1		
Toyota	92C-V		1992	C2		
Toyota	TS010		1992	C1		
Toyota	93C-V		1993	C2	Updated Toyota 92C-V	
URD	C81		1982	C, C2		
URD	C83		1983	C		
Veskanda	C1		1985	C1	Built by K&A Engineering, the only Australian designed and built Group C car. Powered by a 6.0L Chevrolet V8.	
WM	P82		1982	C		
WM	P83		1983	C		
WM	P83B		1984	C1		
WM	P86		1986	C1		
WM	P87		1987	C1		
WM	P88		1988	C1		
WM	P489		1989	C1		
Zakspeed	C1/4		1983	C	Modified Ford C100	
Zakspeed	C1/8		1983	C, C1	Modified Ford C100	
