= Jean-François Yvon =

French racing driver (born 1958)

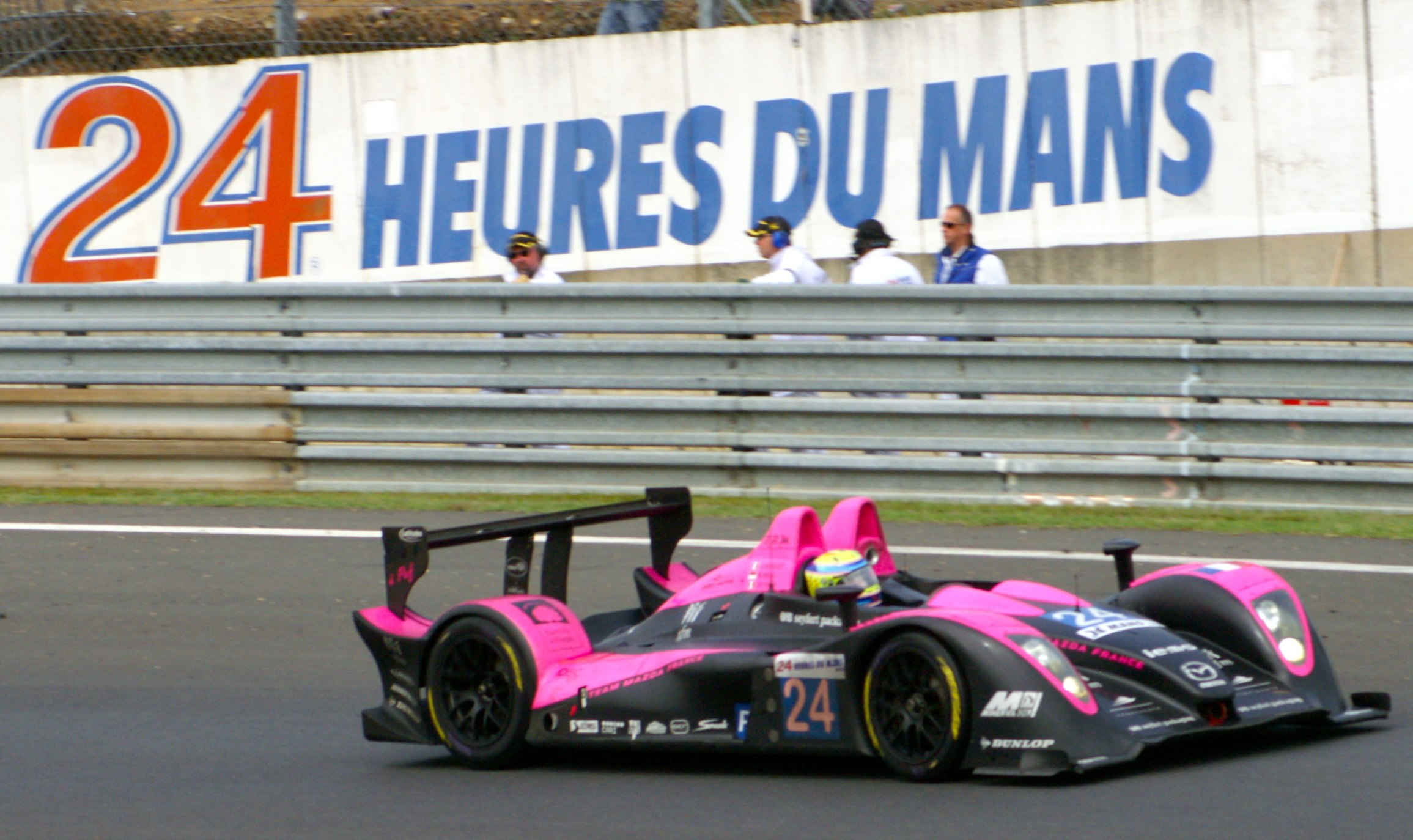
- Yvon racing for OAK in 2010.
- Nationality: (France) French
- Born: 24 November 1958 (age 67) Le Mans, France
- Categorisation: FIA Silver (until 2013); FIA Bronze (2014–)

Jean-François Yvon (born 24 November 1958) is a French racing driver.

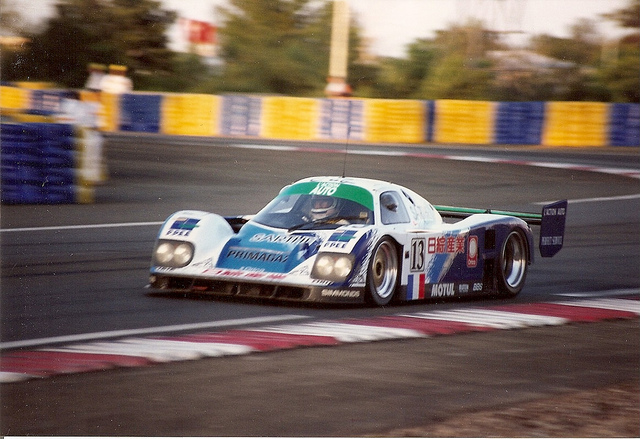
Yvon aboard his Courage at the 1993 Le Mans 24 Hours.

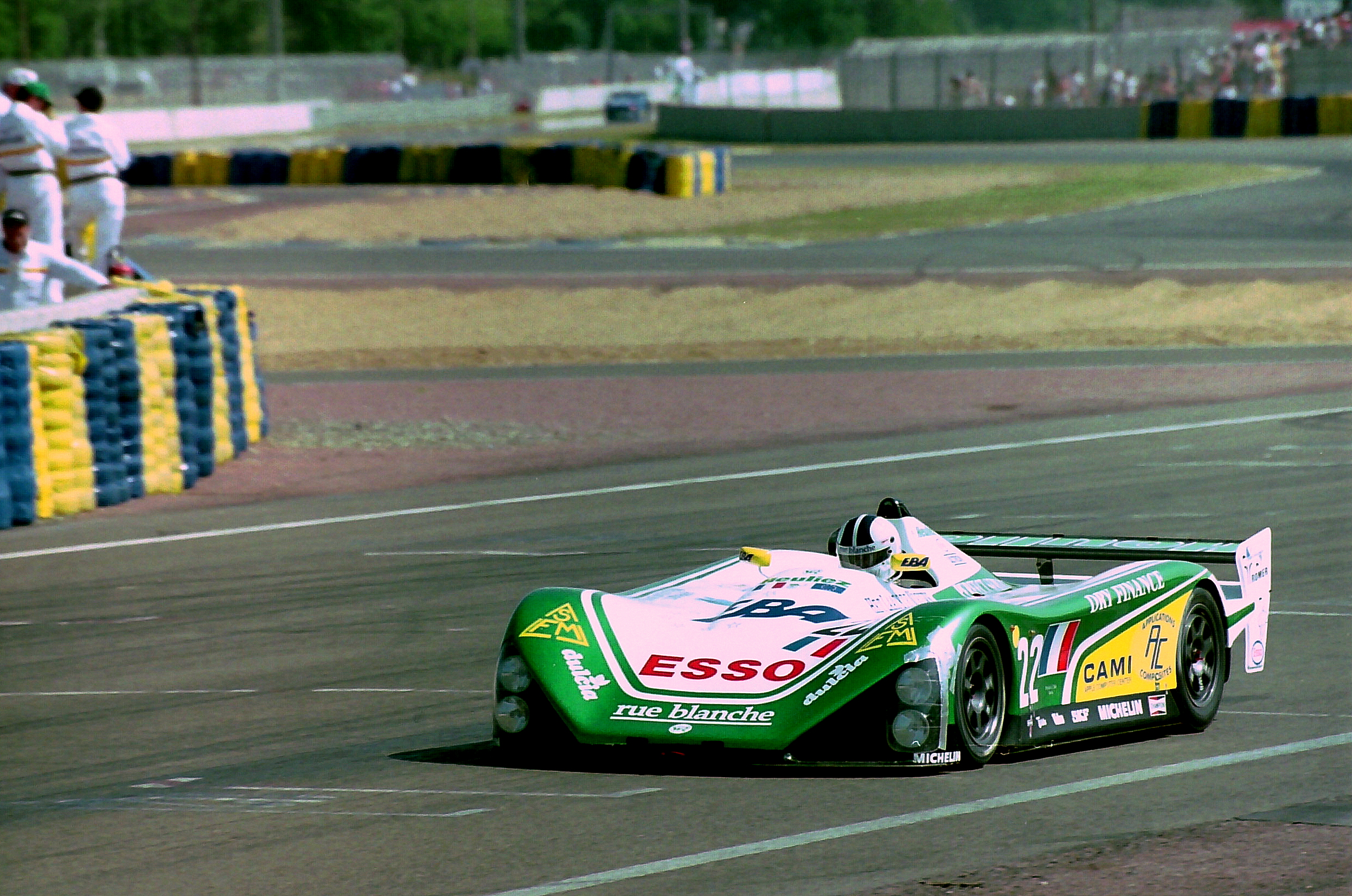
Yvon's Welter Racing machine in 1994.

== Racing record ==
=== 24 Hours of Le Mans results ===
Year	Team	Co-Drivers	Car	Class	Laps	Pos.	Class Pos.
1984	(Germany) Helmut Gall	(France) Philippe Dagoreau (France) Pierre de Thoisy	BMW M1	B	292	14th	1st
1985	(France) Primagaz	(France) Yves Courage (United Kingdom) Alain de Cadenet	Cougar C12-Porsche	C1	279	20th	15th
1986	(Germany) Gebhardt Motorsport	(Sweden) Stanley Dickens (France) Pierre de Thoisy	Gebhardt JC853-Ford Cosworth	C1	68	DNF	DNF
1987	(France) Roland Bassaler	(France) Yves Hervalet (France) Hervé Bourjade	Sauber SHS C6-BMW	C2	257	DNF	DNF
1988	(France) Roland Bassaler	(France) Roland Bassaler (France) Remy Pochauvin	Sauber SHS C6-BMW	C2	53	DNF	DNF
1992	(France) Courage Compétition	(Spain) Tomás Saldaña (France) Denis Morin	Courage C28LM-Porsche	C3	142	DNF	DNF
1993	(France) Courage Compétition	(France) Jean-Louis Ricci (France) Pierre Yver	Courage C30LM-Porsche	C2	343	11th	6th
1994	(France) Welter Racing	(Belgium) Hervé Regout (France) Jean-Paul Libert	WR LM93-Peugeot	LMP2	86	DNF	DNF
2000	(France) Didier Bonnet Racing	(France) Patrick Lemarié (France) Yann Goudy	Debora LMP2000-BMW	LMP675	24	DNF	DNF
2009	OAK Racing; Team Mazda France	(Monaco) Richard Hein (France) Jacques Nicolet	Pescarolo 01-Mazda	LMP2	325	20th	3rd
2010	(France) OAK Racing	(Monaco) Richard Hein (France) Jacques Nicolet	Pescarolo 01-Judd	LMP2	341	9th	4th
2011	(France) OAK Racing	(Monaco) Richard Hein (France) Jacques Nicolet	OAK Pescarolo 01 Evo-Judd	LMP1	119	DNF	DNF
