= Alfa Romeo Tipo 1035 =

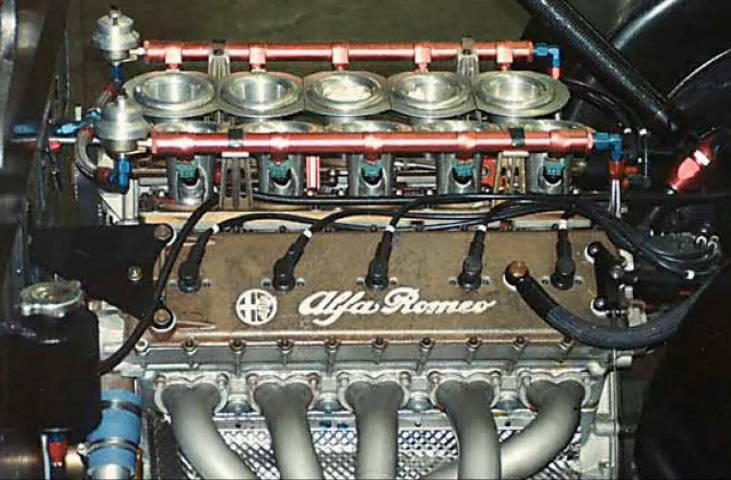

Overview
- Manufacturer: Alfa Lancia Industriale
- Production: 1987–1988

Layout
- Configuration: 72° V10
- Displacement: 3.5 L (3,498 cc)
- Cylinder bore: 88 mm (3.5 in)
- Piston stroke: 57.52 mm (2.265 in)
- Valvetrain: 40-valve, DOHC, four-valves per cylinder 50-valve, DOHC, five-valves per cylinder
- Compression ratio: 12.5:1

Combustion
- Fuel system: Electronic fuel injection
- Fuel type: Gasoline
- Oil system: Dry sump

Output
- Power output: 580–620 hp (433–462 kW)
- Torque output: 250–280 lb⋅ft (339–380 N⋅m)

The Alfa Romeo Tipo 1035 is a naturally-aspirated, 3.5-liter, V10 racing engine, designed and built by Alfa Romeo. It was originally specially designed for the Ligier Formula One team, but was later used in the experimental Alfa Romeo 164 Procar touring car, and the Alfa Romeo SE 048SP Group C sports prototype race car.

== Engine design ==
In 1990, the Group C regulations underwent a major revamp, with the primary focus being on changing the engines to 3.5-litre units sourced from Formula One cars.

The project itself was a well-kept secret, and very little was ever revealed about the car's specifications. One thing that Alfa Romeo did reveal was that it used the 3.5-litre Tipo 1035 V10 engine from the still-born Alfa Romeo 164 Procar; this was a naturally aspirated 72 degree V10 originally designed for the Ligier Formula One team, and produced a claimed output of 620 hp (462 kW; 629 PS) at 13,300 RPM.

== Applications ==
- Alfa Romeo 164 Procar
- Alfa Romeo SE 048SP
