= Tomás Saldaña =

Spanish racing driver

Tomás Saldaria
- Nationality: Spanish
- Born: 23 March 1961 Bilbao, Vizcaya

Tomás Saldaña (born 23 March 1961) is a Spanish former racing driver.

- 24 Hours of Le Mans in 1992, 1993, 1994, 1995, 1997, 1999, 2000.
- 1985 FF Spanish Championship – Vice Champion
- 1986 R5 I Spanish Championship – Third
- 1988 R5Turbo Spanish Championship – Champion
- 1993 Interserie Sportscar Championship – Vice Champion. 2002 Iberian and Spanish GT Championship – Vicechampion.

== Complete 24 Hours of Le Mans results ==
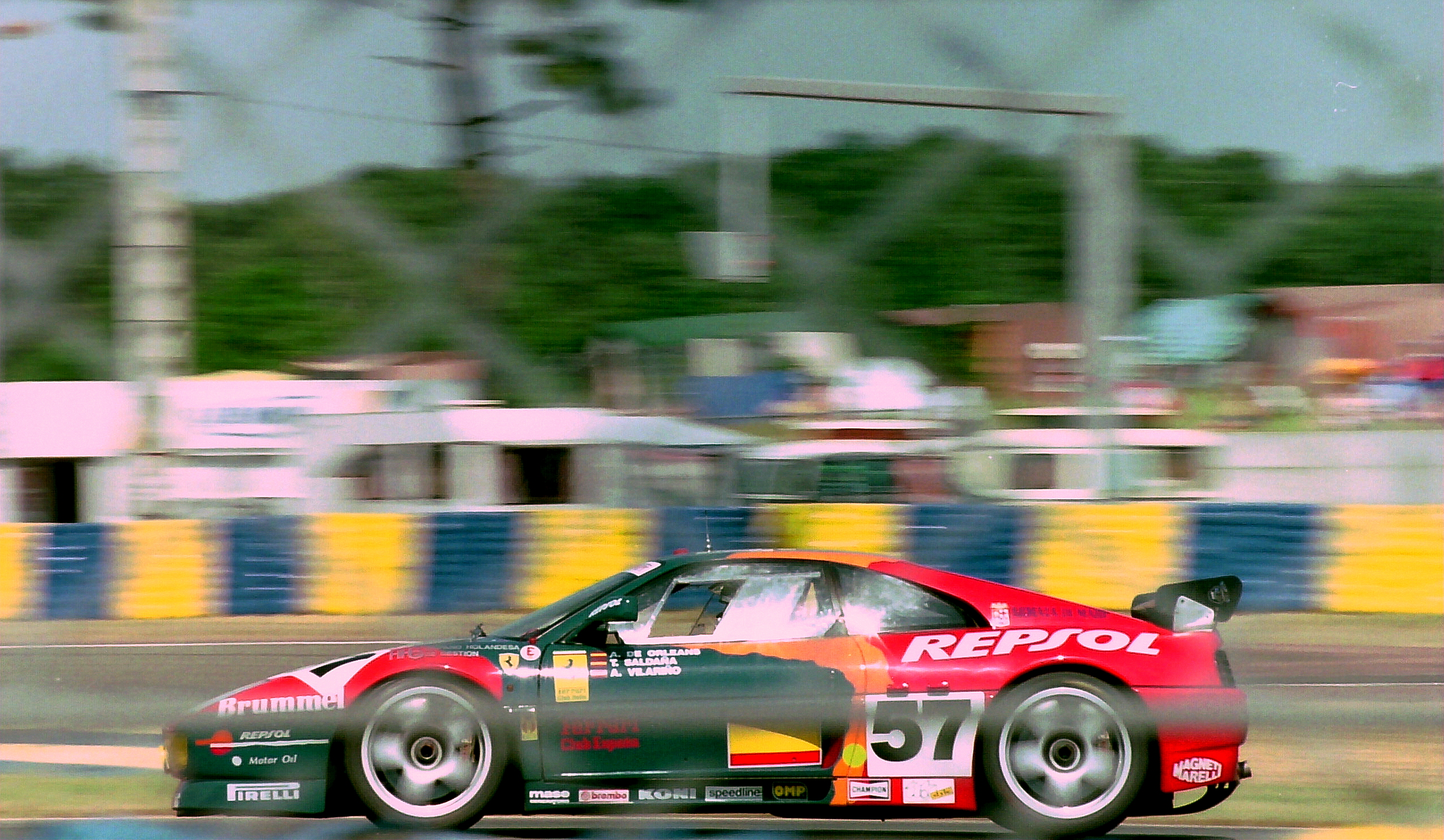
Ferrari 348 GTC-LM - Tomas Saldaria, Alfonso de Orleans & Andres Vilarino at the 1994 Le Mans

Year	Team	Co-drivers	Car	Class	Laps	Pos.	Class pos.
1992	(France) Courage Compétition	(France) Denis Morin (France) Jean-François Yvon	Cougar C28LM	Gr. C3	142	DNF	DNF
1993	(Germany) Porsche Kremer Racing	(United States) Andy Evans (France) François Migault	Porsche 962CK6	Gr. C2	316	13th	8th
1994	(Spain) Repsol Ferrari España	(Spain) Alfonso de Orleans (Spain) Andrés Vilariño	Ferrari 348 GTC-LM	LMGT2	276	11th	4th
1995	(Germany) Heico Motorsport	(Spain) Miguel Ángel de Castro (Spain) Alfonso de Orleans	Porsche 911 GT2	LMGT2	63	DNF	DNF
1997	(Germany) Kremer Racing	(Sweden) Carl Rosenblad (Germany) Jürgen Lässig	Kremer K8 Spyder	LMP	103	DNF	DNF
1999	(Germany) Kremer Racing	(South Africa) Grant Orbell (Belgium) Didier de Radiguès	Lola B98/10	LMP	146	DNF	DNF
2000	(Spain) Racing Engineering	(Spain) Jesús Díez Villaroel (Italy) Giovanni Lavaggi	Porsche 911 GT3	LMGT	78	DNF	DNF
