= Cougar C02 =

The Cougar C02 was a Group C sports car prototype race car, designed, developed, and built by French constructor Cougar in 1983, and used in sports car racing from 1983 to 1984. It was the successor the C01. Its best result was at the 1984 500 km of Watkins Glen, where drivers Yves Courage and John Jellinek, and Alain de Cadenet finished in 9th-place, respectively.

== Development history and technology ==
The Cougar C02 is a closed Group C prototype, was developed and built by Yves Courage in 1985 and prepared for the respective races by his own racing team, Cougar. Powered by a Formula One-derived 3.3 L (200 cu in) naturally aspirated Ford-Cosworth DFL V8 engine, producing a respectable 493 hp (368 kW) @ 9,500 rpm. This drives the rear wheels through a 5-speed manual transmission. The whole car weighed 875 kg (1,929 lb). This allowed it to reach a top speed of 205 mph (330 km/h).
