= Mercedes-Benz M291 engine =

Mercedes-Benz M291

Overview
- Manufacturer: (Germany) Mercedes-Benz
- Production: 1991–1992

Layout
- Configuration: 180° Flat 12 engine
- Displacement: 3.5 L (214 cu in)
- Cylinder bore: 86 mm (3.4 in)
- Piston stroke: 50.1 mm (1.97 in)
- Valvetrain: 48-valve, DOHC, four-valves per cylinder

Combustion
- Fuel system: Fuel injection
- Oil system: Dry sump

Output
- Power output: 550–718 hp (410–535 kW)
- Torque output: 400 N⋅m (300 lb⋅ft)

The Mercedes-Benz M291 engine is a 3.5-liter flat-12 racing engine, designed, developed and produced by Mercedes-Benz, for their Group C racing program. It was introduced in 1991, along with their new Mercedes-Benz C291 prototype race car chassis.

== Background ==
The 1991 season marked the introduction of the FIA’s new, and controversial, 3.5-liter formula which replaced the highly successful Group C category that had been used in the World Sportscar Championship since 1982, though due to a small number of entries for the 3.5-liter formula heavily penalized Group C cars (which were subject to weight penalties and started behind the new-style C1 entries on the grid) were allowed to participate in the season's C2 category.

== Engine ==
The primary feature of the new regulations was the use of a 3.5-liter naturally aspirated engine. This made it impossible for Mercedes-Benz to use the engines from its previous Group C cars. Also, to produce similar power to the Group C cars a 3.5-liter naturally aspirated engine had to be very high-revving and be constructed from different materials in order to rev highly.

As Jaguar was part of Ford since 1990, the XJR-14 could use the proven Ford-Cosworth HB engine from the Benetton B190B Formula One car (the engine regulations for the new 3.5-liter formula were identical to Formula One). Mercedes-Benz had to design an all-new purpose-built racing engine and its M-291 3.5 L Flat-12 unit was the result. The engine only produced about 550–600 brake horsepower (410–450 kW), compared to over 730 brake horsepower (540 kW) produced by M119 5.0-liter V8 twin-turbo found in the C291's predecessor, the Sauber-Mercedes C11.

== Applications ==
- Mercedes-Benz C291
- Mercedes-Benz C292 (stillborn concept)
