= Cougar C26S =

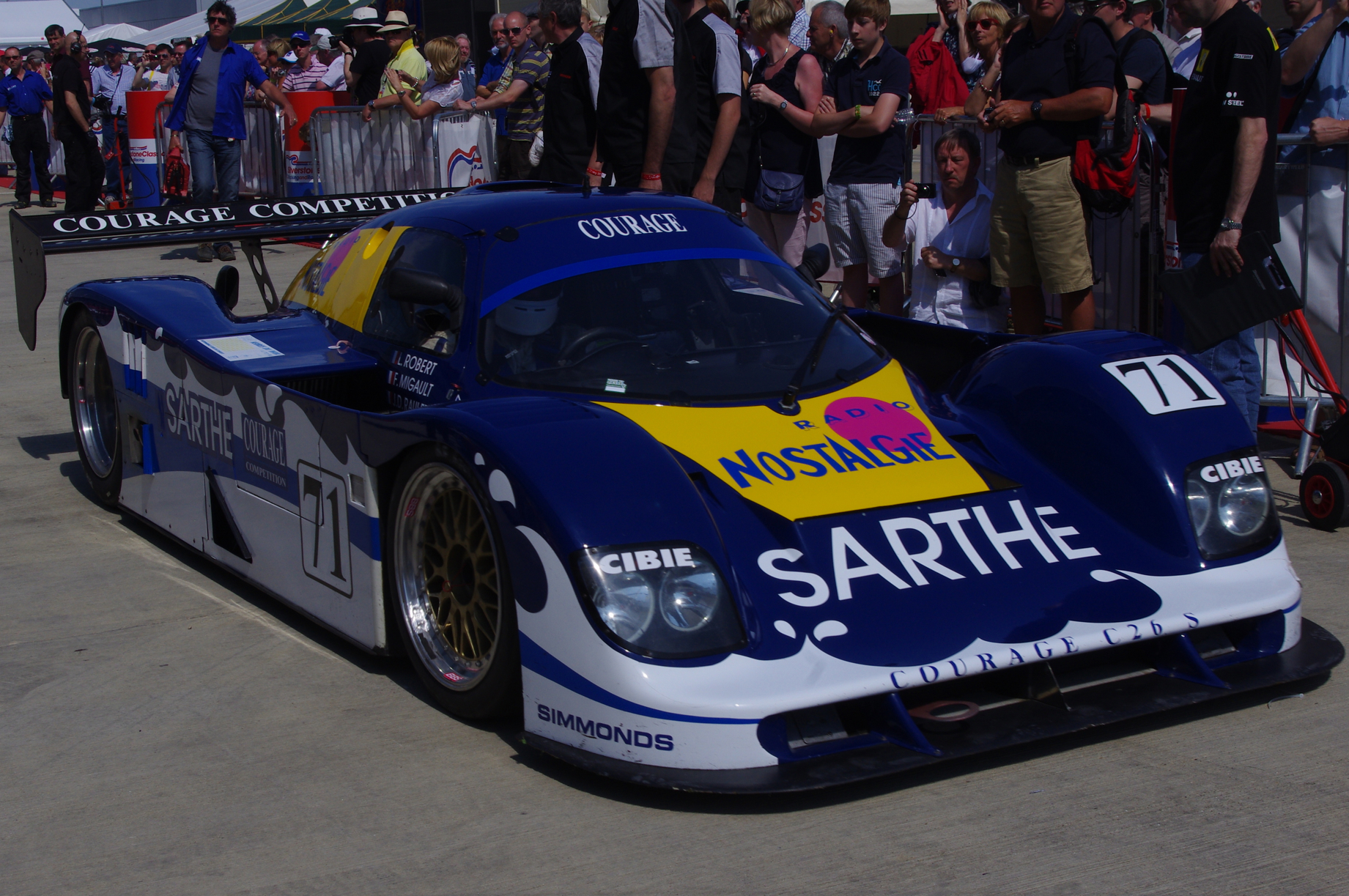
Cougar C26

The Cougar C26S was a Group C sports car prototype built by Courage Compétition. It was used in the World Sports-Prototype Championship sports car racing series in 1991. Power came from a 3.0-liter Porsche 6-cylinder turbocharged engine. It achieved one podium finish; with its best results being a 2nd-place finish at the 1991 Most Interserie race, being driven by Frenchman Lionel Robert.
