= Mercedes-Benz C292 =

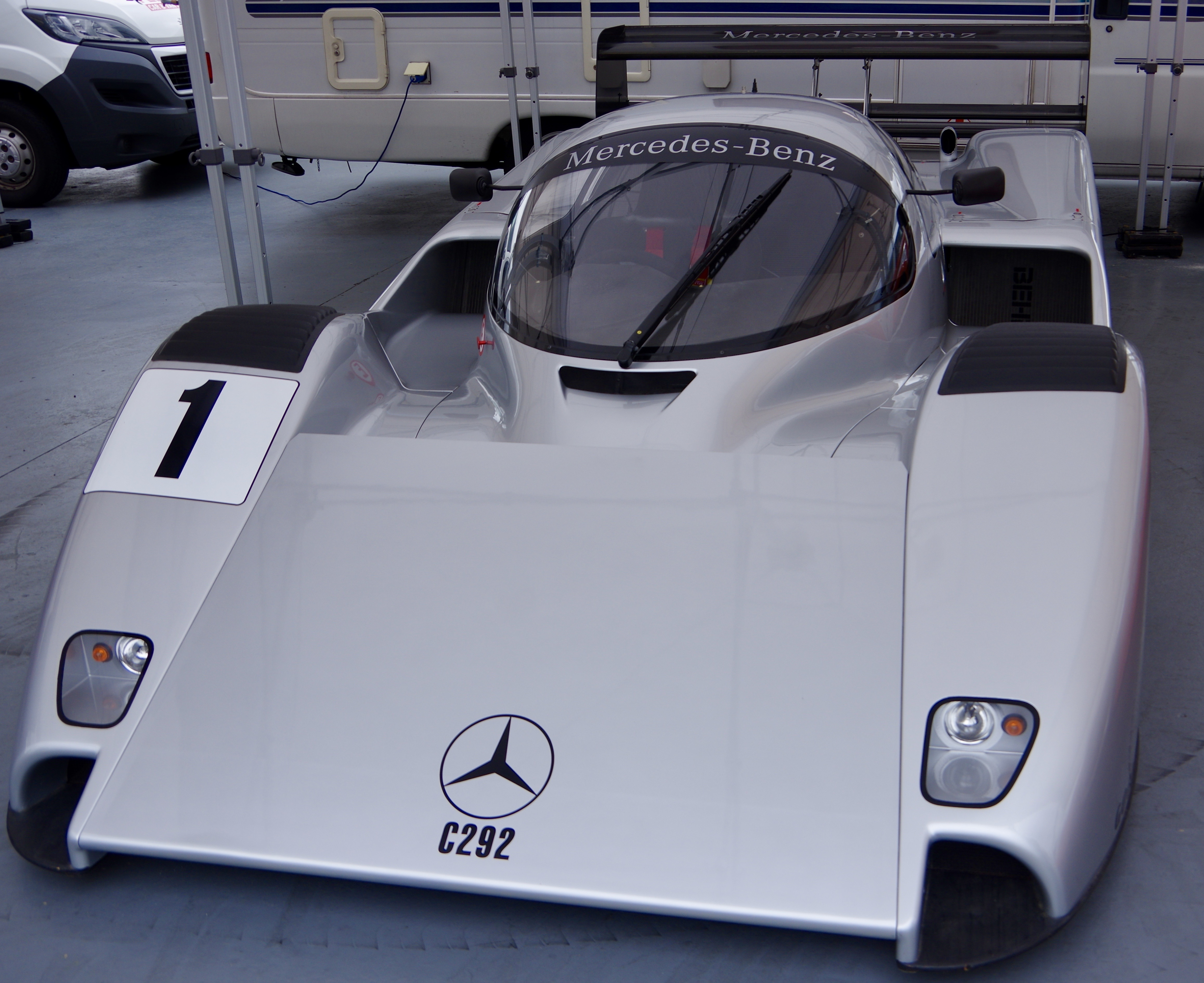
- The C292 at the 2017 Silverstone Classic
- Category: Group C Prototype
- Constructor: Sauber Motorsport
- Predecessor: Mercedes-Benz C291

Technical specifications
- Chassis: Lightweight carbonfiber composite monocoque
- Suspension (front): Unknown
- Suspension (rear): Unknown
- Engine: Mercedes-Benz M291 180° 3.5 L (3,497cc) flat-12, naturally aspirated
- Transmission: Unknown
- Fuel: Unknown
- Tyres: Goodyear

Competition history
- Debut: Never raced

The Mercedes-Benz C292 was a stillborn Group C prototype race car intended for the 1992 World Sportscar Championship season as an evolution of the Mercedes-Benz C291, but never raced due to Mercedes-Benz withdrawing from sportscar racing after a dismal 1991 season.

Built by Sauber for Mercedes-Benz, the C292 featured the same Mercedes-Benz M291 3.5L Flat-12 which had initially disappointed in 1991, but during the offseason continued development and testing and was finally able to produce power similar to Jaguar, Peugeot, and Toyota.

However, given the large amount of money Mercedes-Benz had invested in sportscar racing since their return, while receiving very little returns even after winning two championships and a 24 Hours of Le Mans, the decision was made to cancel the project after only a few C292s had been produced by Sauber. The exact number of C292s that were built is unknown, however one remaining copy is on display in the Sauber museum.

With the cancellation, the C292 was never tested, and therefore its potential in comparison to its competitors was never able to be seen. It is unknown if Mercedes even got to the point of installing the M291 engine in the C292.

This would be the last Mercedes-Benz sportscar until the launch of the CLK-GTR in 1997.

== See also ==
- Mercedes-Benz motorsport
