= Alfa Romeo SE 048SP =

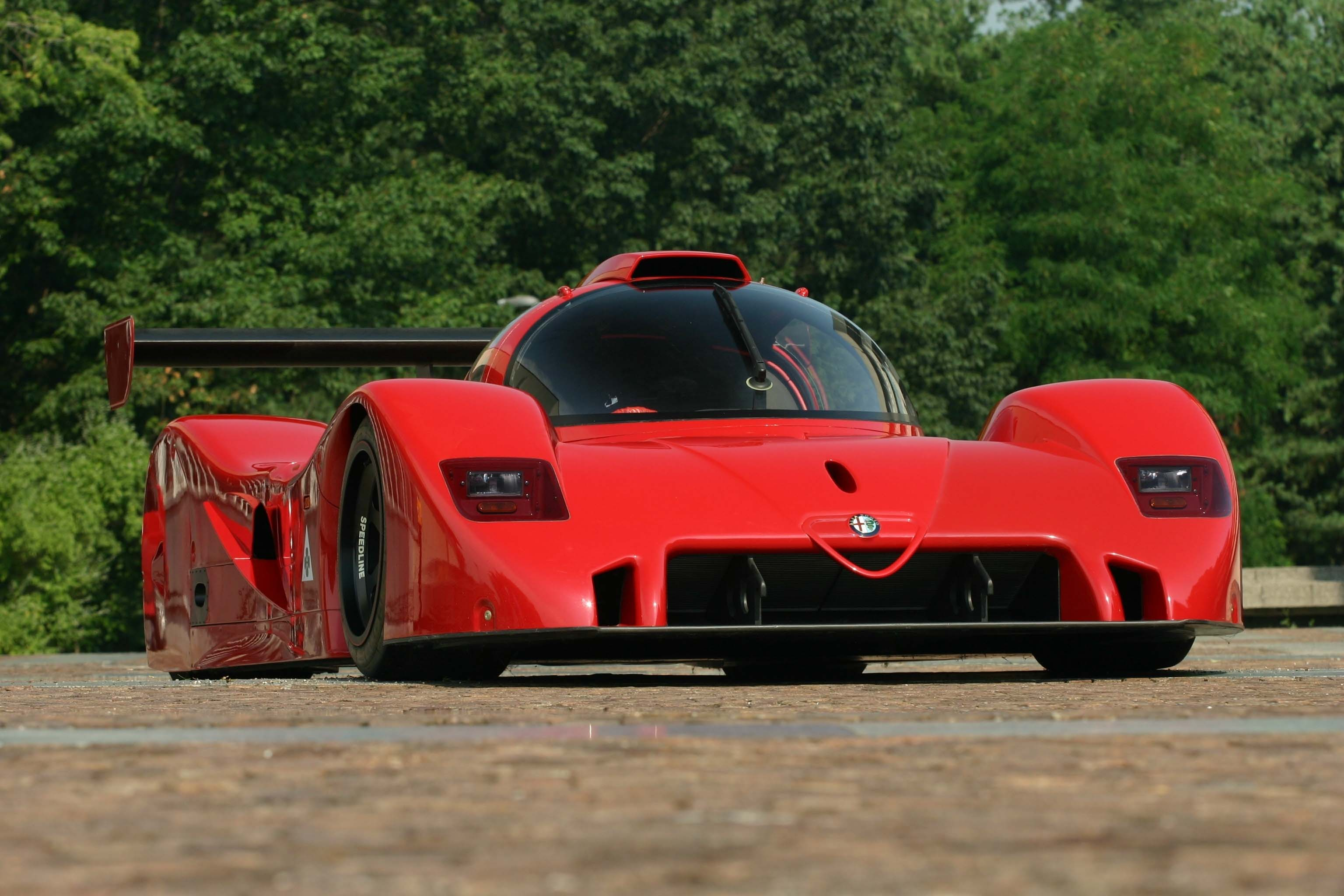
- Category: Group C
- Constructor: Alfa-Lancia Industriale
- Designer: Giuseppe Petrotta
- Predecessor: Lancia LC2

Technical specifications
- Engine: Alfa Romeo Tipo 1035 3,495 cc (213.3 cu in) naturally aspirated 40 valve, DOHC V10. Ferrari 3,498 cc (213.5 cu in) naturally aspirated 60 valve, DOHC V12. Mid-engined, longitudinally mounted
- Transmission: 6-speed manual

Competition history
Races	Wins	Poles	F/Laps
0	0	0	0

The Alfa Romeo SE 048SP was a Group C racing car built by Alfa Romeo in the early 1990s. Designed to replace the Lancia LC2 after the Group C regulations had undergone a major revamp, the SE 048SP had an Abarth-developed chassis mated to the 3.5-litre V10 engine from the stillborn Alfa Romeo 164 Procar, but, although at least one SE 048SP was built, it never left the development phase. The V10 engine appears to have been replaced by a Ferrari-sourced 3.5-litre V12 engine at some point during its development, although this was never officially confirmed by Alfa Romeo.

== Design and development ==
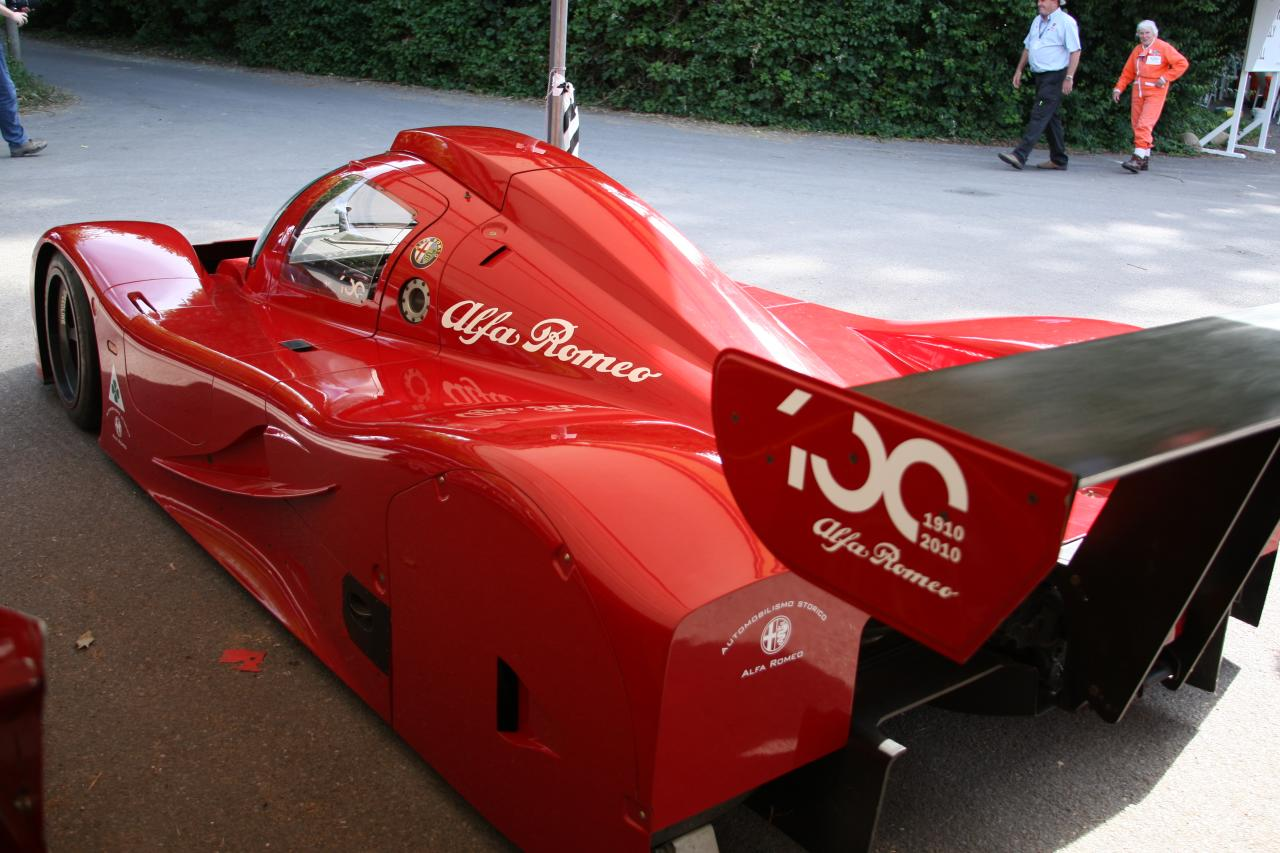
The Alfa Romeo SE 048SP, as it appeared at the 2010 Goodwood Festival of Speed.

In 1990, the Group C regulations underwent a major revamp, with the primary focus being on changing the engines to 3.5-litre units sourced from Formula One cars. The Fiat Group had previously run the Lancia LC2 in the Group C category, but had cancelled that project in 1986 after only winning one race with the LC2. In 1990, Lancia were primarily focusing on the World Rally Championship (with the Group A Delta Integrale), whilst Ferrari were focusing on their Formula One programme; this meant that Alfa Romeo were the only member of the Fiat Group that would have the capacity for a sports car racing programme; they had last competed in top-level sports car events in the 1970s, with the Alfa Romeo Tipo 33. As Abarth had previously developed the Lancia LC2, it was them who Fiat turned to for the chassis development of the new Group C car, which was assigned the project code of "SE 048SP". Giuseppe Petrotta, formerly of Osella, was the man selected to design the SE 048SP, and he drew up a fairly conventional car, with radiators mounted in the front of the chassis, covered rear wheels, and a nose that featured the traditional Alfa Romeo grille.

The project itself was a well-kept secret, and very little was ever revealed about the car's specifications. One thing that Alfa Romeo did reveal was that it used the 3.5-litre Tipo 1035 V10 engine from the still-born Alfa Romeo 164 Procar; this was a naturally aspirated 72 degree V10 originally designed for the Ligier Formula One team, and produced a claimed output of 620 hp (462 kW; 629 PS) at 13,300 RPM. It is believed that the car was built in 1990, as it had a much simpler rear wing than those found on cars built for the 1991 World Sportscar Championship season, but no official build date was given. MOMO's founder Gianpiero Moretti had apparently been in talks with Alfa Romeo about using the SE 048SP, but these did not result in any deal being made. As a result, although at least one SE 048SP was built, the car never left the development phase, and never raced. It ended up in Alfa Romeo's Museo Storico, but made a public appearance at the 2010 Goodwood Festival of Speed, where it appeared to be fitted with a 3.5-litre Ferrari V12 engine, producing a claimed output of 680 hp (507 kW; 689 PS) at 12,750 RPM. This may have been because the V10 engine had proved fragile in the "Abarth SE047", which was a re-engined Lancia LC2 used as a test-bed for the SE 048SP project. The budget that the SE 048SP would have used, in combination with the money used in Lancia's WRC programme, were used instead on the Alfa Romeo 155 touring car programme, which saw Alfa Romeo win numerous national championships, most notably the Deutsche Tourenwagen Meisterschaft in 1993, and the British Touring Car Championship in 1994.
