= Gebhardt C88 =

1988 sports prototype racing car

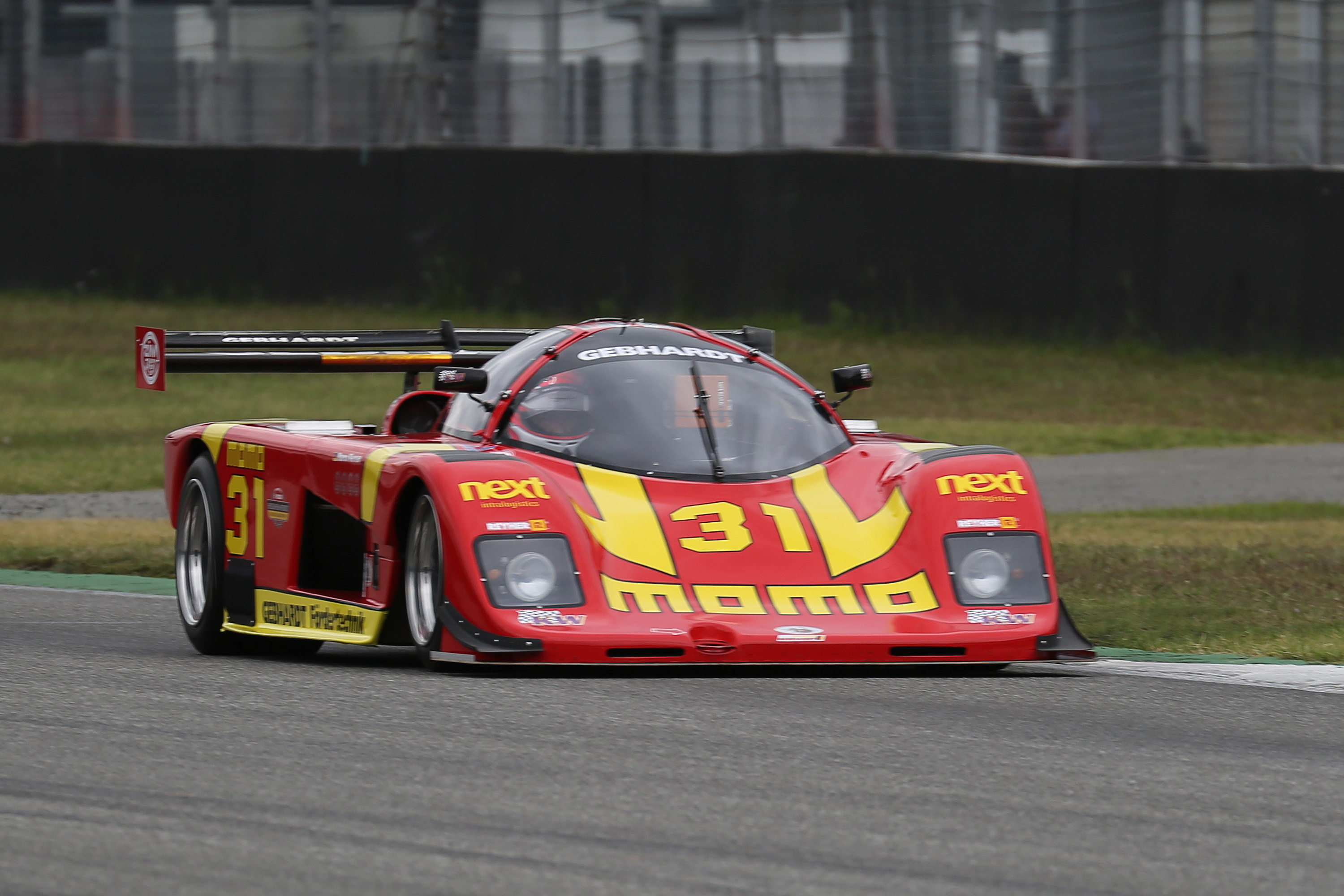
- Category: Group C2/Interserie Division I/II
- Constructor: Gebhardt Motorsport

Technical specifications
- Chassis: Aluminium monocoque with semi-stressed engine
- Suspension (front): Double wishbones, coil springs over dampers, anti-roll bar
- Suspension (rear): Double wishbones, rocker-actuated coil springs over dampers, anti-roll bar
- Length: 4,500 mm (177.2 in)
- Width: 1,950 mm (76.8 in)
- Axle track: 1,475 mm (58.1 in) (front); 1,563 mm (61.5 in) (rear)
- Wheelbase: 2,545 mm (100.2 in)
- Engine: Audi 2,110 cc (128.8 cu in) I5, turbocharged, mid-mounted
- Transmission: Hewland FGB 5-speed manual
- Weight: 770 kg (1,697.6 lb)
- Brakes: AP Racing ventilated discs, 330mm (13 in)
- Tyres: Goodyear

Competition history

The Gebhardt C88 is a sports prototype race car, designed, developed and built by German constructor Gebhardt Motorsport, for the Group C2 category of the European Interserie and German ADAC Supercup championships, in 1988. It was briefly converted to an IMSA GTP car, and was entered into the 1990 24 Hours of Daytona, but did not start. It was powered by a 560 hp (420 kW) turbocharged Audi straight-five engine, the same type used in the successful Audi Sport Quattro Group B rally car.
