= Cougar C12 =

Prototype race car

The Cougar C12 was a Group C sports car prototype race car, designed, developed and built by French constructor Cougar in 1985, and used in sports car racing from 1985 to 1988. Its best result was an 18th-place finish at the 1986 24 Hours of Le Mans, being driven by Yves Courage, Alain de Cadenet, and Pierre-Henri Raphanel.

== Development history and technology ==
The Cougar C12 is a closed Group C prototype, was developed and built by Yves Courage in 1985 and prepared for the respective races by his own racing team, Cougar. Powered by a 3-liter Porsche 6-cylinder turbocharged engine, and made its debut at the 1985 24 Hours of Le Mans, with drivers Henri Pescarolo and Yves Courage. It was later succeeded by the more successful C20, in 1987.
