= Biscay (disambiguation) =

Biscay is a province of Spain and a historical territory of the Basque Country.

Biscay may also refer to:

== Places ==
- Bay of Biscay, a gulf on the Atlantic coast of France and Spain
  - Biscay, a sea area in the BBC Shipping Forecast
- Biscay Bay, Newfoundland and Labrador, Canada
- Biscay, Minnesota, a city in the United States
- Biscayarfonna, a glacier in Svalbard, Norway
- Nueva Vizcaya, a province in the Philippines named after the Spanish province Biscay

== Other uses ==
- Biscay (horse) (fl. from 1965), Australian thoroughbred racehorse

== See also ==
- Vizcaya (disambiguation)
- Biscayne (disambiguation)
- Lordship of Biscay c. 1040 to 1876
- Biscaya, a song and album by James Last
- Bizcaya (football team), was an association football team from Bilbao, Spain
