= Cougar C24 =

The Cougar C24 was a Group C sports car prototype designed, developed, and built by French constructor Cougar, and used in the World Sports-Prototype Championship sports car racing series in 1990. Power came from a 3.0 L (180 cu in) Porsche 6-cylinder turbocharged engine. Its best result was a 7th-place finish at the 1990 24 Hours of Le Mans, being driven by Pascal Fabre, Michel Trollé, and Lionel Robert.
