= Mercedes-Benz C291 =

Racing car

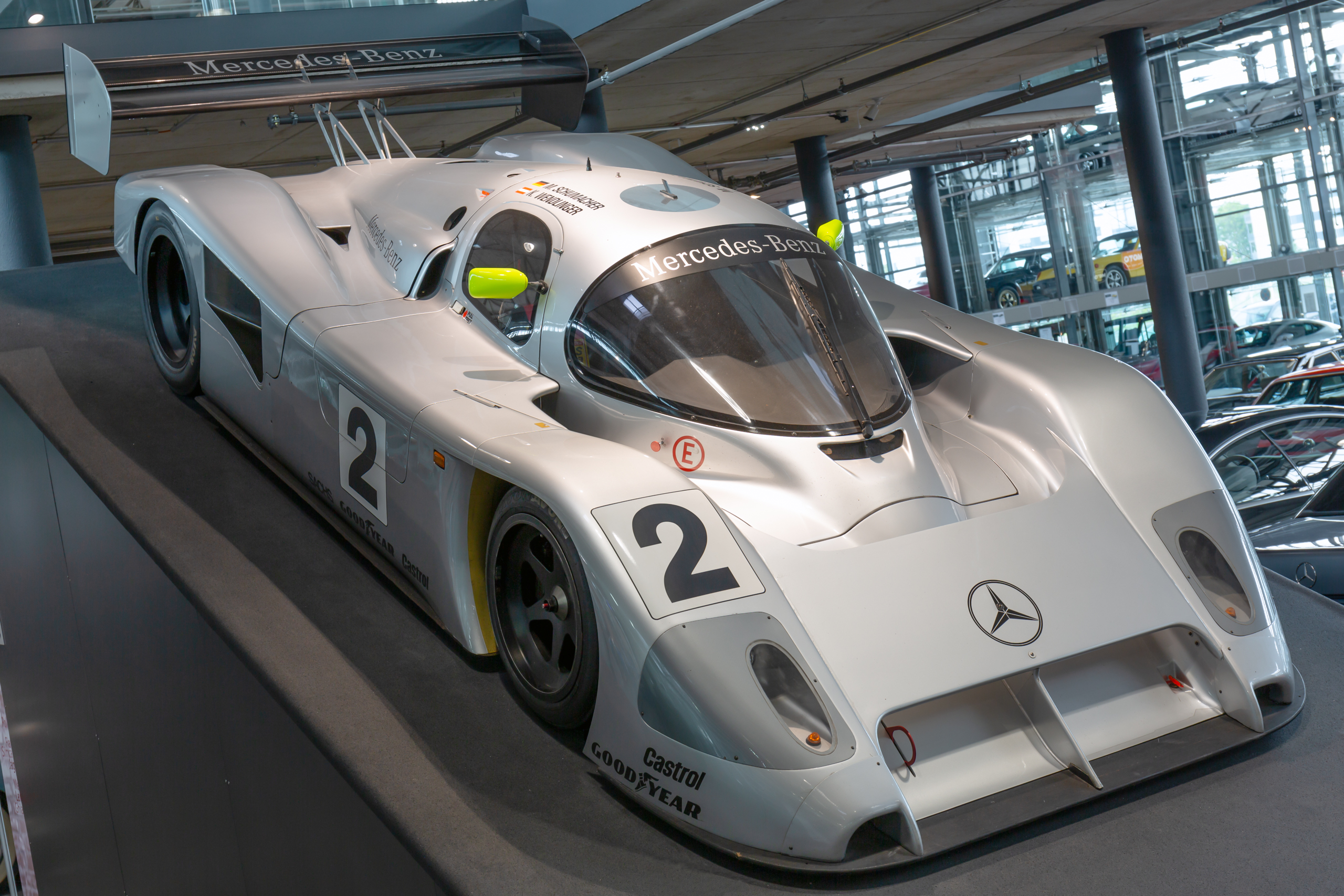
- The C291 in the Michael Schumacher Private Collection
- Category: Group C Prototype
- Constructor: Sauber Motorsport
- Predecessor: Mercedes-Benz C11
- Successor: Mercedes-Benz C292

Technical specifications
- Chassis: Carbon fiber reinforced plastic monocoque
- Suspension (front): Independent double wishbone, pushrod springs and dampers
- Suspension (rear): Independent double wishbone, pushrod springs and dampers
- Engine: Mercedes-Benz M291 180° 3.5 L (3,500cc) flat-12, naturally aspirated
- Transmission: 6-speed transverse manual
- Fuel: Castrol
- Tyres: Goodyear

Competition history
- Notable entrants: (Germany) Team Sauber Mercedes
- Notable drivers: (France) Jean-Louis Schlesser; (Germany) Jochen Mass; (Austria) Karl Wendlinger; (Germany) Michael Schumacher; (Germany) Fritz Kreutzpointner
- Debut: 1991 430 km of Monza
- First win: 1991 430 km of Autopolis
- Last win: 1991 430 km of Autopolis
- Last event: 1991 430 km of Autopolis
Entries	Races	Wins	Podiums
8	8	1	3

The Mercedes-Benz C291 was a sports-prototype racing car introduced for the 1991 World Sportscar Championship season. It was Mercedes-Benz’ final car in the Group C category.

== Introduction ==
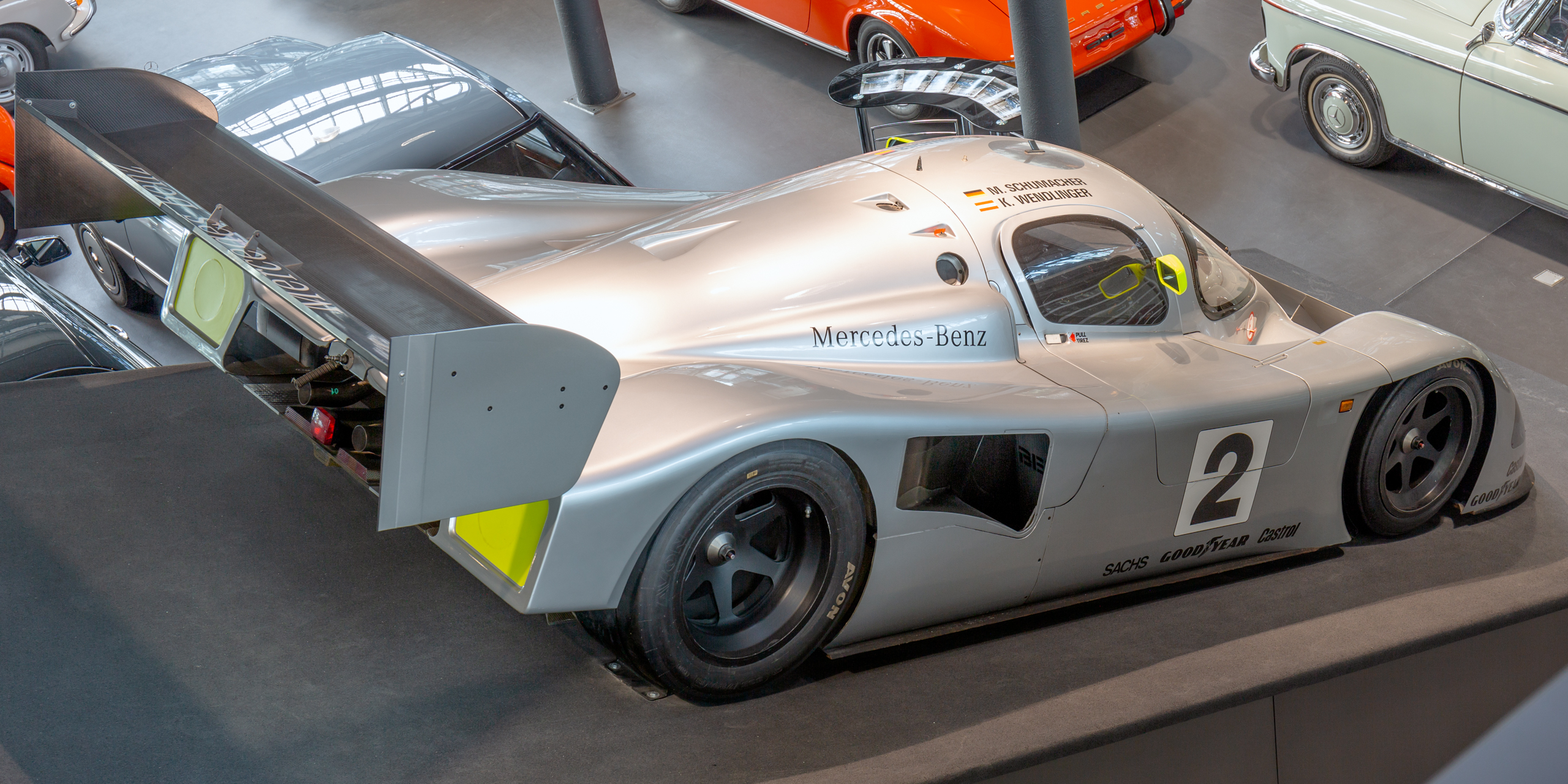
Mercedes-Benz C291 in the Michael Schumacher Private Collection

The 1991 season marked the introduction of the FIA’s new, and controversial, 3.5 litre formula which replaced the highly successful Group C category that had been used in the World Sportscar Championship since 1982, though due to a small number of entries for the 3.5 litre formula heavily penalised Group C cars (which were subject to weight penalties and started behind the new-style C1 entries on the grid) were allowed to participate in the season's C2 category.

To meet the new regulations Mercedes-Benz came up with an all-new car; the C291 which was designed by its racing partner Sauber.

One survived and is on display in the Carl Benz Museum in Ladenburg, Germany. Another one is located in the Michael Schumacher Collection in Cologne, and this is the Autopolis-winning chassis.

== Engine ==
The primary feature of the new regulations was the use of a 3.5 litre naturally aspirated engine. This made it impossible for Mercedes-Benz to use the engines from its previous Group C cars. Also, to produce similar power to the Group C cars a 3.5 litre naturally aspirated engine had to be very high-revving and be constructed from different materials in order to rev highly.

Unlike Jaguar's XJR-14 who had the readily available and proven Ford HB V8 engine from the Benetton B190B Formula One car (the engine regulations for the new 3.5 litre formula were identical to Formula One), Mercedes-Benz had to design an all-new purpose-built racing engine and its M-291 3.5L flat-12 unit was the result. The engine produced about 550–600 brake horsepower (410–450 kW) compared to about 730 brake horsepower (540 kW) produced by the 5.0 litre twin turbo V8 found in the C291's predecessor, the Mercedes-Benz C11.

== Design ==
Unlike the Jaguar XJR-14, the C291 resembled previous sports-prototypes, despite the fact that the redesign of the Le Mans Circuit de la Sarthe in 1990 meant cars with their low drag design, top-end power, straight-line acceleration and top-speed characteristics were no longer required. Unlike the Jaguar (and latterly the Peugeot 905B) the Mercedes still featured a full-width low-drag single-tier rear wing and no front wing. This resulted in the car having a higher top speed than the Jaguar (and only slightly less than old Group C cars).

However, this, allied to the characteristics of the 3.5 litre engine, meant the car would have slower acceleration above 150-170 mph than most Group C cars, therefore not taking advantage of the low-drag design, and conversely the low-drag design meant the car was slower in the corners than the Jaguar and Peugeot's 905B, this time not taking advantage of the lower kerb weight of 750 kilograms (1,653 lb). Overall the C291 was not as fast as a contemporary Formula One car around some circuits used by the Grand Prix fraternity, and was a lot slower at Le Mans' Circuit de la Sarthe in 1991.

== Race results ==
During the development and testing of the new M291 powerplant, it became apparent to Sauber Mercedes that there were problems in the engine design and construction. Thus the team started the 1991 season with a lone C291, while at the same time running an older C11. In the first two races of the season, the C291 failed to finish while the C11 finished 2nd and 3rd. At the third race, the C291 scored a 2nd-place finish, ahead of the C11. For the fourth round, the 1991 24 Hours of Le Mans, the team decided that the C291 would not be capable of completing the race, and thus were forced to enter three C11s.

After Le Mans, Sauber Mercedes decided that the C291 had been developed enough to compete on its own, and it finished the season without running a C11 alongside. However, the C291 failed to finish the next three races of the season. Only in the final race of the year at Autopolis was the C291 not only able to finish, but also able to score its only win. Sauber Mercedes finished the season third in the teams championship.

After much disappointment the C291 was planned to be replaced by the more radical C292 for the 1992 season, but Mercedes-Benz decided to pull out of sportscar racing before the C292 could compete and turned to Formula 1 in 1993, although it did not continue to use the troublesome M291 powerplant.

== Complete World Sportscar Championship results ==
Year	Entrant	Class	Drivers	No.	1	2	3	4	5	6	7	8	Points	WEMCP
1991	Team Sauber Mercedes	Group C			SUZ	MNZ	SIL	LMS	NUR	MAG	MEX	AUT	70	3rd
1991	Team Sauber Mercedes	Group C	(France) Jean-Louis Schlesser	1					14	18	11	5	70	3rd
1991	Team Sauber Mercedes	Group C	(Germany) Jochen Mass	1					14		11	5	70	3rd
1991	Team Sauber Mercedes	Group C	(Austria) Karl Wendlinger	2	14	14	2	DNQ	15	14	12	1	70	3rd
1991	Team Sauber Mercedes	Group C	(Germany) Michael Schumacher	2	14	14	2	DNQ	15	14	12	1	70	3rd
1991	Team Sauber Mercedes	Group C	(Germany) Fritz Kreutzpointner	2				DNQ					70	3rd
