= Cougar C22 =

The Cougar C22 was a Group C sports car prototype used in the World Sports-Prototype Championship sports car racing series, from 1988 to 1989.

== Development history and racing record ==
The Cougar C20, a closed Group C prototype, was developed by Yves Courage in 1987 and prepared for the respective races by his own racing team, the Courage Compétition. Powered by a 2.8-liter Porsche 6-cylinder turbocharged engine, where it made its debut at the 24 Hours of Le Mans, and retired after 30 laps. The car's best result was a 6th-place finish at 1989 480 km of Dijon, which was also its best overall finish, being driven by Pascal Fabre and Jean-Louis Bousquet. It was driven by Ukyou Katayama, François Migault, Paul Belmondo, Pascal Fabre, Hervé Regout, Jean-Denis Delétraz, Fabien Giroix, Oscar Manautou, Alessandro Santin, Jean-Louis Bousquet, Bernard de Dryver, Denis Morin, Bernard Santal, Patrick Gonin, and Jiro Yoneyama.
