= Cheetah G603 =

- Category: Group C
- Constructor: Cheetah Automobiles
- Designer: Chuck Graemiger
- Production: 2
- Predecessor: Cheetah G602
- Successor: Cheetah G604

Technical specifications
- Length: 166.8 inches (4,236.7 mm)
- Width: 68 inches (1,727.2 mm)
- Height: 43 inches (1,092.2 mm)
- Wheelbase: 99.9 inches (2,537.5 mm)
- Engine: Cosworth DFL 3,955 cc (241.3 cu in) V8, naturally-aspirated, mid-engined
- Power: 567 brake horsepower (574.9 PS; 422.8 kW); 600 newton-metres (442.5 lb⋅ft)
- Weight: 700 kilograms (1,543.2 lb)

Competition history
- Notable entrants: Cheetah Automobiles
- Notable drivers: Loris Kessel; Laurent Ferrier; Jean-Pierre Jaussaud; Rolf Biland
- Debut: 1983 1000 km of Spa
Entries	Races	Wins	Poles	F/Laps
5	3	0	0	0
- Teams' Championships: 0
- Constructors' Championships: 0
- Drivers' Championships: 0

The Cheetah G603 was a Group C sports racing car built by Cheetah Automobiles in 1983. One car was built, and it was fitted with a 4-litre Cosworth DFL V8 engine; it had a short and fairly unsuccessful season before being replaced by the even less successful Cheetah G604 in 1984.

== Racing history ==
Built in 1983, the Cheetah G603 featured a 4-litre Cosworth DFL V8 engine, as was common for smaller Group C entries towards the beginning of the era. Cheetah Automobiles ran the G603 in their own work's team, and attempted to enter it in the 1983 24 Hours of Le Mans, with Loris Kessel, Laurent Ferrier and Florian Vetsch selected as its drivers; however, they did not actually attend the event. Instead, the G603 was debuted at the fifth round of the FIA World Endurance Championship season, which was the 1000 km of Spa; Jean-Pierre Jaussaud replaced Vetsch, but an engine failure after 26 laps forced the team to retire. Having then missed the 1000 km of Brands Hatch, Cheetah entered Kessel, Ferrier and Rolf Biland in the G603 at the 1000 km of Imola; they finished the race, but were classified ninth overall, and second-to-last of the Group C finishers. Cheetah finished off by entering the eighth round of the European Endurance Championship, which was the 1000 km of Mugello; Kessel and Ferrier brought the G603 home in eighth, and this time beat three cars in the Group C category. This would be the last time the G603 was used, as Cheetah instead ran the G604 for 1984 and 1985, with even less success.
