= Vizcaya =

Vizcaya (Spanish, 'Biscay') may refer to:

== Places ==
- Biscay, a Basque region and a province of Spain
  - Biscay (Congress of Deputies constituency)
  - Biscay (Basque Parliament constituency)
  - Biscay (Senate constituency)
- Vizcaya Museum and Gardens, formerly Villa Vizcaya, in Miami, Florida, U.S.
- Vizcaya station, in Miami, Florida, U.S.

== People ==
- Pierre de Vizcaya (1894–1933), Spanish motor racer

== Other uses ==
- Vizcaya (planthopper), a genus of insects
- Spanish cruiser Vizcaya, a Spanish Navy armored cruiser that fought in the Spanish–American War
- Vizcaya (1890), Filipino World War II era freighter
- Vizcaya, a radio-controlled boat developed by Leonardo Torres Quevedo in 1905
- Vizcaya Day, commonly known as Ammungan Festival.

== See also ==
- Biscay (disambiguation)
- Nueva Vizcaya, a province on Luzon Island, Philippines
- Nueva Vizcaya, New Spain, in present-day Mexico
