= Courage Compétition =

Auto racing team

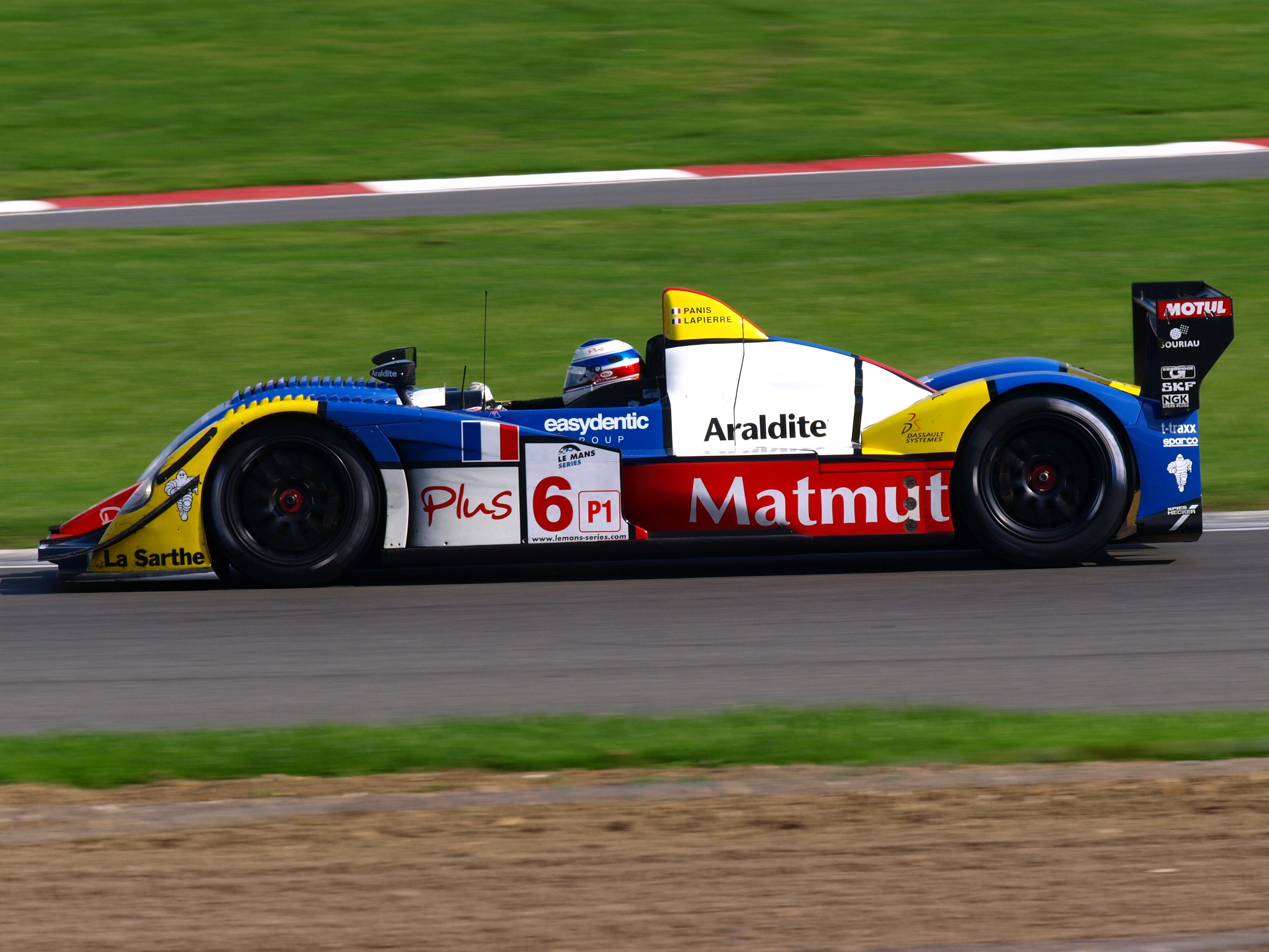
An Oreca-Courage LC70

Courage Compétition was a racing team and chassis constructor company now owned by Oreca, based in Le Mans, France, near the Circuit de la Sarthe. It was founded by Yves Courage, a French race driver who ran hillclimbs before founding the company in 1981. Following the purchase of Courage by Oreca in 2007, Yves Courage has refounded the company as Courage Technology in 2010, attempting to develop electric racing cars.

== History ==
=== Yves Courage ===
Yves Courage (born on April 27, 1948) began his racing career in 1972, racing in various hillclimbs throughout the 1970s. By 1980, he had won over 80 hillclimb races, including the Mont-Dore. However, in 1977, Yves Courage moved to sports car racing, participating in his first 24 Hours of Le Mans. In 1981, along with Jean-Philippe Grand, Courage's Lola-BMW managed to finish the race and take victory in the under 2-liter sport class. With this success, Courage decided to found his own company and began building prototype chassis with which he could compete at Le Mans. On this premise, Courage Compétition was founded with the construction of the Courage C01 prototype in 1982.

=== Early years ===
Debuting at the 1982 24 Hours of Le Mans, Courage's first C01 chassis participated in the also new Group C class using a Ford Cosworth DFL V8. The car managed to last a mere 78 laps before it was forced to retire. Courage would continue on in the following years with the C01 and its follow-up, the C02. The team also earned the sponsorship of Primagaz to help financially, while the chassis would be renamed Cougar instead of Courage, a trend which would continue for many years. However, the team would fail to finish at Le Mans again in 1983 and 1984. For 1985 however, the team announced a deal with Porsche which would bolster their capabilities.

=== Porsche era ===
For 1985, Yves Courage signed a deal with Porsche to use their engines in replacement for the Ford Cosworths. To better fit the Porsche turbocharged flat-6 engine, Courage debuted the Cougar C12 chassis. The team saw immediate success with this combination as they finished 20th in 1985, followed by 18th in 1986. All of this built up to the team's greatest achievement so far in 1987, as they managed to finish third overall, behind only the factory Porsche 962 and their own team's 962. During the same year, Courage participated in a partial season of the World Sportscar Championship, managing eighth in the teams championship with their Cougar C20 and Porsche 962. Following this success, and believing that his chassis and team were capable of succeeding at Le Mans, Yves Courage officially retired from driving in order to concentrate on running the factory.

For 1988, the team was not able to follow up on its success, failing to finish any of its three entries at Le Mans and only managing to score points in a single World Sportscar Championship round. This was quickly reversed for 1989 as the team managed to win the C2 class at Le Mans with a 14th-place finish, and take 11th place in the World Sportscar Championship by scoring points in over half of the races that season. The next year, Courage would switch back to the C1 class and finish seventh overall at Le Mans, followed up with 11th place in 1991.

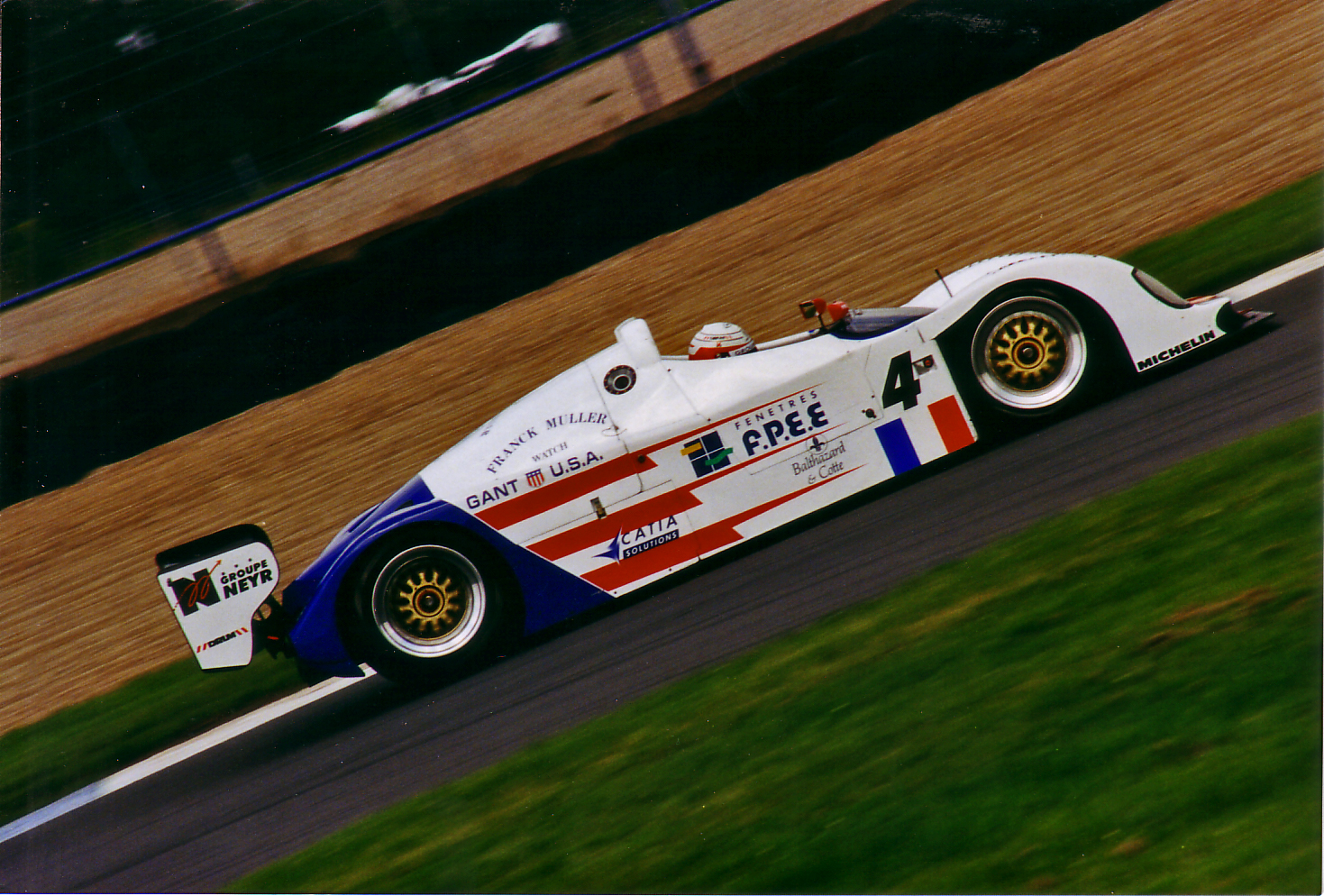
A Porsche-powered Courage C36 participating in the International Sports Racing Series

Due to rule changes in sportscar racing, Courage was shuffled to the C2 class (cars complying with the older rules) for Le Mans in 1991 and C3 (a class for Porsche-powered cars) in 1992, and no longer able to run in the diminishing World Sportscar Championship due to their continued usage of the Porsche turbocharged Flat-6, which was no longer legal in WSC. However, at Le Mans the C3-class Courage C28LM took class victory and finished sixth overall. This car was driven by Porsche factory driver Henri Pescarolo who would form a relationship with Courage in the later years.

With the demise of the World Sportscar Championship in 1993, Courage would return again to the C2 class and take both tenth and 11th-place finishes at Le Mans (fifth and sixth in class), and then followed by another seventh-place finish in 1994.

In 1995, Courage mounted its best challenge yet, with drivers Bob Wollek, Éric Hélary, and Mario Andretti challenging for the lead in the No. 13 Courage C34. In the end though, the team would have to settle for second place overall, losing by a single lap to a McLaren F1 GTR. In 1996, Courage's reliability continued as they finished seventh and 13th, but were actually second and third in their Le Mans Prototype (LMP) class. One of the two teams was actually run by Henri Pescarolo, who would begin to develop his own team in association with Courage. The duo continued their success in 1997, taking fourth, seventh, and 16th places overall. However, by 1998, Courage's partnership with Porsche was over a decade old, as was the design of the engines that Courage was using. Courage's last outing with the Porsche powerplants showed the lack of pace as the team managed to finish only 15th and 16th against newer Porsche, Ferrari, Nissan, and Toyota prototypes.

Henri Pescarolo would keep the Porsche-powered Courages alive into 1999 when he raced an older chassis for his newly founded team and would achieve an unlikely ninth-place finish.

=== Nissan engines ===
Nissan Motorsport, at the time attempting to run in the GT classes with their R390 GT1, were looking to develop an open cockpit prototype for 1999. In order to assist them in the project, Nissan turned to Courage Compétition to help them not only develop a chassis, but also to use their Nissan motor in order to help Nissan gain much needed testing and mileage. Thus in 1998, alongside two Porsche-powered Courages, two Nissan-powered Courages were also entered. Both used the Nissan VRH35Z 3.5L Turbo V8, similar to the one from the R390 GT1. However both Nissan cars failed to finish while the Porsche cars succeeded.

For 1999, Nissan would continue their involvement with Courage. Nissan would purchase a Courage C52 chassis for their own team to run alongside their own R391 prototype, while Courage would continue to use and develop the Nissan powerplants in their own car. At the end of the race, Courage's car had finished sixth, Nissan's car eighth, with Pescarolo Sport's old Courage-Porsche in ninth. However, with Nissan's R391 failing to finish and being deemed a failure, Nissan decided to drop out of sports car racing and end their involvement with Courage.

=== Modern era ===
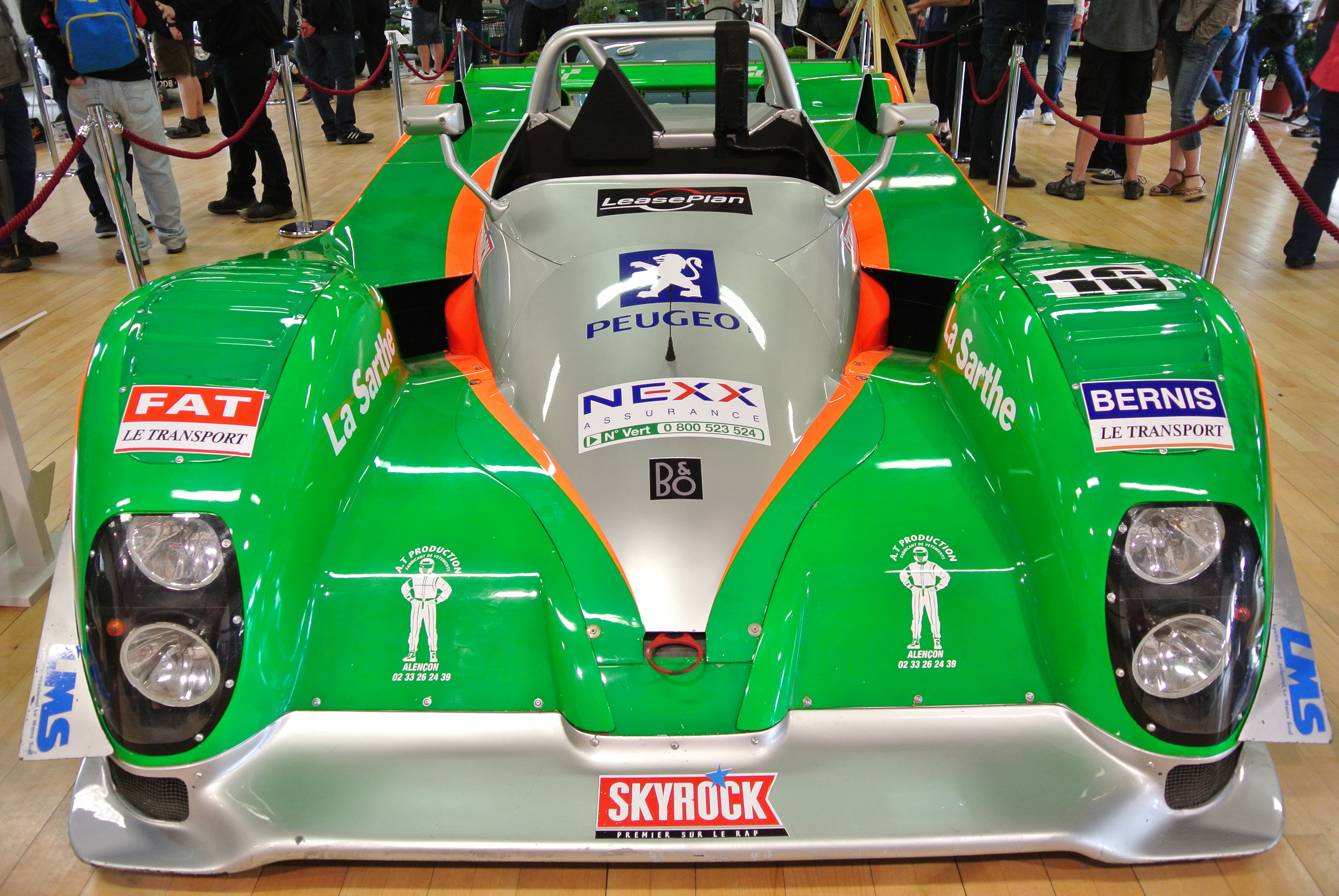
Courage C52 Peugeot 3.2l V6 as campaigned by Pescarolo Sport Team at Le Mans 2000, and finishing fourth

For 2000, Courage would debut a new state-of-the-art chassis for the LMP1 class, dubbed the C60. The C60 would use an all new V10 Judd engine to replace the departed Nissan. At the same time, Pescarolo Sport would upgrade their Courage C52 with a new Peugeot turbocharged powerplant. Pescarolo's older chassis would manage a fourth-place finish at Le Mans, while Courage's own chassis failed to finish towards the end of the race.

For 2001, Pescarolo would upgrade not only to the C60, but would purchase two of the chassis. One of the new cars would finish 13th overall, while the second failed to finish. Courage's own Judd-powered car would also fail to finish. This would continue into 2002, as Pescarolo's one finishing car managed tenth, while Courage's own car would manage 15th.

In 2003, the C60 would reach its highest point, as Courage's own car finished seventh, and Pescarolo's cars were eighth and ninth. Later in 2003, Courage would debut another chassis, known as C65, for the smaller LMP675 (later LMP2) class. This chassis would debut at the 1000km of Le Mans exhibition race and take class victory and fourth overall, behind Pescarolo's second-place finish.

At the time, Pescarolo had begun to modify their C60 chassis. By 2004, they had reached the point that they no longer resembled Courage's own C60s. Thus the cars became known as Pescarolo C60s. These modified cars would show great success leading into the 2004 season, where both Pescarolo and Courage began competition in the new Le Mans Endurance Series. Courage's own C65 would take the LMP2 teams championship in the first season, although the team failed to finish at Le Mans. Pescarolo's own cars would take a fourth place overall at Le Mans, behind the dominating Audis.

Also at this time, Courage began to supply customer chassis to teams, with Paul Belmondo and Epsilon Sport of France and Miracle Motorsports of the United States being the first to receive customer C65s. Eventually ten C65 chassis would be built, making it the largest manufacturer in LMP2 at the time.

Courage would return to concentrating on the C60, now upgraded to a "hybrid" prototype in 2005. The team would manage 8th place overall, while Pescarolo's heavily modified C60 would finish second overall.

== Later racing efforts ==
In 2006, Courage Compétition as a team became a two car effort in the Le Mans Series, with major backing from Yokohama Rubber Company and Mugen Motorsports. Mugen would replace Courage's Judd V10s with their own V8s in exchange for a new Courage chassis to be run by Mugen in the Japan Le Mans Challenge. At the same time, Courage officially replaced the aged C60 with the new LC70 LMP1. A fourth LC70 would be sold to the Swiss Spirit team, also campaigned in the Le Mans Series. Pescarolo Sport meanwhile would continue to campaign their own heavily modified C60. Pescarolo dominated the LMS LMP1 championship, winning all five races, while Swiss Spirit was fourth and Courage's teams eighth and tenth. The new Courage suffered scathing reliability issues with the Mugen engine, which hampered their chances of taking an overall win despite being a competitive car.

In LMP2, Courage's customer C65s would also claim the Le Mans Series team's championship in the hands of the Barazi-Epsilon squad. In the American Le Mans Series, Mazda's official factory effort used a C65 to finish third place in their teams championship.

At the 24 Hours of Le Mans, Pescarolo's C60s would take second and fifth place overall, while Courage's factory LC70s would fail to finish. Miracle Motorsports and Barazi-Epsilon would both bring their C65s home as well.

== Oreca ==
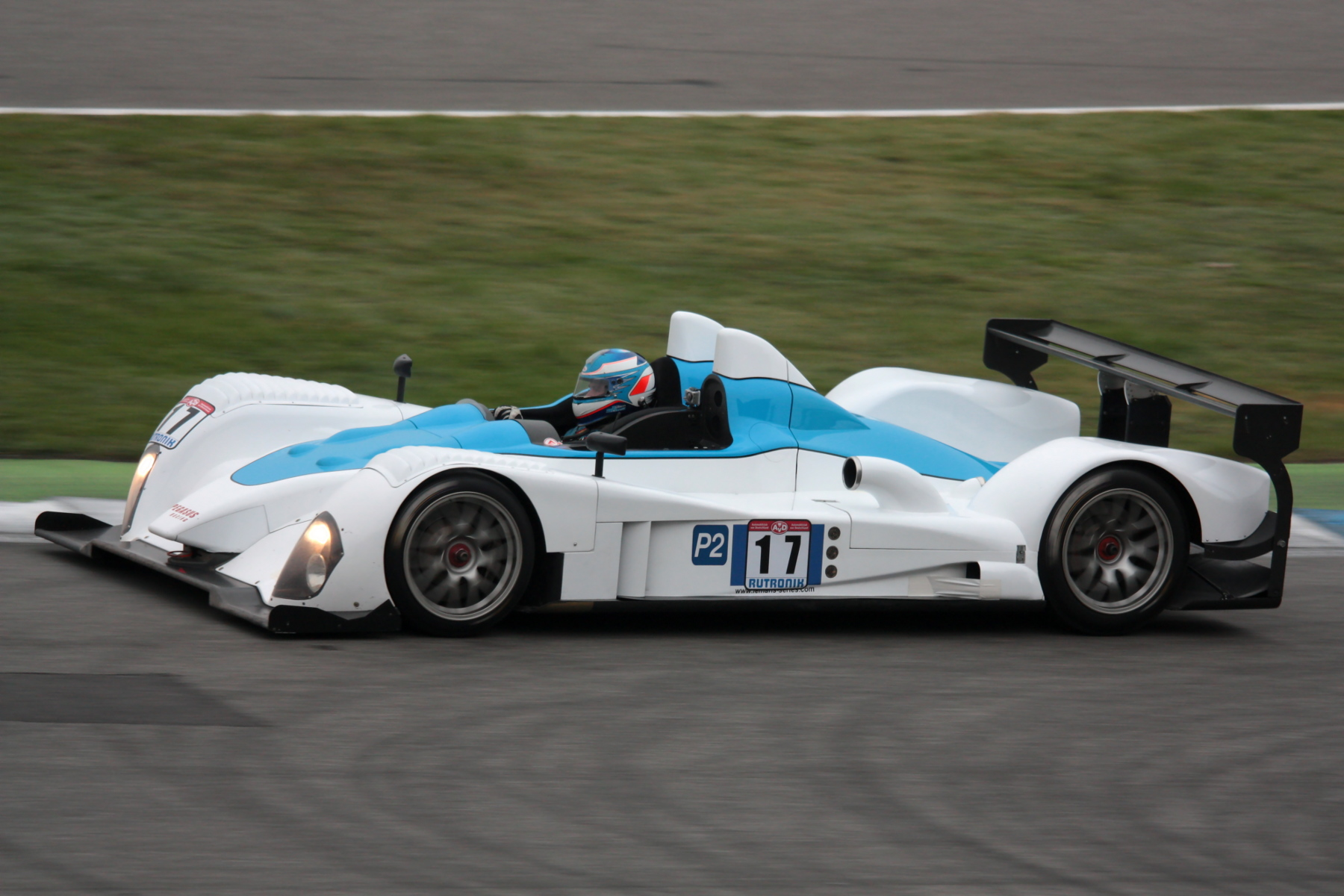
Courage LC75 of Julien Schell at Hockenheimring

After 2007, Courage created the LC75 LMP2 chassis to replace the C65. Acura officially bought three for the American Le Mans Series, although they have extensively modified the bodywork and the cars have been re-homologated as the Acura ARX-01a. Other former C65 teams in the Le Mans Series also changed to the newer LC75.

Courage ended their collaboration with Mugen Motorsports and utilized AER power in the factory cars.

Courage announced a new Indian Le Mans Project, with the intention to bring Indian drivers to Le Mans and the Le Mans Series in association with the factory squad. This project never came to fruition.

Pescarolo, forced to change their cars in order to conform to 2007 rules, continued to use their modified bodywork from the old C60, but changed the chassis as well. Thus their new cars, dubbed the Pescarolo 01, no longer bear any relation to Courage chassis, although the two teams continued to aid one another in development.

On September 14, 2007, Oreca announced their plans to purchase Courage Compétition. Yves Courage will remain with the company, while Oreca will use Courage's engineering expertise to develop an all new Le Mans Prototype.

== Racing cars ==
These are the designations of the chassis that Courage Compétition has built since its inception. The date listed is the year each chassis first competed.

- C01-Ford (1982)
- C02-Ford (1984)
- C12-Porsche (1985)
- C20-Porsche (1987)
- C22-Porsche (1988)
- C24S-Porsche (1990)
- C26S-Porsche (1991)
- C28S-Porsche (1992)
- C30LM-Porsche (1993)
- C32LM-Porsche (1994)
- C34-Porsche (1995)
- C36-Porsche (1996)
- C41-Chevrolet (1995)
- C41-Porsche (1996)
- C50-Porsche (1998)
- C51-Nissan (1998)
- C52-Nissan (1999)
- C52-Peugeot (2000)
- C60-Judd (2000)
- C60-Peugeot (2001)
- C65-JPX (2003)
- C65-AER (2005)
- C65-Judd (2005)
- LC70-Mugen (2006)
- LC70-AER (2007)
- LC75-AER (2007)
