= Cougar C01 =

French racing car

The Cougar C01, and its derivative, the Cougar C01B, were Group C sports car prototype race cars, designed, developed, and built by French constructor Cougar in 1984, and was used in sports car racing from 1982 to 1984. Its best result in the World Sportscar Championship sports car racing series was a tenth-place finish 1983 1000 km of Mugello, being driven by Yves Courage, Aldo Bertuzzi, and Gianni Giudici.

== Development history and technology ==
The Cougar C01 is a closed Group C prototype, was developed and built by Yves Courage in 1985, prepared for the respective races by his own racing team, Cougar, and was the first sports prototype made by the company. It was powered by a Formula One-derived 3.3 L (200 cu in) naturally aspirated Ford-Cosworth DFL V8 engine, producing a respectable 493 hp (368 kW) @ 9,500 rpm. This drives the rear wheels through a 5-speed manual transmission. The whole car weighed 875 kg (1,929 lb). This allowed it to reach a top speed of 205 mph (330 km/h).
