= Cougar C28 =

Sports car prototype build

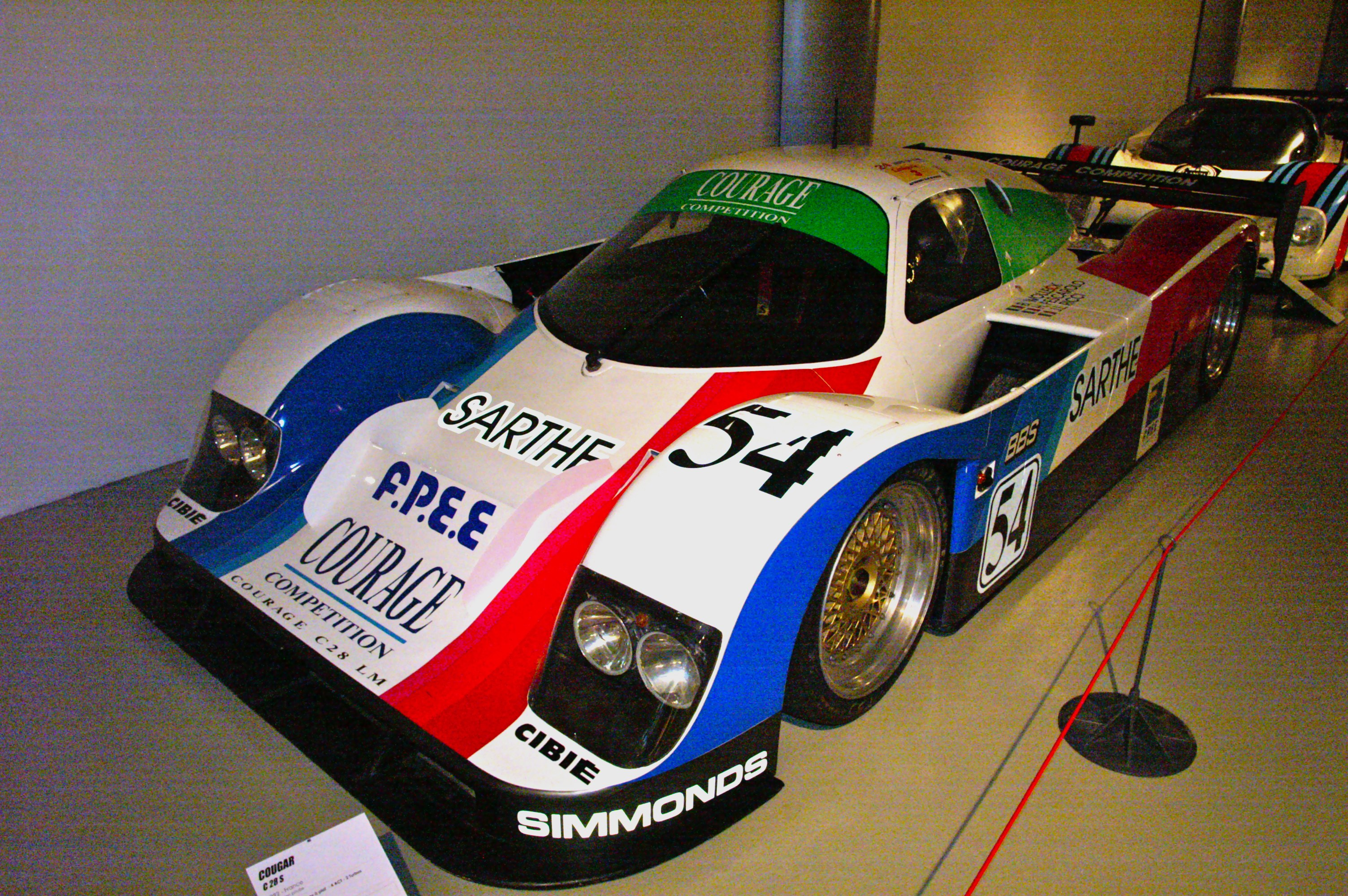
Cougar-Porsche C28S

The Cougar C28 was a Group C sports car prototype build by Courage. It was used in the World Sports-Prototype Championship sports car racing series in 1992. Power came from a 3.0-liter Porsche 6-cylinder turbocharged engine. It managed to achieve 3 podium finishes and 1 class win. Highlights include an overall 6th-place finish at that year's prestigious 24 Hours of Le Mans, two third-place finishes and a sixth-place finish for Tomas Saldaña at the Interserie races in Jarama, Zeltweg, and Brands Hatch, respectively, and a third-place finish for Marco Brand at the Interserie race in Mugello.
