= Cougar C20 =

The Cougar C20 was a Group C sports car prototype used in sports car racing from 1987 to 1990.

== Development history and technology ==
The Cougar C20, a closed Group C prototype, was developed by Yves Courage in 1987 and prepared for the respective races by his own racing team, the Courage Compétition. Powered by a 3-liter Porsche 6-cylinder turbocharged engine, the race car made its debut at the 1987 1000 km Monza race. The vehicle was driven by Joël Gouhier and Hervé Regout, who finished ninth overall after eleventh place on the grid.

== Racing history ==
The greatest success for this type of vehicle was third place overall in the 1987 24 Hours of Le Mans, driven by Regout, Yves Courage, and Pierre-Henri Raphanel.

In 1988, the C20B brought an evolutionary step to the racetrack. Both variants were used in parallel for a year, and from 1989, the B version was Courage's emergency vehicle for two years. However, this vehicle was only rolled to the start four times. 1988 at the 1000 km race of Monza and in Silverstone, as well as 1989 and 1990 at the 24-hour race of Le Mans. At Le Mans, the cars were entered in the smaller prototype class - the C2 class. There was a victory in this class in 1989 by Jean-Claude Andruet, Philippe Farjon, and Shunji Kasuya.
