= Group C =

Race car class

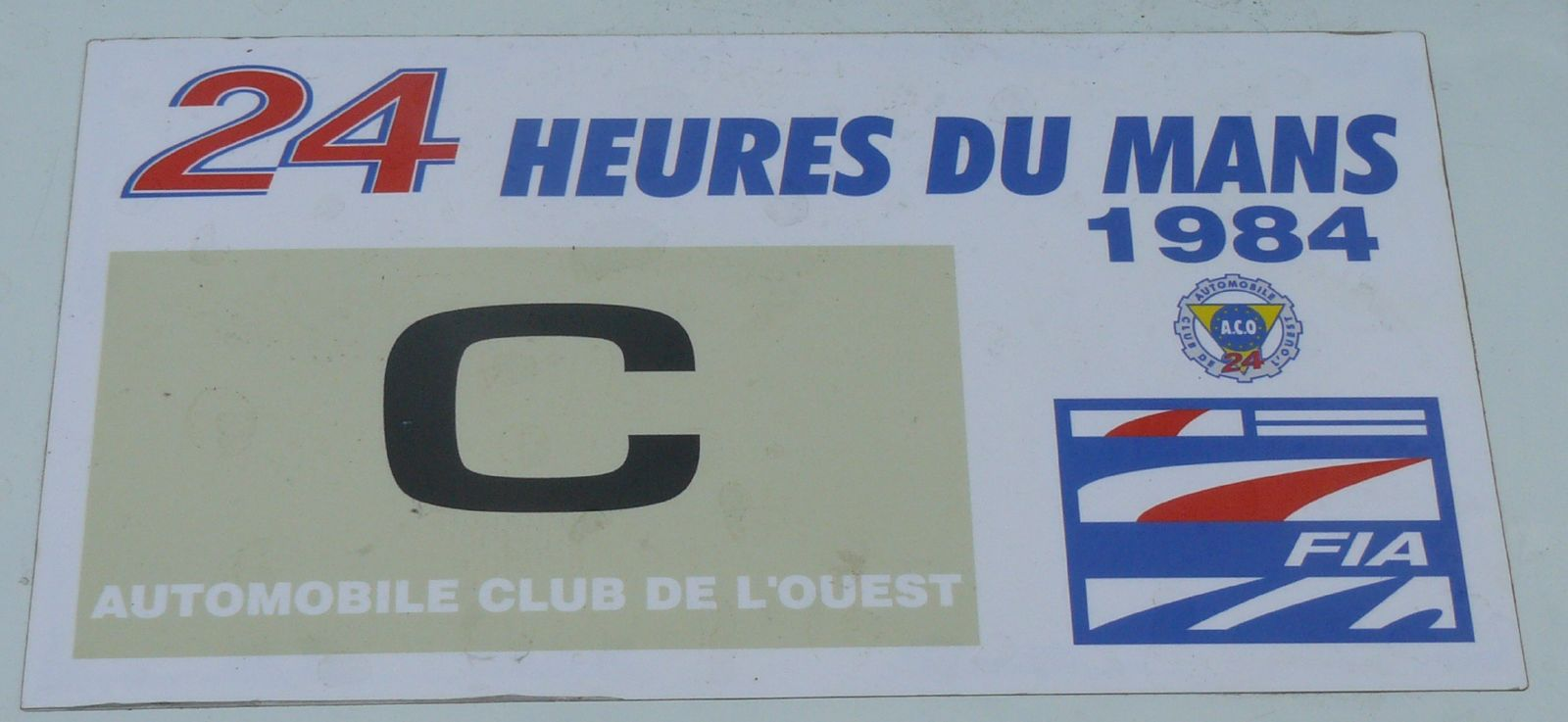
A sticker on a race car from the 1984 24 Hours of Le Mans, denoting the car is part of the Group C category.

Group C was a category of sports car racing introduced by the FIA in 1982 and continuing until 1993, with Group A for touring cars and Group B for GTs.

It was designed to replace both Group 5 special production cars (closed top touring prototypes like Porsche 935) and Group 6 two-seat racing cars (open-top sportscar prototypes like Porsche 936). Group C was used in the FIA's World Endurance Championship (1982–1985), World Sports-Prototype Championship (1986–1990), World Sportscar Championship (1991–1992) and in the European Endurance Championship (1983 only). It was also used for other sports car racing series around the globe (All Japan Sports Prototype Championship, Supercup, Interserie). The final year for the class came in 1993, thereafter being replaced by Group GT1.

Broadly similar rules were used in the North American IMSA Grand Touring Prototype series (GTP).

== History ==
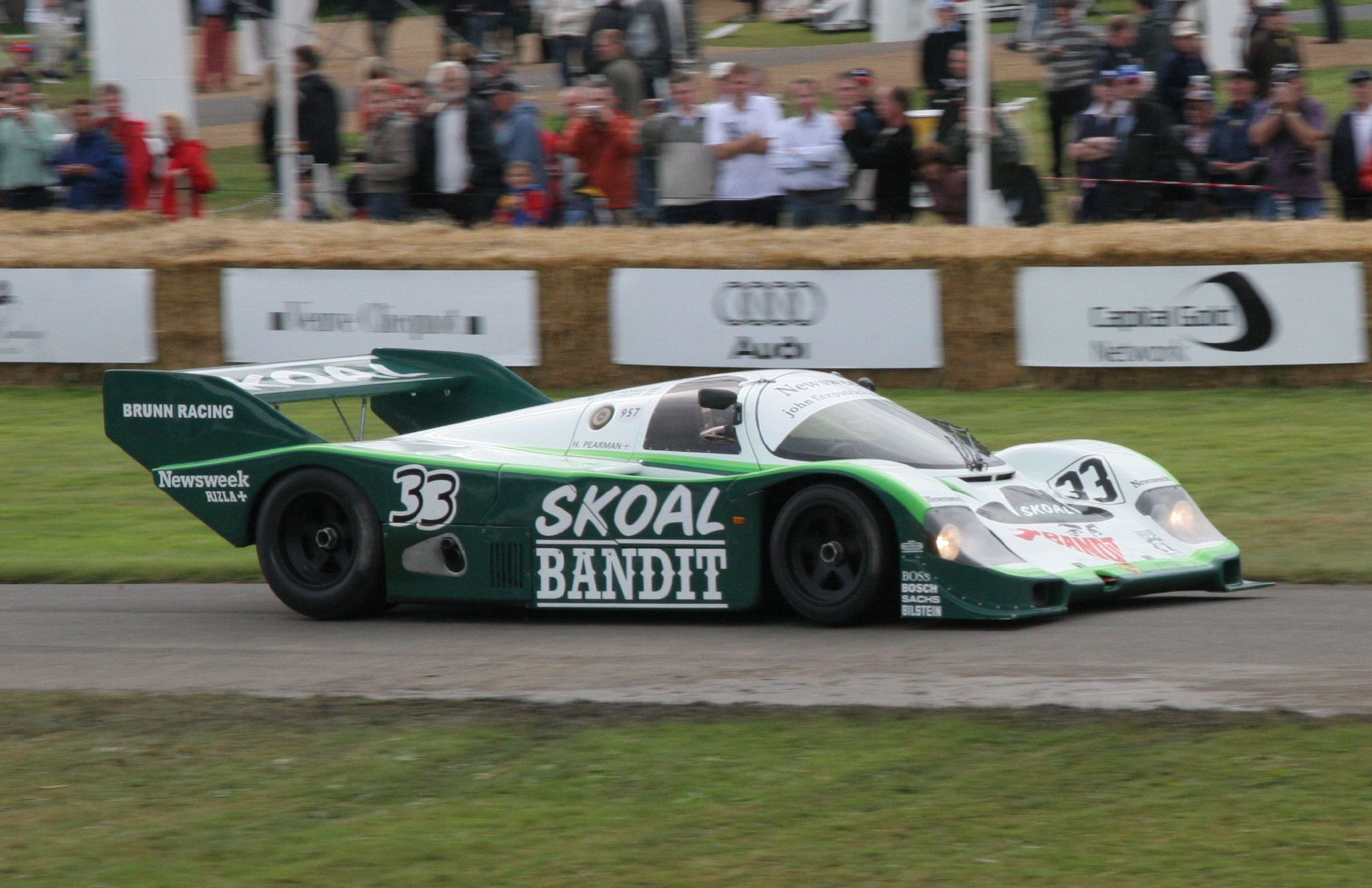
The Porsche 956 was a dominant car in its many factory and customer built forms in the early 1980s.

The roots of the Group C category lie in both FIA Group 6 and particularly in the GTP category introduced by the ACO at Le Mans in the mid-1970s. GTP was a class for roofed prototypes with certain dimensional restrictions, but instead of the more usual limits on engine capacity, it placed limits on fuel consumption. The FIA applied the same concept in its Group C rules. It limited cars to a minimum weight of 800 kg and a maximum fuel capacity of 100 litres. With competitors restricted to five refueling stops within a 1000 kilometer distance, the cars were effectively allowed 600 litres per 1000 kilometers. The FIA hoped this would prevent manufacturers from concentrating solely on engine development; in the late 1970s, a few manufacturers (especially Porsche and Lancia) had dominated sports car racing by simply increasing turbocharger boost pressure, especially in qualifying trim — the 3.2 L Porsche 935 was capable of more than 800 hp. Engines had to be from a recognized manufacturer which had cars homologated in the FIA's Group A Touring Car or Group B GT Car categories.

While the consumption requirement meant that cars needed to conserve fuel early in the race, manufacturer support for the new regulations grew steadily with each make adding to the diversity of the series. With the new rules, it was theoretically possible for large naturally aspirated engines to compete with small forced induction engines. In addition, all races were to be contested over at least 1000 km — usually lasting more than six hours — so it was possible to emphasize the "endurance" aspect of the competition as well.

Ford (with the C100) and Porsche (with the 956) were the first constructors to join the series. The traditional turbocharged boxer engine in the 956 was already tested in the 1981 version of the Group 6 936. Eventually, several other makes joined the series, including Lancia, Jaguar, Mercedes, Nissan, Toyota, Mazda and Aston Martin. Many of these also took part in the IMSA championship, as its GTP class had similar regulations.

With costs increasing, the FIA introduced a new Group C Junior class for 1983. This was intended for privateer teams and small manufacturers and it limited cars to a minimum weight of 700 kg and a maximum fuel capacity of 55 liters. With competitors limited to five refueling stops within a 1000 kilometer distance, the cars were effectively allowed 330 liters per 1000 kilometers. As in Group C, engines had to be from a recognized manufacturer which had cars homologated in Group A or Group B. Although it was originally expected that C Junior cars would use two-litre normally aspirated engines, in practice most cars used either the 3.5l BMW M1 engine or the new 3.3l Cosworth DFL, but, like in the main class, a variety of solutions was employed by each individual manufacturer. Alba with a small, lightweight turbo, Tiga, Spice and Ecurie Ecosse with Austin-Rover and later Cosworth-powered cars were among the most competitive in this class. The low cost of these cars even led to the notion of their use in national championships, such as the short-lived British BRDC C2 Championship. Group C Junior was formally renamed Group C2 for 1984.

== Rise and fall ==
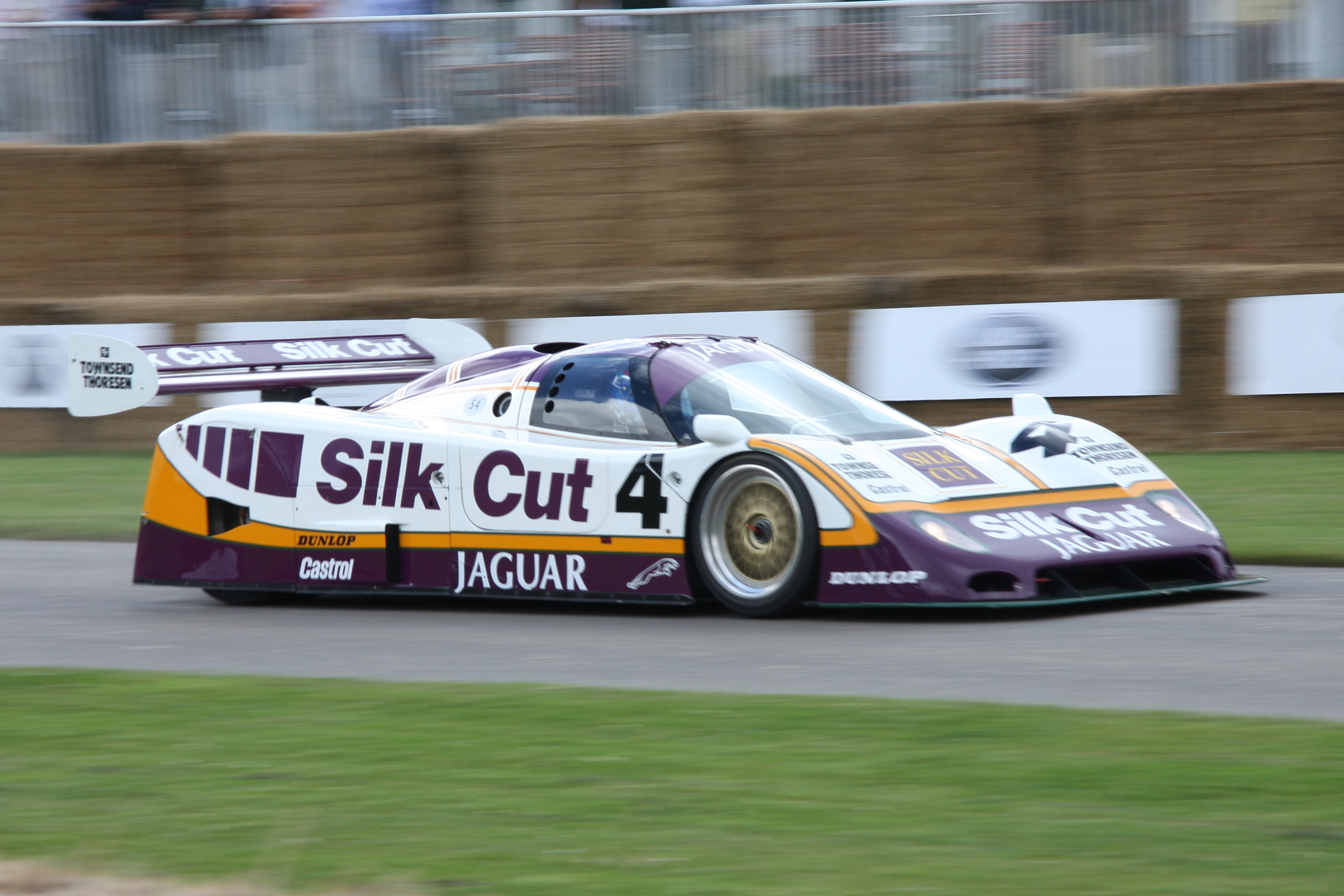
Jaguar XJR-8 at the Goodwood Festival of Speed, 2008.

By 1989, the Group C series popularity was nearly as great as Formula One. When C1 cars were found to be breaking over the 400 kilometres per hour mark at Le Mans' Mulsanne Straight — the WM-Peugeot recorded the highest 405 km/h (252 mph) during the 1988 event — the FIA revolutionized the class by attempting to turn it into a formula series to replace the C2 category (after they proved to be unreliable at endurance races). The new formula restricted the performance of cars built to the original rules (such as the Porsche 962 used by many privateers) and benefited teams using F1-sourced 3.5 L engines — these latter teams being effectively the large manufacturers alone, as the new formula cars were more expensive than the C1 cars. What followed was the quick downfall of Group C, as the new engines were unaffordable for privateer teams like Spice and ADA. A lack of entries meant the 1993 Championship was canceled before the start of the first race. However, the ACO still allowed the Group C cars to compete (albeit with restrictions) at 24 Hours of Le Mans. Nevertheless, the race still witnessed protests against the new state of affairs, as spectators placed cloth banners in fences expressing their feelings.

The 1994 24 Hours of Le Mans was the last one in which Group C cars were permitted. A new category formed especially by race organizers also saw modified Group C cars without roofs. In fact, a former C1 car disguised as a road-legal GT car which was entered in the Group GT1, the Dauer 962 Le Mans, and won the race after transmission problems by a leading Toyota 94C-V. The 962 was subsequently banned; the Toyota was later given a special dispensation to race in the Suzuka 1000km, and a few C1 racers were allowed to compete in the newly formed Japanese GT Championship — this would be its final year of competition. Many of the modified open top Group C cars continued to compete until they were crashed, broke, or retired out of competitiveness; notable among these was the Porsche WSC-95 which won the 1996 and 1997 Le Mans races, using the monocoque of the Jaguar XJR-14 and Porsche 962 mechanicals (engine, transmission, etc.).

== Group C series ==
The FIA's Group C formula was designed primarily for the World Endurance Championship which included the 24 Hours of Le Mans. However, several smaller series also adapted the Group C regulations. The Deutsche Rennsport Meisterschaft allowed Group C cars to compete alongside various other types of cars from the 1982 season until 1985, when the series was reformed as the ADAC Supercup. Under the new Supercup series, only Group C cars would be allowed to compete. This series lasted until 1989.

In Great Britain, the Thundersports championship combined a variety of cars with the C Junior (later C2) class of cars. This too was later replaced with a C2 only series known as the BRDC C2 Championship, and lasted until 1990. The European Interserie championship also allowed Group C cars to compete, although they did not use the same class structure.

In Japan, the All Japan Sports Prototype Championship was created in 1983, while the Fuji Long Distance Series also began allowing Group C cars for the first time. It was not until 1989 however that the series concentrated solely on the Group C formula. Both championships lasted until 1992, when they were cancelled along with the World Sportscar Championship.
