= List of Le Mans Prototypes =

The following are a list of Le Mans Prototypes (LMP) race cars, running today, and in the past. This does not include DPi, LMH and LMDh cars, as they appear in lists contained in their own articles.

(Note: Some car chassis may have raced in multiple LMP classes through its lifetime or through different setups by teams. These cars are listed in every class they participated in.)

Brand	Chassis	Image	Year	Applications	Notes	Source
Acura	ARX-01a		2007	LMP2	Modified from a Courage LC75	
Acura	ARX-01b		2008	LMP2		
Acura	ARX-02a		2009	LMP1		
Acura	ARX-03a		2012	LMP1		
Acura	ARX-03b		2012	LMP2 / P (US)		
ADESS	ADESS-02		2014	LMP2	Upgraded version of Lotus T128, never raced	
ADESS	ADESS-03		2015	LMP3		
ADESS	ADESS-03 Evo		2020	LMP3		
ADESS	ADESS AD25		2025	LMP3		
Alba Engineering	AR2		1993	WSC	Modified from an AR2 category C2 racer	
ALD	06		1994	LMP1	Former C2 racer, run by Stealth Engineering	
Alpa	LM		1994	LMP1	Rebadged Sauber SHS C6 chassis	
Alpine	A450		2013	LMP2	Rebranded Oreca 03 chassis	
Alpine	A450b		2014	LMP2	Rebranded Oreca 03R chassis	
Alpine	A460		2016	LMP2	Rebranded Oreca 05 chassis	
Alpine	A470		2017	LMP2	Rebranded Oreca 07 chassis	
Alpine	A480		2021	LMP1	Rebranded Rebellion R13 chassis, raced in the Hypercar class for the first two years of its existence.	
Argo Racing Cars	JM19		1993	WSC	Modified from Argo JM19 IMSA Camel Lights model	
Argo Racing Cars	WSC001		1996	WSC	Modified from incomplete Argo JM20 IMSA Camel GTP model	
Ascari	A410		2001	LMP900	Modified from Lola T92/10	
Ascari	KZR-1		2002	LMP900		
Aston Martin	AMR-One		2011	LMP1		
Audi	R8C		1999	LMGTP		
Audi	R8R		1999	LMP900		
Audi	R8		2000	LMP900; LMP1	Built by Dallara, continuously evolved until 2005.	
Audi	R10 TDI		2006	LMP1	Uses a TDI diesel engine.	
Audi	R15 TDI		2009	LMP1	Uses a TDI diesel engine	
Audi	R15 TDI Plus		2010	LMP1		
Audi	R18 TDI		2011	LMP1	Uses a TDI diesel engine.	
Audi	R18 Ultra		2012	LMP1	Upgraded, lighter version of R18 TDI	
Audi	R18 e-Tron quattro		2012	LMP1	Same as R18 Ultra but with a hybrid system powering the front wheels.	
Audi	R18 e-Tron quattro		2014	LMP1	Retains same name as 2012 model, but completely redesigned for 2014 LMP1 rules.	
Audi	R18 e-Tron quattro		2016	LMP1	Upgraded high-nose bodywork and new lithium-ion battery energy storage in place of flywheel.	
Aurus	01		2019	LMP2	Rebranded Oreca 07 chassis	
AutoExe	LMP99		1999	LMP	Derived from a Riley & Scott Mk III	
AutoExe	LMP 02		2002	LMP	Derived from a WR, fitted with a Mazda Wankel engine.	
AutoVolante	WSC Alfa Romeo		1994	WSC	Never raced	
Bailey	LMP2		2012	LMP2		
Bennett	Special		1994	WSC		
Bentley	EXP Speed 8		2001	LMGTP	Built by Racing Technologies Norfolk	
Bentley	Speed 8		2003	LMGTP	Complete redesign.	
BGN	APB-1		1998		Modified from Argo JM19	
BMW	V12 LM		1998	WSC	One car modified in 2000 by Goh and Dome	
BMW	V12 LMR		1999	LMP900		
BR Engineering	BR01		2015	LMP2	Coupe built for SMP Racing.	
BR Engineering	BR1		2018	LMP1	Joint developed with Dallara.	
BRM	P301		1997	WSC	Modified from BRM P351	
Cadillac	Northstar LMP		2000	LMP900	Designed by Riley & Scott, later upgraded to Northstar LMP01	
Cadillac	Northstar LMP02		2002	LMP900	Built by 3GR	
Cannibal			1996	WSC	Modified from an Oldsmobile Cutlass, formerly an IMSA GTS spaceframe car	
Chevron	B73		1996	WSC		
Chrysler	Patriot		1993	WSC	Built and constructed by Reynard, never raced	
Chrysler	LMP		2001	LMP900	Designed by Dallara	
CLM	P1/01		2014	LMP1		
Courage	C32		1994	LMP1	Upgraded Courage C30	
Courage	C34		1995	WSC	Modified from Courage C32	
Courage	C36		1996	WSC	Modified from Courage C32	
Courage	C41		1995	WSC		
Courage	C50		1998	WSC	Modified from Courage C41	
Courage	C51		1998	WSC	Modified from Courage C41	
Courage	C52		1999	LMP900	Modified from Courage C41. Also ran as the Nissan C52.	
Courage	C60		2000	LMP900	Evolved into the C60JX in 2002. A "Hybrid" version was raced later on	
Courage	C65		2003	LMP675; LMP2	Hybrid model in 2005	
Courage	LC70		2006	LMP1	Not only the factory, also a customer car	
Courage	LC75		2007	LMP2		
Courage	LC70E		2009	LMP1		
Consulier	Intruder		1994	WSC	Based on the Mosler Raptor	
Crawford	SSC2K		2001	LMP900		
Creation	CA06/H		2006	LMP1	A modification of the original Reynard 02S	
Creation	CA07		2007	LMP1	Designed by KW Motorsport	
Dallara	SP1		2002	LMP900	Commercial application of the Chrysler LMP	
Dallara	GC-21		2002	LMP2	Rebodied Formula Three car originally for use in the revived Fuji Grand Champion Series, saw action in Japan Le Mans Challenge	
Dallara	P217		2017	LMP2	LMP2 chassis homologated to the 2017 FIA, ACO, and IMSA regulations. Also formed the base for the Cadillac DPi-V.R in the DPi class	
Debora	LMP200		2001	WSC		
Debora	LMP201		1995	WSC		
Debora	LMP294		1994	WSC	Rebuilt from the Debora SP93	
Debora	LMP295		1995	WSC		
Debora	LMP296		1996	WSC		
Debora	LMP297		1997	WSC		
Debora	LMP299		1999	WSC		
Debora	LMP2000		2000	LMP675		
DBA	03S		2003	LMP675	Modified from Reynard 02S, created by RN Motorsport	
DeltaWing	LM12		2012	Experimental	Entered at Le Mans under Garage 56 rules.	
DeltaWing	DWC13		2013	Experimental	Coupe version raced in ALMS in P1 and P2.	
Denali			1994	WSC	Modified from Denali IMSA Camel Lights model	
Dome	S101		2001	LMP900; LMP1	Evolved into hybrid LMP1 S101Hb in 2005	
Dome	S101.5		2007	LMP1		
Dome	S102		2008	LMP1	Closed-cockpit design	
Dome	S102.5		2012	LMP1	Upgraded version of S102 by Pescarolo Sport	
Dome	Strakka-Dome S103		2014	LMP2	Only tested in 2014, race debut in 2015	
Duqueine	D08		2020	LMP3		
Duqueine	D09		2025	LMP3		
Durango	PM02		2000	LMP900	Built by GMS; Judd V10 engine badged as MG	
Embassy	WF01		2008	LMP2	Zytek V8 engine	
Epsilon Euskadi	ee1		2008	LMP1	Closed-cockpit design	
Fabcar			1994	WSC	Never raced	
Ferrari	333SP		1994	WSC	Designed by Dallara, built by Michelotto, evolved into 333SP Evo in 1998	
Gebhardt	G4/1		1998	WSC; LMP900	Modified from a Gebhardt C91 C2 racer, converted to Momo C901 WSC car	
Gibson	015S		2015	LMP2	Modified Zytek Z11SN	
Ginetta	G57 P2		2016	LMP2	Basically the P3-15 but has 30% more downforce	
Ginetta	G58		2018	LMP2		
Ginetta	G60-LT-P1		2018	LMP1		
Ginetta	G61-LT-P3		2020	LMP3	Evolution of P3-15	
Ginetta	G61-LT-P3 Evo		2025	LMP3		
Ginetta-Juno	P3-15		2015	LMP3	First LMP3 car to race, evolved into G57 P2, and subsequently G58	
GMS	LMP1		2000	LMP900		
GreenGT	H2		2013	Experimental	Hydrogen-powered, never raced	
GreenGT	LMPH2G		2018	Experimental	Hydrogen-powered, uses an ADESS-03 chassis	
GreenGT	H24		2020	Experimental	Hydrogen-powered, uses an ADESS-03 chassis	
GreenGT	H24Evo		2023	Experimental	Hydrogen-powered	
Gunnar	G99-S		2000	LMP900	Modified from a Porsche 911 GT1, never raced, modified to an IMSA GTS car	
Harrier	LR9C		1994	LMP2	Modified from road car sans roof	
Harrier	LR10		2000	LMP900		
HPD	ARX-01c		2010	LMP2	Cars badged as HPD for 2010 season, previously Acura	
HPD	ARX-01d		2011	LMP2		
HPD	ARX-01e		2011	LMP1	Car only ran in 2011 12 Hours of Sebring before retirement	
HPD	ARX-01g		2011	LMP2		
HPD	ARX-03a		2012	LMP1		
HPD	ARX-03b		2012	LMP2		
HPD	ARX-03c		2013	LMP1	Revised version of ARX-03a	
HPD	ARX-04b		2015	LMP2	Closed-cockpit design	
Huffaker			1993	WSC	Modified from Kudzu DG-1 IMSA Camel Lights model, raced once, modified to a Kudzu DG-2	
Hawk Mandeville	MD3R		1994	WSC		
Hawk Mandeville	C-8		1996	WSC		
Harvey-Mitchell	HMR-01		1998	WSC		
Kopf Keiler	K2		1997	WSC	Modified from a never-raced Chevron B71	
Kremer	K8 Spyder		1994	WSC	Modified from Porsche 962	
Kudzu	DG-2		1993	WSC	Modified from Kudzu DG-2 IMSA Camel Lights model	
Kudzu	DG-3		1994	WSC	Modified from Kudzu DG-3 IMSA Camel Lights model	
Kudzu	DLM		1996	WSC	3-rotor	
Kudzu	DLM-4		1997	WSC	4-rotor	
Kudzu	DLY		1998	WSC	Three major iterations, debut ('98), '99 longtail, '00 major revision	
Lavaggi	LS1		2006	LMP1		
Ligier	JS P2		2014	LMP2	Coupe	
Ligier	JS P3		2015	LMP3	Debuted in September 2015	
Ligier	JS P217		2017	LMP2	LMP2 chassis homologated to the 2017 FIA, ACO, and IMSA regulations. Also formed the base for the Nissan Onroak DPi in the DPi class.	
Ligier	JS P4		2018	LMP4	Single-make prototype developed for the Ligier European series	
Ligier	JS P320		2020	LMP3	Built to new 2020 LMP3 Regulations, evolution of Ligier JS P3	
Ligier	JS P325		2025	LMP3		
Lister	Storm LMP		2003	LMP900; LMP1	Evolved into Storm LMP Hybrid in 2005	
Lola	B98/10		1998	WSC; LMP		
Lola	B2K/10		2000	LMP900	First chassis with diesel power at Le Mans - Taurus Sports Racing w/ Caterpillar power, 2004	
Lola	B2K/40		2000	LMP675		
Lola	B01/60		2001	LMP675	Commercial application of the MG-Lola EX257	
Lola	B05/40		2005	LMP2	Evolved into Lola B07/40 in 2007	
Lola	B06/10		2006	LMP1	LMP1 evolution of the B05/40	
Lola	B08/80		2008	LMP1; LMP2	Closed-cockpit concept; raced in LMP1 in the 2011 American Le Mans Series season with an evolved B09/86 chassis as a B11/66.	
Lola	B08/60		2008	LMP1	Closed-cockpit concept	
Lola	B09/60		2009	LMP1	Closed-cockpit prototype; an evolved B08/60 chassis used by Drayson Racing in the 2009 and 2010 American Le Mans Series, 2009 Asian Le Mans Series, and 2010 24 Hours of Le Mans	
Lola	Aston Martin B09/60		2009	LMP1	Closed-cockpit concept, developed by Aston Martin Racing and Prodrive	
Lola	B11/40		2011	LMP2		
Lola	B12/60		2012	LMP1		
Lola	B12/80		2012	LMP2		
Lotus	Elise GT1		1997	LMGTP	Originally a GT1 car	
Lotus	T128		2013	LMP2	Codeveloped by ADESS AG and Kodewa racing team	
Lucchini Engineering	LMP/93		1993	LMP		
Lucchini Engineering	LMP2/04		2004	LMP2		
Lucchini Engineering	LMP2/08		2008	LMP2		
Magnum	SC205		1996	WSC		
Mantac	WSC		1993	WSC	Modified from Mantac GTP IMSA Camel Lights racer	
Matrix	MXP-1		1997	WSC	Modified from Nissan NPT-90	
Mazda	SDR-14		2014	LMP2	Modified from Lola B12/80, uses a 2.2L SkyActiv Diesel engine	
McNeil Engineering	Lola 981		1998		Modified from Lola T92/10	
Mercedes-Benz	CLR		1999	LMGTP		
MG	EX257		2001	LMP675	Designed by Lola (B01/60)	
MG	EX264		2005	LMP2	Evolved from Lola B05/40, built by RML using EX257 parts; evolved into EX265 in 2008	
MG	EX265C		2008	LMP2	Lola B08/80 chassis with EX264 parts	
Morgan	LMP2		2012	LMP2	Rebadged version of OAK-Pescarolo 01	
Morgan	LMP2 Evo		2015	LMP2	Evolution of Morgan LMP2	
Nasamax	DM139		2004	WSC; LMP900	Modified from Reynard 01Q; Runs on bio-ethanol	
Nissan	R391		1999	LMP900		
Nissan	ZEOD RC		2014	Experimental	Also entered under Garage 56 rules. First car to lap the Circuit de la Sarthe in racing conditions on electric power alone.	
Nissan	GT-R LM Nismo		2015	LMP1	Radical prototype utilising a front-mounted engine driving the front wheels, and designed to have a mechanical flywheel hybrid system which was never used.	
Norma Auto Concept	M14		1995	WSC		
Norma Auto Concept	M2000		2000	LMP900		
Norma Auto Concept	M200P		2010	LMP2		
Norma Auto Concept	M30		2017	LMP3		
OAK-Pescarolo	01		2011	LMP1; LMP2	Modified version of Pescarolo 01 built by OAK Racing. P2 version rebadged as Morgan in 2012.	
Oreca	01		2009	LMP1		
Oreca	FLM09		2009	FLM	Based on the Courage LC75	
Oreca	03		2011	LMP2		
Oreca	03R		2014	LMP2	modified Oreca 03	
Oreca	05		2015	LMP2	Coupe	
Oreca	07		2017	LMP2	LMP2 chassis homologated to the 2017 FIA, ACO, and IMSA regulations. Also formed the base for the Acura ARX-05 in the DPi class	
Oscar	SK93		2006	LMP1	Rebodied single seater, Toyota 3S-GTE powered	
Oscar	KK-LM		2006	LMP2	Rebodied single seater, later Honda K20K powered	
Oscar	SK5.2		1994	RS/LMP2	Rebodied single seater, Mazda 13B powered	
Osella	PA20		1996	WSC	Modified from a Group CN Osella PA20	
Panoz	LMP-1 Roadster-S		1999	LMP900	Front-engined, modified into LMP01 Evo in 2002	
Panoz	LMP07		2001	LMP900	Front-engined	
Pegasus	WSC		1993	WSC	Modified from spaceframe Lotus Esprit IMSA GTS racer	
Pegasus	NPTI		1996	WSC	Modified from Nissan NPT-90	
Pescarolo	C60		2004	LMP900; LMP1	Modified from Courage C60, evolved into C60H in 2005	
Pescarolo	01		2007	LMP1; LMP2	"Evo" model introduced in 2009	
Pescarolo	02		2014	CN2	Built by Sora Composites; Was a candidate to LMP3	
Pescarolo	03		2012	LMP1	Based on the failed Aston Martin AMR-One, fitted with Judd engine.	
Pescarolo	04-LM		2017	Below LMP3		
Peugeot	908 HDi FAP		2007	LMP1		
Peugeot	908		2011	LMP1	Hybrid version tested before Peugeot's withdrawal from prototype racing.	
Picchio Racing Cars	MB1		1999	SR1		
Picchio Racing Cars	SR2		1999	SR2		
Pilbeam Racing Designs	MP84		2000	LMP675		
Pilbeam Racing Designs	MP91		2003	LMP675	Evolved from Pilbeam MP84	
Pilbeam Racing Designs	MP93		2005	LMP2		
Pilbeam Racing Designs	MP100		2014	LMP2	Heavily upgraded version of the MP93, only raced in South African local events	
Phoenix	JG3		1994	WSC	Never raced	
Porsche	962 GTi		1994	LMP1	Formerly Richard Lloyd Racingbuilt Group C, run by ADA Engineering	
Porsche	LMP1-98		1998	LMP	A factory-backed evolution of the former TWR WSC-95	
Porsche	LMP2000 (9R3)		2000	LMP900	Never raced	
Porsche	RS Spyder (9R6)		2006	LMP2	"Evo" model introduced in 2007	
Porsche	919 Hybrid		2014	LMP1	Upgraded in 2015, 2016, and 2017. Modified to unrestricted 919 Evo in 2018.	
Promec	PJ199		2001	LMP900		
ProTran	RS06/H		2006	LMP1	Modified from Reynard 2KQ	
R&M	SR-01		2002	LMP1		
Radical	SR9		2006	LMP2		
Radical	SR10		2012	LMP1 LMP2		
Rebellion	R-One		2014	LMP1	Built by Oreca. Design evolved into Oreca 05 LMP2 chassis	
Rebellion	R13		2018	LMP1	Built by Oreca. Evolution based on Oreca 07 LMP2 chassis, also competed as a "grandfathered" LMP1 car in the Hypercar class as the Alpine A480	
Reynard	2KQ		2000	LMP900; LMP675		
Reynard	01Q		2001	LMP900; LMP675	An upgrade of the 2KQ	
Reynard	02S		2002	LMP675	Never completed, modified by multiple manufacturers later	
Riley & Scott	Mk III		1996	WSC; LMP900	Evolved into Mk III/2	
Riley & Scott	Mk III C		2001	LMP900		
Riley & Scott	Mk XIV		2007	LMP1	Customer car, none sold	
Sarta Project	624		1999		Never raced	
Riley-Ave Motorsports	AR-2		2016	LMP3	Debuted in 2017 IMSA Prototype Challenge (was set to debut before in the 2016 European Le Mans Series season).	
Riley/Multimatic	Mk. 30		2017	LMP2	LMP2 chassis homologated to 2017 FIA, ACO, and IMSA regulations. Also formed the base for the Mazda RT24-P in the DPi class.	
Shelby American	LR-93		1993	WSC	Modified from a Shelby Can-Am model	
SNBE Snobeck	LM01		2000			
Spice Engineering	WSC94		1994	WSC		
Spice Engineering	AK93		1994	WSC	Modified from AK93 IMSA Camel Lights racer	
Spice Engineering	DR-3		1994	WSC		
Spice Engineering	SE89		1993	WSC	Modified from SE89 IMSA Camel Lights/C2 racer	
Spice Engineering	SE90		1993	WSC	Modified from SE90 IMSA Camel Lights/C2 racer	
Spice Engineering	HC94		1994	WSC	Modified from AK93 WSC	
Spice Engineering	BDG-02		1995	WSC	Modified from HC94	
Tampolli	RTA-01		2004	LMP2		
Tampolli	RTA-98		1998	WSC		
Tampolli	RTA-2001		2001	LMP675/SR2		
Tiga Race Cars	GT286 Spyder		1994	WSC	Modified from Tiga GT286 IMSA Camel Lights model	
Tiga Race Cars	FJ94		1994	WSC	Modified from Tiga GT287 IMSA Camel Lights model	
Tiga Race Cars	DBIV		1994	WSC	Modified from Tiga GT286 IMSA Camel Lights model	
Tiga Race Cars	LM214		2015	LMP2	Modified from Embassy WF01, never raced	
Toyota	94C-V		1994	LMP1	Updated Toyota 93C-V	
Toyota	TOM's Toyota LMP		1996	LMP900	Built by TOM's Toyota, never raced	
Toyota	TS030 Hybrid (TS030)		2012	LMP1		
Toyota	TS040 Hybrid (TS040)		2014	LMP1	TS030's 3.4-litre V8 enlarged to 3.7 litres	
Toyota	TS050 Hybrid (TS050)		2016	LMP1	New 2.4-litre twin-turbo V6 and lithium-ion batteries replace the TS040's 3.7-litre naturally aspirated V8 and supercapacitor energy store.	
TWR	WSC-95		1995	WSC	Modified from Jaguar XJR-14, semi-backed by Porsche	
WR	LM93		1993	LMP; LMP2	Peugeot powered	
WR	LM94		1995	LMP2	Peugeot powered, evolved into LM96 in 1996	
WR	LMP 98		1998	LMP1; SR1	Peugeot powered, evolved into LMP 99 in 1999	
WR	LMP		2000	LMP675	Evolved into LM 2001 in 2001 and LMP-02 in 2002	
WR	LMP2003		2003	LMP675	Evolved into LMP2004 in 2004	
WR	LMP2008		2008	LMP2	Zytek powered	
Zulltec	CZ-01		2006	LMP2	Never raced	
Zytek	04S		2004	LMP900; LMP675	Modified from Reynard 02S	
Zytek	06S		2006	LMP1	Hybrid model of 04S	
Zytek	07S		2007	LMP1; LMP2		
Zytek	GZ09S		2009	LMP1; LMP2	Co-developed by Ginetta Cars, hybrid model named the GZ09HS.	
Zytek	Z11SN		2011	LMP2		
