= Harrier LR10 =

British race car

- Category: Le Mans Prototype
- Designer: Lester Ray
- Production: 1999
- Predecessor: Harrier LR9C

Technical specifications
- Chassis: Steel tube frame
- Suspension: Double wishbone push-rod activated coil springs over shock absorbers, anti-roll bar
- Engine: Porsche 3,800 cc (231.9 cu in) F6 twin turbocharged, rear mid-mounted
- Transmission: Hewland 6-speed sequential manual
- Tyres: Goodyear

Competition history
- Notable drivers: (United Kingdom) Gary Ayles; (United Kingdom) Ben Collins; (Netherlands) Michael Vergers
- Debut: Circuit de la Sarthe 2000
Entries	Races	Wins	Podiums
3	1	0	0

The Harrier LR10 is a sports prototype race car designed by Lester Ray and built by Harrier Cars. Built to succeed the Harrier LR9C platform of grand tourer-style race cars, the LR10 was accepted as an entrant to the 2000 24 Hours of Le Mans but was withdrawn during testing. The car attempted three races in its history but never completed a full race distance.

== History ==
Due to a naming rights dispute between Ford, Lester Ray, and Harrier owner Richard Austin, the LR9C was retired at the end of the 1998 British GT Championship. After Austin sold the company and took lead designer Phil Bourne to build the Sintura S99, Harrier began development of a successor named the LR10. Built as a Le Mans Prototype with aerodynamic assistance from MIRA in Warwickshire, the resulting open-top race car was powered by a twin turbocharged 3.8L Porsche flat six engine. After an initial shakedown at Goodwood Circuit with driver Thomas Erdos, the car appeared on the entry list for the 2000 24 Hours of Le Mans under the entrant Gérard MacQuillan. After running successfully during official pre-race testing with driver Gary Ayles, the car was later withdrawn and did not race.

After withdrawing from Le Mans, the LR10 appeared on the entry list for the seventh round of the 2000 SportsRacing World Cup at Donnington Park. Entered by Harrier with drivers Ben Collins, Michael Vergers, and Richard Jones, the car qualified twelfth overall and retired on the first lap with alternator issues. A final race attempt was made at the penultimate round at Magny-Cours, where the car received a grid slot without setting a qualifying time but failed to start due to an engine fire. After this attempt, the car never appeared in active competition again.

Notably, despite entering competition in 2000 as an open-top sports prototype, an un-raced closed-top GT1 chassis was built. This chassis was fitted with GT1 and Privilege Insurance British GT stickers, indicating that the car's intended debut may have been the 1999 British GT Championship. This would have placed the LR10 in direct competition with the Sintura S99 and the company's former leaders.
