= Courage C36 =

Racing automobile

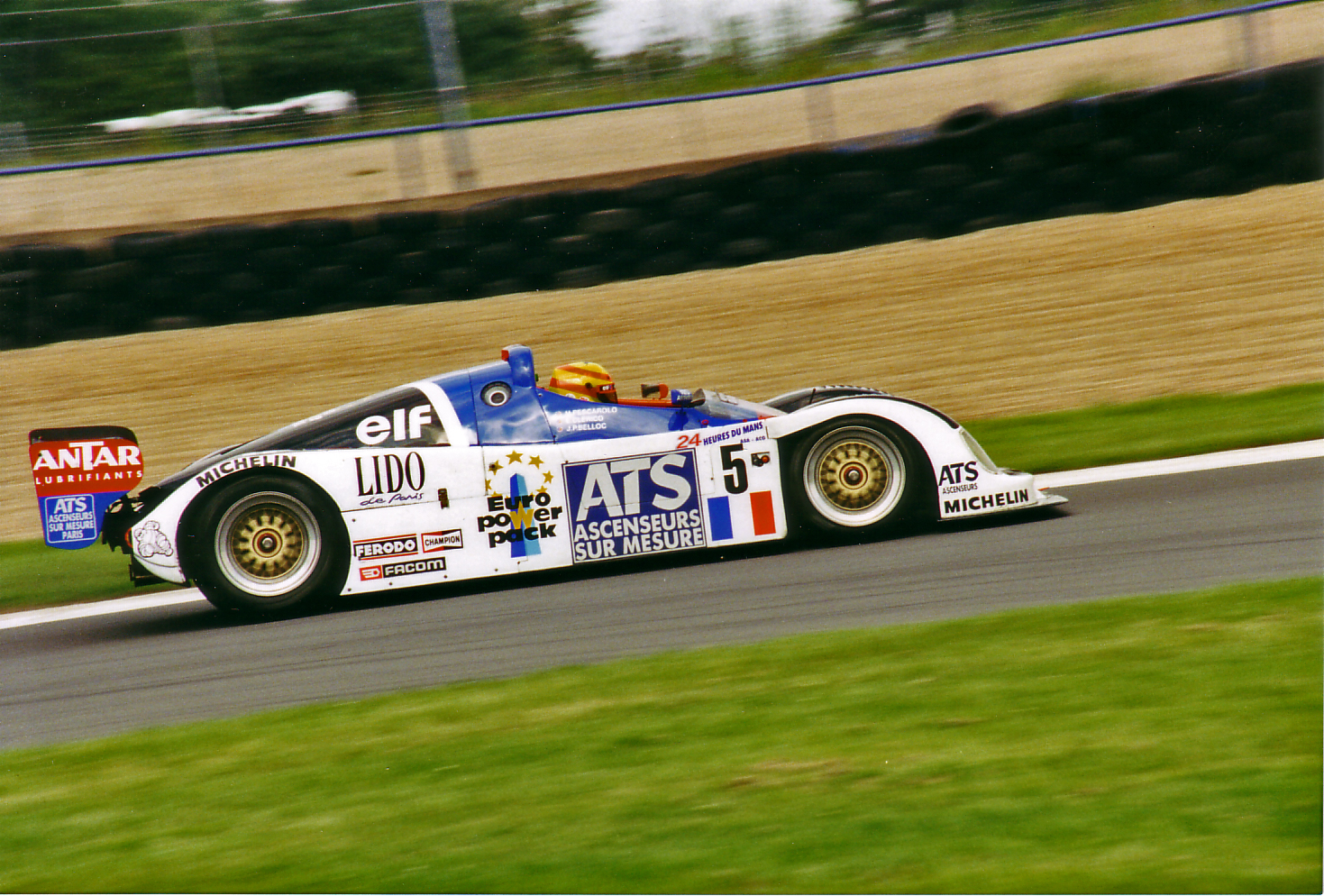
Courage C36

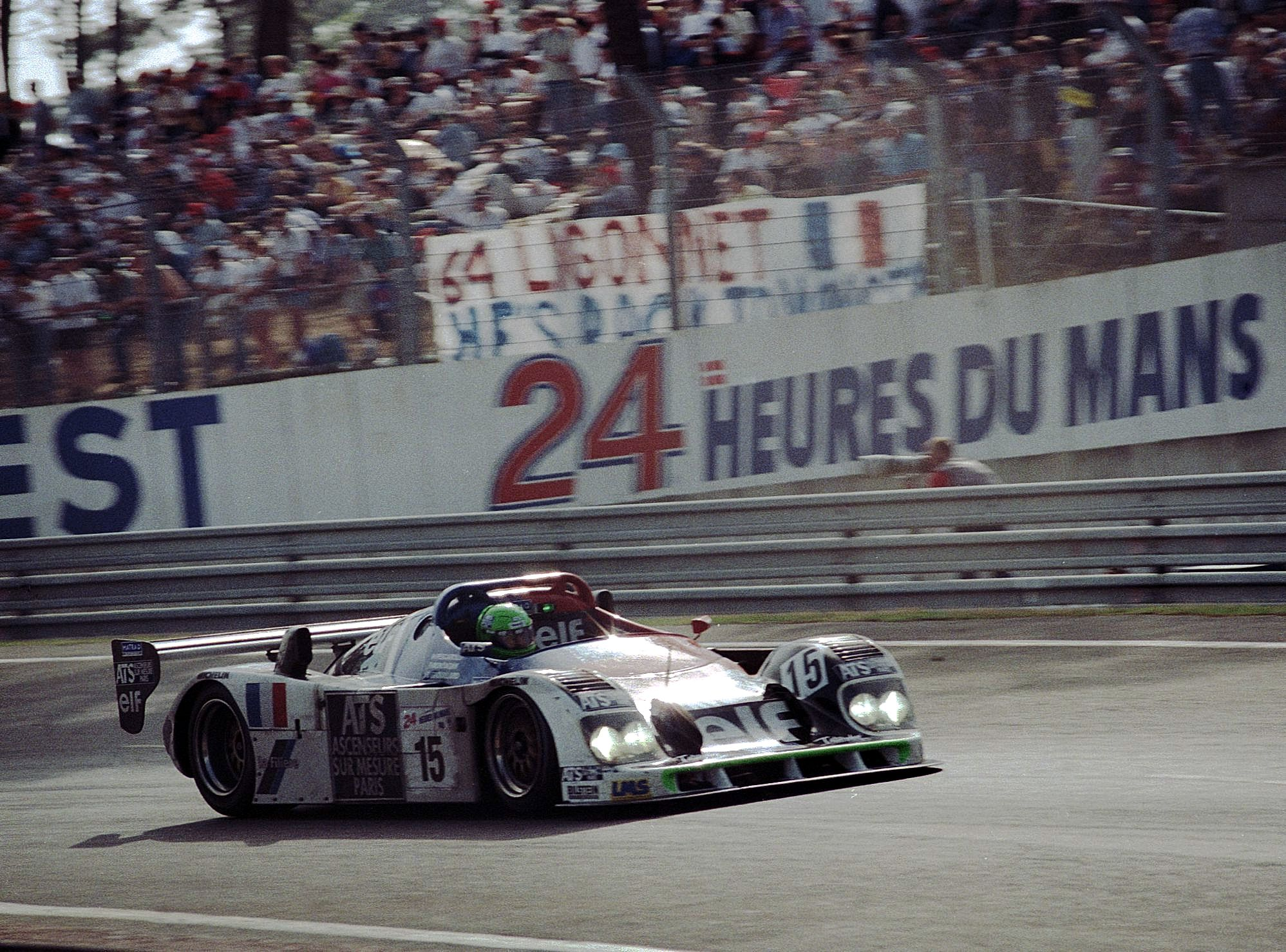
Henri Pescarolo in the Courage C36 at the 1998 Le Mans 24 Hours

The Courage C36 was a Le Mans Prototype, designed, developed, and built by Courage Compétition team, to compete in sports car racing from 1996 to 1998. It is powered by a 3.0 L (180 cu in) 700 hp (520 kW) Porsche flat-six engine. Its best result was a 3rd-place finish at the 1997 FIA Sportscar Championship race at Zolder.

== Development history ==
The Courage C36 was the logical further development of the Courage C34, which was successfully used in the 1995 24-hour race at Le Mans. With the C36, the Courage technicians began to replace the wealth of Porsche components previously used with their own designs. The C36 got a new chassis and body, only the 6-cylinder Porsche turbo engine was identical to that of the C34.

== Racing history ==
For the 1996 24-hour race, Courage gave a C36 to the French racing team La Filière Elf and fielded two works cars itself. The Filière-C36, driven by Henri Pescarolo, Franck Lagorce, and Emmanuel Collard, finished seventh overall and second in the LMP-1 class after 24 hours. One of the two factory C36s, in which Mario Andretti was one of the drivers, finished 13th overall and third in the LMP-1 class.

In 1997, three C36s competed in Le Mans again, although Courage had once again built a new vehicle with the C41. Again the Filière car was the best-placed C36 with a seventh place.

In 1998 only one C36 was running on the Sarthe. Courage had severed its association with Porsche and equipped the new Courage C52 with a Nissan engine. At its last Le Mans appearance, the C36 finished 15th overall.
