= Spice AK93 =

Sports prototype race car

- Category: WSC

Technical specifications
- Chassis: Carbon fiber monocoque, carbon fiber bodywork
- Suspension: Double wishbones, push-rod actuated coil springs over shock absorbers, anti-roll bar
- Engine: Acura C30B 3.0 L (183.1 cu in) 60° V6, naturally-aspirated, mid-engined
- Transmission: Hewland DGB 5-speed manual
- Power: 440 hp (330 kW) @ 8000 rpm 270 lb⋅ft (370 N⋅m) @ 6000 rpm
- Weight: 1,984 lb (900 kg)

Competition history

The Spice AK93 was a sports prototype race car, designed, developed, and built by British manufacturer Spice Engineering, for sports car racing, specifically the newly codified World Sports Car regulations, in 1993.
