= American Le Mans Series =

Auto racing championship in the United States

- Country: United States; Canada
- Inaugural season: 1999
- Folded: 2013
- Fate: Merged with the Rolex Sports Car Series to form the IMSA SportsCar Championship
- Prototype classes: P1, P2, PC
- GT classes: GT, GTC
- Drivers: Varies over season
- Teams: Varies over season
- Tire suppliers: Michelin, Dunlop, Falken, Yokohama, Bridgestone
- Last Drivers' champion: LMP1: Klaus Graf & Lucas Luhr; GT: Jan Magnussen & Antonio García; LMP2: Scott Tucker; LMPC: Mike Guasch; GTC: Cooper MacNeil & Jeroen Bleekemolen
- Last Makes' champion: LMP1: HPD-Honda; GT: Chevrolet
- Last Teams' champion: LMP1: Muscle Milk Pickett Racing; GT: Corvette Racing; LMP2: Level 5 Motorsports; LMPC: CORE Autosport; GTC: Flying Lizard Motorsports
- Official website: http://www.alms.com

The American Le Mans Series (ALMS) was a sports car racing series based in the United States and Canada. It consisted of a series of endurance and sprint races, and was created in the spirit of the 24 Hours of Le Mans.

The American Le Mans' headquarters was in Braselton, Georgia, adjacent to Road Atlanta.

In 2014, the series merged with the Grand-Am Rolex Sports Car Series to form the IMSA SportsCar Championship.

== History ==
The series was created by Braselton, Georgia-based businessman Don Panoz and ran its first season in 1999. Panoz created a partnership with the Automobile Club de l'Ouest (ACO), the organizers of the 24 Hours of Le Mans, to begin a 10-hour race in the spirit of Le Mans, dubbed the Petit Le Mans. The inaugural Petit Le Mans took place in 1998 as a part of the Professional SportsCar Racing series, in which Panoz was an investor. For 1999, the series changed its name to the American Le Mans Series, and adopted the ACO's rulebook.

The partnership with the ACO allowed ALMS teams to earn automatic entries in the Le Mans 24 Hours. This was a practice that began with the inaugural Petit Le Mans, a practice that continues today, where 1st and 2nd place teams in each class earn entries to the next year's 24 Hours. The ALMS race at Adelaide in 2000 also received automatic entries. Invitations were extended to the series champions beginning in 2003, for the 2004 race. The ACO has always given high consideration to teams competing in ALMS races, and many ALMS teams have seen success in the 24 Hours.

Old ALMS Logo.

The series began with eight races in 1999, beginning with the 12 Hours of Sebring, and ending at Las Vegas Motor Speedway. The schedule expanded to 12 races in 2000, including two races in Europe, and one in Australia. In subsequent years, the European races disappeared, with the creation of the short-lived European Le Mans Series, and later the Le Mans Series. The series also began to move away from the rovals, road courses in the infield of large superspeedways, at Charlotte Motor Speedway, Las Vegas, and Texas Motor Speedway. In its later years, the series visited more temporary street courses, many in conjunction with the Indy Racing League, at cities such as St. Petersburg, Florida and Long Beach, California. The series raced at Mazda Raceway Laguna Seca, Mosport, Road Atlanta and Sebring in every year of its existence. From 2011 until the series folded, ALMS competed on a street circuit through the Inner Harbor coinciding with the Grand Prix of Baltimore, Maryland over the US Labor Day weekend.

The series was the first motorsport racing series in North America to be recognized by the United States Environmental Protection Agency (the EPA), the United States Department of Energy and the Society of Automotive Engineers (SAE International) as a "Green Racing Series", and held an all-new series implemented on series races dedicated to the environment by holding their first-ever Green Challenge during the 2008 Petit Le Mans and would continue this at least up to the entire 2009 season.

In 2010 the American Le Mans Series signed its first title sponsorship agreement, with Tequila Patrón becoming a presenting sponsor for three seasons.

On September 5, 2012, the series announced that they would fully merge in 2014 with Grand-Am Road Racing under the banner of the TUDOR United SportsCar Championship, with the International Motor Sports Association.

== Overview ==
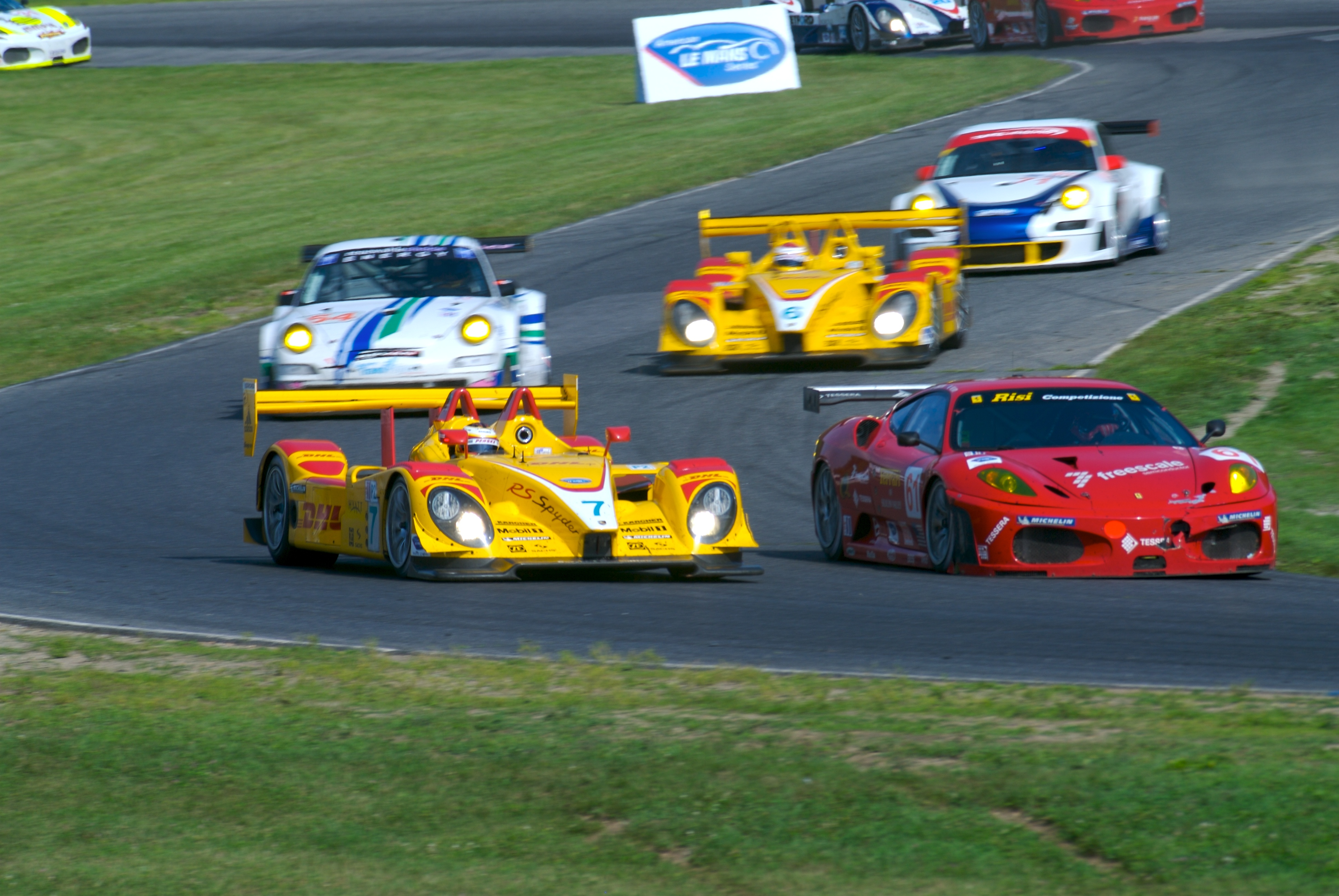
Northeast Grand Prix 2007

The American Le Mans Series used essentially the same rules as the 24 Hours of Le Mans. Like the 24 Hours of Le Mans, there were three primary classes, though there were two extra "Challenge classes" using standardized cars. Purpose-built race cars with closed fenders competed in the Prototype classes P1, P2, and PC (Prototype-Challenge) and modified production sports cars competed in the Grand Touring classes GT (GTE-Pro and GTE-Am combined, formerly GT2) along with GT-Challenge or GTC. The former GT1 category was abandoned after 2009 season. In 2012, the "Le Mans" (LM) was dropped from the names of the prototype categories.

Each car is driven by multiple drivers (2 or 3, depending on the length of the race), and all cars compete together simultaneously. P1 generally contains factory teams while P2 contains privateer teams. In ACO-sanctioned racing all of the drivers are professional in GTE-PRO, while in GTE-Am, 1 or 2 amateurs are allowed to race with a professional driver in support. However, since ALMS uses only one GTE category and combines the PRO/AM classes, there are no limitations for drivers.

The two "Challenge" classes were formula-based, and were designed for privateers or rookies to have an easier time entering the series. The Challenge classes used the Oreca FLM09 (P) and the Porsche 911 GT3 Cup (GT), though there were reports that the ACO would open the Challenge class to other manufacturers in 2013 or later.

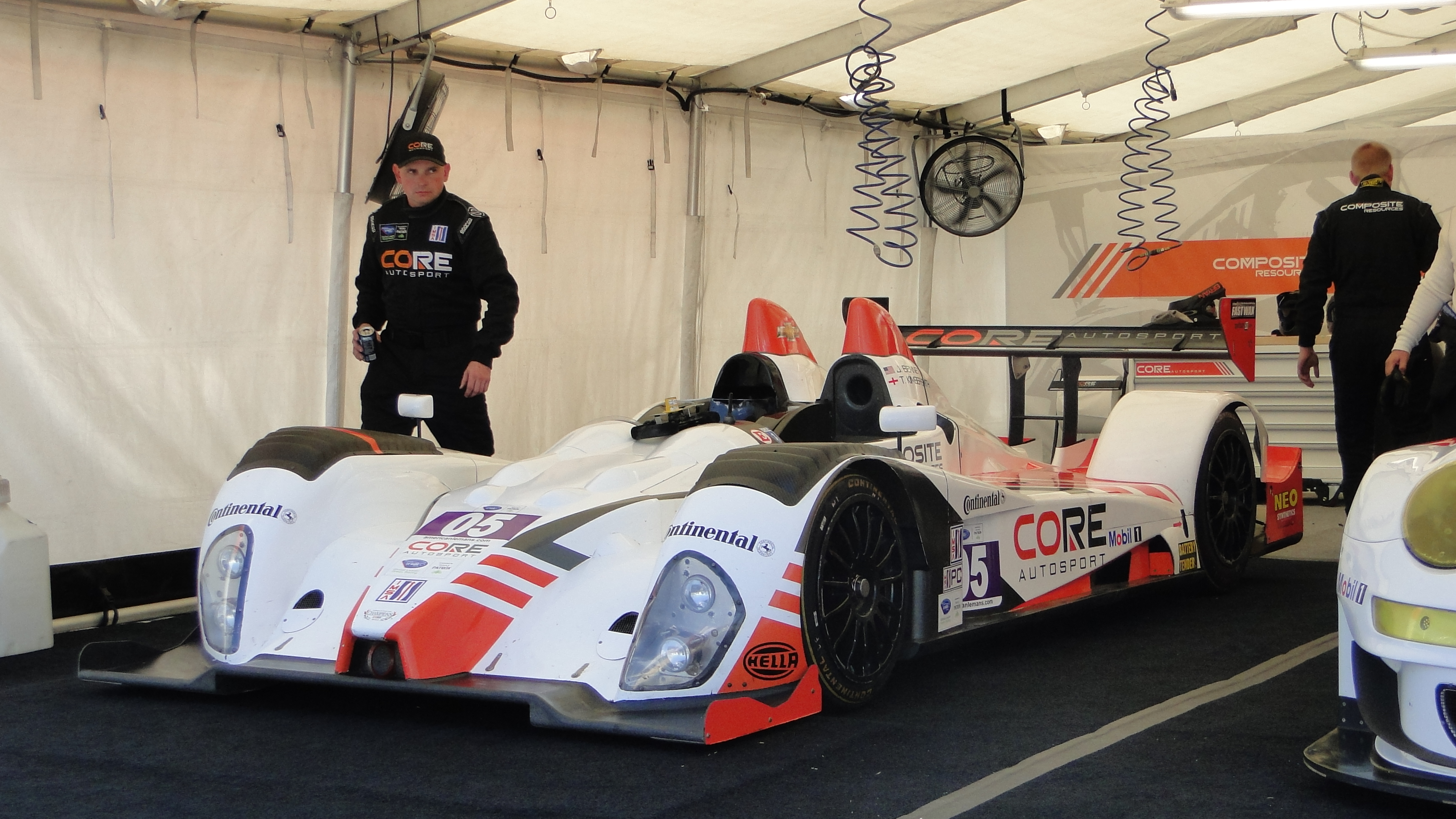
ALMS Prototype Challenge car

The team points champions and runners-up in each class at the end of the season received an automatic invitation to the next year's 24 Hours of Le Mans.

== Michelin Green X Challenge ==
In January 2008, the American Le Mans Series announced it would hold its first "Green Challenge" competition during Petit Le Mans at Road Atlanta in October, ahead of the Challenge being implemented at all ALMS races during the 2009 season. In conjunction with the Department of Energy, the Environmental Protection Agency, Environment Canada and SAE International, the Series unveiled the Green Challenge's rules and regulations. Two class leading vehicles ran low CO_{2} or green engines during the 2008 season – the GT1 Chevrolet Corvette C6.R with an E85 cellulosic ethanol powered 7.0 litre V8 and the LMP1 Audi R10 TDI with a 5.5 litre turbodiesel V12. Currently, the Michelin Green X Challenge awards invitations to the 24 Hours of Le Mans for the 1st and 2nd-place winners in the Prototype and GT categories for the entire season.

The Challenge measures "Green" (based on fuel-type and other factors influencing emissions), "Speed" (overall speed), and "Efficiency" (based on fuel-economy). A formula is used to produce a score based on the three categories. The car with the lowest score at the end of the race wins the Challenge for that race.

== Television ==
The series' first season in 1999 was covered by NBC and CNBC. Since 2000 Speed Channel broadcast the majority of ALMS races, including the 12 Hours of Sebring and Petit Le Mans, while some of the series' other races were broadcast on ABC, NBC and CBS. For the 2012 season, all races were webcast on ESPN3.com. The Long Beach Grand Prix, Northeast Grand Prix at Lime Rock, and Grand Prix of Mosport were broadcast live on ESPN2, while the ALMS at Monterey, Road Race Showcase at Road America and ALMS at VIR had delayed highlights on the same channel. The Mid-Ohio Sports Car Challenge was broadcast live on ABC, while the 12 Hours of Sebring, Baltimore Grand Prix, and Petit Le Mans had delayed highlights on the same network.

In 2013, Speed Channel reacquired broadcasting right to 12 Hours of Sebring and Petit Le Mans; the rest of the races were broadcast on ESPN2 and ABC with webcast on ESPN3.com.

== See also ==
- European Le Mans Series (current)
- 2001 European Le Mans Series
- Radio Le Mans
- List of Le Mans Prototypes
