= Tampolli RTA-2001 =

Sports prototype race car

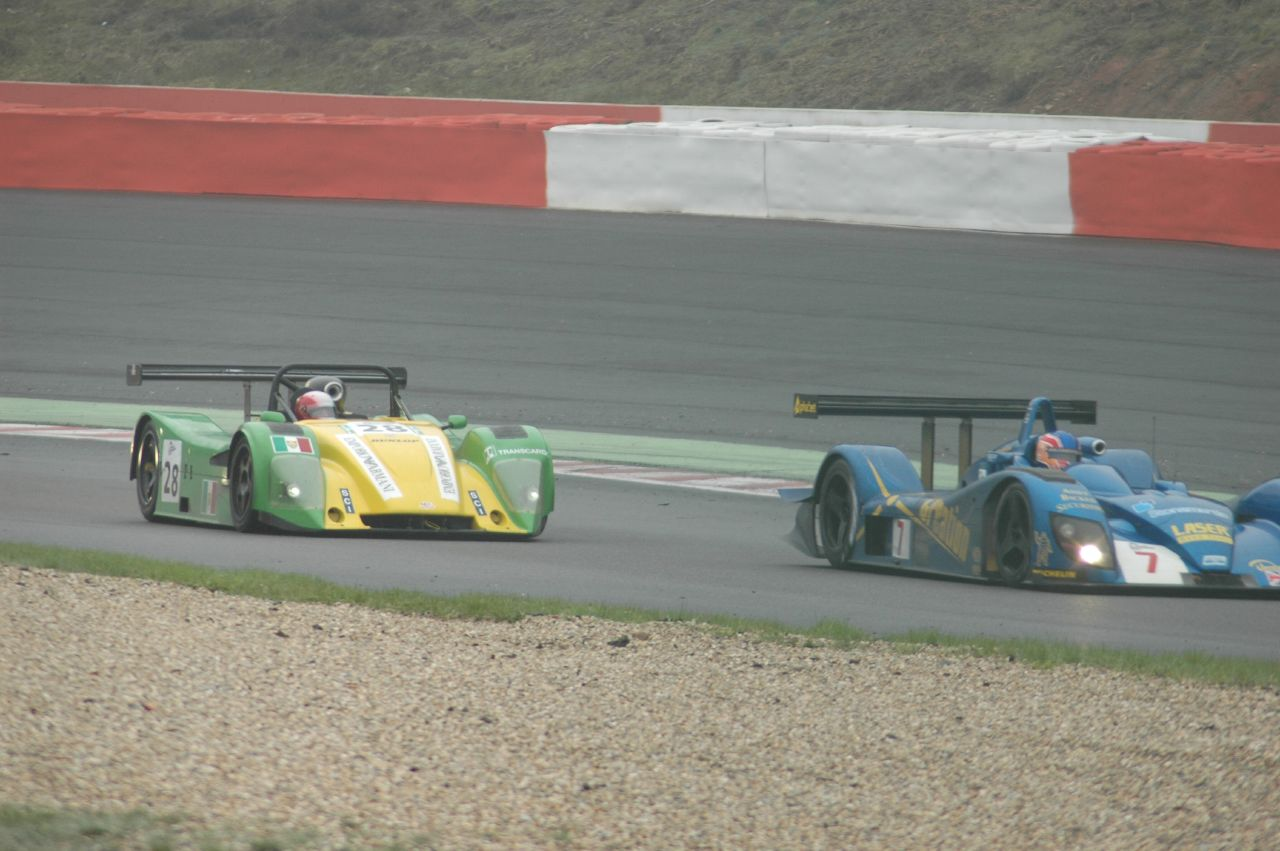
- Category: LMP675/SR2

Technical specifications
- Chassis: Pre-preg fiberglass, steel spaceframe chassis
- Suspension: Unequal length wishbones, pushrod actuated coil springs over shock absorbers, inboard rocker arms
- Length: 4,470 mm (176 in)
- Width: 1,900 mm (75 in)
- Axle track: 1,500 mm (59 in) (front); 1,600 mm (63 in) (rear)
- Wheelbase: 2,525 mm (99.4 in)
- Engine: Alfa Romeo, Opel, or Nissan VQ 3.0–3.5 L (183.1–213.6 cu in) 54°-60° DOHC V6, naturally-aspirated, mid-engined
- Transmission: Hewland NMT-200 6-speed sequential
- Power: 350–385 hp (261–287 kW)
- Weight: 720 kg (1,590 lb)

Competition history
- Debut: 2001 FIA Sportscar Championship Barcelona
- Last event: 2005 1000km of Istanbul
Races	Wins	Podiums	Poles	F/Laps
19	1	2	1	0
- Teams' Championships: 0
- Drivers' Championships: 0

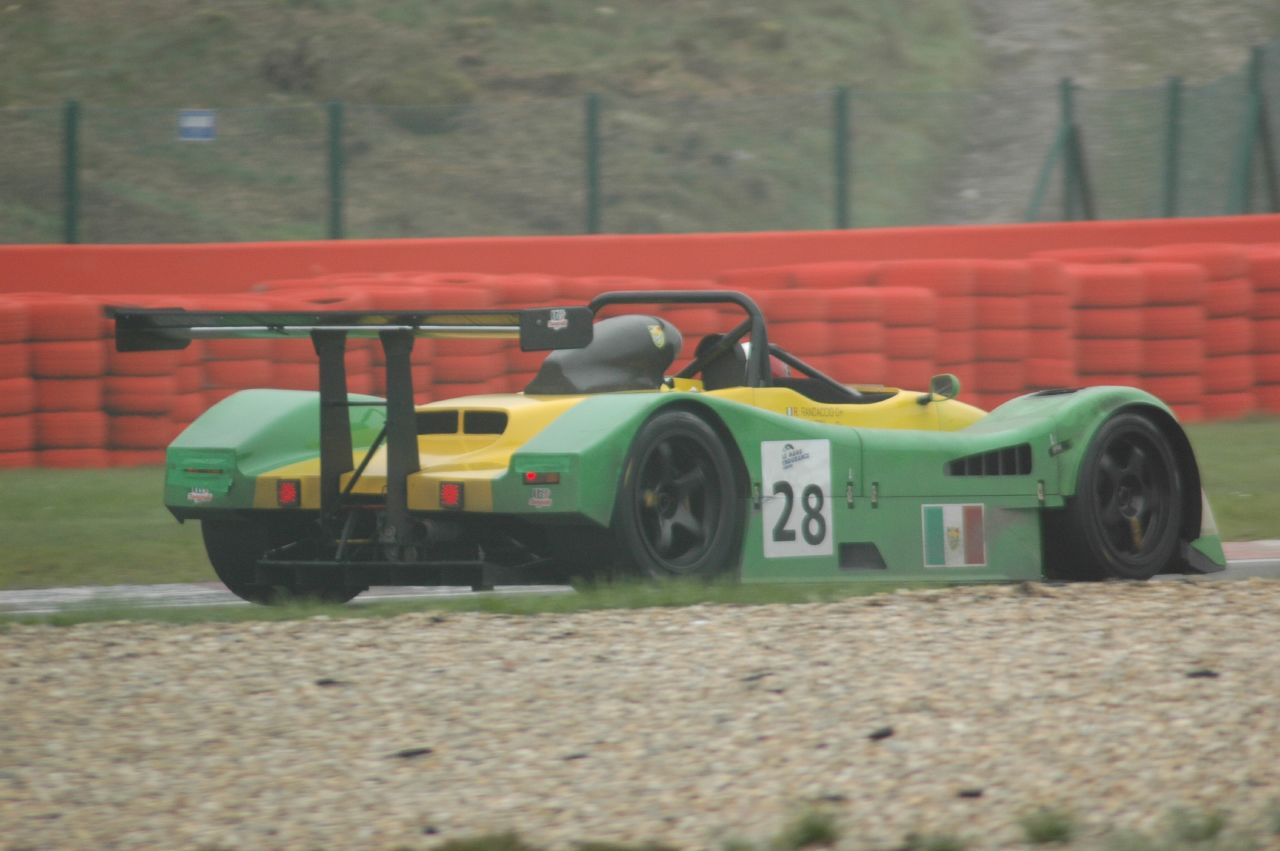
Tampolli RTA-2001

The Tampolli RTA-2001 is a sports prototype race car, designed, developed, and built by Italian manufacturer Tampolli, for sports car racing, conforming to the FIA's LMP675/SR2 class, produced between 2001 and 2003.

== Competition history ==
=== 2001 ===
At the first round of the FIA Sportscar Championship at Barcelona, the car was entered by Renauer Motorsport but did not start. The car did not find good results apart from an 8th overall finish at Nürburgring, the final race of the season.

=== 2002 ===
The car was campaigned by Renauer Motorsport and JCI Developments entering 3 rounds in the 2002 FIA Sportscar Championship but only finished one race at the rain shortenedSpa round.

=== 2003 ===
The car competed in the Interserie Racing Challenge and obtained its first podium with a 3rd place at Most.

=== 2004 ===
In 2004, the car was entered into the Le Mans Endurance Series but not finish a race. The first and only win occurred at the Interserie round at Lausitzring.

=== 2005 ===
Entered by Ranieri Randaccio and Tracsport in the Le Mans Endurance Series it had its only finish at the 1000 km of Istanbul.
