= Sintura S99 =

British race car

- Category: GT1
- Constructor: Sintura Cars Ltd
- Designer(s): Phil Bourne
- Production: 1999

Technical specifications
- Chassis: Carbon fiber monocoque
- Suspension: Double wishbone push-rod actuated coil springs over shock absorbers, anti-roll bar
- Engine: Judd GV4 3,998 cc (244 cu in) V10 naturally aspirated, rear mid-mounted
- Transmission: Lola 6-speed sequential manual
- Tyres: Dunlop

Competition history
- Notable drivers: (United Kingdom) Kurt Luby; (United Kingdom) Richard Dean
- Debut: Brands Hatch 1999
Races	Wins	Podiums	Poles
8	1	4	2

The Sintura S99 is a grand tourer-style race car designed by Phil Bourne and built by Sintura Cars. Built to GT1 regulations, one chassis was completed and raced in both the 1999 British GT Championship and the 1999 American Le Mans Series.

== History ==
Led by Richard Austin, the owner of Evesham Micros, the S99 was developed as an independent successor to the Harrier LR9C platform of cars that competed in British GT from 1994 to 1998. Under the guidance of lead designer Phil Bourne, the S99 stretched the limits of GT1 regulations through the use of a Formula 1-derived Judd GV4 V10 engine and a carbon fiber chassis manufactured by Lola. Despite the homologation requirements of GT1 mandating the production of at least one road legal chassis, the single S99 race chassis was granted entry into the 1999 British GT Championship by the British Racing Drivers' Club.

In the hands of drivers Richard Dean and Kurt Luby, the S99 achieved a podium finish in every British GT race that it completed, including one win at Silverstone. In an attempt to recruit customer teams for the following season, the team skipped the final round of the British GT season to compete in the penultimate round of the 1999 American Le Mans Series at Laguna Seca, finishing ninth overall.

After failing to recruit a customer team in advance of the 2000 season, Sintura retired the S99 from competition. The company was liquidated in 2002 and the single chassis and all spare parts were sold to enthusiast David Dicker in New Zealand.

== Rodin Sintura ==
In 2024, Dicker's company Rodin Cars unveiled the Rodin Sintura, a second chassis built from the S99's original spare body panels. The new second chassis is powered by an in-house Rodin RC.TEN 4.0L V10 engine and an in-house gearbox. The car made its public debut at the Yokohama World Time Attack Challenge 2024 in the Pro Class, finishing second overall with driver Josh Buchan.
