= Harrier LR9C =

British race car

- Category: GT1 and GT2
- Constructor: Harrier Cars Ltd
- Designers: Lester Ray and David Fidgeon
- Production: 1994 to 1998
- Predecessor: Harrier LR7
- Successor: Harrier LR10

Technical specifications
- Chassis: Steel tube frame
- Suspension: Double wishbone push-rod activated coil springs over shock absorbers, anti-roll bar
- Engine: Cosworth YB 1,993 cc (121.6 cu in) L4 turbocharged, rear mid-mounted
- Transmission: Hewland 5-speed manual
- Tyres: Dunlop

Competition history
- Notable drivers: (United Kingdom) Win Percy; (United Kingdom) Jamie Campbell-Walter; (Australia) Charlie Cox
- Debut: Silverstone 1994
Races	Wins	Podiums
36	8	10

The Harrier LR9C is a grand tourer-style race car designed and built by Harrier Cars. Built to GT1 and GT2 regulations, it is based on a stillborn road car prototype released in 1991. The LR9C competed in the British GT Championship from 1994 to 1998 and contested the 1994 24 Hours of Le Mans.

== History ==
The original Harrier LR9 prototype car was revealed in 1991 as an Alfa Romeo-powered coupe designed by Lester Ray. By 1994 the car had failed to enter production, but a racing chassis named the LR9C appeared at the opening round of the 1994 British GT Championship with driver Ian Jacobs. After making select starts throughout the season, the closed-top British GT chassis was converted to an open-top GT2 configuration for entry into the 24 Hours of Le Mans. Named the LR9 Sypder LM, the car failed to finish with support from Chamberlain Engineering.

In 1995 Richard Austin, the owner of Evesham Micros provided new financing, the LR9C was campaigned for the full British GT season. After failing to finish the first five races of the season with a rotating driver roster including Jacobs and Austin, Win Percy delivered the car's first win at round six at Thruxton. Harrier expanded to a two car operation in 1996, fielding a new GT2 entry for Austin and a GT1 entry for Percy. The car achieved three wins with Percy as a solo driver in 1996, including back-to-back wins in the final two races of the championship.

== LR9 GT97 ==
In 1997 an updated version of the GT1 specification car was introduced for the 1997. The new LR9 GT97 featured revised bodywork, an enlarged rear wing, and a new roof scoop air intake. Percy and new teammate Charlie Cox achieved three wins in the updated LR9C, matching the previous season's win total.

== GT1-98 ==
The final iteration of the vehicle platform, developed by Phil Bourne for the 1998 British GT Championship. Featuring significantly revised bodywork, the new design was an attempt to better compete with updated entrants including the long tail McLaren F1 GTR and the revised Lister Storm GTL. However, even with new lead driver Jamie Campbell-Walter, the GT1-98 failed to achieve a single podium in 1998 as Harrier slipped into the midfield.

When Richard Austin failed in his bid to buy Harrier the LR9C was retired from active competition following the 1998 season. Richard Austin and Phil Bourne left soon thereafter to build the Sintura S99 that contested the following year's championship.
