= Home Computer Initiative =

The Home Computing Initiative (HCI) was a UK Government program which allowed employers to provide personal computers, software and computer peripherals to their employees without the benefit being taxed as a salary. The HCI was introduced in 1999 to improve the IT literacy of the British workforce. It was also aimed at bridging Britain's digital divide - the increasing gap between those who have access to, and the skills to use, information technology, and those who do not. The program gained traction after four years, in 2003 after it was re-branded. The Trades Union Congress and the Department of Trade and Industry also made the initiative more user-friendly by publishing standard guideline that employers could easily adopt.

The HCI program was a lease agreement between the employer and the employee. The agreement usually lasted for three years, costing a maximum of £500 a year. At the end of the lease period, the employee was given the option to purchase the computer at its market value, which was typically £10 at that time.

The HCI scheme was very popular. More than 1250 firms, employing 4.5 million people, had adopted the scheme.

== Discontinuation ==
On 23 March 2006, in his UK Budget, Chancellor Gordon Brown announced the removal of HCI tax exemption for employer-loaned computers. As of 6 April 2006 the HCI program was discontinued. The move was made without any consultation with the employers or employees' bodies, a stark contrast to the extensive consultation that preceded its creation.

The Treasury of the United Kingdom made initial claims that the scheme's consumers were being dominated by higher-rate taxpayers. However, research by the HCI Alliance found that 75% of employees who purchased personal computers through the HCI were basic or starting rate taxpayers and 50% were "blue collar" workers. The HCI Alliance, created in 2003, was a group of industry leaders who worked together with the UK Government. Their aim was to increase access to personal computing in the UK.

Another reason for the HCI being cancelled was that computers had become relatively more affordable. Most people in the workplace had access to computers and therefore, the purpose of the scheme had been achieved.

In the days following the budget announcement, a significant lobbying campaign ensued, resulting in the treasury announcing that it would consider alternatives to HCI in its current format rather than disbanding it altogether. This led to the creation of the Educational Technology Allowance.

== Educational Technology Allowance ==
In 2008, the Gordon Brown administration announced the £300 million Educational Technology Allowance incentive. The program granted up to £700 to low-income households with schooling children who had no internet access at home. The policy was aimed towards helping approximately 1.4 million children who did not have access to a broadband connection at home. The program was piloted in two local authority areas in 2010 and was completely rolled out across England in 2011. The funding for the Educational Technology Allowance came from the Children's and Schools budget.

The money could be used by families to pay for computer equipment, technical support and cabling in the street, if necessary. The Educational Technology Allowance was not offered in Scotland, Wales and Northern Ireland.
