= Courage C34 =

Sports car prototype

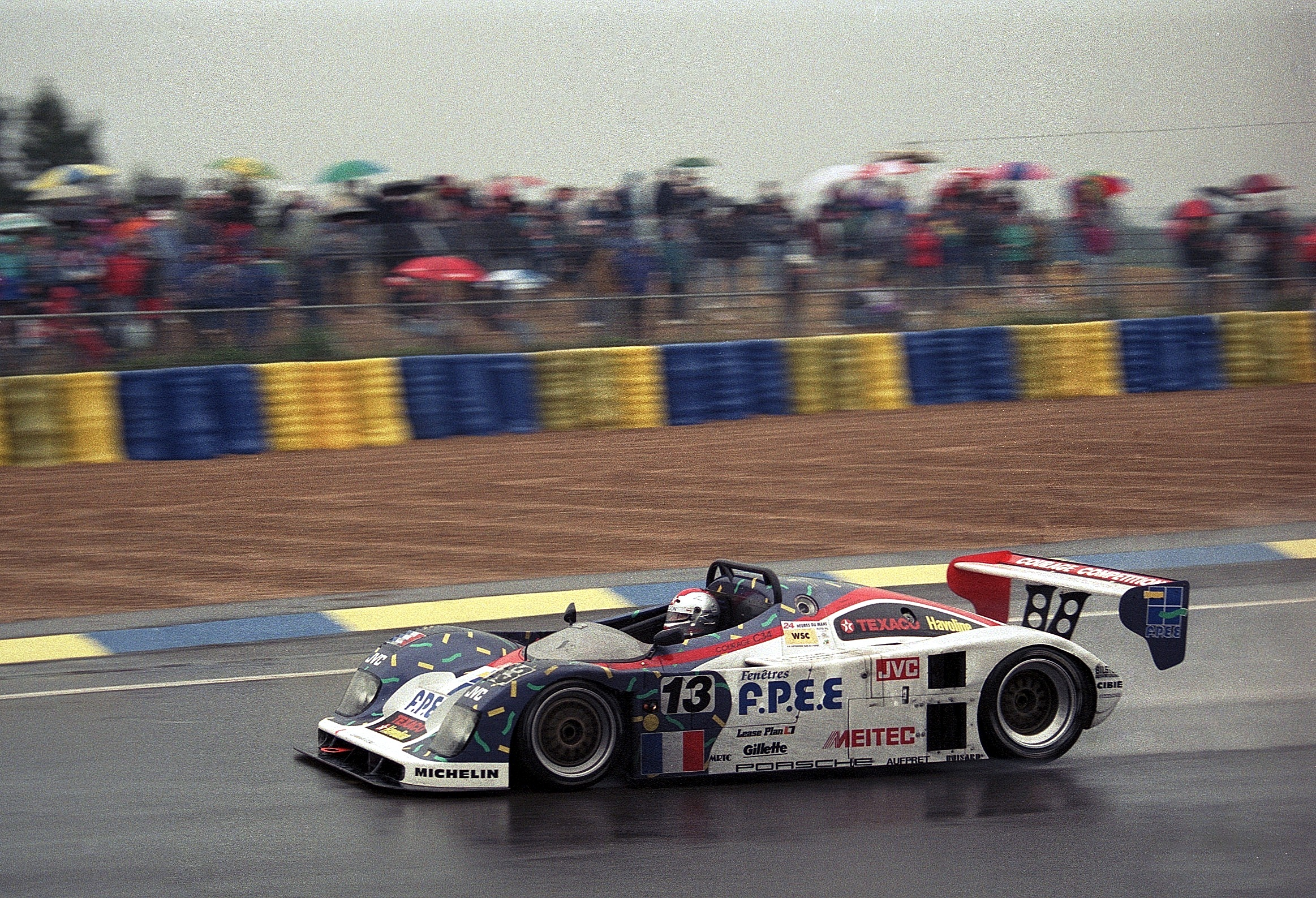
Mario Andretti at the wheel of the Courage C34, at the 1995 24 Hours of Le Mans

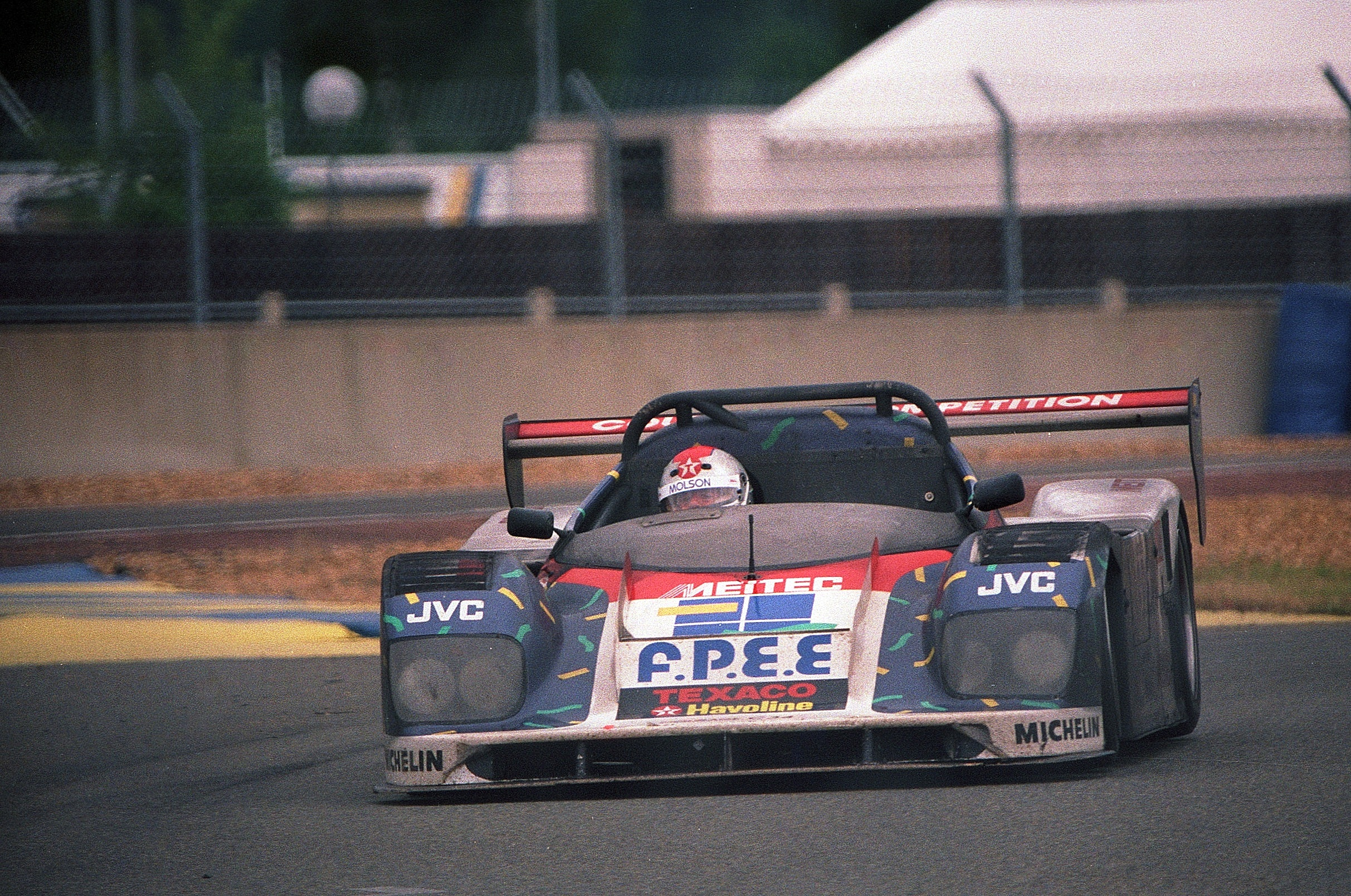
Front-view

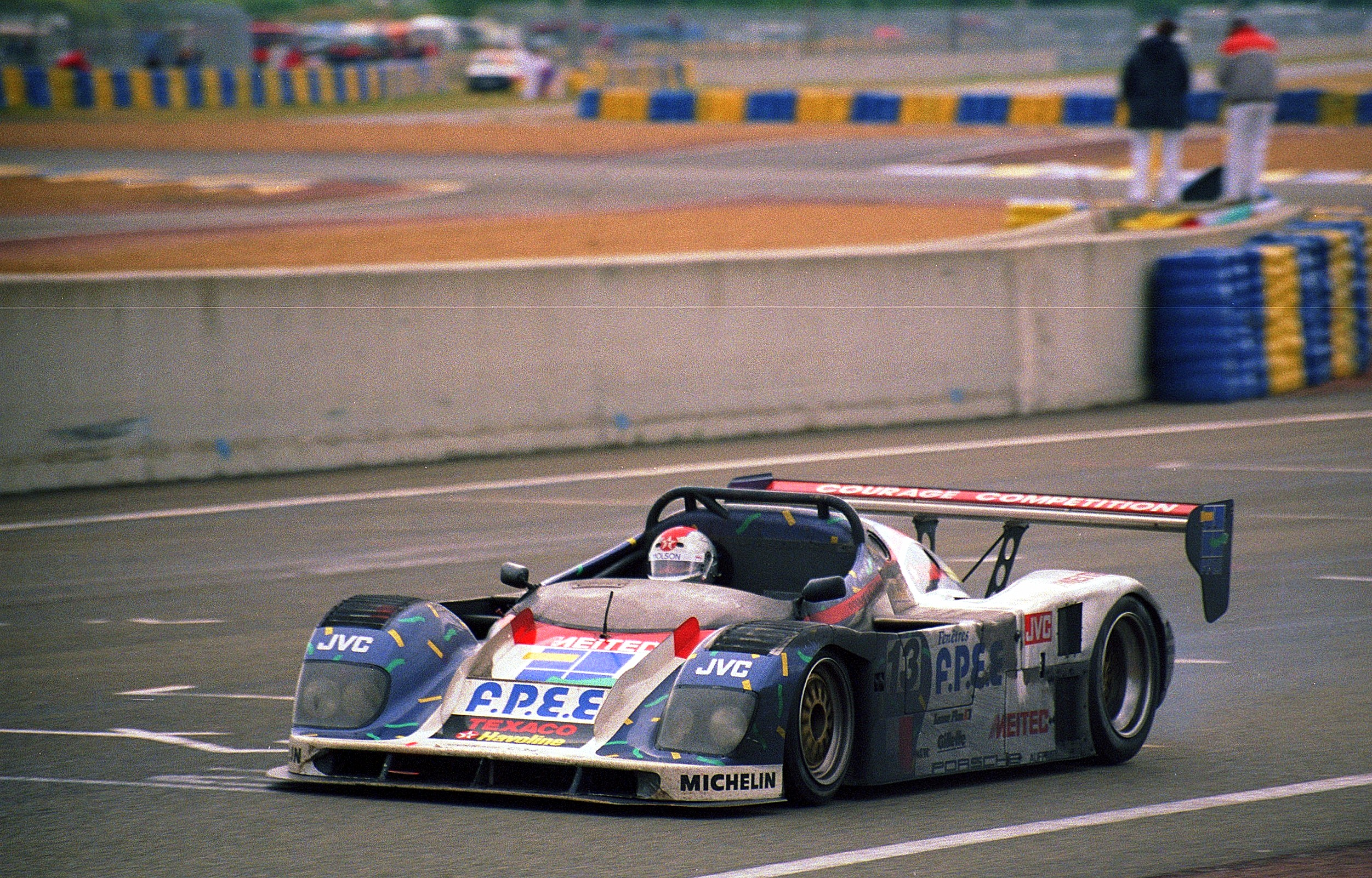
Andretti on the pit straight

The Courage C34 was a sports car prototype, designed, developed and built by French manufacturer Courage in 1995. It famously contested the 1995 24 Hours of Le Mans, where it managed to finish 2nd overall and 1st in its class.

== Development history ==
The Courage C34 was developed in 1995 by Courage Compétition headed by Yves Courage with the intention of winning the 24 Hours of Le Mans. Like the previous models, the Courage C30 and the Courage C32, the C34 was largely based on Porsche technology. The proven 530 hp (400 kW) 6-cylinder turbo engine from the German sports car manufacturer was also used again in the C34. In 1995, the C34, alongside the Kremer K8 Spyder, was the second of four entrants in the large prototype class to have a realistic chance of overall victory.

== Racing history ==
Éric Hélary, Bob Wollek, and Mario Andretti were committed as drivers. Courage narrowly missed out on overall victory in 1995. The C-34 team started the race from pole position, which was characterized by heavy rain for the first few hours. In this phase, however, the powerful prototype was inferior to the GT racing cars, which transferred their performance better to the road on the wet track. When the racetrack dried out on Sunday morning, the team was able to almost make up the deficit they had suffered in the rain and finished second overall, just one lap behind the McLaren F1 GTR of Lehto, Dalmas and Sekiya.
