= Evesham Technology =

Computer company in Evesham, England

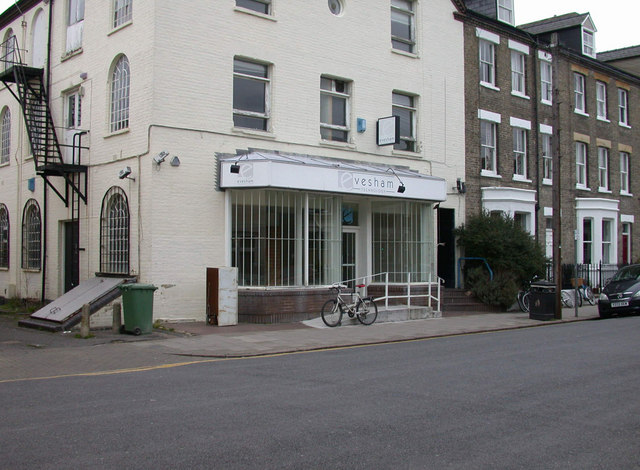
- Former Evesham Technology Showroom in Cambridge
- Type: Private
- Industry: Computing
- Genre: Computer and software sales and manufacture
- Predecessor: Evesham Micros
- Founded: Evesham, United Kingdom 1983. Liquidated 2008
- Founder: Richard Austin, Robert Hitchcock
- Headquarters: Evesham, Worcestershire, United Kingdom
- Number of locations: 1 factory, 19 stores throughout UK.
- Area served: UK
- Products: Computers, software, peripherals
- Number of employees: 300

Evesham Technology was a computer manufacturing and retail company based in Evesham, Worcestershire, England. It began operations in 1983 and closed in 2008 following financial difficulties. It was a significant contributor to the United Kingdom's domestic computer and digital television market. Its assets grew to include a factory and warehouse complex, and a chain of 19 retail stores in towns and cities throughout the UK, with around 300 employees. The company was founded in 1983 by Richard Austin and Robert (Bob) Hitchcock as Evesham Micros, to be briefly known as Evesham.com and finally as Evesham Technology. Austin continued as chairman and controlling shareholder until the company and its much reduced, short-lived successor, Geemore Technology Ltd, went into liquidation.

== Company history ==
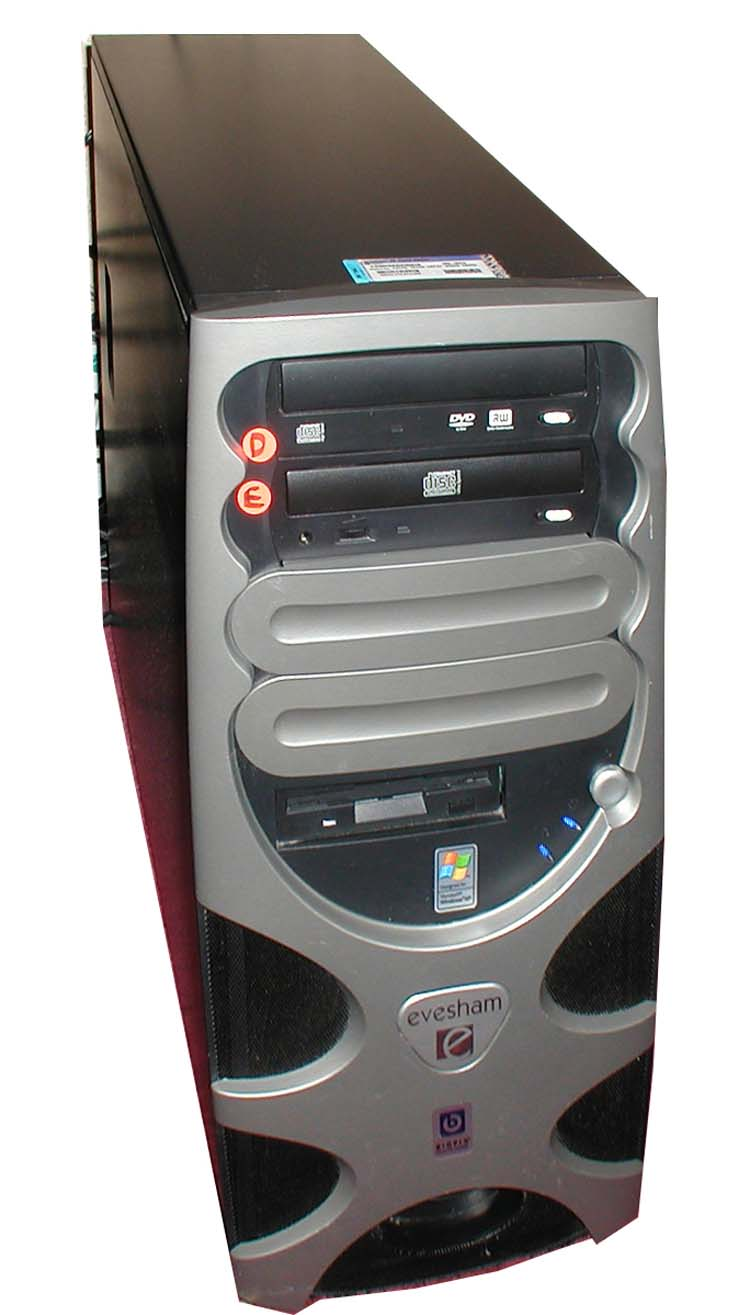
The tower of an Evesham 3 GHz computer, model Dual SLi

Initially specialising in Amstrad computers, Evesham began trading in 1983 as Evesham Micros, and for a short while as Evesham.com. It expanded its activities to include desktop and laptop computers, software, components and peripherals, servers, storage and networking as well as gaming systems, LCD televisions, digital TV recorders, and satellite navigation. The sale of the Amstrad at competitive prices contributed to the initial success of the company. It developed and licensed a number of peripherals and upgrades for the ZX Spectrum (48K memory upgrade, Interface III cheat/copy Cartridge) and Commodore 64 (Freeze Frame cheat/copy Cartridge, Dolphin DOS disk drive accelerator, Oceanic disk drive replacement) in the second half of the 1980s.

The company continued to sell computers at discounted prices, retailing an end of line stock Olivetti PC, the UK's first PC to be priced under £300. In December 1991, it cleared remaining stocks of the Amstrad's PC 2000 range, including 286 and 386DX machines selling for well under £1,000. Evesham became the UK's largest supplier of Atari ST computers, also selling them at discounted prices, having purchased large stocks. They also sold a range of software and peripherals for Amiga and Atari ST computers. Many of the products it designed were innovative and received favourable reviews by the computer press.

The company moved premises from Bridge Street to St Richards Road in 1989, opened a manufacturing plant, and began marketing under the brand name of Zydec. In early 1992 Evesham released, under the name Vale, its first home produced PC, intended to be sold as part of the Zydec product range. The Zydec name was later revived as a range of low costing PCs sold briefly alongside the Vale range. The company expanded, and acquired a number of industrial units on the Four Pools Industrial Estate. In 1998, Evesham relocated to purpose built facilities at Vale Park. In 2002 it merged with Mertec, a company established for over 20 years in Swansea, South Wales that held long-term supply and service contracts with some of the largest Welsh institutions. In mid-2004 Evesham and FalconStor Software, Inc., a leading developer of network storage infrastructure software solutions, announced an OEM agreement to supply the UK market with FalconStor's iSCSI Storage Server for Windows Storage Server 2003(R) (iSCSI Storage Server), with Evesham's SilverSTOR iSAN family of products.

By 2007, Evesham Technology had more than 300 employees and offered a wide range of self-manufactured, imported, and assembled products that included desktops, laptops, servers, plasma and LCD displays, Media PCs and NAS servers, peripherals, and networking equipment. Its products were marketed through its own chain of 19 retail outlets in UK towns and cities including Altrincham, Birmingham, Bristol, Cambridge, Glasgow, Ipswich, London, Milton Keynes, Norwich, Nottingham, Peterborough, Reading, Southampton, Swansea, and Tunbridge Wells. It was a founding member of the PC Association and was one of the few major suppliers recommended by BECTA, the UK's educational ICT advisory organisation.

== Financial problems and closure ==
Evesham had invested heavily into the UK government Home Computer Initiative, and encountered financial problems when the Labour government announced the sudden withdrawal of the scheme in 2007, leading to the appointment of Leonard Curtis as administrators. In August 2007, the company received a help package in the form of an investment of $22 million from PCC Technology, a Dubai based investment fund controlled by Time Group founder Tahir Mohsan.

The chain of retail stores were closed and Evesham continued to trade as newly formed Geemore Technology Ltd., a much smaller and re-structured company under the directorship of Austin, with about one third of the Evesham workforce. Customers were not immediately affected by the change. Geemore operated from the former Evesham premises at Vale Park, and the Elite Logo Company, a dormant business owned by Tahir Mohsan and Tariq Mohammed, was registered as secretary of the new firm. In February 2008, PCC Technology, issued a press release saying that the restructuring of the failed Evesham Technology was complete and had gone well under the circumstances. They also indicated that they were looking to resell the Evesham brand which was trading under the new company, Geemore Technology Ltd. After a lack of interest from potential buyers, however, the company finally closed down towards the end of March and the three-month contracts of all remaining Evesham staff who stayed on at Geemore expired. All consumer orders were fulfilled or deposits refunded, and a large number of staff were retained by Evesham while its operations were reduced in a controlled manner. Warranties however, lost their validity as Moshan's PCC did not provide for continued customer support under the terms of the original product guarantees.

A group of former staff from Evesham headed by former Evesham employee Robin Daunter started Tewktech, a company selling computers and offering repairs for a variety of brands including Evesham Technology.
