= Courage C30 =

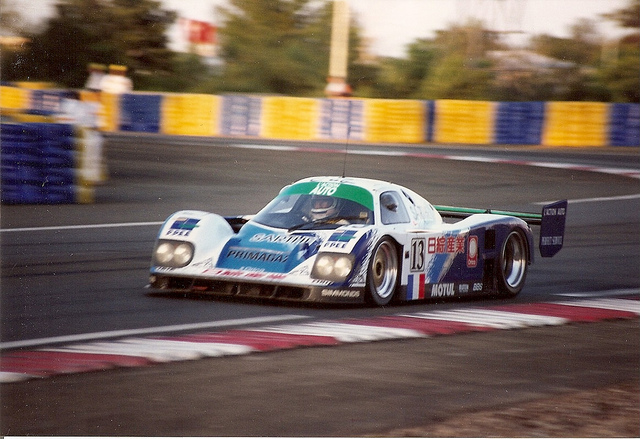
Courage C30LM at the 1993 24 Hours of Le Mans

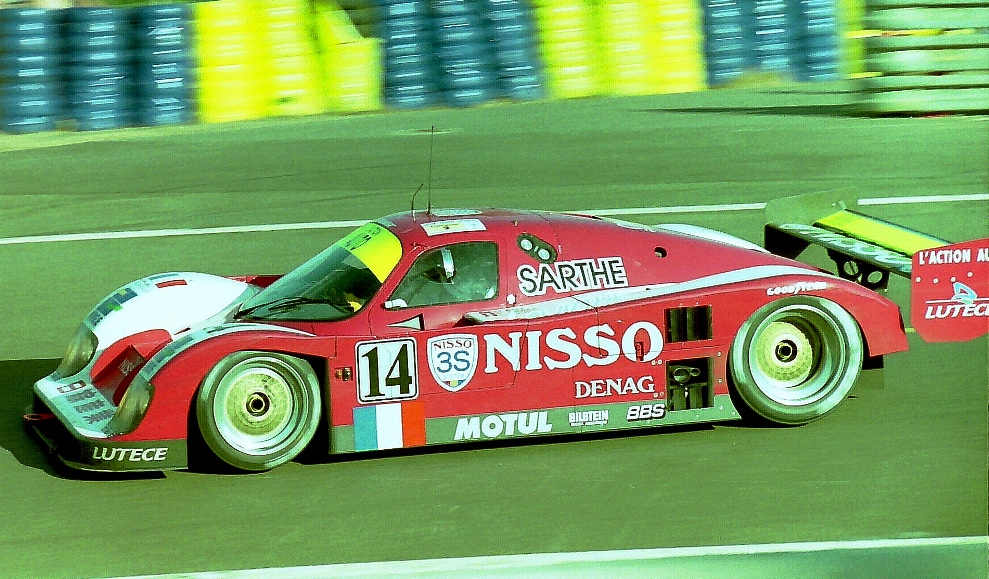
#14 Courage C30LM of Derek Bell, Lionel Robert & Pascal Fabre at the 1993 24 Hours of Le Mans

The Courage C30, also known as the Courage C30LM, was a Group C2 sports prototype, designed, developed and built by French manufacturer Courage in 1993. It famously contested in the 1993 24 Hours of Le Mans, with drivers Derek Bell and Pierre Yver finishing in 10th and 11th place, respectively.

== Development history and technology ==
The C30 was the first Courage sports car to bear the Yves Courage name. Until 1993, his sports cars ran under the type designation Cougar. In the absence of a championship, the C30s were primarily built for the 24 Hours of Le Mans.

As with the Cougar racing cars, Courage also relied on Porsche technology for the C30. The car competed in the small Le Mans prototype class, the C2 class. The 532 hp (397 kW) 3-liter Porsche 935 turbo engine was used in the closed racing car. The gearbox was also supplied by Porsche. The chassis was taken from the Porsche 962 but modified and aerodynamically modified by Courage. Unlike most Le Mans starters, who used Michelin or Dunlop tires, Courage relied on Goodyear racing tires.

== Racing history ==
Yves Courage signed the five-time Le Mans winner Derek Bell and the Frenchman Pascal Fabre as his regular drivers. In the race, the C30 had no chance of winning the class they had hoped for. This went to the Toyota 93C team with Roland Ratzenberger, Mauro Martini, and Naoki Nagasaka at the wheel, who finished fifth overall. Overall victory went to the Peugeot 905 driven by Éric Hélary, Christophe Bouchut and Geoff Brabham .

The two C30s finished tenth and eleventh in the overall standings and finished fifth and sixth in the C2 class.

=== Courage C32 (C32LM) ===
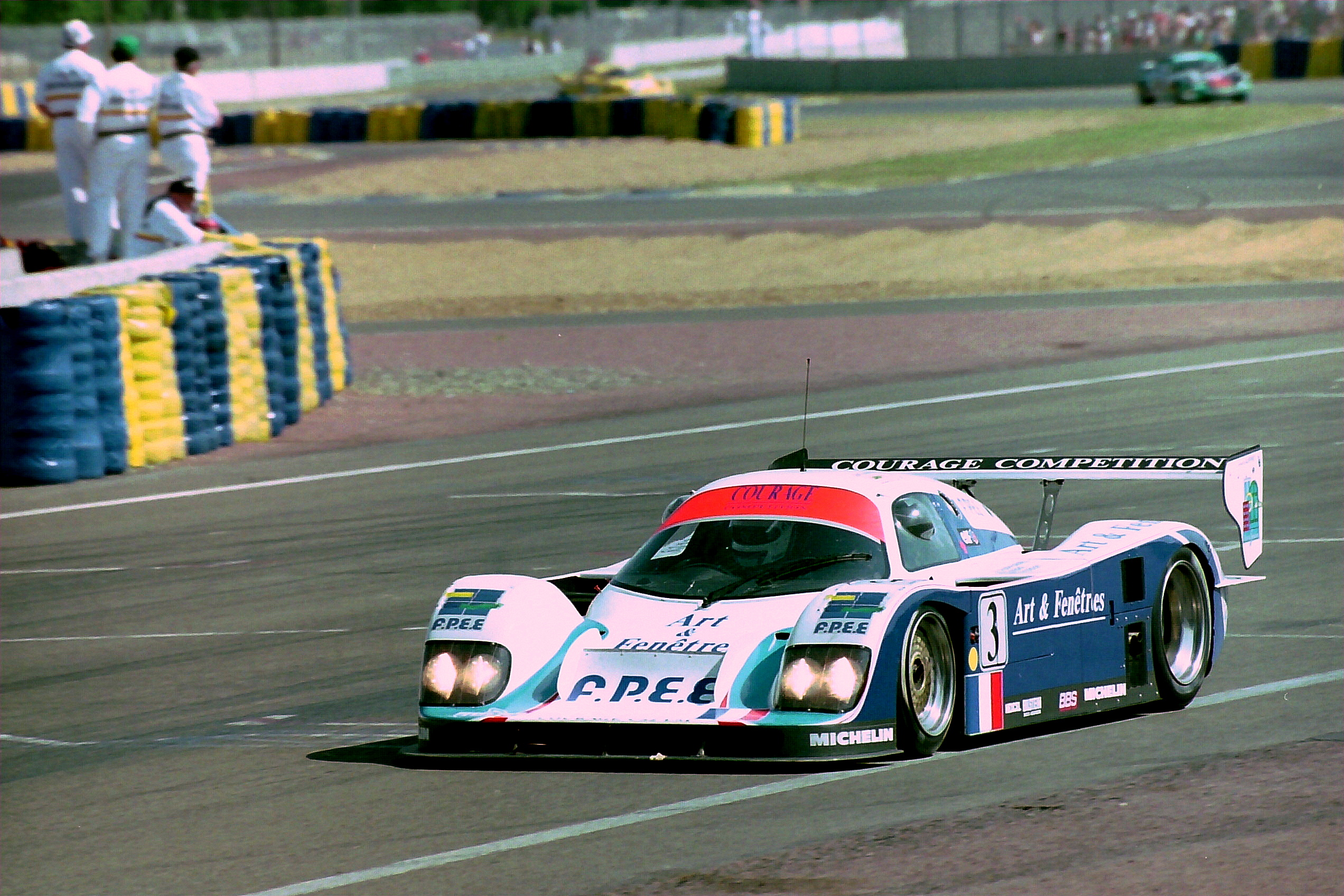
1994 Courage C32 (C32LM)

The car was upgraded to the Courage C32 (also called Courage C32LM) designation in 1994. The car took part in the 1994 Le Mans 24 hour race.

As with the previous cars of the French manufacturer, the Courage C32 was also equipped with many mechanical components derived from Porsche. The engine was the 3-liter turbo boxer from the Porsche 935 and the transmission was also provided by Porsche. The car wore Michelin racing tires.

The Courage at the 24 Hours of Le Mans 1994 fielded three C32s: one finished seventh overall, while the other two retired.
