= Le Mans Prototype =

Sportscar endurance racing class

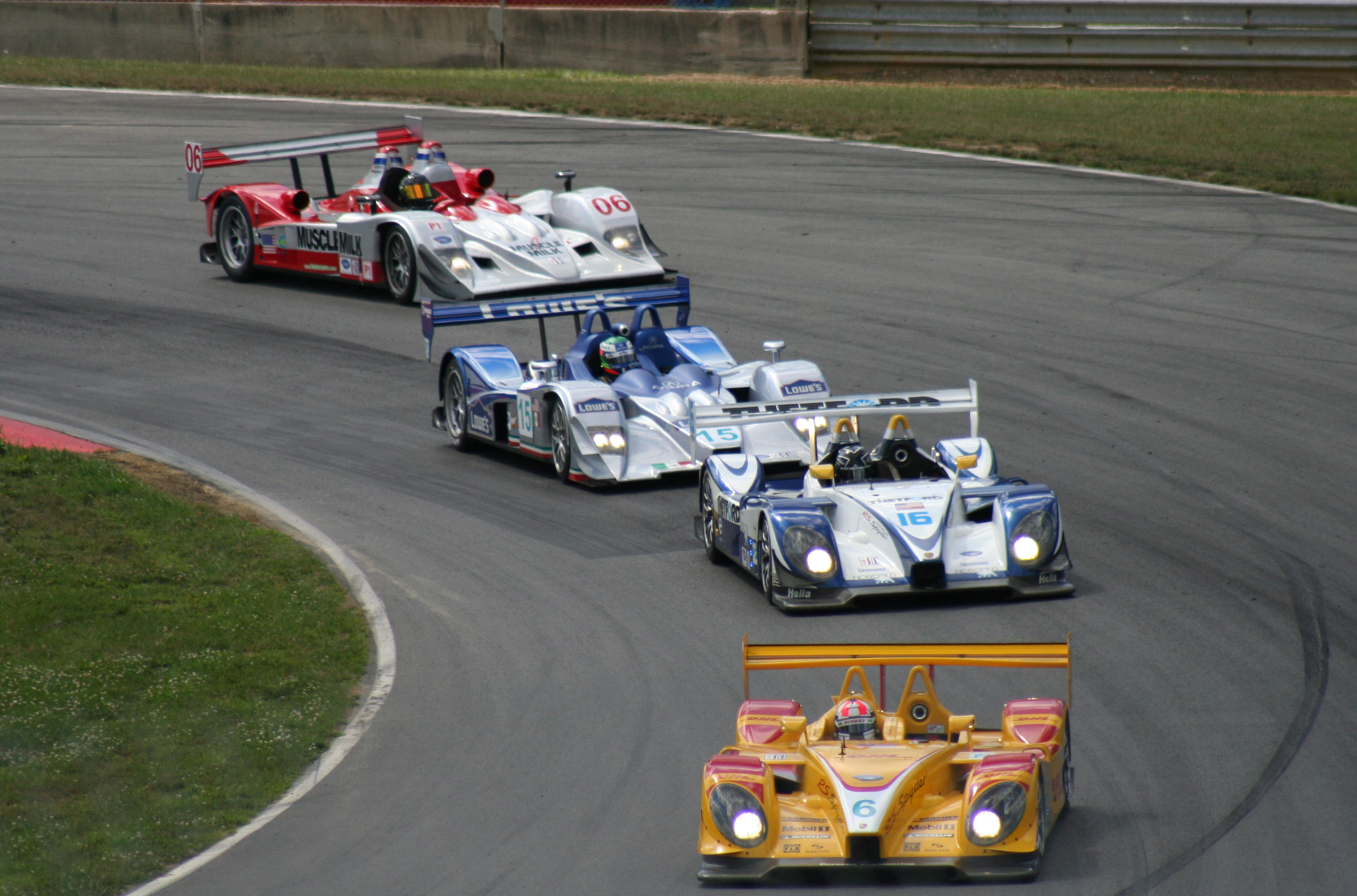
A group of Le Mans Prototypes competing in the American Le Mans Series (ALMS), 2007

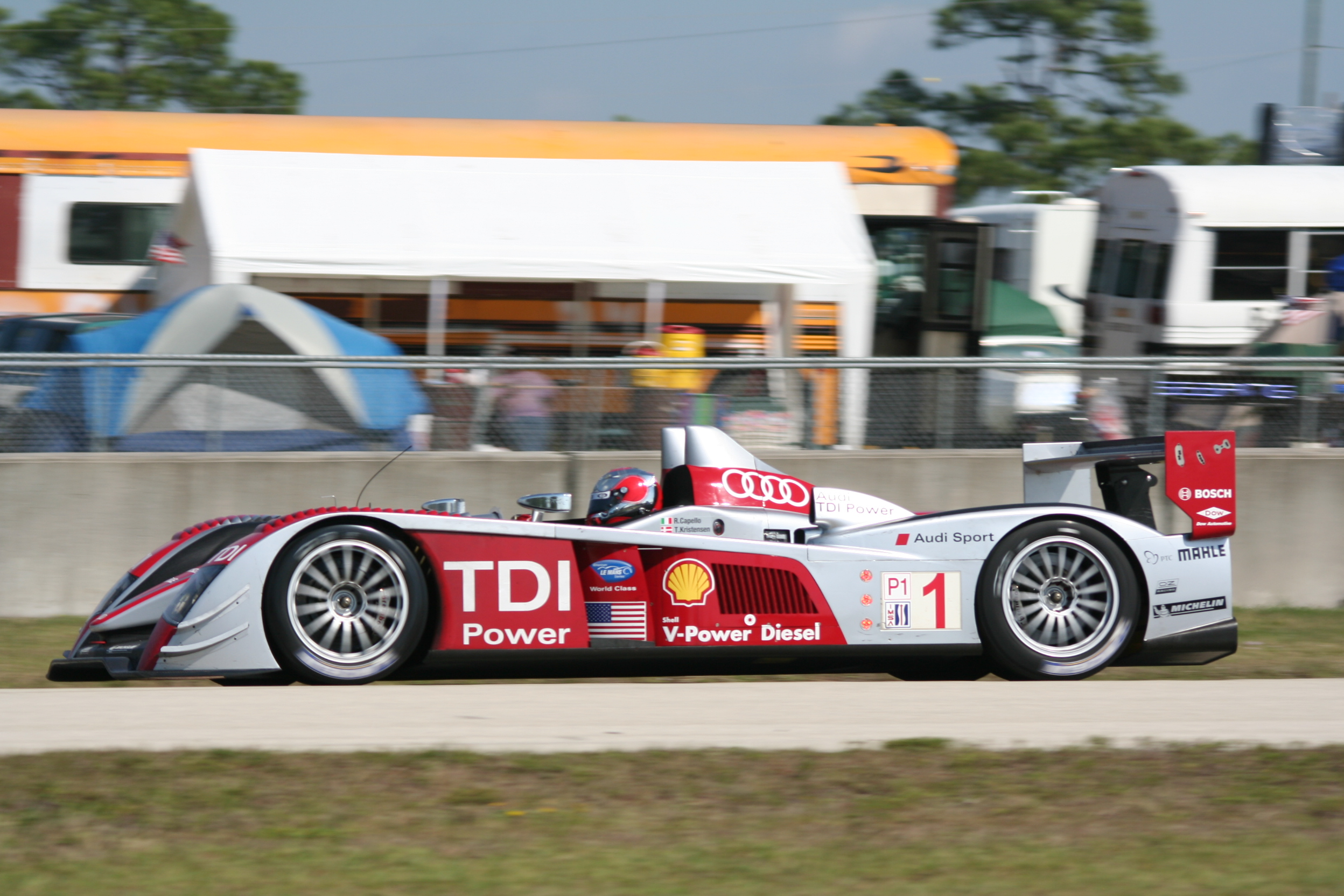
Audi R10 TDI in the 2008 12 Hours of Sebring, 2008

A Le Mans Prototype (LMP) is a type of sports prototype race car used in various races and championships, including the 24 Hours of Le Mans, FIA World Endurance Championship (WEC), IMSA SportsCar Championship, European Le Mans Series (ELMS), American Le Mans Series (ALMS), and Asian Le Mans Series (AsLMS). Le Mans Prototypes were created by the Automobile Club de l'Ouest (ACO). The technical requirements for an LMP include bodywork covering all mechanical elements of the car. As of 2026, there are two classes within Le Mans Prototypes, designated LMP2 and LMP3.

The LMP1 class was replaced by the Le Mans Hypercar class in the WEC and the 24 Hours of Le Mans from the 2021 season. Non-hybrid LMP1 cars were eligible to be "grandfathered" for two more seasons and compete alongside the new class for the 2021 and 2022 seasons. While not as fast as open-wheel Formula One cars around a track, the LMP1s were the fastest closed-wheel racing cars used in circuit racing. Le Mans Prototypes are considered a class above production-based grand tourer cars, which compete alongside them in sports car racing. Later, LMP1 designs included hybrid cars that use electric motors to assist acceleration.

Starting from the 2023 season of the WEC and the IMSA SportsCar Championship, Le Mans Hypercars are joined by Le Mans Daytona h (LMDh) cars. These two kinds of prototypes will form the top class of endurance racing: Hypercar in WEC and Grand Touring Prototype (GTP) in IMSA.

== Name variations ==
Le Mans Prototypes have used various names depending on the series in which they compete. The FIA's equivalent cars were referred to as Sports Racers (SR) or Sports Racing Prototypes (SRP). The American IMSA GT Championship termed their cars World Sports Cars (WSC), while the short-lived United States Road Racing Championship (USRRC) used the classic Can-Am (CA) name for their prototypes. Since 2004, most series have switched to referring to these cars as Le Mans Prototypes. An LMP is commonly referred to as a Le Mans car in the media.

== History ==
The first use of what would become Le Mans Prototypes was at the 1992 24 Hours of Le Mans. In an attempt to increase the number of entrants beyond the small field of Group C competitors that the World Sportscar Championship had to offer, older Porsche 962s were allowed entry in Category 3. To further increase the size of the field, small open-cockpit race cars using production road car engines which were raced in small national championships were allowed in Category 4.

Later, ACO announced its intentions to completely replace the Group C cars with Le Mans Prototypes. Two classes were created, with LMP1s running large-displacement custom-built engines that were usually turbocharged, and LMP2s using the smaller displacement production-based engines. Both classes were required to have open cockpits. However, LMP1 cars that year were just former Group C cars, some still with closed cockpits (Toyota 94C-V, Courage C32, Kremer K8 Spyder, Porsche 962C GTI, ALD C289 and Alpa LM).

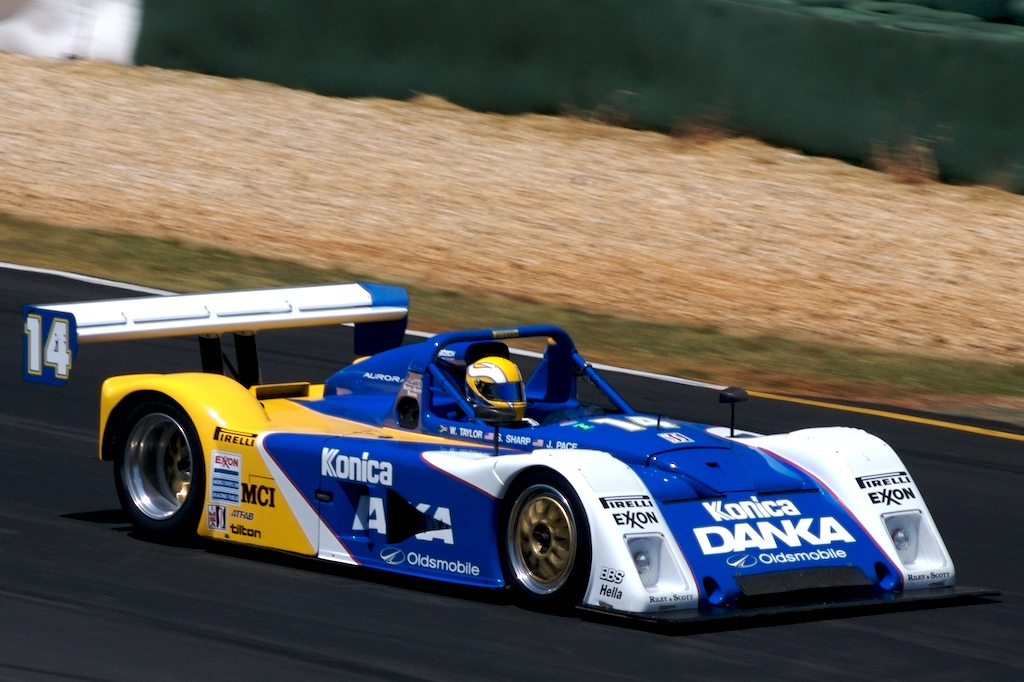
An early Riley & Scott Mk III, which competed in IMSA's WSC class

This formula continued up to 1996, with many manufacturers embracing the LMP and WSC classes, including Ferrari, Porsche, and Mazda. In 1997, the first European series based on Le Mans Prototypes was launched, known as the "International Sports Racing Series". Using classes similar to LMP1/WSC and LMP2, these cars were known as "SR1" and "SR2" by the FIA. 1998 saw the creation of another series of Le Mans Prototypes, with the new United States Road Racing Championship attempting to break away from the IMSA GT Championship. To distinguish itself from IMSA's WSC class, the USRRC named their open-cockpit prototypes "Can-Am" in an attempt to resurrect the sportscar championship of the 1970s.

1998 saw a great expansion for the ACO's LMP classes. The IMSA GT Championship was cancelled at the end of 1998, so the ACO allowed the creation of the American Le Mans Series. This used the same classes as the 24 Hours of Le Mans. At the same time, the ACO changed their LMP classes. The smaller LMP2 class were eliminated, while a new class of closed-cockpit prototypes was created, called "LMGTP" (Le Mans grand touring prototype).

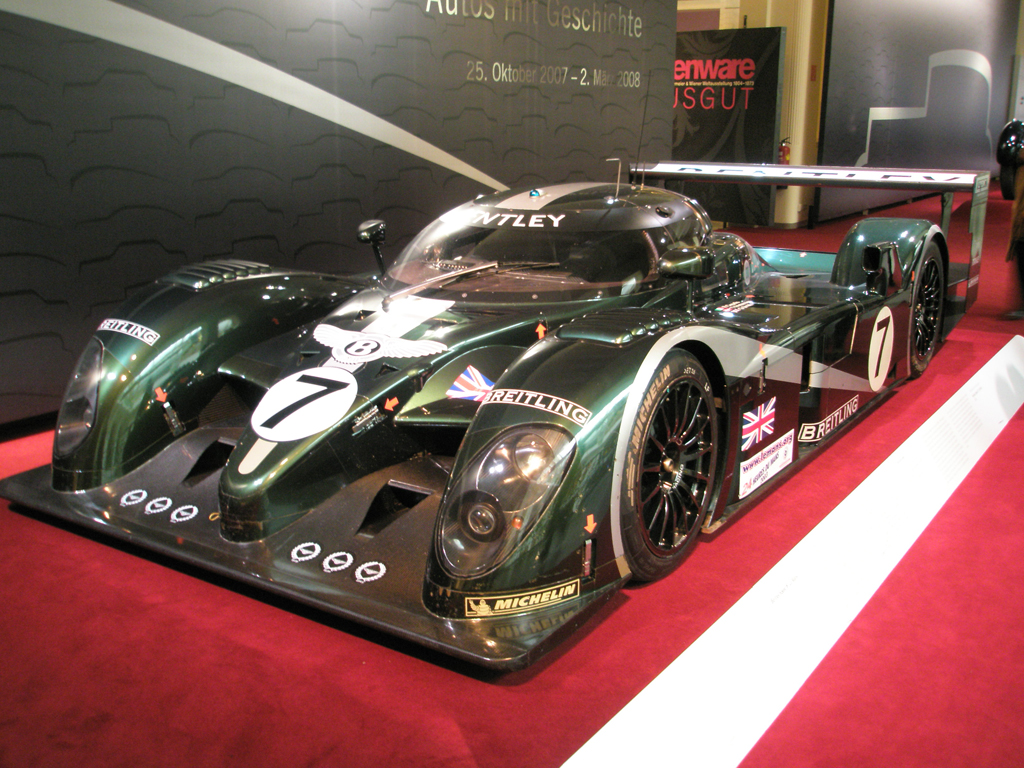
A Bentley Speed 8 as used in 2003

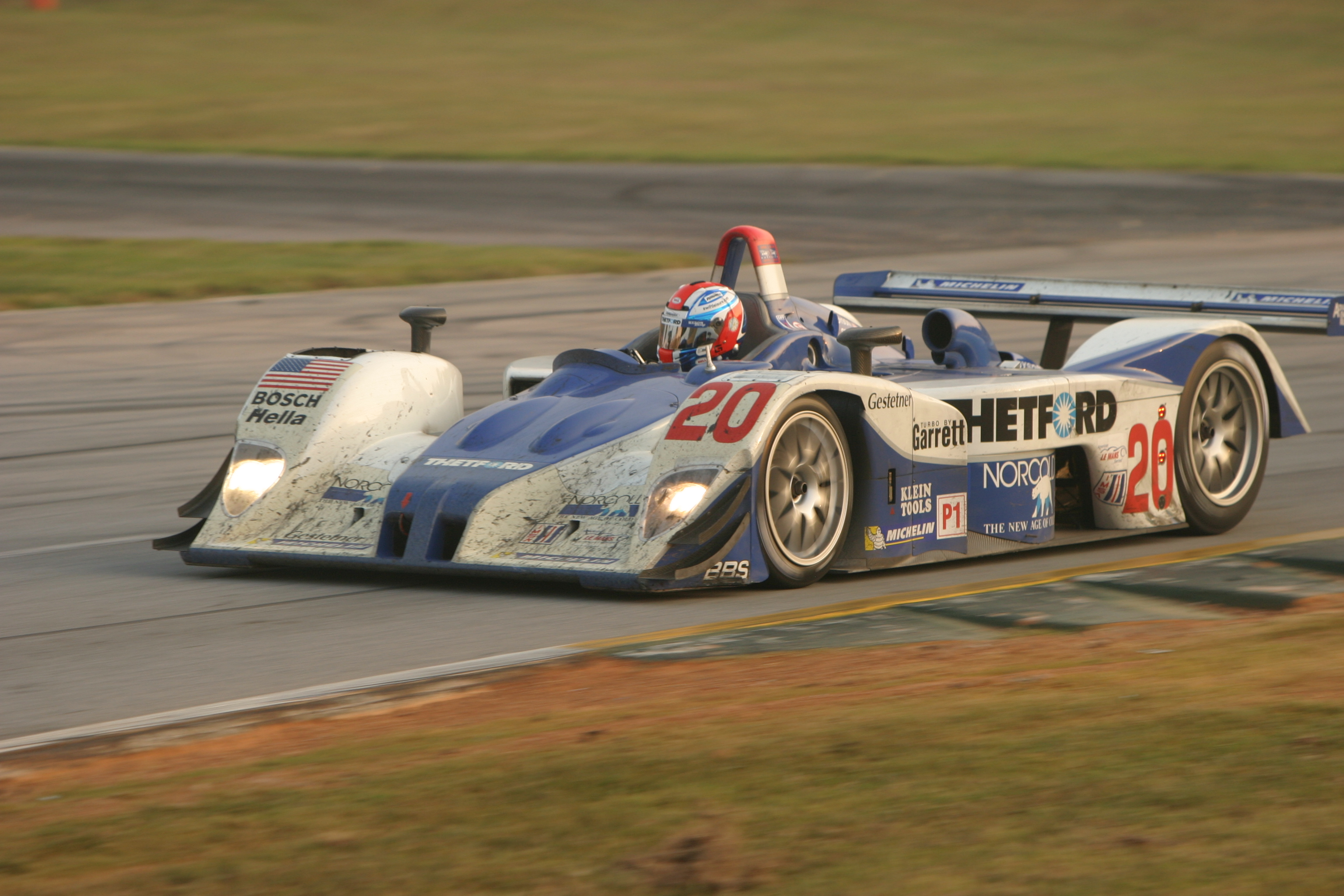
The dominant entry in the short-lived LMP675 class, the MG-Lola EX257

LMP3 was introduced in 2015 as an entry-level prototype class intended for introducing young drivers and new teams to endurance racing before they progress to the higher classes of prototype racing, LMP2 and ultimately Hypercar. LMP3 uses closed-cockpit chassis, which can be built by any licensed constructor, with costs capped for the chassis, engine, and generational upgrade kits. Cars eligible for the 2015–2019 first-generation ruleset were the Ginetta-Juno P3, Ligier JS P3, Norma M30, ADESS-03, and the Ave-Riley AR-2. The cars were eligible in a number of series, such as the Asian Le Mans Series, the European Le Mans Series, as well as the V de V Endurance Series and the IMSA Prototype Challenge. A number of championships for the class were also created, such as the FRD LMP3 series and the British LMP3 Cup. First-generation cars were powered by a 5.0-litre normally-aspirated Nissan VK50VE V8 engine, producing 310 kW (420 hp). Minimum weight was originally 900 kilograms (1,984 lb), before being increased to 930 kilograms (2,050 lb) due to an unexpectedly heavy powertrain package.

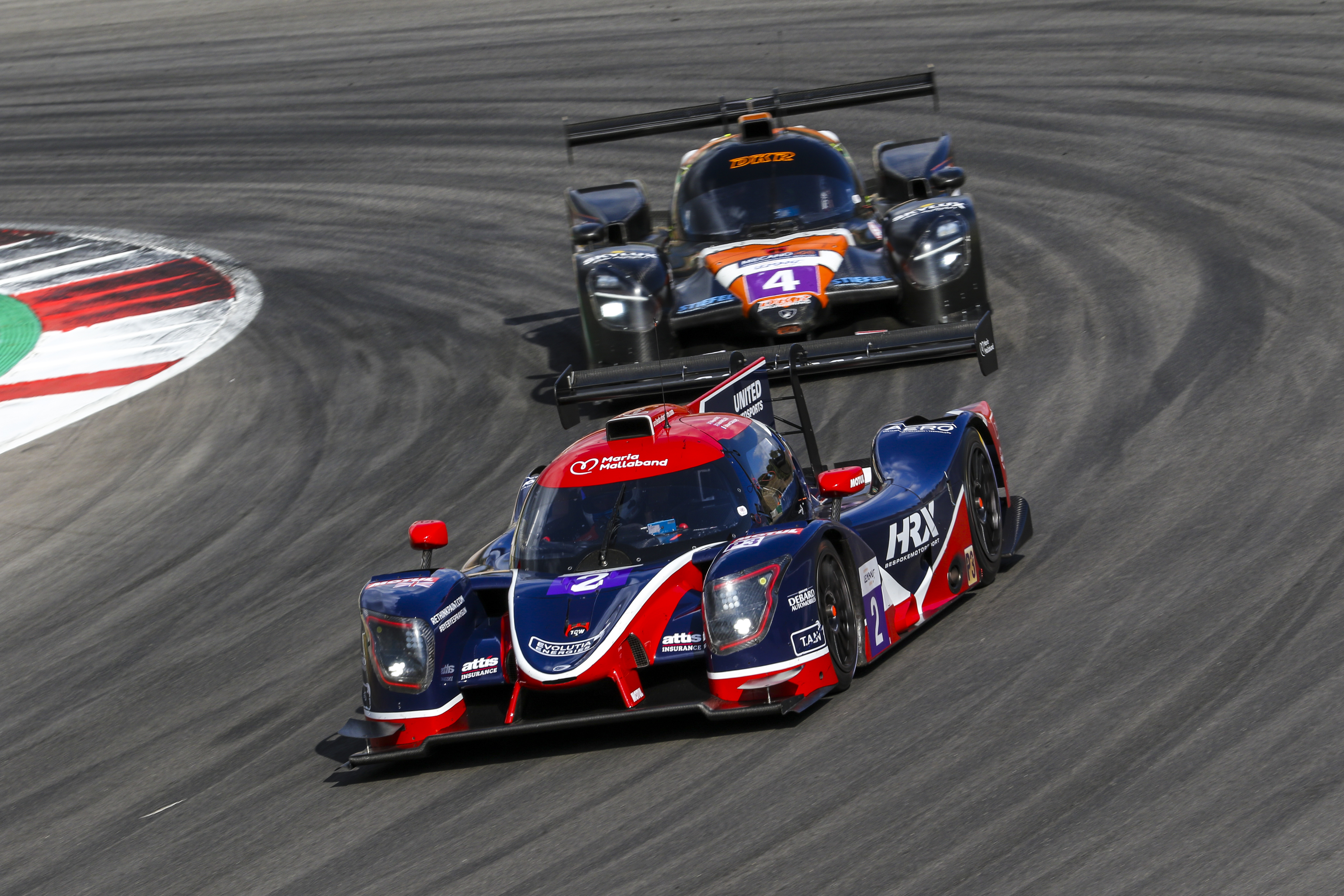
United Autosports Ligier JS P320 and DKR Engineering Duqueine D-08, fighting for the lead of the 2021 4 Hours of Portimão

In 2017, in order to limit costs, the FIA introduced a new set of LMP2 regulations, which were frozen through 2020. All LMP2 cars are thus the same. Gibson Technology is the exclusive engine supplier for LMP2, producing a four-litre normally-aspirated V8. Dallara, Onroak Automotive (Ligier), Oreca and the joint-venture Riley Tech/Multimatic were selected by FIA as the four exclusive chassis constructors, which must be closed-cockpit designs.

A new LMP3 ruleset was implemented in 2020 with new LMP3 cars: the Ginetta G61-LT-P3, Ligier JS P320, Duqueine D-08, and the ADESS-03 Evo. These cars could be built from its predecessors using an upgrade kit. The new LMP3 prototypes were used in Asian Le Mans Series, Michelin Le Mans Cup, IMSA VP Racing SportsCar Challenge, European Le Mans Series, and Prototype Cup Germany. LMP3 now used 5.6-litre Nissan engines, increasing horsepower to 340 kW (455 hp).

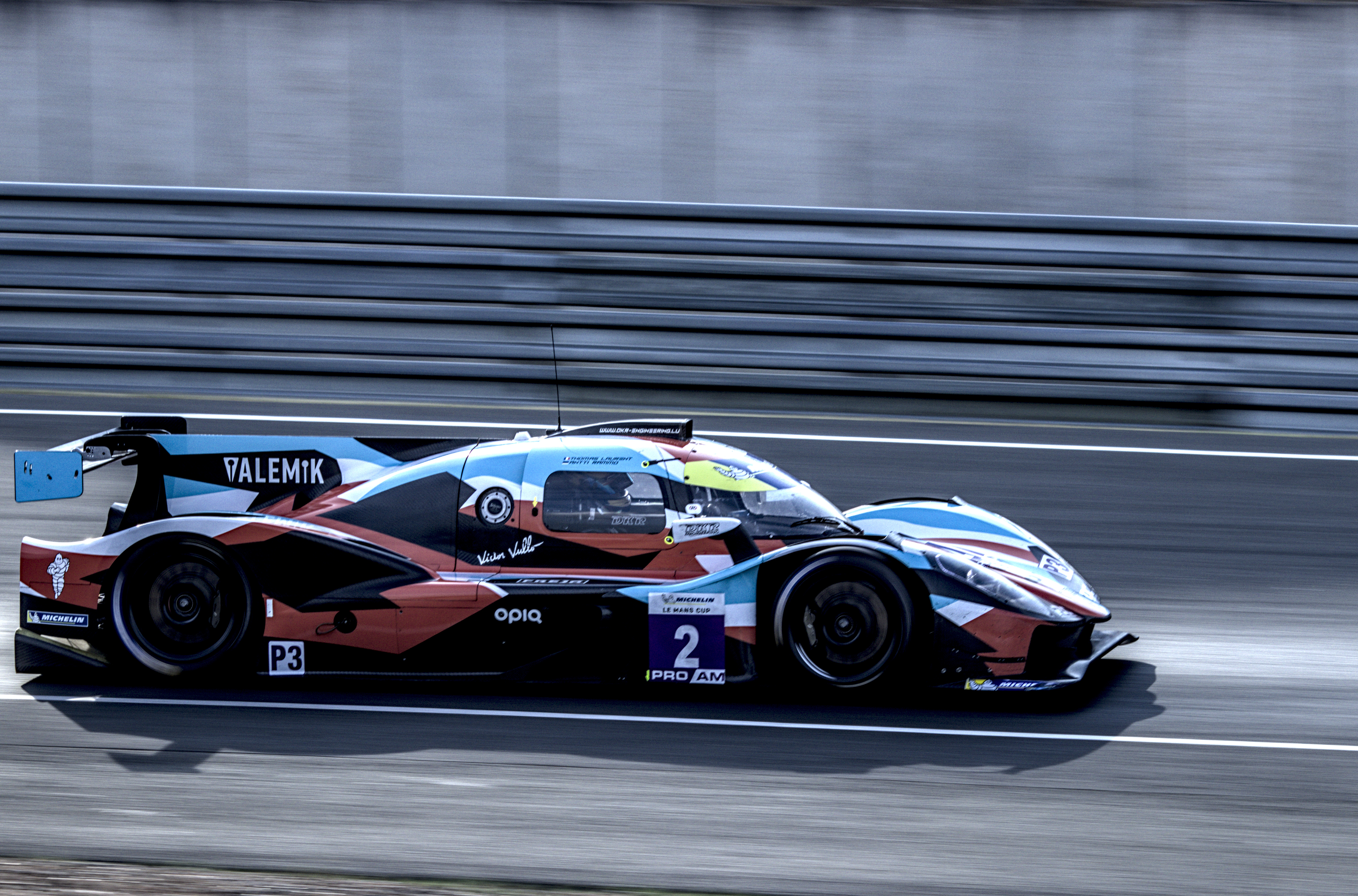
DKR Engineering Ginetta G61-LT-P3 Evo on track qualifying for the 2025 Road to Le Mans

The LMP1 category was replaced by the Le Mans Hypercar class from 2021, after the successive exits of Audi and Porsche from the FIA World Endurance Championship at the end of the 2016 and 2017 seasons, in the aftermath of the Volkswagen emissions scandal. IMSA and the ACO announced that they would merge their respective sports prototype rulesets into one class. This unified prototype class is named differently in the FIA World Endurance Championship and IMSA SportsCar Championship: Hypercar and Grand Touring Prototype (GTP), respectively. This merge allows the Le Mans Hypercars to compete in the IMSA SportsCar Championship in tandem with its sister LMDh cars. LMP (and LMDh) cars have a maximum power of 500 kW (670 hp) and a minimum weight of 1,030 kg (2,270 lb). For 2021 season LMP2 cars were slowed to ensure a lap time difference between the LMP2 and the new Le Mans Hypercar class: the power of the Gibson engine was reduced to 540 bhp and the minimum weight increased by 20 kg to 950 kg. Mirroring the Hypercar category, a single aero kit has been made mandatory for LMP2, limited to the Le Mans specification in the WEC; the ELMS teams have retained the right to fit different aero kits.

From 2025, LMP3 class uses twin-turbocharged 3.5-litre Toyota engines with a power increase to 350 kW (470 hp). Due to the new engine and cooling package, the weight limit was increased to 1,000 kilograms (2,205 lb). New cars were introduced: the Ginetta G61-LT-P3 Evo, Ligier JS P325, Duqueine D09, and the ADESS AD25.

New regulations for LMP2 are planned for 2028, with Gibson set to continue supplying the engines.

== Technical regulations ==
=== LMP1 ===
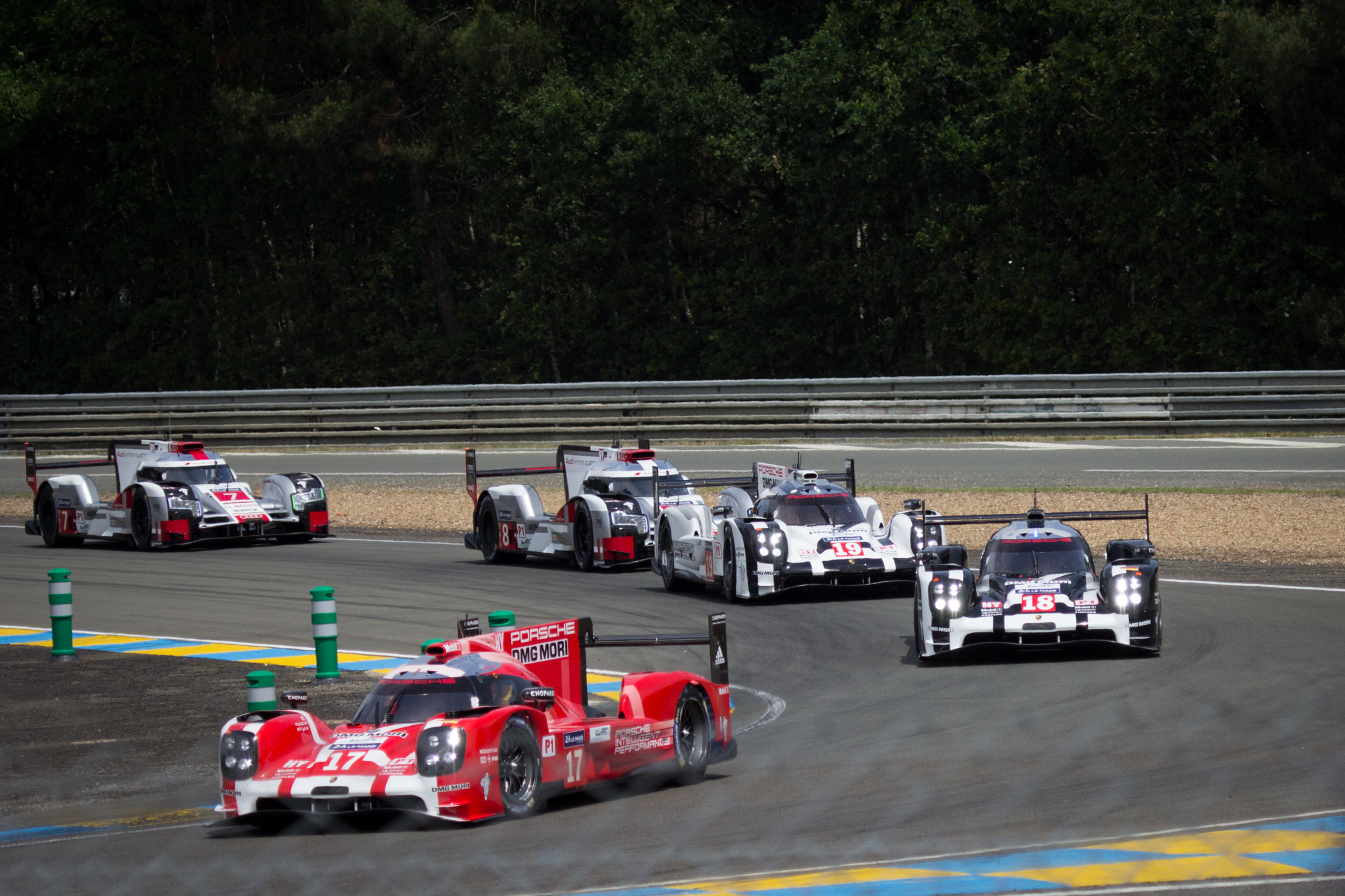
The former LMP1 class competitors, the Porsche 919 Hybrid and Audi R18 e-tron Quattro

2009 Lola-Aston Martin LMP1
Lola-Aston Martin LMP1 at Goodwood Festival of Speed 2009

LMP1
	Hybrid	Non-hybrid
Minimum weight	878 kilograms (1,936 lb)	833 kilograms (1,836 lb)
Maximum length	4,650 millimetres (183 in)	
Minimum width	1,800 millimetres (71 in)	
Maximum width	1,900 millimetres (75 in)	
Engine displacement	no limit	max. 5.5 litres (340 in^{3})
Fuel tank capacity for petrol engines	62.3 litres (16.5 US gal)	75 litres (20 US gal)
For diesel engines	50.1 litres (13.2 US gal)	
Maximum wheel diameter	28 inches (710 mm)	
Maximum wheel width	14 inches (360 mm)	

=== LMP2 ===
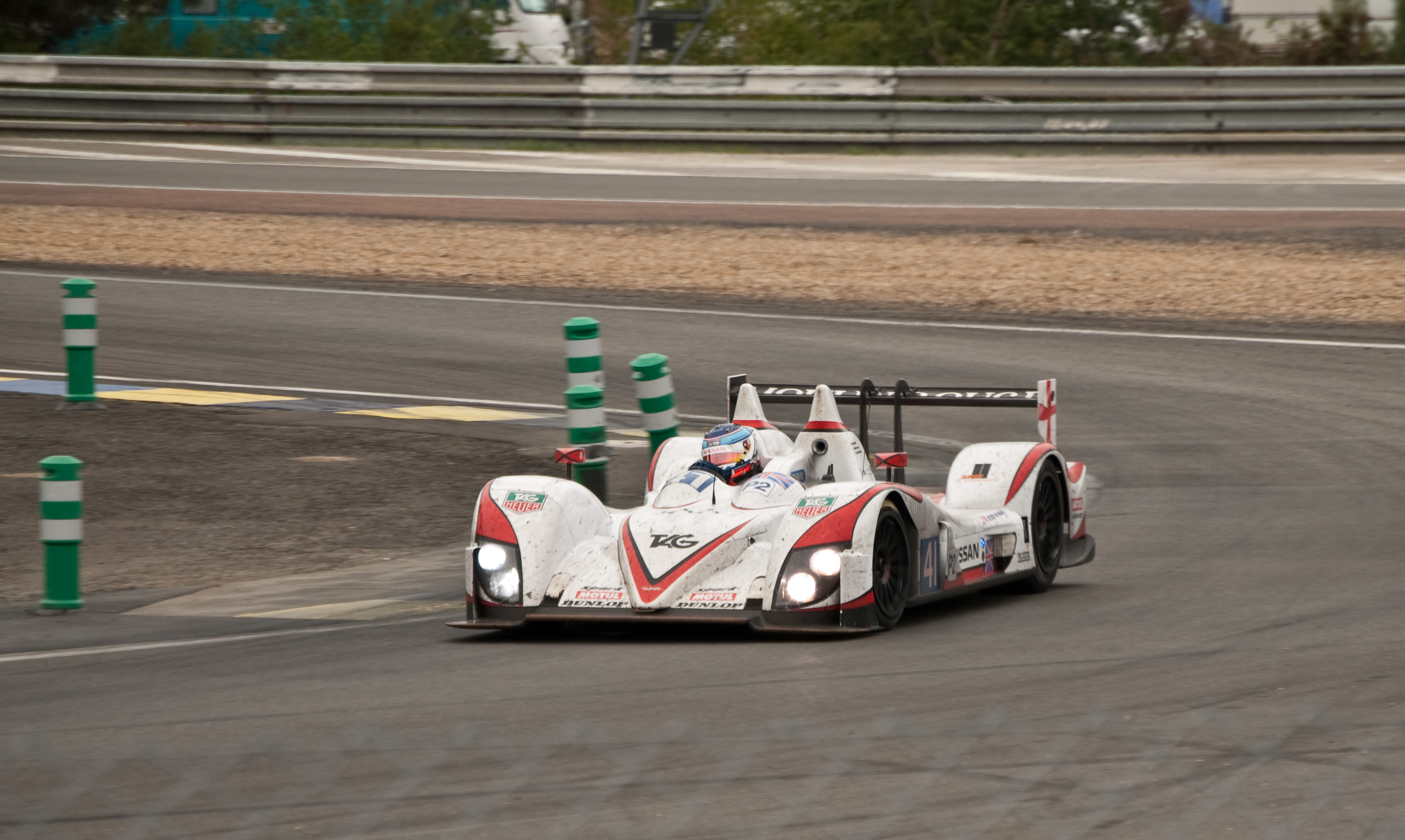
An older LMP2 class competitor, the Greaves Motorsport Zytek Z11SN-Nissan at the 2011 24 Hours of Le Mans

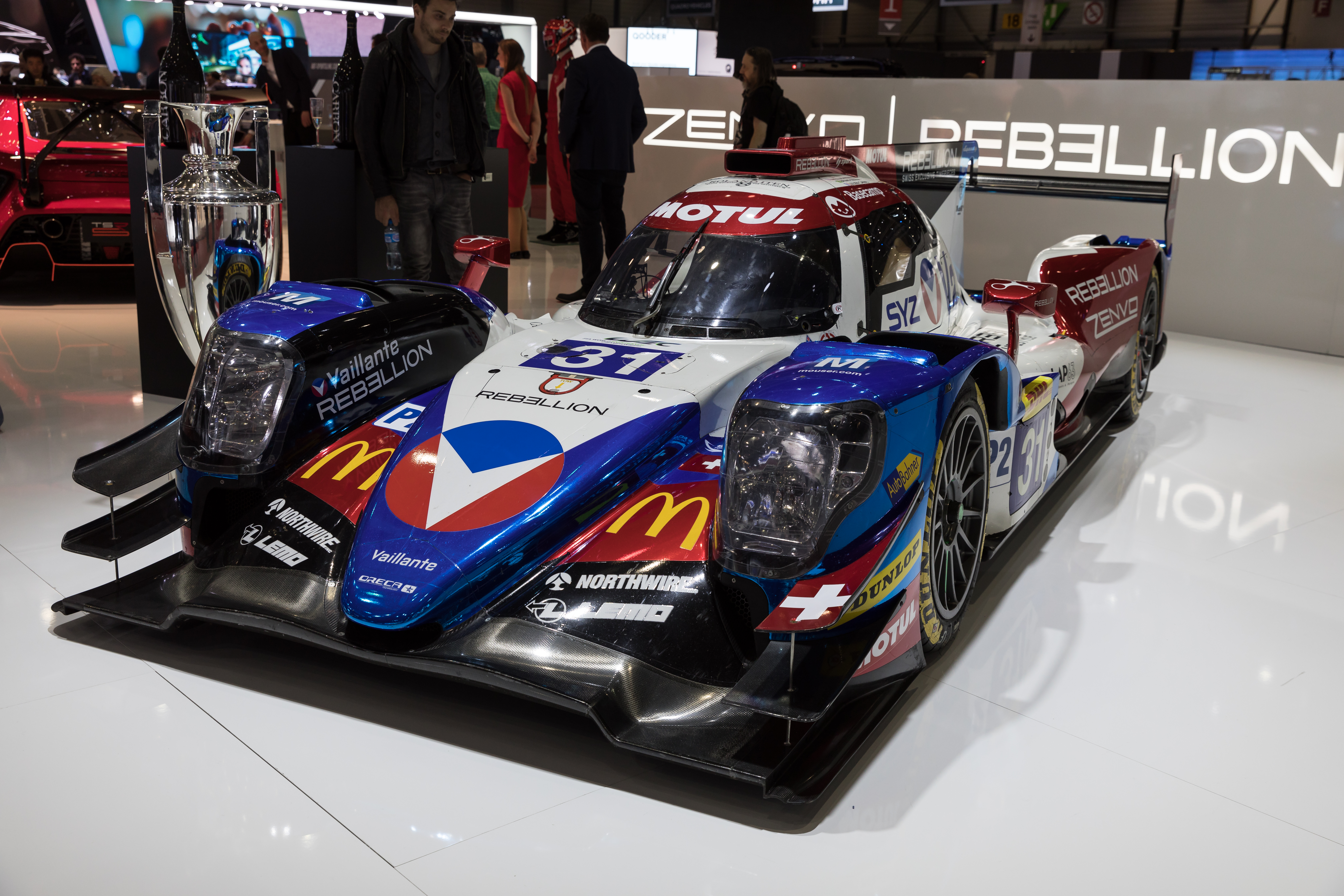
A newer LMP2 class competitor, the Vaillante Rebellion Oreca 07 with LMP2 Endurance Trophy

LMP2
Minimum weight	950 kilograms (2,090 lb)
Maximum length	4,750 millimetres (187 in)
Overall width	1,800 millimetres (71 in) (min) to 1,900 millimetres (75 in) (max)
Maximum Height	1,050 millimetres (41 in)
Engine	4.2 litres (260 in^{3}) V8 naturally-aspirated petrol engine (homologated)
Fuel tank capacity	75 litres (20 US gal)
Maximum wheel diameter	690 millimetres (27 in) front, 715 millimetres (28.1 in) rear
Maximum wheel width	342 millimetres (13.5 in) front, 362 millimetres (14.3 in) rear

=== LMP3 ===
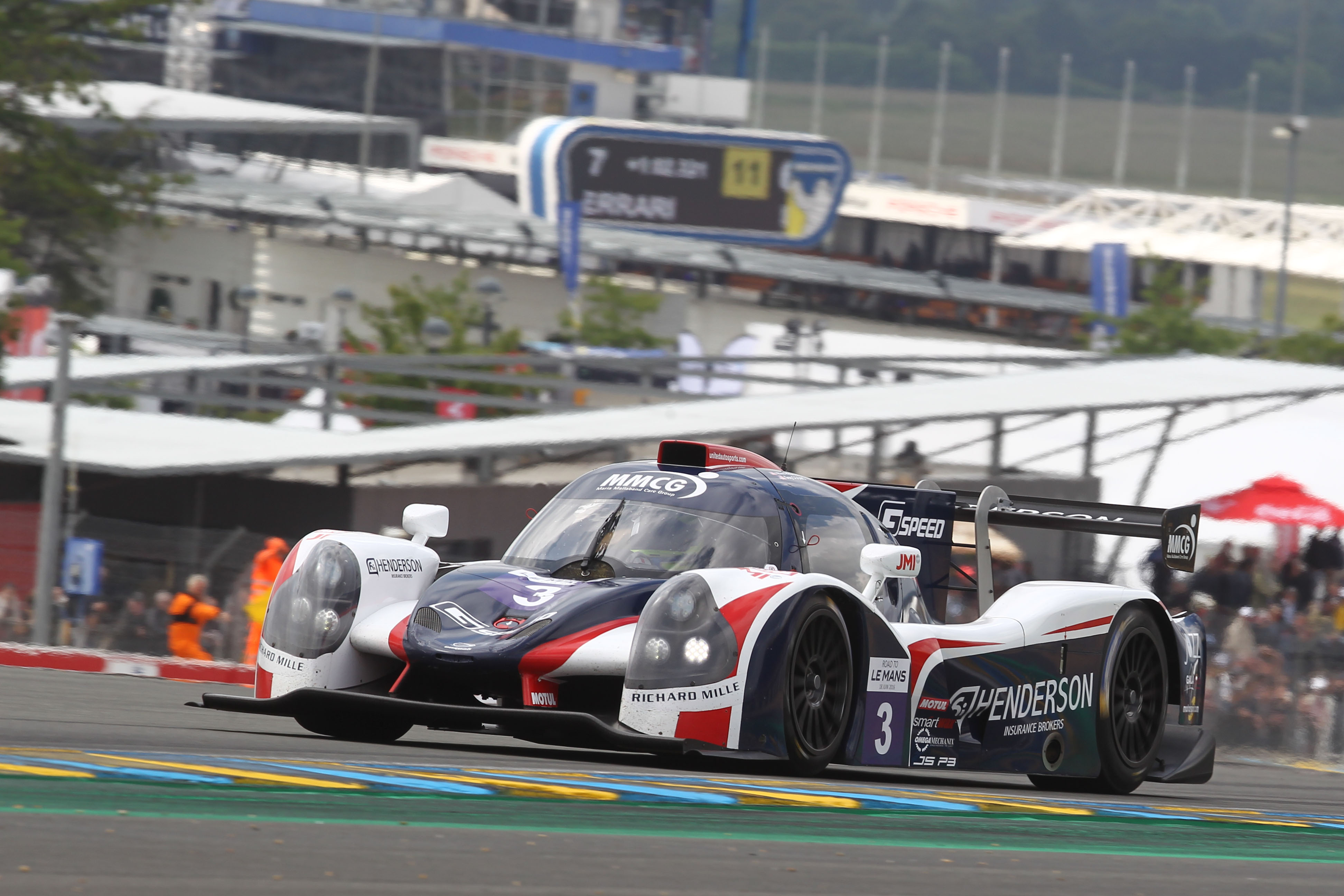
United Autosports Ligier JS P3 at the 2016 Road to Le Mans

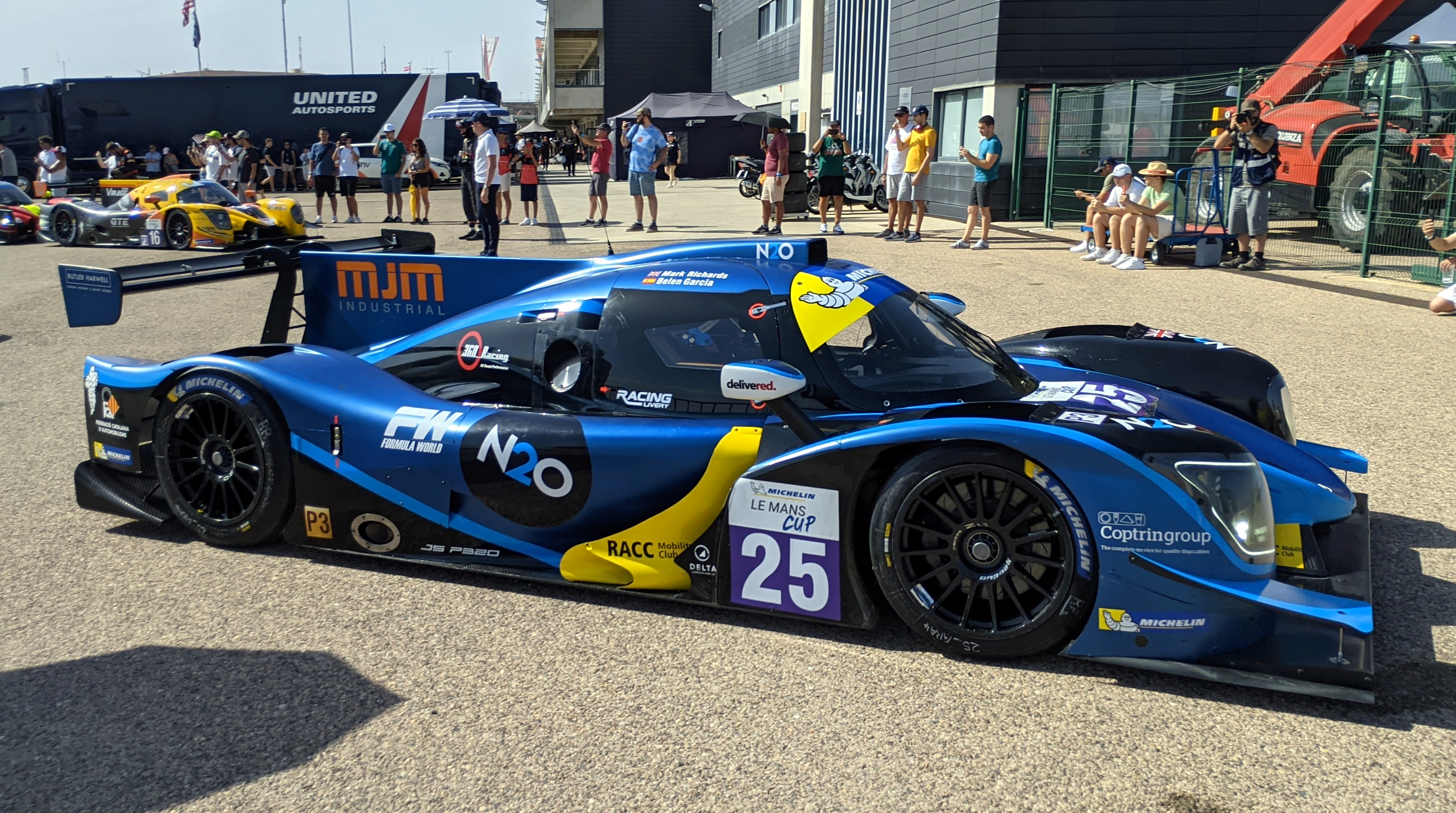
Ligier JS P320 at the 2023 Road to Le Mans

LMP3
Specification	Gen 1	Gen 2	Gen 3
Minimum weight	930 kilograms (2,050 lb)	950 kilograms (2,094 lb)	1,000 kilograms (2,205 lb)
Maximum length	4,650 millimetres (183.1 in)		
Overall width	1,800–1,900 millimetres (70.9–74.8 in)		
Maximum height	1,050 millimetres (41.3 in)		
Engine	5.0L V8 Nissan VK50VE	5.6L V8 Nissan VK56DE	3.5L TT V6 Toyota V35A-FTS
Power	420 hp (313 kW; 426 PS)	455 hp (339 kW; 461 PS)	470 hp (350 kW; 477 PS)
Transmission	Xtrac P1152 6-speed sequential		
Fuel tank capacity	100 litres (26 US gal)		
Maximum wheel diameter	28 inches (710 mm)		
Maximum wheel width	13 inches (330 mm)		

=== LMPC ===
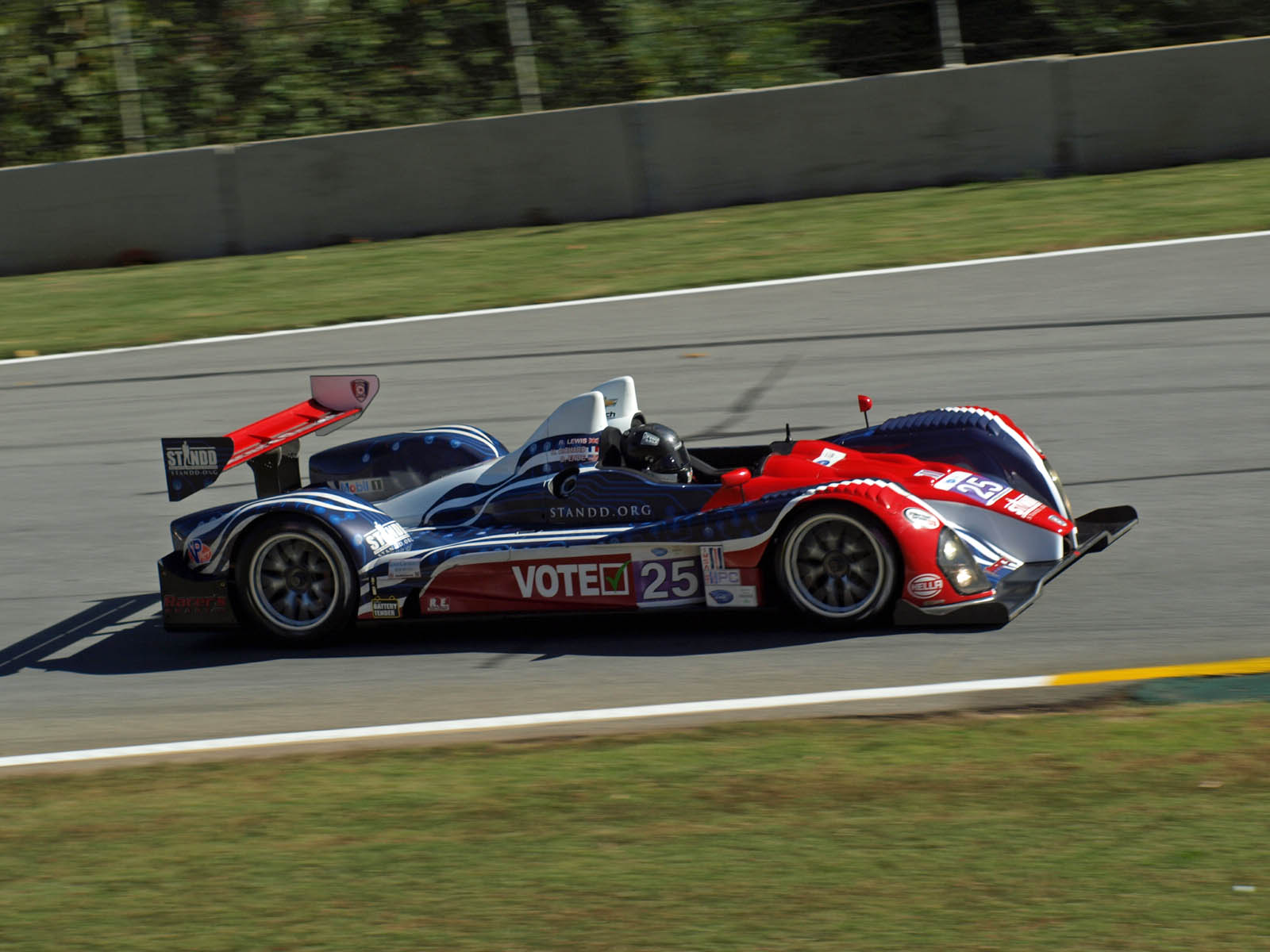
An American LMPC class competitor, the Dempsey Racing Oreca FLM09-Chevrolet at the 2012 Petit Le Mans

LMPC (Le Mans Prototype Challenge) was an earlier entry level class, introduced in 2009, consisting of competitors running identical Oreca FLM09 cars. The class was dropped from the European Le Mans Series in 2014. As the cost of running an LMPC team was found to be comparable to that for an LMP2 team, the class was dropped after the 2017 season in the WeatherTech SportsCar Championship.

== See also ==
- List of Le Mans Prototypes
- Daytona Prototype – Prototype racing car
- Daytona Prototype International (DPi)
- Formula Le Mans – Sportscar racing class
- Group 6 – FIA classification for sports car racing
- Japan Le Mans Challenge
- Rolex Sports Car Series – Former racing series
