= 2001 FIA Sportscar Championship Donington =

Layout of Donington Park

The 2001 FIA Sportscar Championship Donington was the sixith race for the 2001 FIA Sportscar Championship season held at Donington Park and ran a distance of two hours and thirty minutes. It took place on August 26, 2001.

== Official results ==
Class winners in bold. Cars failing to complete 75% of winner's distance marked as Not Classified (NC).

Pos	Class	No	Team	Drivers	Chassis	Tyre	Laps
Pos	Class	No	Team	Drivers	Engine	Tyre	Laps
1	**SR1**	**17**	**(United Kingdom) Team Ascari**	**(United Kingdom) Ben Collins** **(South Africa) Werner Lupberger**	**Ascari A410**	G	**99**
1	**SR1**	**17**	**(United Kingdom) Team Ascari**	**(United Kingdom) Ben Collins** **(South Africa) Werner Lupberger**	**Judd GV4 4.0L V10**	G	**99**
2	SR1	1	(Italy) BMS Scuderia Italia	(Italy) Marco Zadra (France) Jean-Marc Gounon	Ferrari 333 SP	G	99
2	SR1	1	(Italy) BMS Scuderia Italia	(Italy) Marco Zadra (France) Jean-Marc Gounon	Ferrari F310E 4.0 L V12	G	99
3	SR1	8	(Netherlands) Racing for Holland	(Netherlands) Jan Lammers (Netherlands) Val Hillebrand	Dome S101	G	98
3	SR1	8	(Netherlands) Racing for Holland	(Netherlands) Jan Lammers (Netherlands) Val Hillebrand	Judd GV4 4.0L V10	G	98
4	SR1	10	(Germany) Kremer Racing	(United Kingdom) Sam Hancock (Canada) Robbie Stirling	Lola B98/10	G	98
4	SR1	10	(Germany) Kremer Racing	(United Kingdom) Sam Hancock (Canada) Robbie Stirling	Ford 6.0 L V8	G	98
5	SR1	5	(United Kingdom) Den Bla Avis/Team Goh	(Denmark) John Nielsen (Japan) Hiroki Katoh	Dome S101	G	98
5	SR1	5	(United Kingdom) Den Bla Avis/Team Goh	(Denmark) John Nielsen (Japan) Hiroki Katoh	Judd GV4 4.0L V10	G	98
6	SR1	7	(United Kingdom) Redman Bright	(United Kingdom) Mark Smithson (United Kingdom) Peter Owen	Reynard 01Q	A	95
6	SR1	7	(United Kingdom) Redman Bright	(United Kingdom) Mark Smithson (United Kingdom) Peter Owen	Judd GV4 4.0L V10	A	95
7	**SR2**	**61**	**(United Kingdom) Rowan Racing**	**(United Kingdom) Warren Carway** **(United Kingdom) Martin O'Connell**	**Pilbeam MP84**	A	**94**
7	**SR2**	**61**	**(United Kingdom) Rowan Racing**	**(United Kingdom) Warren Carway** **(United Kingdom) Martin O'Connell**	**Nissan 3.0 L V6**	A	**94**
8	SR2	76	SportsRacing Team Sweden	(Sweden) Thed Björk (United States) Larry Oberto	Lola B2K/40	A	94
8	SR2	76	SportsRacing Team Sweden	(Sweden) Thed Björk (United States) Larry Oberto	Nissan 3.0 L V6	A	94
9	SR1	6	(Italy) R&M	(Italy) Mauro Baldi (Italy) Alex Caffi	Riley & Scott Mk III	G	91
9	SR1	6	(Italy) R&M	(Italy) Mauro Baldi (Italy) Alex Caffi	Judd GV4 4.0L V10	G	91
10	SR2	75	(United Kingdom) Team Sovereign	(United Kingdom) Ian Flux (United Kingdom) Mike Millard	Rapier 6	D	89
10	SR2	75	(United Kingdom) Team Sovereign	(United Kingdom) Ian Flux (United Kingdom) Mike Millard	Nissan 3.0 L V6	D	89
11	SR2	99	(France) PiR Competition	(France) Marc Rostan (France) Pierre Bruneau (Italy) Ludovico Manfredi	Debora LMP299	A	87
11	SR2	99	(France) PiR Competition	(France) Marc Rostan (France) Pierre Bruneau (Italy) Ludovico Manfredi	BMW 3.0 L I6	A	87
12	SR2	66	(Italy) Audisio & Benvenuto Racing	(Italy) Roberto Tonetti (Italy) Massimo Saccomanno	Lucchini SR2001	G	83
12	SR2	66	(Italy) Audisio & Benvenuto Racing	(Italy) Roberto Tonetti (Italy) Massimo Saccomanno	Alfa Romeo 3.0 L V6	G	83
13	SR2	72	(Italy) SCI	(Italy) Ranieri Randaccio (Italy) Pasquale Barberio	Lucchini SR2000	G	76
13	SR2	72	(Italy) SCI	(Italy) Ranieri Randaccio (Italy) Pasquale Barberio	Alfa Romeo 3.0L V6	G	76
14	SR2	77	(United Kingdom) Redman Bright	(United Kingdom) Piers Johnson (United Kingdom) Oli Wilkinson	Pilbeam MP84	A	69
14	SR2	77	(United Kingdom) Redman Bright	(United Kingdom) Piers Johnson (United Kingdom) Oli Wilkinson	Nissan 3.0 L V6	A	69
DNF	SR1	2	(Italy) BMS Scuderia Italia	(Italy) Angelo Zadra (Switzerland) Enzo Calderari (Switzerland) Lilian Bryner	Ferrari 333 SP	G	95
DNF	SR1	2	(Italy) BMS Scuderia Italia	(Italy) Angelo Zadra (Switzerland) Enzo Calderari (Switzerland) Lilian Bryner	Ferrari F310E 4.0 L V12	G	95
DNF	SR1	3	(Monaco) GLV Brums	(Italy) Giovanni Lavaggi (United Kingdom) Christian Vann	Ferrari 333 SP	G	81
DNF	SR1	3	(Monaco) GLV Brums	(Italy) Giovanni Lavaggi (United Kingdom) Christian Vann	Judd GV4 4.0L V10	G	81
DNF	SR2	68	(Kenya) Swara Racing	(United Kingdom) Michael Mallock (United Kingdom) Simon Wiseman	Tampolli SR2 RTA-2001	A	74
DNF	SR2	68	(Kenya) Swara Racing	(United Kingdom) Michael Mallock (United Kingdom) Simon Wiseman	Nissan 3.0 L V6	A	74
DNF	SR2	51	(Italy) Lucchini Engineering	(Italy) Denny Zardo (Italy) Mauro Prospero	Lucchini SR2000	P	71
DNF	SR2	51	(Italy) Lucchini Engineering	(Italy) Denny Zardo (Italy) Mauro Prospero	Alfa Romeo 3.0 L V6	P	71
DNF	SR2	59	(Italy) BM Autosport	(Italy) Massimo Monti (Italy) Renato Nobili	Tampolli SR2 RTA-99	P	64
DNF	SR2	59	(Italy) BM Autosport	(Italy) Massimo Monti (Italy) Renato Nobili	Alfa Romeo 3.0 L V6	P	64
DNF	SR2	52	(Italy) Lucchini Engineering	(Italy) Pierguiseppe Peroni (Belgium) Sébastien Ugeux	Lucchini SR2001	P	19
DNF	SR2	52	(Italy) Lucchini Engineering	(Italy) Pierguiseppe Peroni (Belgium) Sébastien Ugeux	Alfa Romeo 3.0 L V6	P	19

== Statistics ==
- Pole Position - #8 Racing For Holland - 1:36.184
- Fastest Lap - #8 Racing For Holland - 1:25.205

FIA Sportscar Championship
Previous race: 2001 FIA Sportscar Championship Magny-Cours	2001 season	Next race: 2001 FIA Sportscar Championship Mondello
