= 2001 FIA Sportscar Championship Monza =

Layout of the Autodromo Nazionale Monza

The 2001 1000 km di Monza was the second race of the 2001 FIA Sportscar Championship season held at Autodromo Nazionale Monza and ran for 1,000 kilometers. It took place on April 22, 2001.

== Official results ==
Class winners in bold. Cars failing to complete 75% of winner's distance marked as Not Classified (NC).

Pos	Class	No	Team	Drivers	Chassis	Tyre	Laps
Pos	Class	No	Team	Drivers	Engine	Tyre	Laps
1	**SR1**	**3**	**(Monaco) GLV Brums**	**(Italy) Giovanni Lavaggi (United Kingdom) Christian Vann**	**Ferrari 333 SP**	G	**173**
1	**SR1**	**3**	**(Monaco) GLV Brums**	**(Italy) Giovanni Lavaggi (United Kingdom) Christian Vann**	**Judd GV4 4.0 L V10**	G	**173**
2	SR1	17	(United Kingdom) Team Ascari	(South Africa) Werner Lupberger (United Kingdom) Ben Collins	Ascari A410	G	173
2	SR1	17	(United Kingdom) Team Ascari	(South Africa) Werner Lupberger (United Kingdom) Ben Collins	Judd GV4 4.0 L V10	G	173
3	SR1	8	(Netherlands) Racing for Holland	(Netherlands) Jan Lammers (Netherlands) Val Hillebrand	Dome S101	A	172
3	SR1	8	(Netherlands) Racing for Holland	(Netherlands) Jan Lammers (Netherlands) Val Hillebrand	Judd GV4 4.0 L V10	A	172
4	SR1	7	(United Kingdom) Redman Bright	(United Kingdom) Mark Smithson (United Kingdom) Peter Owen (United Kingdom) Guy Smith	Reynard 01Q	A	171
4	SR1	7	(United Kingdom) Redman Bright	(United Kingdom) Mark Smithson (United Kingdom) Peter Owen (United Kingdom) Guy Smith	Judd GV4 4.0 L V10	A	171
5	**SR2**	**76**	**SportsRacing Team Sweden**	**(United States) Larry Oberto (Sweden) Thed Björk (Sweden) Stanley Dickens**	**Lola B2K/40**	A	**162**
5	**SR2**	**76**	**SportsRacing Team Sweden**	**(United States) Larry Oberto (Sweden) Thed Björk (Sweden) Stanley Dickens**	**Nissan 3.0 L V6**	A	**162**
6	SR2	51	(Italy) Lucchini Engineering	(Italy) Danny Zardo (Italy) Mauro Prospero	Lucchini SR2000	P	157
6	SR2	51	(Italy) Lucchini Engineering	(Italy) Danny Zardo (Italy) Mauro Prospero	Alfa Romeo 3.0 L V6	P	157
7	**GT**	**106**	**(Germany) Seikel Motorsport**	**(Italy) Fabio Babini (Italy) Gabrio Rosa (Italy) Fabio Rosa**	**Porsche 911 GT3**	Y	**155**
7	**GT**	**106**	**(Germany) Seikel Motorsport**	**(Italy) Fabio Babini (Italy) Gabrio Rosa (Italy) Fabio Rosa**	**Porsche 3.6 L F6**	Y	**155**
8	GT	101	(Italy) Ruggero Grassi	(Italy) Paul Annasi Muenz (Italy) Ruggero Grassi	Porsche 911 GT2	P	154
8	GT	101	(Italy) Ruggero Grassi	(Italy) Paul Annasi Muenz (Italy) Ruggero Grassi	Porsche 3.6 L F6	P	154
9	SR2	53	(Italy) Siliprandi	(Italy) Pasquale Barberio (Italy) Ezio Mazza	Lucchini SR2-99	A	152
9	SR2	53	(Italy) Siliprandi	(Italy) Pasquale Barberio (Italy) Ezio Mazza	Alfa Romeo 3.0 L V6	A	152
10	GT	108	(Italy) AB Motorsport	(Italy) Renato Premoli (Italy) Antonio de Castro (Italy) Luca Cattaneo	Porsche 911 GT3	P	151
10	GT	108	(Italy) AB Motorsport	(Italy) Renato Premoli (Italy) Antonio de Castro (Italy) Luca Cattaneo	Porsche 3.6 L F6	P	151
11	GT	107	(Switzerland) Italo Frignani	(Switzerland) Italo Frignani (Italy) Paolo Rapetti (Switzerland) Renato Dotta	Porsche 911 GT3	P	151
11	GT	107	(Switzerland) Italo Frignani	(Switzerland) Italo Frignani (Italy) Paolo Rapetti (Switzerland) Renato Dotta	Porsche 3.6 L F6	P	151
12	GT	109	(Italy) Roberto Zecca	(Switzerland) Massimo Cattori (Italy) Roberto Zecca (Switzerland) Ivan Jacoma	Porsche 911 GT2	P	149
12	GT	109	(Italy) Roberto Zecca	(Switzerland) Massimo Cattori (Italy) Roberto Zecca (Switzerland) Ivan Jacoma	Porsche 3.6 L F6	P	149
13	GT	104	(Italy) Ebimotors	(Italy) Dario Cerati (Italy) Mario Sala	Porsche 911 GT3	P	147
13	GT	104	(Italy) Ebimotors	(Italy) Dario Cerati (Italy) Mario Sala	Porsche 3.6 L F6	P	147
14	GT	103	(Italy) Ebimotors	(Italy) Maurizio Monforte (Italy) Alessandro Savi	Porsche 911 GT3	P	135
14	GT	103	(Italy) Ebimotors	(Italy) Maurizio Monforte (Italy) Alessandro Savi	Porsche 3.6 L F6	P	135
15	SR2	58	(Belgium) EBRT Schroeder	(Belgium) Pierre Merche (United Kingdom) Ian Khan (United Kingdom) Martin Henderson	Pilbeam MP84	D	124
15	SR2	58	(Belgium) EBRT Schroeder	(Belgium) Pierre Merche (United Kingdom) Ian Khan (United Kingdom) Martin Henderson	Nissan 3.0 L V6	D	124
16	GT	110	(Italy) MAC Racing	(Italy) Maurizio Strada (Italy) Massimo Morini (Italy) Guido Daccò	Porsche 911 GT3	D	123
16	GT	110	(Italy) MAC Racing	(Italy) Maurizio Strada (Italy) Massimo Morini (Italy) Guido Daccò	Porsche 3.6 L F6	D	123
NC	SR2	66	(Italy) Audisio & Benvenuto Racing	(Italy) Roberto Tonetti (Italy) Massimo Saccomanno	Lucchini SR2001	G	58
NC	SR2	66	(Italy) Audisio & Benvenuto Racing	(Italy) Roberto Tonetti (Italy) Massimo Saccomanno	Alfa Romeo 3.0 L V6	G	58
DNF	SR1	6	(Italy) R&M	(Italy) Mauro Baldi (Italy) Ivan Capelli	Riley & Scott Mk III	G	135
DNF	SR1	6	(Italy) R&M	(Italy) Mauro Baldi (Italy) Ivan Capelli	Judd GV4 4.0 L V10	G	135
DNF	SR1	16	(France) Pescarolo Sport	(France) Laurent Redon (France) Jean-Christophe Boullion (France) Sébastien Bourdais	Courage C60	G	131
DNF	SR1	16	(France) Pescarolo Sport	(France) Laurent Redon (France) Jean-Christophe Boullion (France) Sébastien Bourdais	Peugeot A32 3.2 L Turbo V6	G	131
DNF	SR1	2	(Italy) BMS Scuderia Italia	(Switzerland) Lilian Bryner (Switzerland) Enzo Calderari (Italy) Marco Zadra (Italy) Angelo Zadra	Ferrari 333 SP	G	83
DNF	SR1	2	(Italy) BMS Scuderia Italia	(Switzerland) Lilian Bryner (Switzerland) Enzo Calderari (Italy) Marco Zadra (Italy) Angelo Zadra	Ferrari F310E 4.0 L V12	G	83
DNF	SR2	99	(France) PiR Competition	(France) Marc Rostan (Italy) Arturo Merzario (France) Pierre Bruneau	Debora LMP299	A	81
DNF	SR2	99	(France) PiR Competition	(France) Marc Rostan (Italy) Arturo Merzario (France) Pierre Bruneau	BMW 3.0 L I6	A	81
DNF	SR1	10	(Germany) Kremer Racing	(Belgium) Didier de Radiguès (United Kingdom) Sam Hancock (South Africa) Gary Formato	Lola B98/10	G	63
DNF	SR1	10	(Germany) Kremer Racing	(Belgium) Didier de Radiguès (United Kingdom) Sam Hancock (South Africa) Gary Formato	Ford 4.0 L V8	G	63
DNF	SR1	5	(Denmark) Den Bla Avis	(Denmark) John Nielsen (Japan) Hiroki Katoh	Dome S101	G	57
DNF	SR1	5	(Denmark) Den Bla Avis	(Denmark) John Nielsen (Japan) Hiroki Katoh	Judd GV4 4.0 L V10	G	57
DNF	SR2	59	(Italy) BM Autosport	(Italy) Massimo Monti (Italy) Renato Nobili	Tampolli SR2 RTA-99	G	38
DNF	SR2	59	(Italy) BM Autosport	(Italy) Massimo Monti (Italy) Renato Nobili	Alfa Romeo 3.0 L V6	G	38
DNF	SR2	72	(Italy) SCI	(Italy) Leonardo Maddalena (Italy) Ranieri Randaccio	Lucchini SR2000	A	34
DNF	SR2	72	(Italy) SCI	(Italy) Leonardo Maddalena (Italy) Ranieri Randaccio	Alfa Romeo 3.0 L V6	A	34
DNF	SR1	1	(Italy) BMS Scuderia Italia	(Italy) Marco Zadra (Italy) Christian Pescatori	Ferrari 333 SP	G	29
DNF	SR1	1	(Italy) BMS Scuderia Italia	(Italy) Marco Zadra (Italy) Christian Pescatori	Ferrari F310E 4.0 L V12	G	29
DNF	SR2	65	(Italy) Audisio & Benvenuto Racing	(Italy) Bruno Corradi (Italy) Giuseppe Chiminelli (Italy) Antonio Vallebona	Lucchini SR2-99	A	12
DNF	SR2	65	(Italy) Audisio & Benvenuto Racing	(Italy) Bruno Corradi (Italy) Giuseppe Chiminelli (Italy) Antonio Vallebona	Alfa Romeo 3.0 L V6	A	12
DNF	SR2	50	(Italy) Lucchini Engineering	(Italy) Piergiuseppe Peroni (Italy) Filippo Francioni (Italy) Raffaele Raimondi	Lucchini SR2001	P	12
DNF	SR2	50	(Italy) Lucchini Engineering	(Italy) Piergiuseppe Peroni (Italy) Filippo Francioni (Italy) Raffaele Raimondi	Alfa Romeo 3.0 L V6	P	12
DNF	GT	105	(Italy) MAC Racing	(Italy) Luciano Tamburini (Italy) Francesco Virdis (Italy) Mauro Simoncini	Porsche 911 GT3	D	6
DNF	GT	105	(Italy) MAC Racing	(Italy) Luciano Tamburini (Italy) Francesco Virdis (Italy) Mauro Simoncini	Porsche 3.6 L F6	D	6
DNF	SR2	69	(Kenya) Swara Racing	(United Kingdom) Simon Wiseman (United Kingdom) Michael Mallock (United Kingdom) Ben McLoughlin	Pilbeam MP84	A	5
DNF	SR2	69	(Kenya) Swara Racing	(United Kingdom) Simon Wiseman (United Kingdom) Michael Mallock (United Kingdom) Ben McLoughlin	Nissan 3.0 L V6	A	5
DNS	SR1	25	(Italy) Conrero	(Italy) Alex Caffi (Italy) Angelo Lancelotti (Switzerland) Andrea Chiesa	Riley & Scott Mk III	A	0
DNS	SR1	25	(Italy) Conrero	(Italy) Alex Caffi (Italy) Angelo Lancelotti (Switzerland) Andrea Chiesa	Ford 4.0 L V8	A	0

FIA Sportscar Championship
Previous race: 2001 FIA Sportscar Championship Barcelona	2001 season	Next race: 2001 FIA Sportscar Championship Spa
