= 2001 FIA Sportscar Championship Magny-Cours =

Layout of Circuit de Nevers Magny-Cours (1992–2002)

The 2001 FIA Sportscar Championship Magny-Cours was the fifth race for the 2001 FIA Sportscar Championship season held at Circuit de Nevers Magny-Cours and ran a distance of two hours and thirty minutes. It took place on July 29, 2001.

== Official results ==
Class winners in bold. Cars failing to complete 75% of winner's distance marked as Not Classified (NC).

Pos	Class	No	Team	Drivers	Chassis	Tyre	Laps
Pos	Class	No	Team	Drivers	Engine	Tyre	Laps
1	**SR1**	**16**	**(France) Pescarolo Sport**	**(France) Jean-Christophe Boullion** **(France) Laurent Redon**	**Courage C60**	G	**94**
1	**SR1**	**16**	**(France) Pescarolo Sport**	**(France) Jean-Christophe Boullion** **(France) Laurent Redon**	**Peugeot A32 3.2 L Turbo V6**	G	**94**
2	SR1	1	(Italy) BMS Scuderia Italia	(Italy) Marco Zadra (Italy) Christian Pescatori	Ferrari 333 SP	G	94
2	SR1	1	(Italy) BMS Scuderia Italia	(Italy) Marco Zadra (Italy) Christian Pescatori	Ferrari F310E 4.0 L V12	G	94
3	SR1	5	(United Kingdom) Den Bla Avis/Team Goh	(Denmark) John Nielsen (Japan) Hiroki Katoh	Dome S101	G	94
3	SR1	5	(United Kingdom) Den Bla Avis/Team Goh	(Denmark) John Nielsen (Japan) Hiroki Katoh	Judd GV4 4.0L V10	G	94
4	SR1	17	(United Kingdom) Team Ascari	(United Kingdom) Ben Collins (South Africa) Werner Lupberger	Ascari A410	G	93
4	SR1	17	(United Kingdom) Team Ascari	(United Kingdom) Ben Collins (South Africa) Werner Lupberger	Judd GV4 4.0L V10	G	93
5	SR1	2	(Italy) BMS Scuderia Italia	(Italy) Angelo Zadra (Switzerland) Enzo Calderari (Switzerland) Lilian Bryner	Ferrari 333 SP	G	92
5	SR1	2	(Italy) BMS Scuderia Italia	(Italy) Angelo Zadra (Switzerland) Enzo Calderari (Switzerland) Lilian Bryner	Ferrari F310E 4.0 L V12	G	92
6	SR1	8	(Netherlands) Racing for Holland	(Netherlands) Jan Lammers (Netherlands) Val Hillebrand	Dome S101	A	92
6	SR1	8	(Netherlands) Racing for Holland	(Netherlands) Jan Lammers (Netherlands) Val Hillebrand	Judd GV4 4.0L V10	A	92
7	**SR2**	**61**	**(United Kingdom) Rowan Racing**	**(United Kingdom) Warren Carway** **(United Kingdom) Martin O'Connell**	**Pilbeam MP84**	A	**89**
7	**SR2**	**61**	**(United Kingdom) Rowan Racing**	**(United Kingdom) Warren Carway** **(United Kingdom) Martin O'Connell**	**Nissan 3.0 L V6**	A	**89**
8	SR1	7	(United Kingdom) Redman Bright	(United Kingdom) Mark Smithson (United Kingdom) Peter Owen	Reynard 01Q	A	89
8	SR1	7	(United Kingdom) Redman Bright	(United Kingdom) Mark Smithson (United Kingdom) Peter Owen	Judd GV4 4.0L V10	A	89
9	SR1	6	(Italy) R&M	(Italy) Mauro Baldi (Italy) Alex Caffi	Riley & Scott Mk III	G	85
9	SR1	6	(Italy) R&M	(Italy) Mauro Baldi (Italy) Alex Caffi	Judd GV4 4.0L V10	G	85
10	SR2	51	(Italy) Lucchini Engineering	(Italy) Denny Zardo (Italy) Mauro Prospero	Lucchini SR2000	P	83
10	SR2	51	(Italy) Lucchini Engineering	(Italy) Denny Zardo (Italy) Mauro Prospero	Alfa Romeo 3.0 L V6	P	83
11	SR2	59	(Italy) BM Autosport	(Italy) Massimo Monti (Italy) Renato Nobili	Tampolli SR2 RTA-99	P	78
11	SR2	59	(Italy) BM Autosport	(Italy) Massimo Monti (Italy) Renato Nobili	Alfa Romeo 3.0 L V6	P	78
DNF	SR2	52	(Italy) Lucchini Engineering	(Italy) Pierguiseppe Peroni (France) Jean-Bernard Bouvet	Lucchini SR2001	P	85
DNF	SR2	52	(Italy) Lucchini Engineering	(Italy) Pierguiseppe Peroni (France) Jean-Bernard Bouvet	Alfa Romeo 3.0 L V6	P	85
DNF	SR2	72	(Italy) SCI	(Italy) Ranieri Randaccio (Italy) Pasquale Barberio	Lucchini SR2000	G	77
DNF	SR2	72	(Italy) SCI	(Italy) Ranieri Randaccio (Italy) Pasquale Barberio	Alfa Romeo 3.0L V6	G	77
DNF	SR2	75	(United Kingdom) Team Sovereign	(United Kingdom) Ian Flux (United Kingdom) Mike Millard	Rapier 6	D	50
DNF	SR2	75	(United Kingdom) Team Sovereign	(United Kingdom) Ian Flux (United Kingdom) Mike Millard	Nissan 3.0 L V6	D	50
DNF	SR1	3	(Monaco) GLV Brums	(Italy) Giovanni Lavaggi (United Kingdom) Christian Vann	Ferrari 333 SP	G	45
DNF	SR1	3	(Monaco) GLV Brums	(Italy) Giovanni Lavaggi (United Kingdom) Christian Vann	Judd GV4 4.0L V10	G	45
DNF	SR1	10	(Germany) Kremer Racing	(United Kingdom) Sam Hancock (France) Jean-Marc Gounon	Lola B98/10	G	40
DNF	SR1	10	(Germany) Kremer Racing	(United Kingdom) Sam Hancock (France) Jean-Marc Gounon	Ford 6.0 L V8	G	40
DNF	SR2	66	(Italy) Audisio & Benvenuto Racing	(Italy) Roberto Tonetti (Italy) Massimo Saccomanno	Lucchini SR2001	G	29
DNF	SR2	66	(Italy) Audisio & Benvenuto Racing	(Italy) Roberto Tonetti (Italy) Massimo Saccomanno	Alfa Romeo 3.0 L V6	G	29
DNF	SR2	99	(France) PiR Competition	(France) Marc Rostan (France) Pierre Bruneau (Italy) Ludovico Manfredi	Debora LMP299	A	27
DNF	SR2	99	(France) PiR Competition	(France) Marc Rostan (France) Pierre Bruneau (Italy) Ludovico Manfredi	BMW 3.0 L I6	A	27
DNF	SR2	55	(Austria) Renauer Motorsport	(Germany) Wolfgang Kaufmann (Austria) Norbert Groer (Austria) Hannes Gsell	Tampolli SR2 RTA-2001	A	22
DNF	SR2	55	(Austria) Renauer Motorsport	(Germany) Wolfgang Kaufmann (Austria) Norbert Groer (Austria) Hannes Gsell	Alfa Romeo 3.0 L V6	A	22
DNF	SR2	68	(Kenya) Swara Racing	(United Kingdom) Michael Mallock (United Kingdom) Simon Wiseman	Tampolli SR2 RTA-2001	A	13
DNF	SR2	68	(Kenya) Swara Racing	(United Kingdom) Michael Mallock (United Kingdom) Simon Wiseman	Nissan 3.0 L V6	A	13
DSQ	SR2	76	SportsRacing Team Sweden	(Sweden) Thed Björk (United States) Larry Oberto	Lola B2K/40	A	83
DSQ	SR2	76	SportsRacing Team Sweden	(Sweden) Thed Björk (United States) Larry Oberto	Nissan 3.0 L V6	A	83
DNS	SR1	21	(Italy) Team Durango	(Italy) Andrea de Lorenzi (France) Soheil Ayari	GMS Durango LMP1	G	0
DNS	SR1	21	(Italy) Team Durango	(Italy) Andrea de Lorenzi (France) Soheil Ayari	BMW 4.0 L V8	G	0

== Statistics ==
- Pole Position - #5 Den Bla Avis/Team Goh - 1:28.657
- Fastest Lap - #10 Kremer Racing - 1:30.460

FIA Sportscar Championship
Previous race: 2001 FIA Sportscar Championship Brno	2001 season	Next race: 2001 FIA Sportscar Championship Donington
