= 2001 FIA Sportscar Championship Nürburgring =

Layout of Nürburgring Grand Prix Strecke (1995–2001)

The 2001 FIA Sportscar Championship Nürburgring was the eighth and final race for the 2001 FIA Sportscar Championship season held at Nürburgring and ran a distance of two hours and thirty minutes. It took place on September 16, 2001.

== Official results ==
Class winners in bold. Cars failing to complete 75% of winner's distance marked as Not Classified (NC).

Pos	Class	No	Team	Drivers	Chassis	Tyre	Laps
Pos	Class	No	Team	Drivers	Engine	Tyre	Laps
1	**SR1**	**8**	**(Netherlands) Racing for Holland**	**(Netherlands) Jan Lammers** **(Netherlands) Val Hillebrand**	**Dome S101**	G	**90**
1	**SR1**	**8**	**(Netherlands) Racing for Holland**	**(Netherlands) Jan Lammers** **(Netherlands) Val Hillebrand**	**Judd GV4 4.0 L V10**	G	**90**
2	SR1	16	(France) Pescarolo Sport	(France) Jean-Christophe Boullion (France) Boris Derichebourg	Courage C60	G	90
2	SR1	16	(France) Pescarolo Sport	(France) Jean-Christophe Boullion (France) Boris Derichebourg	Peugeot A32 3.2 L Turbo V6	G	90
3	SR1	5	(United Kingdom) Den Bla Avis/Team Goh	(Denmark) John Nielsen (Japan) Hiroki Katoh	Dome S101	G	88
3	SR1	5	(United Kingdom) Den Bla Avis/Team Goh	(Denmark) John Nielsen (Japan) Hiroki Katoh	Judd GV4 4.0 L V10	G	88
4	**SR2**	**76**	**SportsRacing Team Sweden**	**(Sweden) Thed Björk** **(United States) Larry Oberto**	**Lola B2K/40**	A	**86**
4	**SR2**	**76**	**SportsRacing Team Sweden**	**(Sweden) Thed Björk** **(United States) Larry Oberto**	**Nissan (AER) VQL 3.0 L V6**	A	**86**
5	SR2	66	(Italy) Audisio & Benvenuto Racing	(Italy) Roberto Tonetti (Italy) Massimo Saccomanno	Lucchini SR2001	G	83
5	SR2	66	(Italy) Audisio & Benvenuto Racing	(Italy) Roberto Tonetti (Italy) Massimo Saccomanno	Alfa Romeo 3.0 L V6	G	83
6	SR2	52	(Italy) Lucchini Engineering	(Italy) Pierguiseppe Peroni (Italy) Raffaele Raimondi	Lucchini SR2001	P	82
6	SR2	52	(Italy) Lucchini Engineering	(Italy) Pierguiseppe Peroni (Italy) Raffaele Raimondi	Alfa Romeo 3.0 L V6	P	82
7	SR2	72	(Italy) SCI	(Italy) Ranieri Randaccio (Italy) Pasquale Barberio	Lucchini SR2000	G	80
7	SR2	72	(Italy) SCI	(Italy) Ranieri Randaccio (Italy) Pasquale Barberio	Alfa Romeo 3.0L V6	G	80
8	SR2	55	(Austria) Renauer Motorsport	(Germany) Wolfgang Kaufmann (Austria) Norbert Groer (Austria) Hannes Gsell	Tampolli SR2 RTA-2001	A	80
8	SR2	55	(Austria) Renauer Motorsport	(Germany) Wolfgang Kaufmann (Austria) Norbert Groer (Austria) Hannes Gsell	Alfa Romeo 3.0 L V6	A	80
9	SR2	99	(France) PiR Competition	(France) Marc Rostan (France) Pierre Bruneau	Debora LMP299	A	74
9	SR2	99	(France) PiR Competition	(France) Marc Rostan (France) Pierre Bruneau	BMW 3.0 L I6	A	74
10	SR2	75	(United Kingdom) Team Sovereign	(United Kingdom) Ian Flux (United Kingdom) Mike Millard	Rapier 6	D	73
10	SR2	75	(United Kingdom) Team Sovereign	(United Kingdom) Ian Flux (United Kingdom) Mike Millard	Nissan (AER) VQL 3.0 L V6	D	73
11	SR1	1	(Italy) BMS Scuderia Italia	(Italy) Marco Zadra (Italy) Christian Pescatori	Ferrari 333 SP	G	72
11	SR1	1	(Italy) BMS Scuderia Italia	(Italy) Marco Zadra (Italy) Christian Pescatori	Ferrari F130E 4.0 L V12	G	72
12	SR2	69	(Kenya) Swara Racing	(United Kingdom) Simon Wiseman (United Kingdom) "Frederico Careca"	Pilbeam MP84	A	70
12	SR2	69	(Kenya) Swara Racing	(United Kingdom) Simon Wiseman (United Kingdom) "Frederico Careca"	Nissan (AER) VQL 3.0 L V6	A	70
DNF	SR1	2	(Italy) BMS Scuderia Italia	(Italy) Angelo Zadra (Switzerland) Enzo Calderari (Switzerland) Lilian Bryner	Ferrari 333 SP	G	85
DNF	SR1	2	(Italy) BMS Scuderia Italia	(Italy) Angelo Zadra (Switzerland) Enzo Calderari (Switzerland) Lilian Bryner	Ferrari F130E 4.0 L V12	G	85
DNF	SR1	7	(United Kingdom) Redman Bright	(United Kingdom) Mark Smithson (United Kingdom) Peter Owen	Reynard 01Q	A	83
DNF	SR1	7	(United Kingdom) Redman Bright	(United Kingdom) Mark Smithson (United Kingdom) Peter Owen	Judd GV4 4.0L V10	A	83
DNF	SR2	61	(United Kingdom) Rowan Racing	(United Kingdom) Warren Carway (United Kingdom) Martin O'Connell	Pilbeam MP84	A	67
DNF	SR2	61	(United Kingdom) Rowan Racing	(United Kingdom) Warren Carway (United Kingdom) Martin O'Connell	Nissan (AER) VQL 3.0 L V6	A	67
DNF	SR1	10	(Germany) Kremer Racing	(United Kingdom) Sam Hancock (France) Jean-Marc Gounon	Lola B98/10	G	63
DNF	SR1	10	(Germany) Kremer Racing	(United Kingdom) Sam Hancock (France) Jean-Marc Gounon	Ford 6.0 L V8	G	63
DNF	SR2	53	(Italy) Siliprandi	(Italy) Pasquale Barberio (Italy) Ezio Mazza	Lucchini SR2-99	A	26
DNF	SR2	53	(Italy) Siliprandi	(Italy) Pasquale Barberio (Italy) Ezio Mazza	Alfa Romeo 3.0 L V6	A	26
DNF	SR1	6	(Italy) R&M	(Italy) Mauro Baldi (Italy) Alex Caffi	Riley & Scott Mk III	G	25
DNF	SR1	6	(Italy) R&M	(Italy) Mauro Baldi (Italy) Alex Caffi	Judd GV4 4.0L V10	G	25
DNF	SR2	68	(Kenya) Swara Racing	(United Kingdom) Michael Mallock (United Kingdom) Phil Andrews	Tampolli SR2 RTA-2001	A	24
DNF	SR2	68	(Kenya) Swara Racing	(United Kingdom) Michael Mallock (United Kingdom) Phil Andrews	Nissan (AER) VQL 3.0 L V6	A	24
DNF	SR2	65	(Italy) Audisio & Benvenuto Racing	(Italy) Giuseppe Chiminelli (Italy) Ivano Giuliani	Lucchini SR2-99	A	15
DNF	SR2	65	(Italy) Audisio & Benvenuto Racing	(Italy) Giuseppe Chiminelli (Italy) Ivano Giuliani	Alfa Romeo 3.0 L V6	A	15
DNF	SR1	3	(Monaco) GLV Brums	(Italy) Giovanni Lavaggi (United Kingdom) Bob Berridge (France) Xavier Pompidou	Ferrari 333 SP	G	7
DNF	SR1	3	(Monaco) GLV Brums	(Italy) Giovanni Lavaggi (United Kingdom) Bob Berridge (France) Xavier Pompidou	Judd GV4 4.0 L V10	G	7
DSQ	SR1	17	(United Kingdom) Team Ascari	(United Kingdom) Ben Collins (South Africa) Werner Lupberger	Ascari A410	G	89
DSQ	SR1	17	(United Kingdom) Team Ascari	(United Kingdom) Ben Collins (South Africa) Werner Lupberger	Judd GV4 4.0 L V10	G	89
DNS	SR1	15	(Germany) Konrad Motorsport	(Austria) Franz Konrad (Germany) Ralf Kelleners	Lola B2K/10	D	0
DNS	SR1	15	(Germany) Konrad Motorsport	(Austria) Franz Konrad (Germany) Ralf Kelleners	Ford 6.0 L V8	D	0

== Statistics ==
- Pole Position - #17 Team Ascari - 1:45.100
- Fastest Lap - #17 Team Ascari - 1:32.396

FIA Sportscar Championship
Previous race: 2001 FIA Sportscar Championship Mondello	2001 season	Next race: None
