= 2001 FIA Sportscar Championship Spa =

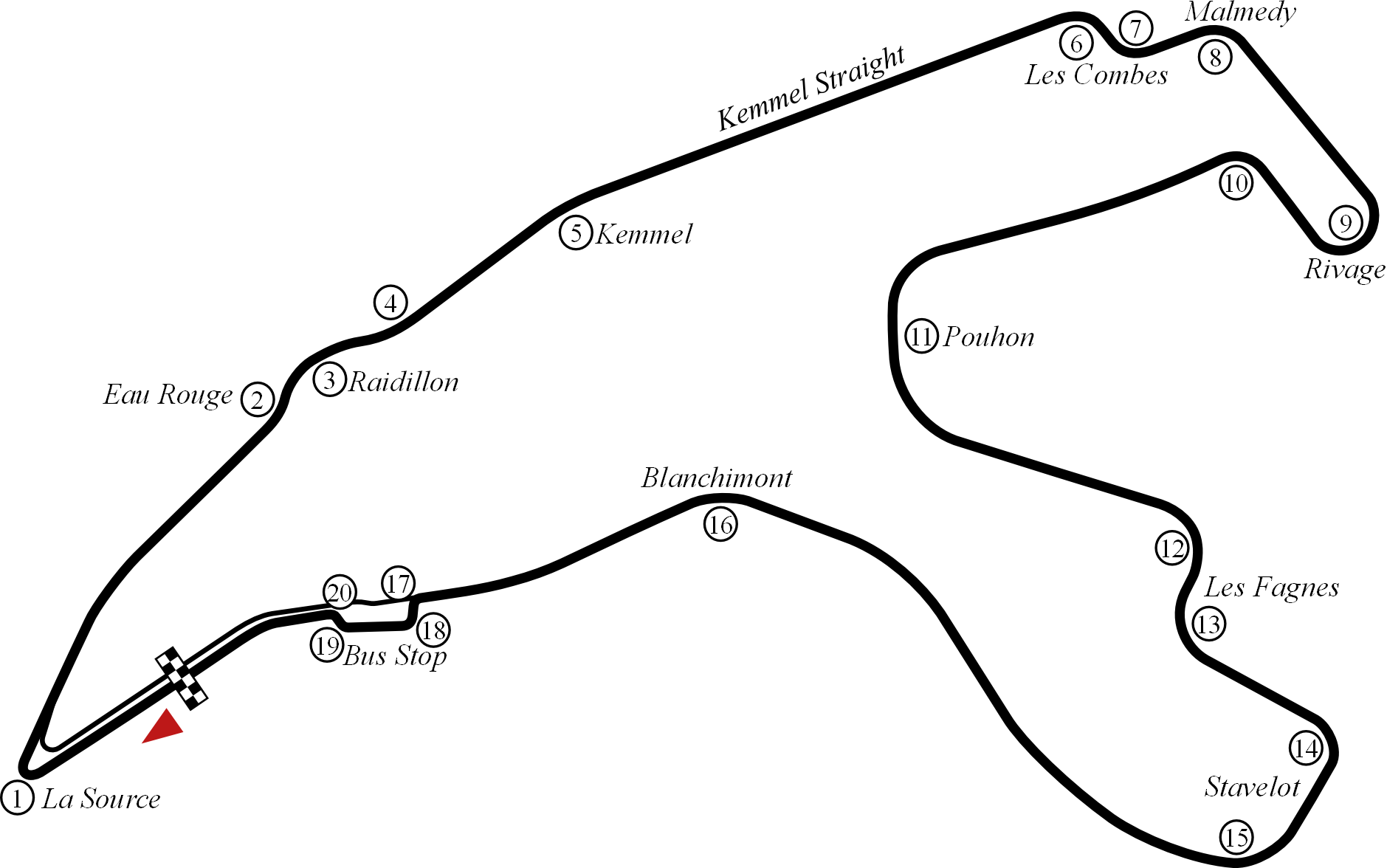
Layout of the Circuit de Spa-Francorchamps (1995–2003)

The 2001 FIA Sportscar Championship Spa was the third race of the 2001 FIA Sportscar Championship season held at Circuit de Spa-Francorchamps. It was a timed event that ran for two hours and thirty minutes. It took place on May 13, 2001.

== Official results ==
Class winners in bold. Cars failing to complete 75% of winner's distance marked as Not Classified (NC).

Pos	Class	No	Team	Drivers	Chassis	Tyre	Laps
Pos	Class	No	Team	Drivers	Engine	Tyre	Laps
1	**SR1**	**1**	**(Italy) BMS Scuderia Italia**	**(Italy) Marco Zadra** **(France) Jean-Marc Gounon**	**Ferrari 333 SP**	G	**64**
1	**SR1**	**1**	**(Italy) BMS Scuderia Italia**	**(Italy) Marco Zadra** **(France) Jean-Marc Gounon**	**Ferrari F310E 4.0 L V12**	G	**64**
2	SR1	2	(Italy) BMS Scuderia Italia	(Italy) Angelo Zadra (Switzerland) Enzo Calderari (Switzerland) Lilian Bryner	Ferrari 333 SP	G	64
2	SR1	2	(Italy) BMS Scuderia Italia	(Italy) Angelo Zadra (Switzerland) Enzo Calderari (Switzerland) Lilian Bryner	Ferrari F310E 4.0 L V12	G	64
3	SR1	8	(Netherlands) Racing for Holland	(Netherlands) Jan Lammers (Netherlands) Val Hillebrand	Dome S101	A	64
3	SR1	8	(Netherlands) Racing for Holland	(Netherlands) Jan Lammers (Netherlands) Val Hillebrand	Judd GV4 4.0L V10	A	64
4	SR1	17	(United Kingdom) Team Ascari	(United Kingdom) Ben Collins (South Africa) Werner Lupberger	Ascari A410	G	63
4	SR1	17	(United Kingdom) Team Ascari	(United Kingdom) Ben Collins (South Africa) Werner Lupberger	Judd GV4 4.0L V10	G	63
5	SR1	3	(Monaco) GLV Brums	(Italy) Giovanni Lavaggi (United Kingdom) Christian Vann	Ferrari 333 SP	G	62
5	SR1	3	(Monaco) GLV Brums	(Italy) Giovanni Lavaggi (United Kingdom) Christian Vann	Judd GV4 4.0L V10	G	62
6	**SR2**	**59**	**(Italy) BM Autosport**	**(Italy) Massimo Monti** **(Italy) Renato Nobili**	**Tampolli SR2 RTA-99**	P	**62**
6	**SR2**	**59**	**(Italy) BM Autosport**	**(Italy) Massimo Monti** **(Italy) Renato Nobili**	**Alfa Romeo 3.0 L V6**	P	**62**
7	SR2	52	(Italy) Lucchini Engineering	(Italy) Pierguiseppe Peroni (France) Jean-Bernard Bouvet	Lucchini SR2001	P	62
7	SR2	52	(Italy) Lucchini Engineering	(Italy) Pierguiseppe Peroni (France) Jean-Bernard Bouvet	Alfa Romeo 3.0 L V6	P	62
8	SR2	50	(Italy) Lucchini Engineering	(Italy) Raffaele Raimondi (Italy) Filippo Francioni	Lucchini SR2001	P	61
8	SR2	50	(Italy) Lucchini Engineering	(Italy) Raffaele Raimondi (Italy) Filippo Francioni	Alfa Romeo 3.0L V6	P	61
9	SR2	66	(Italy) Audisio & Benvenuto Racing	(Italy) Roberto Tonetti (Italy) Massimo Saccomanno	Lucchini SR2001	G	61
9	SR2	66	(Italy) Audisio & Benvenuto Racing	(Italy) Roberto Tonetti (Italy) Massimo Saccomanno	Alfa Romeo 3.0 L V6	G	61
10	SR1	5	(United Kingdom) Den Bla Avis/Team Goh	(Denmark) John Nielsen (Japan) Hiroki Katoh	Dome S101	G	61
10	SR1	5	(United Kingdom) Den Bla Avis/Team Goh	(Denmark) John Nielsen (Japan) Hiroki Katoh	Judd GV4 4.0L V10	G	61
11	SR2	76	SportsRacing Team Sweden	(Sweden) Thed Björk (United States) Larry Oberto (South Africa) Earl Goddard	Lola B2K/40	A	60
11	SR2	76	SportsRacing Team Sweden	(Sweden) Thed Björk (United States) Larry Oberto (South Africa) Earl Goddard	Nissan 3.0 L V6	A	60
12	SR2	55	(Austria) Renauer Motorsport	(Austria) Manfred Jurasz (Austria) Hannes Gsell (United Kingdom) Martin Henderson	Tampolli SR2 RTA-2001	A	58
12	SR2	55	(Austria) Renauer Motorsport	(Austria) Manfred Jurasz (Austria) Hannes Gsell (United Kingdom) Martin Henderson	Alfa Romeo 3.0 L V6	A	58
13	SR2	99	(France) PiR Competition	(France) Marc Rostan (France) Pierre Bruneau (Italy) Arturo Merzario	Debora LMP299	A	55
13	SR2	99	(France) PiR Competition	(France) Marc Rostan (France) Pierre Bruneau (Italy) Arturo Merzario	BMW 3.0 L I6	A	55
14	SR2	72	(Italy) SCI	(Italy) Ranieri Randaccio (Italy) Pasquale Barberio	Lucchini SR2000	G	47
14	SR2	72	(Italy) SCI	(Italy) Ranieri Randaccio (Italy) Pasquale Barberio	Alfa Romeo 3.0L V6	G	47
DNF	SR2	51	(Italy) Lucchini Engineering	(Italy) Denny Zardo (Italy) Mauro Prospero	Lucchini SR2000	P	32
DNF	SR2	51	(Italy) Lucchini Engineering	(Italy) Denny Zardo (Italy) Mauro Prospero	Alfa Romeo 3.0 L V6	P	32
DNF	SR1	7	(United Kingdom) Redman Bright	(United Kingdom) Mark Smithson (United Kingdom) Peter Owen	Reynard 01Q	A	30
DNF	SR1	7	(United Kingdom) Redman Bright	(United Kingdom) Mark Smithson (United Kingdom) Peter Owen	Judd GV4 4.0L V10	A	30
DNF	SR2	61	(United Kingdom) Rowan Racing	(United Kingdom) Warren Carway (United Kingdom) Martin O'Connell	Pilbeam MP84	A	23
DNF	SR2	61	(United Kingdom) Rowan Racing	(United Kingdom) Warren Carway (United Kingdom) Martin O'Connell	Nissan 3.0 L V6	A	23
DNF	SR1	10	(Germany) Kremer Racing	(United Kingdom) Sam Hancock (Belgium) Didier de Radiguès	Lola B98/10	G	5
DNF	SR1	10	(Germany) Kremer Racing	(United Kingdom) Sam Hancock (Belgium) Didier de Radiguès	Ford 6.0 L V8	G	5
DNF	SR2	69	(Kenya) Swara Racing	(United Kingdom) Simon Wiseman (United Kingdom) Michael Mallock	Pilbeam MP84	A	1
DNF	SR2	69	(Kenya) Swara Racing	(United Kingdom) Simon Wiseman (United Kingdom) Michael Mallock	Nissan (AER) VQL 3.0L V6	A	1
DSQ	SR1	6	(Italy) R&M	(Italy) Mauro Baldi (Italy) Alex Caffi	Riley & Scott Mk III	G	31
DSQ	SR1	6	(Italy) R&M	(Italy) Mauro Baldi (Italy) Alex Caffi	Judd GV4 4.0L V10	G	31
DNS	SR2	75	(United Kingdom) Team Sovereign	(United Kingdom) Ian Flux (United Kingdom) Mike Millard	Rapier 6	D	0
DNS	SR2	75	(United Kingdom) Team Sovereign	(United Kingdom) Ian Flux (United Kingdom) Mike Millard	Nissan (AER) VQL 3.0L V6	D	0

== Statistics ==
- Pole Position - #5 Den Bla Avis/Team Goh - 2:10.706
- Fastest Lap - #3 GLV Brums - 2:14.084

FIA Sportscar Championship
Previous race: 2001 FIA Sportscar Championship Monza	2001 season	Next race: 2001 FIA Sportscar Championship Brno
