= 2001 FIA Sportscar Championship =

Seasons
- ← 2000 2002 →

The 2001 FIA Sportscar Championship was the inaugural season of FIA Sportscar Championship, an auto racing series regulated by the Fédération Internationale de l'Automobile and organized by International Racing Series Ltd. The series was a continuation of the previous SportsRacing World Cup dating back to 1997. It was open to two categories of sports prototypes, SR1 and SR2, and awarded championships to drivers and teams in each category. A championship for constructors was also established for this season. It began on 8 April 2001 and ended on 16 September 2001 after eight races.

Italian Marco Zadra won the SR1 drivers' championship, while his BMS Scuderia Italia Ferrari secured the teams' and constructors' titles. The SR2 class was led by American Larry Oberto and Swede Thed Björk who drove for SportsRacing Team Sweden. Lola won the constructors' championship in SR2.

== Schedule ==
Despite still sharing regulations with the American Grand Am Road Racing Series, the American series no longer counted toward the new FIA championship. Kyalami also did not return, leaving the calendar strictly European. Catalunya, Monza, Spa, Brno, Donington, Magny-Cours, and the Nürburgring were all carried over from the previous season, joined by the Irish Mondello Park. Monza replaced its former World Cup race with the traditional 1000 km race, adding an endurance event to the calendar. All other races were timed events with a set duration of 2 hours and 30 minutes.

Rnd	Race	Circuit	Date
1	FIA Sportscar Championship Barcelona	Circuit de Catalunya, Montmeló, Spain	8 April
2	1000 km di Monza	Autodromo Nazionale di Monza, Monza, Italy	22 April
3	R.M.U. Classic	Circuit de Spa-Francorchamps, Stavelot, Belgium	13 May
4	Mistrovství FIA Sportovních Vozů	Autodrom Brno, Brno, Czech Republic	1 July
5	FIA Sportscar Championship Magny-Cours	Circuit de Nevers Magny-Cours, Magny-Cours, France	29 July
6	August Bank Holiday Grand Prix	Donington Park, North West Leicestershire, United Kingdom	26 August
7	FIA Sportscar Championship Mondello	(Republic of Ireland) Mondello Park, Caragh, Ireland	1 September
8	DMC/ADAC Sportwagen-Festival Nürburgring	Nürburgring, Nürburg, Germany	16 September

== Entries ==
=== SR1 ===
Entrant	Car	Engine	Tyre	No.	Drivers	Rounds
(Italy) BMS Scuderia Italia	Ferrari 333 SP	Ferrari F130E 4.0 L V12	G	1	(Italy) Marco Zadra	All
(Italy) BMS Scuderia Italia	Ferrari 333 SP	Ferrari F130E 4.0 L V12	G	1	(Italy) Christian Pescatori	1–2, 5, 7–8
(Italy) BMS Scuderia Italia	Ferrari 333 SP	Ferrari F130E 4.0 L V12	G	1	(France) Jean-Marc Gounon	3–4, 6
(Italy) BMS Scuderia Italia	Ferrari 333 SP	Ferrari F130E 4.0 L V12	G	2	(Italy) Angelo Zadra	All
(Italy) BMS Scuderia Italia	Ferrari 333 SP	Ferrari F130E 4.0 L V12	G	2	(Switzerland) Enzo Calderari	All
(Italy) BMS Scuderia Italia	Ferrari 333 SP	Ferrari F130E 4.0 L V12	G	2	(Switzerland) Lilian Bryner	All
(Italy) BMS Scuderia Italia	Ferrari 333 SP	Ferrari F130E 4.0 L V12	G	2	(Italy) Marco Zadra	2
(Monaco) GLV Brums	Ferrari 333 SP	Ferrari F130E 4.0 L V12; Judd GV4 4.0 L V10	G	3	(Italy) Giovanni Lavaggi	1–6, 8
(Monaco) GLV Brums	Ferrari 333 SP	Ferrari F130E 4.0 L V12; Judd GV4 4.0 L V10	G	3	(United Kingdom) Christian Vann	1–6
(Monaco) GLV Brums	Ferrari 333 SP	Ferrari F130E 4.0 L V12; Judd GV4 4.0 L V10	G	3	(United Kingdom) Bob Berridge	8
(Monaco) GLV Brums	Ferrari 333 SP	Ferrari F130E 4.0 L V12; Judd GV4 4.0 L V10	G	3	(France) Xavier Pompidou	8
(United Kingdom) Den Bla Avis/Team Goh	Dome S101	Judd GV4 4.0 L V10	G	5	(Denmark) John Nielsen	All
(United Kingdom) Den Bla Avis/Team Goh	Dome S101	Judd GV4 4.0 L V10	G	5	(Japan) Hiroki Katoh	All
(Italy) R&M	Riley & Scott Mk III	Judd GV4 4.0 L V10	G	6	(Italy) Mauro Baldi	All
(Italy) R&M	Riley & Scott Mk III	Judd GV4 4.0 L V10	G	6	(South Africa) Gary Formato	1
(Italy) R&M	Riley & Scott Mk III	Judd GV4 4.0 L V10	G	6	(Italy) Ivan Capelli	2
(Italy) R&M	Riley & Scott Mk III	Judd GV4 4.0 L V10	G	6	(Italy) Alex Caffi	3–8
(United Kingdom) Redman Bright	Reynard 01Q	Judd GV4 4.0 L V10	A	7	(United Kingdom) Mark Smithson	1–3, 5–6, 8
(United Kingdom) Redman Bright	Reynard 01Q	Judd GV4 4.0 L V10	A	7	(United Kingdom) Peter Owen	1–3, 5–6, 8
(United Kingdom) Redman Bright	Reynard 01Q	Judd GV4 4.0 L V10	A	7	(United Kingdom) Guy Smith	2
(Netherlands) Racing for Holland	Dome S101	Judd GV4 4.0 L V10	A G	8	(Netherlands) Jan Lammers	All
(Netherlands) Racing for Holland	Dome S101	Judd GV4 4.0 L V10	A G	8	(Netherlands) Val Hillebrand	All
(Germany) Kremer Racing	Lola B98/10	Ford 6.0 L V8	G	10	(United Kingdom) Sam Hancock	All
(Germany) Kremer Racing	Lola B98/10	Ford 6.0 L V8	G	10	(Germany) Ralf Kelleners	1
(Germany) Kremer Racing	Lola B98/10	Ford 6.0 L V8	G	10	(Belgium) Didier de Radiguès	2–3
(Germany) Kremer Racing	Lola B98/10	Ford 6.0 L V8	G	10	(South Africa) Gary Formato	2, 4
(Germany) Kremer Racing	Lola B98/10	Ford 6.0 L V8	G	10	(France) Jean-Marc Gounon	5, 7–8
(Germany) Kremer Racing	Lola B98/10	Ford 6.0 L V8	G	10	(Canada) Robbie Stirling	6
(Germany) Konrad Motorsport	Lola B2K/10	Ford 6.0 L V8	D	15	(Austria) Franz Konrad	8
(Germany) Konrad Motorsport	Lola B2K/10	Ford 6.0 L V8	D	15	(Germany) Ralf Kelleners	8
(France) Pescarolo Sport	Courage C60	Peugeot A32 3.2 L Turbo V6	G	16	(France) Jean-Christophe Boullion	1–2, 5, 8
(France) Pescarolo Sport	Courage C60	Peugeot A32 3.2 L Turbo V6	G	16	(France) Sébastien Bourdais	1–2
(France) Pescarolo Sport	Courage C60	Peugeot A32 3.2 L Turbo V6	G	16	(France) Laurent Redon	2, 5
(France) Pescarolo Sport	Courage C60	Peugeot A32 3.2 L Turbo V6	G	16	(France) Boris Derichebourg	8
(United Kingdom) Team Ascari	Ascari A410	Judd GV4 4.0 L V10	G	17	(United Kingdom) Ben Collins	All
(United Kingdom) Team Ascari	Ascari A410	Judd GV4 4.0 L V10	G	17	(South Africa) Werner Lupberger	All
(Italy) Team Durango	GMS Durango LMP1	BMW 4.0 L V8	G	21	(Italy) Andrea de Lorenzi	5
(Italy) Team Durango	GMS Durango LMP1	BMW 4.0 L V8	G	21	(France) Soheil Ayari	5
(Italy) Conrero	Riley & Scott Mk III	Ford 4.0 L V8	G	25	(Italy) Alex Caffi	2
(Italy) Conrero	Riley & Scott Mk III	Ford 4.0 L V8	G	25	(Italy) Angelo Lancelotti	2
(Italy) Conrero	Riley & Scott Mk III	Ford 4.0 L V8	G	25	(Switzerland) Andrea Chiesa	2

=== SR2 ===
Entrant	Car	Engine	Tyre	No.	Drivers	Rounds
(Italy) Lucchini Engineering	Lucchini SR2001	Alfa Romeo 3.0 L V6	P	50	(Italy) Raffaele Raimondi	1–4
(Italy) Lucchini Engineering	Lucchini SR2001	Alfa Romeo 3.0 L V6	P	50	(Italy) Filippo Francioni	1–4
(Italy) Lucchini Engineering	Lucchini SR2001	Alfa Romeo 3.0 L V6	P	50	(Italy) Pierguiseppe Peroni	1–2
(Italy) Lucchini Engineering	Lucchini SR2000	Alfa Romeo 3.0 L V6	P	51	(Italy) Denny Zardo	1–7
(Italy) Lucchini Engineering	Lucchini SR2000	Alfa Romeo 3.0 L V6	P	51	(Italy) Mauro Prospero	1–7
(Italy) Lucchini Engineering	Lucchini SR2001	Alfa Romeo 3.0 L V6	P	52	(Italy) Pierguiseppe Peroni	3–8
(Italy) Lucchini Engineering	Lucchini SR2001	Alfa Romeo 3.0 L V6	P	52	(France) Jean-Bernard Bouvet	3–5
(Italy) Lucchini Engineering	Lucchini SR2001	Alfa Romeo 3.0 L V6	P	52	(Belgium) Sébastien Ugeux	6–7
(Italy) Lucchini Engineering	Lucchini SR2001	Alfa Romeo 3.0 L V6	P	52	(Italy) Raffaele Raimondi	8
(Italy) Siliprandi	Lucchini SR2-99	Alfa Romeo 3.0 L V6	A	53	(Italy) Pasquale Barberio	2, 8
(Italy) Siliprandi	Lucchini SR2-99	Alfa Romeo 3.0 L V6	A	53	(Italy) Ezio Mazza	2, 8
(Austria) Renauer Motorsport	Tampolli SR2 RTA-2001	Alfa Romeo 3.0 L V6	A	55	(Austria) Manfred Jurasz	1, 3
(Austria) Renauer Motorsport	Tampolli SR2 RTA-2001	Alfa Romeo 3.0 L V6	A	55	(Austria) Gottfried Cepin	1, 4, 8
(Austria) Renauer Motorsport	Tampolli SR2 RTA-2001	Alfa Romeo 3.0 L V6	A	55	(Austria) Hannes Gsell	3–5, 8
(Austria) Renauer Motorsport	Tampolli SR2 RTA-2001	Alfa Romeo 3.0 L V6	A	55	(United Kingdom) Martin Henderson	3, 8
(Austria) Renauer Motorsport	Tampolli SR2 RTA-2001	Alfa Romeo 3.0 L V6	A	55	(Austria) Wolfgang Griessner	4
(Austria) Renauer Motorsport	Tampolli SR2 RTA-2001	Alfa Romeo 3.0 L V6	A	55	(Germany) Wolfgang Kaufmann	5
(Austria) Renauer Motorsport	Tampolli SR2 RTA-2001	Alfa Romeo 3.0 L V6	A	55	(Austria) Norbert Groer	5
(Belgium) EBRT Schroder Motorsport	Pilbeam MP84	Nissan (AER) VQL 3.0 L V6	D	58	(United Kingdom) Ian Khan	1–2
(Belgium) EBRT Schroder Motorsport	Pilbeam MP84	Nissan (AER) VQL 3.0 L V6	D	58	(United Kingdom) Martin Henderson	1–2
(Belgium) EBRT Schroder Motorsport	Pilbeam MP84	Nissan (AER) VQL 3.0 L V6	D	58	(United Kingdom) Mark Peters	1
(Belgium) EBRT Schroder Motorsport	Pilbeam MP84	Nissan (AER) VQL 3.0 L V6	D	58	(Belgium) Pierre Merche	2
(Italy) BM Autosport	Tampolli SR2 RTA-99	Alfa Romeo 3.0 L V6	P	59	(Italy) Massimo Monti	1–6
(Italy) BM Autosport	Tampolli SR2 RTA-99	Alfa Romeo 3.0 L V6	P	59	(Italy) Renato Nobili	1–6
(United Kingdom) Rowan Racing	Pilbeam MP84	Nissan (AER) VQL 3.0 L V6	A	61	(United Kingdom) Warren Carway	1, 3–8
(United Kingdom) Rowan Racing	Pilbeam MP84	Nissan (AER) VQL 3.0 L V6	A	61	(United Kingdom) Martin O'Connell	1, 3–8
(Italy) Audisio & Benvenuto Racing	Lucchini SR2-99	Alfa Romeo 3.0 L V6	A	65	(Italy) Giuseppe Chiminelli	2, 4, 8
(Italy) Audisio & Benvenuto Racing	Lucchini SR2-99	Alfa Romeo 3.0 L V6	A	65	(Italy) Bruno Corradi	2
(Italy) Audisio & Benvenuto Racing	Lucchini SR2-99	Alfa Romeo 3.0 L V6	A	65	(Italy) Antonio Vallebona	2
(Italy) Audisio & Benvenuto Racing	Lucchini SR2-99	Alfa Romeo 3.0 L V6	A	65	(Italy) Ernesto Saccomanno	4
(Italy) Audisio & Benvenuto Racing	Lucchini SR2-99	Alfa Romeo 3.0 L V6	A	65	(Italy) Ivano Giuliani	8
(Italy) Audisio & Benvenuto Racing	Lucchini SR2001	Alfa Romeo 3.0 L V6	G	66	(Italy) Roberto Tonetti	1–6, 8
(Italy) Audisio & Benvenuto Racing	Lucchini SR2001	Alfa Romeo 3.0 L V6	G	66	(Italy) Massimo Saccomanno	1–6, 8
(Kenya) Swara Racing	Tampolli SR2 RTA-2001	Nissan (AER) VQL 3.0 L V6	A	68	(United Kingdom) Michael Mallock	4–6, 8
(Kenya) Swara Racing	Tampolli SR2 RTA-2001	Nissan (AER) VQL 3.0 L V6	A	68	(United Kingdom) Simon Wiseman	4
(Kenya) Swara Racing	Tampolli SR2 RTA-2001	Nissan (AER) VQL 3.0 L V6	A	68	(United Kingdom) Phil Andrews	5–6, 8
(Kenya) Swara Racing	Pilbeam MP84	Nissan (AER) VQL 3.0 L V6	A	69	(United Kingdom) Simon Wiseman	1–3, 8
(Kenya) Swara Racing	Pilbeam MP84	Nissan (AER) VQL 3.0 L V6	A	69	(United Kingdom) Ben McLoughlin	1–2
(Kenya) Swara Racing	Pilbeam MP84	Nissan (AER) VQL 3.0 L V6	A	69	(Germany) Heinrich Langfermann	1
(Kenya) Swara Racing	Pilbeam MP84	Nissan (AER) VQL 3.0 L V6	A	69	(United Kingdom) Michael Mallock	2–3
(Kenya) Swara Racing	Pilbeam MP84	Nissan (AER) VQL 3.0 L V6	A	69	(United Kingdom) "Frederico Careca"	8
(Italy) SCI	Lucchini SR2000	Alfa Romeo 3.0 L V6	G	72	(Italy) Ranieri Randaccio	All
(Italy) SCI	Lucchini SR2000	Alfa Romeo 3.0 L V6	G	72	(Italy) Pasquale Barberio	1
(Italy) SCI	Lucchini SR2000	Alfa Romeo 3.0 L V6	G	72	(Italy) Leonardo Maddalena	2–8
(United Kingdom) Team Sovereign	Rapier 6	Nissan (AER) VQL 3.0 L V6	D	75	(United Kingdom) Ian Flux	1, 3, 5–6, 8
(United Kingdom) Team Sovereign	Rapier 6	Nissan (AER) VQL 3.0 L V6	D	75	(United Kingdom) Mike Millard	1, 3, 5–6, 8
SportsRacing Team Sweden	Lola B2K/40	Nissan (AER) VQL 3.0 L V6	A	76	(Sweden) Thed Björk	All
SportsRacing Team Sweden	Lola B2K/40	Nissan (AER) VQL 3.0 L V6	A	76	(United States) Larry Oberto	All
SportsRacing Team Sweden	Lola B2K/40	Nissan (AER) VQL 3.0 L V6	A	76	(Sweden) Stanley Dickens	2
SportsRacing Team Sweden	Lola B2K/40	Nissan (AER) VQL 3.0 L V6	A	76	(South Africa) Earl Goddard	3
SportsRacing Team Sweden	Lola B2K/40	Nissan (AER) VQL 3.0 L V6	A	76	(Republic of Ireland) Damien Faulkner	7
(United Kingdom) Redman Bright	Pilbeam MP84	Nissan (AER) VQL 3.0 L V6	A	77	(United Kingdom) Piers Johnson	6
(United Kingdom) Redman Bright	Pilbeam MP84	Nissan (AER) VQL 3.0 L V6	A	77	(United Kingdom) Oli Wilkinson	6
(France) PiR Competition	Debora LMP299	BMW 3.0 L I6	A	99	(France) Marc Rostan	All
(France) PiR Competition	Debora LMP299	BMW 3.0 L I6	A	99	(France) Pierre Bruneau	1–6, 8
(France) PiR Competition	Debora LMP299	BMW 3.0 L I6	A	99	(Italy) Arturo Merzario	1–4
(France) PiR Competition	Debora LMP299	BMW 3.0 L I6	A	99	(Italy) Ludovico Manfredi	5–6
(France) PiR Competition	Debora LMP299	BMW 3.0 L I6	A	99	(United Kingdom) Arnie Black	7

== Results and standings ==
=== Race results ===
Rnd	Circuit	SR1 Winning Team	SR2 Winning Team	Reports
Rnd	Circuit	SR1 Winning Drivers	SR2 Winning Drivers	Reports
1	Barcelona	(Italy) No. 1 BMS Scuderia Italia	(United Kingdom) No. 61 Rowan Racing	Report
1	Barcelona	(Italy) Christian Pescatori (Italy) Marco Zadra	(United Kingdom) Warren Carway (United Kingdom) Martin O'Connell	Report
2	Monza	(Monaco) No. 3 GLV Brums	No. 76 SportsRacing Team Sweden	Report
2	Monza	(United Kingdom) Christian Vann (Italy) Giovanni Lavaggi	(United States) Larry Oberto (Sweden) Thed Björk	Report
3	Spa	(Italy) No. 1 BMS Scuderia Italia	(Italy) No. 59 BM Autosport	Report
3	Spa	(France) Jean-Marc Gounon (Italy) Marco Zadra	(Italy) Massimo Monti (Italy) Renato Nobili	Report
4	Brno	(United Kingdom) No. 5 Den Bla Avis/Team Goh	No. 76 SportsRacing Team Sweden	Report
4	Brno	(Denmark) John Nielsen (Japan) Hiroki Katoh	(United States) Larry Oberto (Sweden) Thed Björk	Report
5	Magny-Cours	(France) No. 16 Pescarolo Sport	(United Kingdom) No. 61 Rowan Racing	Report
5	Magny-Cours	(France) Jean-Christophe Boullion (France) Laurent Rédon	(United Kingdom) Warren Carway (United Kingdom) Martin O'Connell	Report
6	Donington	(United Kingdom) No. 17 Team Ascari	(United Kingdom) No. 61 Rowan Racing	Report
6	Donington	(United Kingdom) Ben Collins (South Africa) Werner Lupberger	(United Kingdom) Warren Carway (United Kingdom) Martin O'Connell	Report
7	Mondello	(United Kingdom) No. 5 Den Bla Avis/Team Goh	No. 76 SportsRacing Team Sweden	Report
7	Mondello	(Denmark) John Nielsen (Japan) Hiroki Katoh	(Republic of Ireland) Damien Faulkner (United States) Larry Oberto (Sweden) Thed Björk	Report
8	Nürburgring	(Netherlands) No. 8 Racing for Holland	No. 76 SportsRacing Team Sweden	Report
8	Nürburgring	(Netherlands) Jan Lammers (Netherlands) Val Hillebrand	(United States) Larry Oberto (Sweden) Thed Björk	Report

Points were awarded to the top eight finishers in each category. Entries were required to complete 60% of the race distance in order to be classified as a finisher and earn points. Drivers were required to complete 20% of the total race distance for their car to earn points. Teams scored points for only their highest finishing entry.

Points system
Event	1st	2nd	3rd	4th	5th	6th	7th	8th	9th	10th
Races	20	15	12	10	8	6	4	3	2	1

=== Drivers championships ===
==== SR1 ====
Marco Zadra won the SR1 Drivers title at the wheel of a Ferrari 333 SP entered by BMS Scuderia Italia.

Pos.	Driver	Team	BAR (Spain)	MON (Italy)	SPA (Belgium)	BRN (Czech Republic)	MAG (France)	DON (United Kingdom)	MON (Republic of Ireland)	NUR (Germany)	Total points
1	(Italy) Marco Zadra	(Italy) BMS Scuderia Italia	1	Ret	1	2	2	2	2	4	110
2	(Denmark) John Nielsen	(United Kingdom) Den Bla Avis/Team Goh	4	Ret	6	1	3	5	1	3	88
2	(Japan) Hiroki Katoh	(United Kingdom) Den Bla Avis/Team Goh	4	Ret	6	1	3	5	1	3	88
4	(Netherlands) Jan Lammers	(Netherlands) Racing for Holland	Ret	3	3	5	6	3	3	1	82
4	(Netherlands) Val Hillebrand	(Netherlands) Racing for Holland	Ret	3	3	5	6	3	3	1	82
6	(United Kingdom) Ben Collins	(United Kingdom) Team Ascari	Ret	2	4	4	4	1	6	DSQ	71
6	(South Africa) Werner Lupberger	(United Kingdom) Team Ascari	Ret	2	4	4	4	1	6	DSQ	71
8	(Italy) Christian Pescatori	(Italy) BMS Scuderia Italia	1	Ret			2		2	4	60
9	(Switzerland) Lilian Bryner	(Italy) BMS Scuderia Italia	2	Ret	2	7	5	Ret	5	Ret	50
9	(Switzerland) Enzo Calderari	(Italy) BMS Scuderia Italia	2	Ret	2	7	5	Ret	5	Ret	50
9	(Italy) Angelo Zadra	(Italy) BMS Scuderia Italia	2	Ret	2	7	5	Ret	5	Ret	50
9	(France) Jean-Marc Gounon	(Italy) BMS Scuderia Italia			1	2		2			50
9	(France) Jean-Marc Gounon	(Germany) Kremer Racing					Ret		Ret	Ret	50
13	(Italy) Mauro Baldi	(Italy) R&M	3	Ret	Ret	3	8	7	4	Ret	41
14	(France) Jean-Christophe Boullion	(France) Pescarolo Sport	Ret	Ret			1			2	35
15	(Italy) Alex Caffi	(Italy) Conrero		DNS							29
15	(Italy) Alex Caffi	(Italy) R&M			Ret	3	8	7	4	Ret	29
16	(Italy) Giovanni Lavaggi	(Monaco) GLV Brums	Ret	1	5	Ret	Ret	Ret		Ret	28
16	(United Kingdom) Christian Vann	(Monaco) GLV Brums	Ret	1	5	Ret	Ret	Ret			28
18	(France) Laurent Redon	(France) Pescarolo Sport		Ret			1				20
19	(United Kingdom) Peter Owen	(United Kingdom) Redman Bright	Ret	4	Ret		7	6		Ret	20
19	(United Kingdom) Mark Smithson	(United Kingdom) Redman Bright	Ret	4	Ret		7	6		Ret	20
21	(South Africa) Gary Formato	(Italy) R&M	3								18
21	(South Africa) Gary Formato	(Germany) Kremer Racing		Ret		6					18
22	(United Kingdom) Sam Hancock	(Germany) Kremer Racing	Ret	Ret	Ret	6	Ret	4	Ret	Ret	16
23	(France) Boris Derichebourg	(France) Pescarolo Sport								2	15
24	(United Kingdom) Guy Smith	(United Kingdom) Redman Bright		4							10
24	(Canada) Robbie Stirling	(Germany) Kremer Racing						4			10

Colour	Result
Gold	Winner
Silver	Second place
Bronze	Third place
Green	Points classification
Blue	Non-points classification
Blue	Non-classified finish (NC)
Purple	Retired, not classified (Ret)
Red	Did not qualify (DNQ)
Red	Did not pre-qualify (DNPQ)
Black	Disqualified (DSQ)
White	Did not start (DNS)
White	Withdrew (WD)
White	Race cancelled (C)
Blank	Did not practice (DNP)
Blank	Did not arrive (DNA)
Blank	Excluded (EX)

==== SR2 ====
The SR2 Drivers award went to Thed Björk and Larry Oberto who shared a Lola B2K/40-Nissan entered by SportsRacing Team Sweden.

Pos.	Driver	Team	BAR (Spain)	MON (Italy)	SPA (Belgium)	BRN (Czech Republic)	MAG (France)	DON (United Kingdom)	MON (Republic of Ireland)	NUR (Germany)	Total points
1	(Sweden) Thed Björk	SportsRacing Team Sweden	2	1	5	1	DSQ	2	1	1	118
1	(United States) Larry Oberto	SportsRacing Team Sweden	2	1	5	1	DSQ	2	1	1	118
3	(Republic of Ireland) Warren Carway	(United Kingdom) Rowan Racing	1		Ret	5	1	1	2	Ret	83
3	(United Kingdom) Martin O'Connell	(United Kingdom) Rowan Racing	1		Ret	5	1	1	2	Ret	83
5	(Italy) Pierguiseppe Peroni	(Italy) Lucchini Engineering	8	Ret	2	2	Ret	Ret	3	3	57
6	(Italy) Massimo Saccomanno	(Italy) Audisio & Benvenuto Racing	3	NC	4	3	Ret	5		2	57
6	(Italy) Roberto Tonetti	(Italy) Audisio & Benvenuto Racing	3	NC	4	3	Ret	5		2	57
8	(Italy) Massimo Monti	(Italy) BM Autosport	4	Ret	1	Ret	3	Ret			42
8	(Italy) Renato Nobili	(Italy) BM Autosport	4	Ret	1	Ret	3	Ret			42
10	(France) Marc Rostan	(France) PiR Competition	7	Ret	7	7	Ret	4	4	6	38
11	(Italy) Ranieri Randaccio	(Italy) SCI	9	Ret	8	4	Ret	6	Ret	4	31
12	(Italy) Mauro Prospero	(Italy) Lucchini Engineering	DNS	2	Ret	Ret	2	Ret	Ret		30
12	(Italy) Denny Zardo	(Italy) Lucchini Engineering	DNS	2	Ret	Ret	2	Ret	Ret		30
12	(France) Jean-Bernard Bouvet	(Italy) Lucchini Engineering			2	2	Ret				30
15	(Italy) Leonardo Maddalena	(Italy) SCI		Ret	8	4	Ret	6	Ret	4	29
16	(France) Pierre Bruneau	(France) PiR Competition	7	Ret	7	7	Ret	4		6	28
17	(Italy) Raffaele Raimondi	(Italy) Lucchini Engineering	8	Ret	3	DSQ				3	27
18	(United Kingdom) Ian Flux	(United Kingdom) Team Sovereign	5		DNS		Ret	3		7	24
18	(United Kingdom) Mike Millard	(United Kingdom) Team Sovereign	5		DNS		Ret	3		7	24
20	(United Kingdom) Martin Henderson	(Belgium) EBRT Schroeder Motorsport	DNS	4							24
20	(United Kingdom) Martin Henderson	(Austria) Renauer Motorsport			6					5	24
21	(Republic of Ireland) Damien Faulkner	SportsRacing Team Sweden							1		20
22	(Austria) Hannes Gsell	(Austria) Renauer Motorsport			6	6	Ret			5	20
23	(Italy) Filippo Francioni	(Italy) Lucchini Engineering	8	Ret	3	DSQ					15
24	(Italy) Pasquale Barberio	(Italy) SCI	9								14
24	(Italy) Pasquale Barberio	(Italy) Siliprandi		3						Ret	14
25	(Austria) Gottfried Cepin	(Austria) Renauer Motorsport	DNS			6				5	14
26	(Italy) Ezio Mazza	(Italy) Siliprandi		3						Ret	12
26	(Belgium) Sébastien Ugeux	(Italy) Lucchini Engineering						Ret	3		12
28	(Italy) Arturo Merzario	(France) PiR Competition	7	Ret	7	7					12
29	(United Kingdom) Ian Khan	(Belgium) EBRT Schroeder Motorsport	DNS	4							10
29	(Belgium) Pierre Merche	(Belgium) EBRT Schroeder Motorsport		4							10
29	(Italy) Ludovico Manfredi	(France) PiR Competition					Ret	4			10
29	(United Kingdom) Arnie Black	(France) PiR Competition							4		10
33	(United Kingdom) Simon Wiseman	(Kenya) Swara Racing	6	Ret	Ret	Ret				8	9
34	(South Africa) Earl Goddard	SportsRacing Team Sweden			5						8
35	(United Kingdom) Ben McLoughlin	(Kenya) Swara Racing	6	Ret							6
35	(Germany) Heinrich Langfermann	(Kenya) Swara Racing	6								6
35	(Austria) Wolfgang Griessner	(Austria) Renauer Motorsport				6					6
38	(United Kingdom) Piers Johnson	(United Kingdom) Redman Bright						7			4
38	(United Kingdom) Oli Wilkinson	(United Kingdom) Redman Bright						7			4
40	(United Kingdom) "Frederico Careca"	(Kenya) Swara Racing								8	3

=== Teams championships ===
==== SR1 ====
Pos.	Team	BAR (Spain)	MON (Italy)	SPA (Belgium)	BRN (Czech Republic)	MAG (France)	DON (United Kingdom)	MON (Republic of Ireland)	NUR (Germany)	Total points
1	(Italy) BMS Scuderia Italia	1	Ret	1	2	2	2	2	4	110
2	(United Kingdom) Den Bla Avis/Team Goh	4	Ret	6	1	3	5	1	3	88
3	(Netherlands) Racing for Holland	Ret	3	3	5	6	3	3	1	82
4	(United Kingdom) Team Ascari	Ret	2	4	4	4	1	6	DSQ	71
5	(Italy) R&M	3	Ret	Ret	3	8	7	4	Ret	41
6	(France) Pescarolo Sport	Ret	Ret			1			2	35
7	(Monaco) GLV Brums	Ret	1	5	Ret	Ret	Ret		Ret	28
8	(United Kingdom) Redman Bright	Ret	4	Ret		7	6		Ret	20
9	(Germany) Kremer Racing	Ret	Ret	Ret	6	Ret	4	Ret	Ret	16

==== SR2 ====
Pos.	Team	BAR (Spain)	MON (Italy)	SPA (Belgium)	BRN (Czech Republic)	MAG (France)	DON (United Kingdom)	MON (Republic of Ireland)	NUR (Germany)	Total points
1	SportsRacing Team Sweden	2	1	5	1	DSQ	2	1	1	118
2	(Italy) Lucchini Engineering	8	2	2	2	2	Ret	3	3	87
3	(United Kingdom) Rowan Racing	1		Ret	5	1	1	2	Ret	83
4	(Italy) Audisio & Benvenuto Racing	3	NC	4	3	Ret	5		2	57
5	(Italy) BM Autosport	4	Ret	1	Ret	3	Ret			42
6	(France) PiR Competition	7	Ret	7	7	Ret	4	4	6	38
7	(Italy) SCI	9	Ret	8	4	Ret	6	Ret	4	31
8	(United Kingdom) Team Sovereign	5		DNS		Ret	3		7	24
9	(Austria) Renauer Motorsport	DNS		6	6	Ret			5	20
10	(Italy) Siliprandi		3						Ret	12
11	(Belgium) EBRT Schroder Motorsport	DNS	4							10
12	(Kenya) Swara Racing	6	Ret	Ret	Ret	Ret	Ret		8	9
13	(United Kingdom) Redman Bright						7			4

=== Constructor championships ===
==== SR1 ====
Ferrari won the SR1 Constructors title.

Pos.	Constructor	BAR (Spain)	MON (Italy)	SPA (Belgium)	BRN (Czech Republic)	MAG (France)	DON (United Kingdom)	MON (Republic of Ireland)	NUR (Germany)	Total points
1	(Italy) Ferrari	1	1	1	2	2	2	2	4	130
2	(Japan) Dome	4	3	3	1	3	3	1	1	118
3	(United Kingdom) Ascari	Ret	2	4	4	4	1	6	DSQ	71
4	(United States) Riley & Scott	3	Ret	Ret	3	8	7	4	Ret	41
5	(France) Courage	Ret	Ret			1			2	35
6	(United Kingdom) Reynard	Ret	4	Ret		7	6		Ret	20
7	(United Kingdom) Lola	Ret	Ret	Ret	6	Ret	4	Ret	Ret	16

==== SR2 ====
The SR2 Constructors award went to Lola Cars International.

Pos.	Constructor	BAR (Spain)	MON (Italy)	SPA (Belgium)	BRN (Czech Republic)	MAG (France)	DON (United Kingdom)	MON (Republic of Ireland)	NUR (Germany)	Total points
1	(United Kingdom) Lola	2	1	5	1	DSQ	2	1	1	118
2	(Italy) Lucchini	3	2	2	2	2	5	3	2	107
3	(United Kingdom) Pilbeam	1	4	Ret	5	1	1	2	8	96
4	(Italy) Tampolli	4	Ret	1	6	3	Ret		5	56
5	(France) Debora	7	Ret	7	7	Ret	4	4	6	38
6	(United Kingdom) LM 3000 (Rapier)	5		DNS		Ret	3		7	24
