= 2001 FIA Sportscar Championship Mondello =

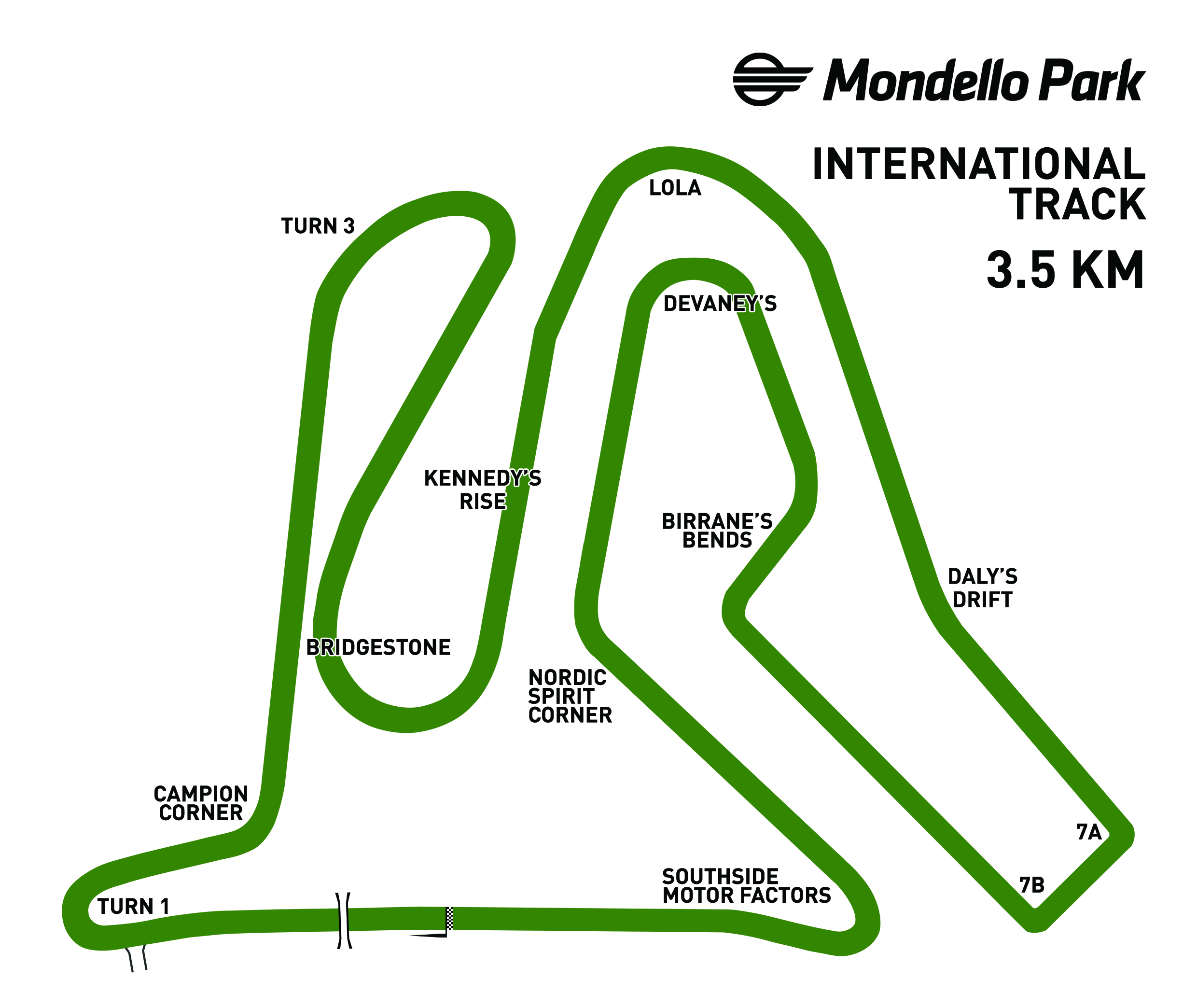
Layout of Mondello Park

The 2001 FIA Sportscar Championship Mondello was the seventh race for the 2001 FIA Sportscar Championship season held at Mondello Park and ran a distance of two hours and thirty minutes. It took place on September 1, 2001.

== Official results ==
Class winners in bold. Cars failing to complete 75% of winner's distance marked as Not Classified (NC).

| Pos | Class | No | Team | Drivers | Chassis | Tyre | Laps |
| Pos | Class | No | Team | Drivers | Engine | Tyre | Laps |
|---|---|---|---|---|---|---|---|
| 1 | **SR1** | **5** | **(United Kingdom) Den Bla Avis/Team Goh** | **(Denmark) John Nielsen** **(Japan) Hiroki Katoh** | **Dome S101** | G | **90** |
| 1 | **SR1** | **5** | **(United Kingdom) Den Bla Avis/Team Goh** | **(Denmark) John Nielsen** **(Japan) Hiroki Katoh** | **Judd GV4 4.0 L V10** | G | **90** |
| 2 | SR1 | 1 | (Italy) BMS Scuderia Italia | (Italy) Marco Zadra (Italy) Christian Pescatori | Ferrari 333 SP | G | 90 |
| 2 | SR1 | 1 | (Italy) BMS Scuderia Italia | (Italy) Marco Zadra (Italy) Christian Pescatori | Ferrari F130E 4.0 L V12 | G | 90 |
| 3 | **SR2** | **76** | **SportsRacing Team Sweden** | **(Sweden) Thed Björk** **(United States) Larry Oberto** **(Republic of Ireland) Damien Faulkner** | **Lola B2K/40** | A | **88** |
| 3 | **SR2** | **76** | **SportsRacing Team Sweden** | **(Sweden) Thed Björk** **(United States) Larry Oberto** **(Republic of Ireland) Damien Faulkner** | **Nissan (AER) VQL 3.0 L V6** | A | **88** |
| 4 | SR2 | 61 | (United Kingdom) Rowan Racing | (United Kingdom) Warren Carway (United Kingdom) Martin O'Connell | Pilbeam MP84 | A | 88 |
| 4 | SR2 | 61 | (United Kingdom) Rowan Racing | (United Kingdom) Warren Carway (United Kingdom) Martin O'Connell | Nissan (AER) VQL 3.0 L V6 | A | 88 |
| 5 | SR1 | 8 | (Netherlands) Racing for Holland | (Netherlands) Jan Lammers (Netherlands) Val Hillebrand | Dome S101 | G | 88 |
| 5 | SR1 | 8 | (Netherlands) Racing for Holland | (Netherlands) Jan Lammers (Netherlands) Val Hillebrand | Judd GV4 4.0 L V10 | G | 88 |
| 6 | SR2 | 52 | (Italy) Lucchini Engineering | (Italy) Pierguiseppe Peroni (Belgium) Sébastien Ugeux | Lucchini SR2001 | P | 86 |
| 6 | SR2 | 52 | (Italy) Lucchini Engineering | (Italy) Pierguiseppe Peroni (Belgium) Sébastien Ugeux | Alfa Romeo 3.0 L V6 | P | 86 |
| 7 | SR1 | 6 | (Italy) R&M | (Italy) Mauro Baldi (Italy) Alex Caffi | Riley & Scott Mk III | G | 85 |
| 7 | SR1 | 6 | (Italy) R&M | (Italy) Mauro Baldi (Italy) Alex Caffi | Judd GV4 4.0 L V10 | G | 85 |
| 8 | SR1 | 2 | (Italy) BMS Scuderia Italia | (Italy) Angelo Zadra (Switzerland) Enzo Calderari (Switzerland) Lilian Bryner | Ferrari 333 SP | G | 84 |
| 8 | SR1 | 2 | (Italy) BMS Scuderia Italia | (Italy) Angelo Zadra (Switzerland) Enzo Calderari (Switzerland) Lilian Bryner | Ferrari F130E 4.0 L V12 | G | 84 |
| 9 | SR1 | 17 | (United Kingdom) Team Ascari | (United Kingdom) Ben Collins (South Africa) Werner Lupberger | Ascari A410 | G | 81 |
| 9 | SR1 | 17 | (United Kingdom) Team Ascari | (United Kingdom) Ben Collins (South Africa) Werner Lupberger | Judd GV4 4.0 L V10 | G | 81 |
| 10 | SR2 | 99 | (France) PiR Competition | (France) Marc Rostan (United Kingdom) Arnie Black | Debora LMP299 | A | 73 |
| 10 | SR2 | 99 | (France) PiR Competition | (France) Marc Rostan (United Kingdom) Arnie Black | BMW 3.0 L I6 | A | 73 |
| DNF | SR1 | 10 | (Germany) Kremer Racing | (United Kingdom) Sam Hancock (France) Jean-Marc Gounon | Lola B98/10 | G | 64 |
| DNF | SR1 | 10 | (Germany) Kremer Racing | (United Kingdom) Sam Hancock (France) Jean-Marc Gounon | Ford 6.0 L V8 | G | 64 |
| DNF | SR2 | 72 | (Italy) SCI | (Italy) Ranieri Randaccio (Italy) Pasquale Barberio | Lucchini SR2000 | G | 53 |
| DNF | SR2 | 72 | (Italy) SCI | (Italy) Ranieri Randaccio (Italy) Pasquale Barberio | Alfa Romeo 3.0 L V6 | G | 53 |
| DNF | SR2 | 51 | (Italy) Lucchini Engineering | (Italy) Denny Zardo (Italy) Mauro Prospero | Lucchini SR2000 | P | 13 |
| DNF | SR2 | 51 | (Italy) Lucchini Engineering | (Italy) Denny Zardo (Italy) Mauro Prospero | Alfa Romeo 3.0 L V6 | P | 13 |

== Statistics ==
- Pole Position - #8 Racing For Holland - 1:30.931
- Fastest Lap - #1 BMS Scuderia Italia - 1:33.268

FIA Sportscar Championship
| Previous race: 2001 FIA Sportscar Championship Donington | 2001 season | Next race: 2001 FIA Sportscar Championship Nürburgring |
