= 2001 FIA Sportscar Championship Barcelona =

Layout of the Circuit de Catalunya (1995-2003)

The 2001 FIA Sportscar Championship Barcelona was the first race for the 2001 FIA Sportscar Championship season held at Circuit de Catalunya and ran a distance of two hours and thirty minutes. It took place on April 8, 2001.

== Official results ==
Class winners in bold. Cars failing to complete 75% of winner's distance marked as Not Classified (NC).

Pos	Class	No	Team	Drivers	Chassis	Tyre	Laps
Pos	Class	No	Team	Drivers	Engine	Tyre	Laps
1	**SR1**	**1**	**(Italy) BMS Scuderia Italia**	**(Italy) Marco Zadra** **(Italy) Christian Pescatori**	**Ferrari 333 SP**	G	**88**
1	**SR1**	**1**	**(Italy) BMS Scuderia Italia**	**(Italy) Marco Zadra** **(Italy) Christian Pescatori**	**Ferrari F310E 4.0 L V12**	G	**88**
2	SR1	2	(Italy) BMS Scuderia Italia	(Italy) Angelo Zadra (Switzerland) Enzo Calderari (Switzerland) Lilian Bryner	Ferrari 333 SP	G	88
2	SR1	2	(Italy) BMS Scuderia Italia	(Italy) Angelo Zadra (Switzerland) Enzo Calderari (Switzerland) Lilian Bryner	Ferrari F310E 4.0 L V12	G	88
3	SR1	6	(Italy) R&M	(Italy) Mauro Baldi (South Africa) Gary Formato	Riley & Scott Mk III	G	84
3	SR1	6	(Italy) R&M	(Italy) Mauro Baldi (South Africa) Gary Formato	Judd GV4 4.0L V10	G	84
4	**SR2**	**61**	**(United Kingdom) Rowan Racing**	**(United Kingdom) Warren Carway** **(United Kingdom) Martin O'Connell**	**Pilbeam MP84**	A	**82**
4	**SR2**	**61**	**(United Kingdom) Rowan Racing**	**(United Kingdom) Warren Carway** **(United Kingdom) Martin O'Connell**	**Nissan (AER) VQL 3.0L V6**	A	**82**
5	SR2	76	SportsRacing Team Sweden	(Sweden) Thed Björk (United States) Larry Oberto	Lola B2K/40	A	82
5	SR2	76	SportsRacing Team Sweden	(Sweden) Thed Björk (United States) Larry Oberto	Nissan (AER) VQL 3.0L V6	A	82
6	SR1	5	(United Kingdom) Den Bla Avis/Team Goh	(Denmark) John Nielsen (Japan) Hiroki Katoh	Dome S101	G	81
6	SR1	5	(United Kingdom) Den Bla Avis/Team Goh	(Denmark) John Nielsen (Japan) Hiroki Katoh	Judd GV4 4.0L V10	G	81
7	SR2	66	(Italy) Audisio & Benvenuto Racing	(Italy) Roberto Tonetti (Italy) Massimo Saccomanno	Lucchini SR2001	G	81
7	SR2	66	(Italy) Audisio & Benvenuto Racing	(Italy) Roberto Tonetti (Italy) Massimo Saccomanno	Alfa Romeo 3.0 L V6	G	81
8	SR2	59	(Italy) BM Autosport	(Italy) Massimo Monti (Italy) Renato Nobili	Tampolli SR2 RTA-99	P	80
8	SR2	59	(Italy) BM Autosport	(Italy) Massimo Monti (Italy) Renato Nobili	Alfa Romeo 3.0 L V6	P	80
9	SR2	75	(United Kingdom) Team Sovereign	(United Kingdom) Ian Flux (United Kingdom) Mike Millard	Rapier 6	D	78
9	SR2	75	(United Kingdom) Team Sovereign	(United Kingdom) Ian Flux (United Kingdom) Mike Millard	Nissan (AER) VQL 3.0L V6	D	78
10	SR2	69	(Kenya) Swara Racing	(United Kingdom) Simon Wiseman (United Kingdom) Ben McLoughlin (Germany) Heinrich Langfermann	Pilbeam MP84	A	77
10	SR2	69	(Kenya) Swara Racing	(United Kingdom) Simon Wiseman (United Kingdom) Ben McLoughlin (Germany) Heinrich Langfermann	Nissan (AER) VQL 3.0L V6	A	77
11	SR2	99	(France) PiR Competition	(France) Marc Rostan (France) Pierre Bruneau (Italy) Arturo Merzario	Debora LMP299	A	73
11	SR2	99	(France) PiR Competition	(France) Marc Rostan (France) Pierre Bruneau (Italy) Arturo Merzario	BMW 3.0 L I6	A	73
12	SR2	50	(Italy) Lucchini Engineering	(Italy) Raffaele Raimondi (Italy) Filippo Francioni (Italy) Pierguiseppe Peroni	Lucchini SR2001	P	70
12	SR2	50	(Italy) Lucchini Engineering	(Italy) Raffaele Raimondi (Italy) Filippo Francioni (Italy) Pierguiseppe Peroni	Alfa Romeo 3.0L V6	P	70
13	SR2	72	(Italy) SCI	(Italy) Ranieri Randaccio (Italy) Pasquale Barberio	Lucchini SR2000	G	62
13	SR2	72	(Italy) SCI	(Italy) Ranieri Randaccio (Italy) Pasquale Barberio	Alfa Romeo 3.0L V6	G	62
DNF	SR1	17	(United Kingdom) Team Ascari	(United Kingdom) Ben Collins (South Africa) Werner Lupberger	Ascari A410	G	74
DNF	SR1	17	(United Kingdom) Team Ascari	(United Kingdom) Ben Collins (South Africa) Werner Lupberger	Judd GV4 4.0L V10	G	74
DNF	SR1	16	(France) Pescarolo Sport	(France) Sébastien Bourdais (France) Jean-Christophe Boullion	Courage C60	G	57
DNF	SR1	16	(France) Pescarolo Sport	(France) Sébastien Bourdais (France) Jean-Christophe Boullion	Peugeot A32 3.2L Turbo V6	G	57
DNF	SR1	10	(Germany) Kremer Racing	(United Kingdom) Sam Hancock (Germany) Ralf Kelleners	Lola B98/10	G	25
DNF	SR1	10	(Germany) Kremer Racing	(United Kingdom) Sam Hancock (Germany) Ralf Kelleners	Ford 6.0 L V8	G	25
DNF	SR1	3	(Monaco) GLV Brums	(Italy) Giovanni Lavaggi (United Kingdom) Christian Vann	Ferrari 333 SP	G	1
DNF	SR1	3	(Monaco) GLV Brums	(Italy) Giovanni Lavaggi (United Kingdom) Christian Vann	Judd GV4 4.0L V10	G	1
DNF	SR1	8	(Netherlands) Racing for Holland	(Netherlands) Jan Lammers (Netherlands) Val Hillebrand	Dome S101	A	0
DNF	SR1	8	(Netherlands) Racing for Holland	(Netherlands) Jan Lammers (Netherlands) Val Hillebrand	Judd GV4 4.0L V10	A	0
DNF	SR1	7	(United Kingdom) Redman Bright	(United Kingdom) Mark Smithson (United Kingdom) Peter Owen	Reynard 01Q	A	0
DNF	SR1	7	(United Kingdom) Redman Bright	(United Kingdom) Mark Smithson (United Kingdom) Peter Owen	Judd GV4 4.0L V10	A	0
DNS	SR2	58	(Belgium) EBRT Schroder Motorsport	(United Kingdom) Ian Khan (United Kingdom) Martin Henderson (United Kingdom) Mark Peters	Pilbeam MP84	D	0
DNS	SR2	58	(Belgium) EBRT Schroder Motorsport	(United Kingdom) Ian Khan (United Kingdom) Martin Henderson (United Kingdom) Mark Peters	Nissan (AER) VQL 3.0L V6	D	0
DNS	SR2	51	(Italy) Lucchini Engineering	(Italy) Denny Zardo (Italy) Mauro Prospero	Lucchini SR2000	P	0
DNS	SR2	51	(Italy) Lucchini Engineering	(Italy) Denny Zardo (Italy) Mauro Prospero	Alfa Romeo 3.0 L V6	P	0
DNS	SR2	55	(Austria) Renauer Motorsport	(Austria) Manfred Jurasz (Austria) Gottfried Cepin	Tampolli SR2 RTA-2001	A	0
DNS	SR2	55	(Austria) Renauer Motorsport	(Austria) Manfred Jurasz (Austria) Gottfried Cepin	Alfa Romeo 3.0 L V6	A	0

== Statistics ==
- Pole Position - #1 BMS Scuderia Italia - 1:34.399
- Fastest Lap - #1 BMS Scuderia Italia - 1:36.799

FIA Sportscar Championship
Previous race: None	2001 season	Next race: 2001 FIA Sportscar Championship Monza
