= 2001 FIA Sportscar Championship Brno =

Layout of Brno Circuit

The 2001 FIA Sportscar Championship Brno was the fourth race of the 2001 FIA Sportscar Championship season held at Brno Circuit. It was a timed event that ran for two hours and thirty minutes. It took place on July 1, 2001.

== Official results ==
Class winners in bold. Cars failing to complete 75% of winner's distance marked as Not Classified (NC).

Pos	Class	No	Team	Drivers	Chassis	Tyre	Laps
Pos	Class	No	Team	Drivers	Engine	Tyre	Laps
1	**SR1**	**5**	**(United Kingdom) Den Bla Avis/Team Goh**	**(Denmark) John Nielsen** **(Japan) Hiroki Katoh**	**Dome S101**	G	**74**
1	**SR1**	**5**	**(United Kingdom) Den Bla Avis/Team Goh**	**(Denmark) John Nielsen** **(Japan) Hiroki Katoh**	**Judd GV4 4.0L V10**	G	**74**
2	SR1	1	(Italy) BMS Scuderia Italia	(Italy) Marco Zadra (France) Jean-Marc Gounon	Ferrari 333 SP	G	74
2	SR1	1	(Italy) BMS Scuderia Italia	(Italy) Marco Zadra (France) Jean-Marc Gounon	Ferrari F310E 4.0 L V12	G	74
3	SR1	6	(Italy) R&M	(Italy) Mauro Baldi (Italy) Alex Caffi	Riley & Scott Mk III	G	73
3	SR1	6	(Italy) R&M	(Italy) Mauro Baldi (Italy) Alex Caffi	Judd GV4 4.0L V10	G	73
4	SR1	17	(United Kingdom) Team Ascari	(United Kingdom) Ben Collins (South Africa) Werner Lupberger	Ascari A410	G	73
4	SR1	17	(United Kingdom) Team Ascari	(United Kingdom) Ben Collins (South Africa) Werner Lupberger	Judd GV4 4.0L V10	G	73
5	SR1	8	(Netherlands) Racing for Holland	(Netherlands) Jan Lammers (Netherlands) Val Hillebrand	Dome S101	A	73
5	SR1	8	(Netherlands) Racing for Holland	(Netherlands) Jan Lammers (Netherlands) Val Hillebrand	Judd GV4 4.0L V10	A	73
6	SR1	10	(Germany) Kremer Racing	(United Kingdom) Sam Hancock (South Africa) Gary Formato	Lola B98/10	G	73
6	SR1	10	(Germany) Kremer Racing	(United Kingdom) Sam Hancock (South Africa) Gary Formato	Ford 6.0 L V8	G	73
7	SR1	2	(Italy) BMS Scuderia Italia	(Italy) Angelo Zadra (Switzerland) Enzo Calderari (Switzerland) Lilian Bryner	Ferrari 333 SP	G	73
7	SR1	2	(Italy) BMS Scuderia Italia	(Italy) Angelo Zadra (Switzerland) Enzo Calderari (Switzerland) Lilian Bryner	Ferrari F310E 4.0 L V12	G	73
8	**SR2**	**76**	**SportsRacing Team Sweden**	**(Sweden) Thed Björk** **(United States) Larry Oberto**	**Lola B2K/40**	A	**71**
8	**SR2**	**76**	**SportsRacing Team Sweden**	**(Sweden) Thed Björk** **(United States) Larry Oberto**	**Nissan 3.0 L V6**	A	**71**
9	SR2	52	(Italy) Lucchini Engineering	(Italy) Pierguiseppe Peroni (France) Jean-Bernard Bouvet	Lucchini SR2001	P	71
9	SR2	52	(Italy) Lucchini Engineering	(Italy) Pierguiseppe Peroni (France) Jean-Bernard Bouvet	Alfa Romeo 3.0 L V6	P	71
10	SR2	66	(Italy) Audisio & Benvenuto Racing	(Italy) Roberto Tonetti (Italy) Massimo Saccomanno	Lucchini SR2001	G	70
10	SR2	66	(Italy) Audisio & Benvenuto Racing	(Italy) Roberto Tonetti (Italy) Massimo Saccomanno	Alfa Romeo 3.0 L V6	G	70
11	SR2	72	(Italy) SCI	(Italy) Ranieri Randaccio (Italy) Pasquale Barberio	Lucchini SR2000	G	69
11	SR2	72	(Italy) SCI	(Italy) Ranieri Randaccio (Italy) Pasquale Barberio	Alfa Romeo 3.0L V6	G	69
12	SR2	61	(United Kingdom) Rowan Racing	(United Kingdom) Warren Carway (United Kingdom) Martin O'Connell	Pilbeam MP84	A	69
12	SR2	61	(United Kingdom) Rowan Racing	(United Kingdom) Warren Carway (United Kingdom) Martin O'Connell	Nissan 3.0 L V6	A	69
13	SR2	55	(Austria) Renauer Motorsport	(Austria) Wolfgang Griessner (Austria) Gottfried Cepin (Austria) Hannes Gsell	Tampolli SR2 RTA-2001	A	66
13	SR2	55	(Austria) Renauer Motorsport	(Austria) Wolfgang Griessner (Austria) Gottfried Cepin (Austria) Hannes Gsell	Alfa Romeo 3.0 L V6	A	66
14	SR2	99	(France) PiR Competition	(France) Marc Rostan (France) Pierre Bruneau (Italy) Arturo Merzario	Debora LMP299	A	47
14	SR2	99	(France) PiR Competition	(France) Marc Rostan (France) Pierre Bruneau (Italy) Arturo Merzario	BMW 3.0 L I6	A	47
DNF	SR2	68	(Kenya) Swara Racing	(United Kingdom) Michael Mallock (United Kingdom) Simon Wiseman	Tampolli SR2 RTA-2001	A	33
DNF	SR2	68	(Kenya) Swara Racing	(United Kingdom) Michael Mallock (United Kingdom) Simon Wiseman	Nissan 3.0 L V6	A	33
DNF	SR2	65	(Italy) Audisio & Benvenuto Racing	(Italy) Giuseppe Chiminelli (Italy) Ernesto Saccomanno	Lucchini SR2-99	P	31
DNF	SR2	65	(Italy) Audisio & Benvenuto Racing	(Italy) Giuseppe Chiminelli (Italy) Ernesto Saccomanno	Alfa Romeo 3.0 L V6	P	31
DNF	SR2	59	(Italy) BM Autosport	(Italy) Massimo Monti (Italy) Renato Nobili	Tampolli SR2 RTA-99	P	20
DNF	SR2	59	(Italy) BM Autosport	(Italy) Massimo Monti (Italy) Renato Nobili	Alfa Romeo 3.0 L V6	P	20
DNF	SR1	3	(Monaco) GLV Brums	(Italy) Giovanni Lavaggi (United Kingdom) Christian Vann	Ferrari 333 SP	G	18
DNF	SR1	3	(Monaco) GLV Brums	(Italy) Giovanni Lavaggi (United Kingdom) Christian Vann	Judd GV4 4.0L V10	G	18
DNF	SR2	51	(Italy) Lucchini Engineering	(Italy) Denny Zardo (Italy) Mauro Prospero	Lucchini SR2000	P	5
DNF	SR2	51	(Italy) Lucchini Engineering	(Italy) Denny Zardo (Italy) Mauro Prospero	Alfa Romeo 3.0 L V6	P	5
DSQ	SR2	50	(Italy) Lucchini Engineering	(Italy) Raffaele Raimondi (Italy) Filippo Francioni	Lucchini SR2001	P	71
DSQ	SR2	50	(Italy) Lucchini Engineering	(Italy) Raffaele Raimondi (Italy) Filippo Francioni	Alfa Romeo 3.0L V6	P	71

== Statistics ==
- Pole Position - #1 BMS Scuderia Italia - 1:48.879
- Fastest Lap - #1 BMS Scuderia Italia - 1:52.271

FIA Sportscar Championship
Previous race: 2001 FIA Sportscar Championship Spa	2001 season	Next race: 2001 FIA Sportscar Championship Magny-Cours
