= 1997 British Formula 3000 Championship =

British Formula 3000 Championship

The 1997 British Formula 3000 Championship was the aborted eighth and final season of the British Formula 3000 Championship. Only one meeting on the Brands Hatch Indy circuit went ahead on April 13, where only three cars turned up. The rest of the season was cancelled due to low interest from teams who decided to focus on the International series.

The only race was won by Dino Morelli for DKS Racing from Redman Bright Engineering's Gonzalo Rodriguez and DKS teammate Tommy Field.

== Drivers and teams ==
The following drivers and teams contested what turned out to be the only meeting of the 1997 British Formula 3000 Championship. All teams ran a Lola T96/50 chassis with a Judd engine. This was the same spec chassis that was in use in the International series at the time.

| Team | No. | Driver |
|---|---|---|
| (United Kingdom) DKS Racing | 1 | (United Kingdom) Tommy Field |
| (United Kingdom) DKS Racing | 2 | (United Kingdom) Dino Morelli |
| (United Kingdom) Redman Bright Engineering | 6 | (Uruguay) Gonzalo Rodriguez |
