= Siliprandi =

Siliprandi (Latin: Siliprandus or de Siliprandis) was the surname of a Mantuan family of incunable printers. The founder of the printing business was Domenico (fl. 1435–1477). He was followed by his brother Alvise (fl. 1452–1499), who quit the printing business after 1480. Their father, Gaspare (c. 1405 – 1481), provided financing.

== Biographies ==
Gaspare, son of Antonio, was probably born in the first decade of the 15th century. He first appears in the historical record as an adult on 14 June 1442. He lived in Suzzara. With his father, he acquired he numerous lands in Luzzara, San Benedetto Po and Gonzaga. By 1452, his father had died, as had his father brother Pietro Giovanni (or Peterzano). Together with the latter's son, Antonio, Gaspare continued to increase the family's landholdings. In 1453, he relocated to Mantua and worked as a shoemaker.

Gaspare had two sons, Domenico (born before 1435) and Alvise (born before 1452). On 17 November 1460, Domenico was authorized as a notary in Mantua. In a letter of 13 April 1462 addressed to the Marquis Ludovico III Gonzaga, Domenico claimed to have worked as a notary in Forlì and Florence. On 4 December 1465, Gaspare wrote to the Marquise Barbara, Ludovico's wife, over a dispute with Bartolomeo Marasca. In the letter he claims to have four adult daughters. One, Lucia, was married by 1485 and widowed by 1492.

In 1469, Domenico was imprisoned for provoking disorders. After writing to the marquis, his sentence was lifted in 1470. In 1472, he entered the book trade and, in 1472, the printing business. His first printings were done in Venice. On 8 December 1472, he wrote to the marquis claiming persecution by the Manutan authorities, who had passed another sentence against him. In 1473, he set up a bookstore in Padua.

Gaspare remained at Mantua, but often contributed to the financing of the printing operations. In 1475, an agreement with Petrus Maufer to print Gentile da Foligno's Commentary on Avicenna fell through. In 1476 at Padua, Domenico formed a company with Petrus Maufer and Carlo Ridolfi. His partners, however, abandoned the printing midstream and Domenico had to get it finished by Paul Butzbach in Mantua. In 1477, he sued Maufer and Ridolfi but lost in court.

Alvise joined the printing business in 1477 and in 1479 was described as a bookseller in Mantua. By 14 June 1479, Domenico had died, leaving Alvise heir to his debts. Some of Domenico's goods were impounded, but Alvise had settled the debts by November. Alvise published his last books in 1480. Gaspare died between 29 March and 8 October 1481. Alvise is described in subsequent documents as a bookseller. In 1483, with Giovanni Francesco Stellini Tironi, he opened a bookshop on the Piazza Broletto in Padua. An inventory of their offerings survives from 1484. They had 887 copies representing about 130 different printed editions. He also bought up land. He was still living on 15 January 1499.

== Printings ==
The ex libris of Antonio Seripando in a copy of Siliprandi's Plutarch. The copy had previously belonged to Aulo Giano Parrasio.

Domenico's known printings include:

- Burchiello, Sonetti (Venice, 1472), a first edition by the German typographer Christoph Arnold
- Bartolo da Sassoferrato, Lectura super tribus libris Codicis (Mantua, 1476), by Paul Butzbach
- Petrarch, Rerum vulgarium fragmenta, with the commentary of Pseudo-Antonio da Tempo, and Triumphs, with the biography of Petrarch by Pier Candido Decembrio (Venice, 1477)
- Petrarch, Rerum vulgarium fragmenta, with the commentary of Pseudo-Antonio da Tempo and the biography of Petrarch attributed to Pseudo-Antonio (Venice, 1477), a revised edition of the preceding
- Plutarch, Greek Questions and Roman Questions, translated into Latin by Giovan Pietro d'Avenza, edited by Giovanni Calfurnio (Venice, 1477)

and possibly:

- al-Qabisi, Isagoge ad iudicia astrorum (Mantua, 1473?), by Johann Vurster

Alvise's known printings include:

- Missale Romanum (Venice, 1477)
- Psalterium Romanum (Venice, 1478)
- Nicholas of Lyra, Postilla super Actus apostolorum and Epistolas canonicales et Apocalypsim, with Paolo da Santa Maria, Additiones (Mantua, 1480)
- Pietro Marso, Silva cui titulus est Andes (Mantua, 1480)

== Works cited ==
- Becchi, Francesco (2019). "Humanist Latin Translations of the Moralia". In Sophia Xenophontos; Katerina Oikonomopoulou (eds.). Brill's Companion to the Reception of Plutarch. Brill. pp. 458–478.
- Canova, Andrea (2018). "Siliprandi, Gaspare, Domenico e Alvise". Dizionario Biografico degli Italiani, Volume 92: Semino–Sisto IV (in Italian). Rome: Istituto dell'Enciclopedia Italiana. ISBN 978-8-81200032-6.
- Monfasani, John (1988). "Calfurnio's Identification of Pseudepigrapha of Ognibene, Fenestella, and Trebizond, and His Attack on Renaissance Commentaries". Renaissance Quarterly. 41 (1): 32–43. doi:10.2307/2862243.
- Nuovo, Angela (2013). The Book Trade in the Italian Renaissance. Translated by Lydia G. Cochrane. Brill.
- Richardson, Brian (1994). Print Culture in Renaissance Italy: The Editor and the Vernacular Text, 1470–1600. Cambridge University Press.
