= Sébastien Ugeux =

Belgian race car driver

Sébastian Ugeux (born 29 September 1970) is a Belgian race car driver who raced two races of the 2001 FIA Sportscar Championship season for the Lucchini Engineering team. He later raced in the 2005 Le Mans Series season for Scuderia Villorba Corse, who also used a Lucchini chassis. Uguex won the 2005 Belgian Procar Championship, including a race win at Circuit de Spa-Francorchamps. His grandfather was Pierre Ugeux, former President of the Commission Sportive Internationale (CSI), which oversaw all Formula One sporting regulations.
