= Redman Bright =

(United Kingdom) Redman Bright Engineering
- Founded: 1997
- Founder(s): John Bright; Brian Redman
- Base: Leicestershire, United Kingdom
- Team principal(s): John Bright
- Former series: International Formula 3000; British Formula 3000 Championship; British Formula Renault; Italian Formula 3000 Championship; FIA Sportscar Championship
- Teams' Championships: 2000 Sports Racing World Cup (SRL)
- Drivers' Championships: 2000 Sports Racing World Cup (SRL): Peter Owen; Mark Smithson

Redman Bright Engineering was a British auto racing team founded in 1997 by racing driver turned engineer John Bright in partnership with former Formula One and sportscar driver Brian Redman. The team was initially set up to participate in two tiers of open wheel racing with Formula 3000 and Formula Renault efforts, including the International Formula 3000 series, before the team moved to sports car racing in association with Pilbeam Racing Designs, winning the 2000 Sports Racing World Cup for drivers and teams in their category. The team faded out after their 2001 campaign, eventually selling their equipment and being liquidated by the end of the year.

== Racing history ==
Following his retirement from motorsport, Brian Redman was convinced by John Bright, who had been Redman's race engineer in various programs in the 1980s in the United States, to become involved in a new Formula 3000 team. Redman was convinced to join the effort as a team boss on the stipulation that it cost him no money, although he would later fund the purchase of the team's first car. Bright was already experienced with Formula 3000, having been an engineer for Eddie Jordan Racing. Uruguayan Gonzalo Rodríguez sign with the team for the 1997 International Formula 3000 Championship, earning the best result of sixth at the Nürburgring. The team also participated in the British Formula 3000 Championship but it was canceled after only a single event. Redman Bright expanded for 1998 with a second car with the aid of pay drivers, replacing the departing Rodríguez with Mark Shaw for the full season and Jonny Kane and David Cook sharing the second entry for select events. None of their drivers were able to score points, with Kane registering the best finish of twelfth. The team also added British Formula Renault to their program, campaigning Venezuelan Juan José Font to fifth in the championship.

After being sued by the Cook family over their 1998 program, Redman Bright was financially unable to continue in the International series; only a single event in the Italian Formula 3000 Championship for Rafael Sarandeses was entered before the team abandoned their Formula 3000 efforts. In its place, the team looked to the Sports Racing World Cup, a sports prototype series that was also popular amongst several Formula 3000 teams. Chassis manufacturer Pilbeam Racing Designs, also based not far from the team's home in Leicestershire, had built cars that Bright had campaigned in British Formula 3 in the 1970s, and the two companies reached an agreement for Redman Bright to take over Pilbeam's own entry in the series. Drivers Peter Owen and Mark Smithson entered select races before attaining victory in their SR2 category at Kyalami in the season finale. The entry was doubled heading into the 2000 season, with Owen and Smithson sharing one car and campaigned in the early races by Werner Lupberger. Redman himself even briefly came out of retirement to share Owen and Smithson's car during the race at Daytona International Speedway. Aided by two victories for Owen and Smithson at Monza and Donington Park the team won the SR2 championship. Having succeeded in the lower SR2 category, Redman Bright moved to the top SR1 class in 2001 with the purchase of a Reynard-Judd. Owen and Smithson graduated to the new car as well, scoring a best finish of fourth at Monza after a late pit stop for emergency repairs while leading the race scuttled a potential victory. The pair eventually finished the season in 19th place in the standings. Despite these efforts, the team went into receivership before the end of the year and the partnership came to a quick end, with all of the team's cars being sold to other teams.

== Series results ==
International Formula 3000 Championship
Year	Car	Drivers	Races	Wins	Poles	Fast laps	Points	D.C.	T.C.
1997	Lola T96/50-Zytek	(Uruguay) Gonzalo Rodríguez	8	0	0		0.5	22nd	17th
1998	Lola T96/50-Zytek	(United Kingdom) Mark Shaw	12	0	0		0	NC	NC
1998	Lola T96/50-Zytek	(United Kingdom) Jonny Kane	4	0	0		0	NC	NC
1998	Lola T96/50-Zytek	(United Kingdom) David Cook	3	0	0		0	NC	NC

Sports Racing World Cup
Year	Class	Car	Drivers	Races	Wins	Poles	Fast laps	Points	T.C.
1999	SR2	Pilbeam MP84-Nissan	(United Kingdom) Peter Owen (United Kingdom) Mark Smithson	3	1	0		20	7th
2000	SRL	Pilbeam MP84-Nissan	(United Kingdom) Peter Owen (United Kingdom) Mark Smithson (United Kingdom) Brian Redman	10	2	0		133	1st
2000	SRL	Pilbeam MP84-Nissan	(South Africa) Werner Lupberger (United Kingdom) Owen Mildenhall (United States) Marc Bunting (United States) Chuck Goldsborough (Germany) Marc Lauer	5	0	0		133	1st
FIA Sportscar Championship
2001	SR1	Reynard 01Q-Judd	(United Kingdom) Peter Owen (United Kingdom) Mark Smithson (United Kingdom) Guy Smith	6	0	0		20	8th
2001	SR2	Pilbeam MP84-Nissan	(United Kingdom) Piers Johnson (United Kingdom) Oli Wilkinson	1	0	0		4	13th
