= Michael Mallock =

English racing driver

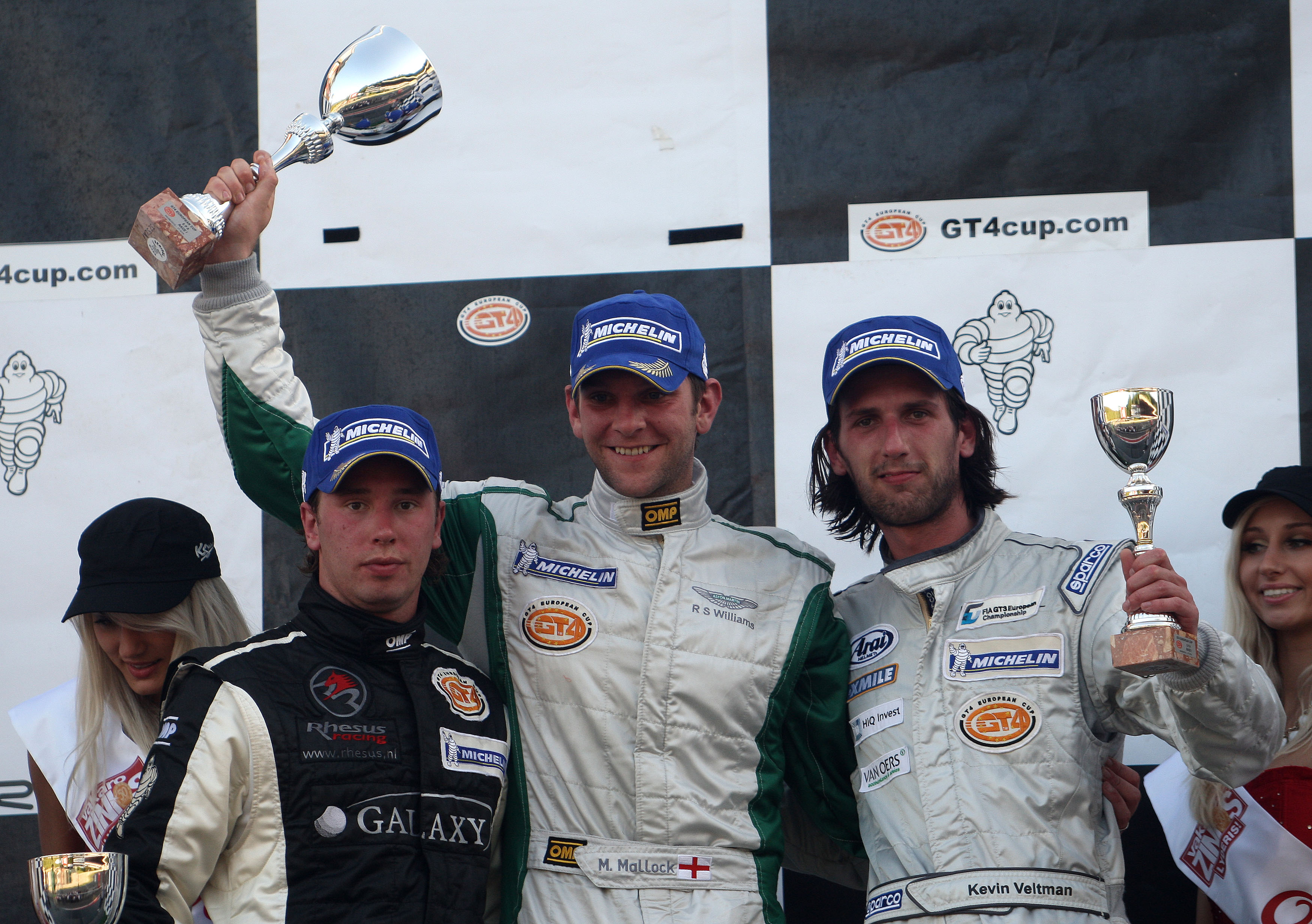
- Mallock (centre) with Paul Meijer (left) and Kevin Veltman.
- Nationality: (United Kingdom) British
- Born: Michael Raymond Mallock; October 26, 1982 (age 44) Northampton (England)
- Relatives: Ray Mallock (father)

GT4 European Cup career
- Current team: RSWilliams Ltd
- Categorisation: FIA Silver
- Car number: 32

Previous series
- SLR 722 GT Trophy; FIA GT; British GT

Michael Raymond Mallock (born 26 October 1982) is an English racing driver from Northampton. He is the son of Ray Mallock and grandson of Arthur Mallock, who were also professional racers. Michael later competed in the GT4 European Cup.

Michael stopped racing full-time in 2011 to take a role within the family business and is now Chief Executive at RML Group. He now occasionally races in historic cars including various historic Mallocks and at other one-off events.

== Racing record ==
=== Britcar 24 Hour results ===
Year	Team	Co-Drivers	Car	Car No.	Class	Laps	Pos.	Class Pos.
2007	(United Kingdom) RJN Motorsport	(United Kingdom) John Backer (United Kingdom) Jethro Bovingdon (United Kingdom) Richard Meaden	Nissan 350Z	57	1	506	15th	3rd
