= Ascari A410 =

Ascari A410 Ascari KZR-1
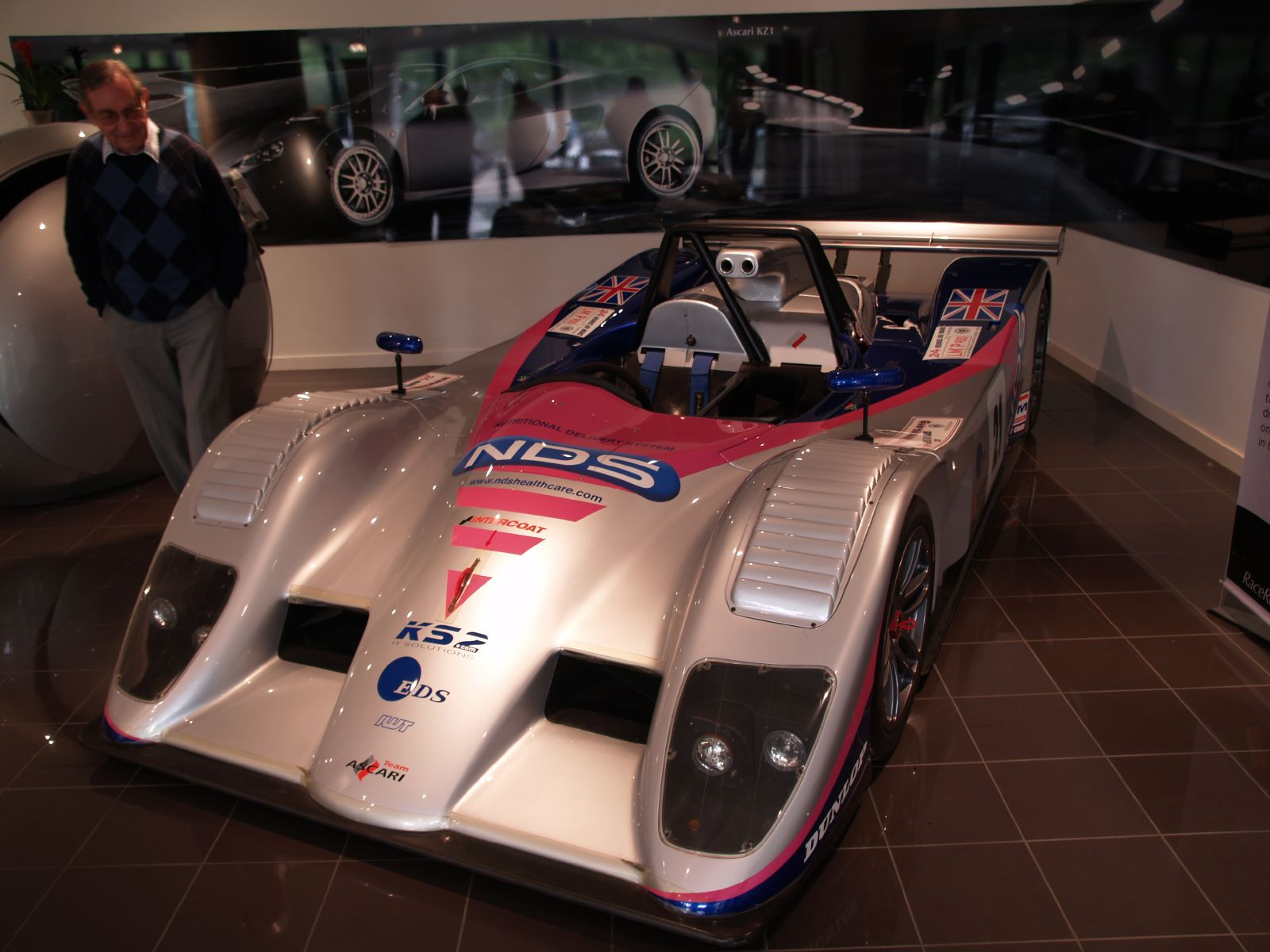
- Ascari KZR-1 at the Ascari Racing Resort
- Category: LMP900
- Constructor: Ascari Cars
- Designer: John McNeil
- Predecessor: Lola T92/10

Technical specifications
- Chassis: Carbon fibre monocoque
- Suspension (front): Double wishbone suspension, with push-rod actuated coil springs and dampers
- Suspension (rear): Double wishbone suspension, with push-rod actuated coil springs and dampers
- Engine: Judd GV4, 3,997 cc (243.9 cu in) V10 engine, naturally-aspirated mid-engined, longitudinally mounted
- Transmission: 6-speed sequential manual
- Weight: 900 kg (1,984.2 lb)
- Tyres: Pirelli; Goodyear; Dunlop

Competition history
- Notable entrants: Team Ascari
- Debut: A410: 2000 500 km of Silverstone; KZR-1: 2002 24 Hours of Daytona
Races	Wins
A410: 18 (15 starts); KZR-1: 7 (5 starts)	A410: 1 KZR-1: 0
- Teams' Championships: 0
- Constructors' Championships: 0
- Drivers' Championships: 0

The Ascari A410 was a Le Mans Prototype built by Ascari Cars in 2000. The car, which was based on the Lola T92/10 Group C racing car, featured a 4-litre Judd GV4 V10 engine, and was used in European and international sports car racing events. In 2002, it was renamed as the Ascari KZR-1.

Two cars and a spare chassis were built.

== Development ==
Following Klaas Zwart's founding of Ascari Cars in the late 1990s, he had begun to enter the team in sports car racing, initially using the Ascari Ecosse in 1999, before building the A410 in 2000. The A410 was a LMP900-class car and took its name from the 4-litre Judd GV4 V10 engine it was fitted with. The A410 was based on the Lola T92/10 Group C racing car and featured a similar chassis design, as well as similar suspension. Although clearly distinguishable from the T92/10 by its open bodywork – the T92/10 had a closed cockpit – the A410 used several styling cues from the T92/10, such as the flat-nosed front end. Even the 4-litre V10 was related to the T92/10; the Judd GV4 was a bigger version of the 3.5-litre GV10 unit featured in the early car, which itself started out life as a Formula One engine. Two cars were built and the car made its debut in 2000. In 2002, both cars were renamed as the KZR-1 – not to be confused with the Ascari KZ1-R GT3 racing car – and shipped to America.

== Specification ==
The A410 had a carbon fibre monocoque chassis, with double wishbone suspension, with push-rod actuated coil springs and dampers at both ends of the car. The naturally-aspirated Judd GV4 engine produced around 600 hp (447.4 kW; 608.3 PS) at 10,250 rpm, whilst it made 450 N⋅m (332 lb⋅ft) of torque at 8,500 rpm. Although the power output was similar to that of the most successful LMP900 car, the Audi R8, the naturally aspirated engine produced far less torque than the 3.6-litre, twin-turbocharged V8 engine in the R8; around 250 N⋅m (184 lb⋅ft) less. The A410 used a 6-speed sequential gearbox, driving the rear wheels, and featured carbon fibre disc brakes, as was standard within the class.

== Racing history ==
=== A410 (2000–2001) ===
The A410 made its debut in the 500 km of Silverstone in 2000, but gearbox problems prevented it from racing. Team Ascari then attempted to compete in the 24 Hours of Le Mans, but due to not having attended the Le Mans Test, were not invited to race. Zwart then entered himself alongside Werner Lupberger and Jeffrey van Hooydonk at the 1000 km of Nürburgring, but, although the car made the start of a race for the first time, they were forced to retire after 41 laps due to another gearbox failure. At the Brno round of the Sports Racing World Cup, an A410 finished a race for the first time; Lupberger and Zwart finished 19th, and last overall, twelve laps behind the next car. This was also the only time the A410 finished a race in 2000; the team retired at Donington Park without completing a lap due to electrical issues, before suffering similar problems at the Nürburgring after 27 laps, and a spin after 29 laps put the team out of the final race of the Sports Racing World Cup season, held at Magny-Cours.

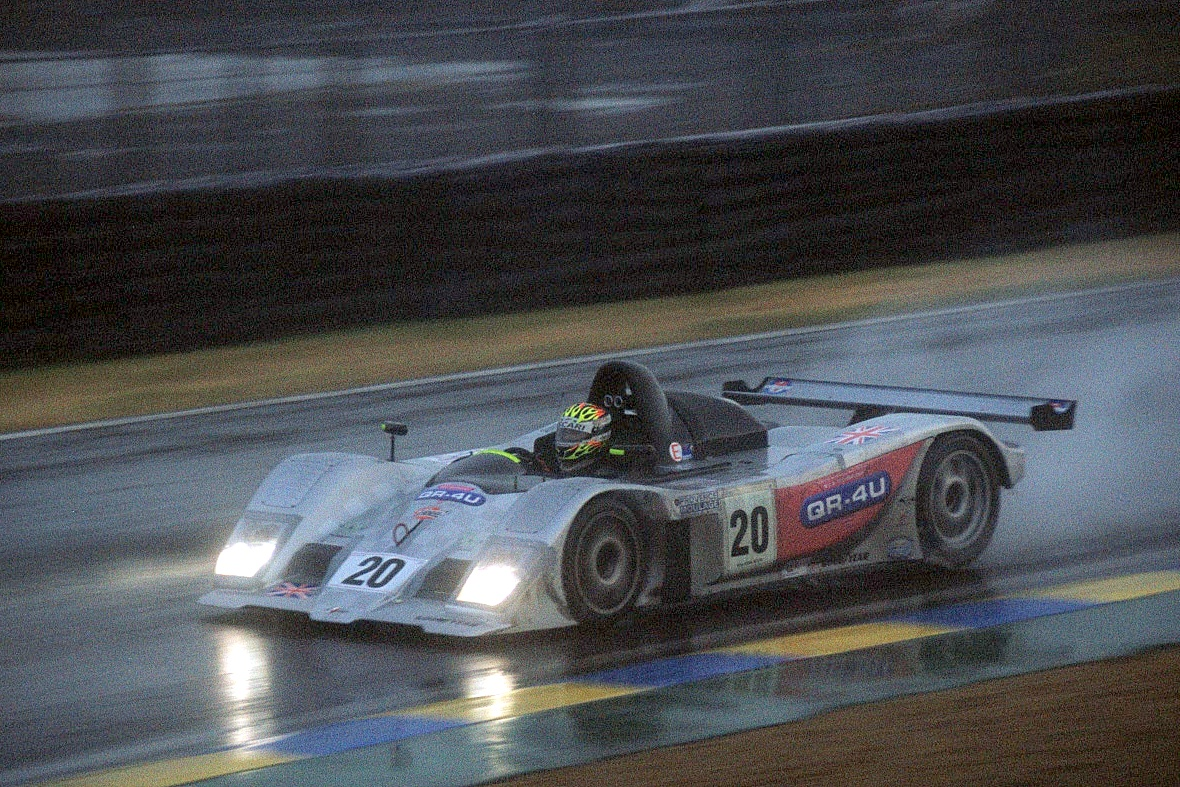
Ascari A410 at the 2001 24 Hours of Le Mans

Mike Phillips attempted to enter an A410 at the 24 Hours of Daytona in 2001, but did not attend the race. The Sports Racing World Cup had been renamed to the FIA Sportscar Championship, but the A410, now driven by Lupberger and Ben Collins, started the season as it had finished 2000; with a retirement, although it did last for 74 laps before blowing its engine with half an hour to go at Barcelona. Next up was the Donington Park of the European Le Mans Series, which saw both A410s entered; although the A410 of Patrick Lemarié did not make the start of the race, due to engine problems, Lupberger and Collins were classified 23rd, having retired after 54 minutes – and 35 laps – due to another gearbox problem. The 1000 km of Monza, part of the FIA Sportscar Championship, saw the first success for the A410; Collins and Lupberger brought their car home in second, 7 seconds behind the Ferrari 333SP-Judd of Giovanni Lavaggi and Christian Vann. The upturn in form continued at Spa-Francorchamps, where Collins and Lupberger brought the A410 home in fourth, a lap down, but having set the second fastest lap of the race. Lupberger and Collins were partnered by Harri Toivonen for the 24 Hours of Le Mans in the A410-001 chassis, whilst Zwart partnered Xavier Pompidou and Scott Maxwell in the other; neither finished, as the A410-001 retired due to fuel pump issue after 11 hours and 134 laps, and the other car crashed out after 15 hours and 66 laps. Having returned to the FIA Sportscar Championship, Collins and Lupberger took a pair of fourth-place finishes, at Brno and Magny-Cours. The team went even better at Donington Park; Collins and Lupberger won by almost a minute, for the car's maiden victory. The penultimate round of the season, held at Mondello Park, was a little less successful, as the team finished ninth overall, and sixth in the SR1 class. In the final race of the season, held at the Nürburgring, the car was disqualified from third place due to issues with its dimensions. Team Ascari finished the season in fourth, with 71 points; nine behind Racing for Holland in third, but 30 ahead of R&M in fifth. The team's one European Le Mans Series race resulted in them being classified in eighth, with 11 points.

=== KZR-1 (2002–2003) ===
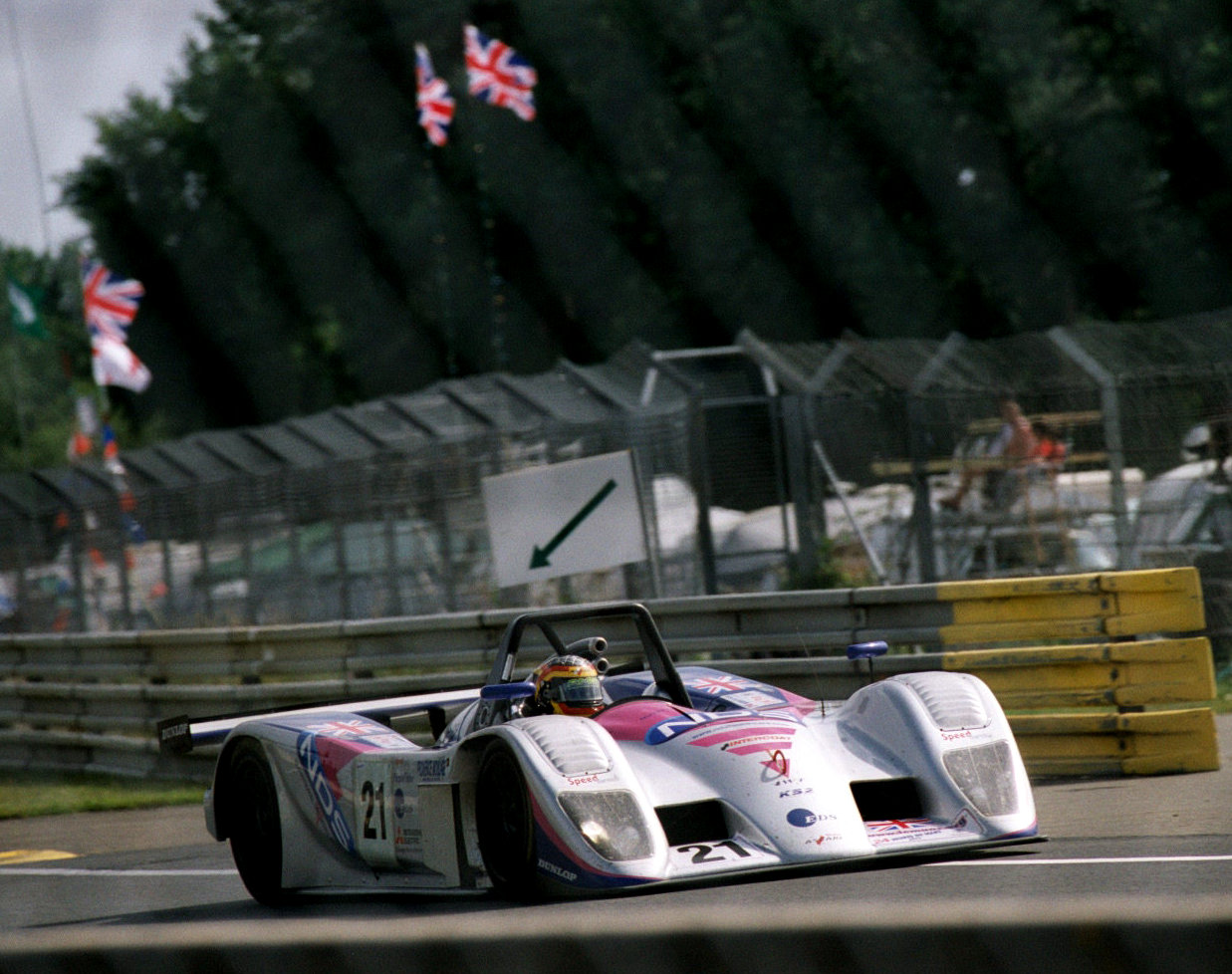
Ascari KZR-1 at the 2002 24 Hours of Le Mans

Following the cars' export to America, the KZR-1s made their first appearance under the new name at the 24 Hours of Daytona; Lupberger and Toivonen were partnered by T. J. Bell in the A410-001 chassis, whilst Collins, Zwart and Vann drove the A410-002 chassis, which was also fitted with a BMW 4-litre V8 engine. Neither car had a successful race; the A410-001 was classified 38th overall, and ninth in the SRP class, but retired due to a blown engine after 15 hours and 429 laps, whilst the other car was classified 70th, and 16th in class, due to electrical issues after six hours and 116 laps. For the 12 Hours of Sebring, Kristian Kolby replaced Toivonen, and Justin Wilson replaced Zwart, and the team were a little more successful; Collins, Vann and Wilson finished sixth overall, whilst the other car was brought home in 29th overall, and tenth in class. For the 24 Hours of Le Mans, Team Ascari were only allowed to enter one KZR-1, selecting Lupberger, Collins and Bell to drive it; however, an accident caused by suspension failure after an hour, and 17 laps, forced the team to retire. Team Ascari's last entry of the season came at the Cadillac Grand Prix, but neither car competed in the race. Team Ascari were classified tenth in the ALMS Team's Championship, with 19 points.

For 2003, the KZR-1s returned to Europe, and Lupberger, Zwart and Charles Hall drove one in the third round of the FIA Sportscar Championship, held at Monza, finishing second overall, albeit a minute and a half behind the winner. Zwart and Lupberger were less successful at the Donington Park round, as the KZR-1 experienced driveshaft failure with just over 15 minutes remaining, having completed 83 laps. Although Team Ascari lodged an entry for the 1000 km of Spa, they did not actually attend the race, and the car was retired. Their single race finish saw them finish joint-seventh in the FIA Sportscar Championship Team's standings, level with Promec Engineering on eight points. From this point onwards, Ascari switched their focus to the production of the Ascari KZ1 supercar – which formed the basis of the KZ1-R GT3 racing car – and racing Zwart's classic Formula One cars in the EuroBOSS series.
