= Ascari Cars =

British automobile manufacturer

Ascari Cars Ltd.
- Type: Private
- Industry: Automotive
- Founded: December 2, 1994; 31 years ago
- Defunct: 2010; 16 years ago
- Fate: Bankruptcy
- Headquarters: Banbury, Oxfordshire, England
- Key people: Geoff Finlay ceo
- Products: Automobiles
- Owner: Klaas Zwart
- Website: ascari.net

Ascari Cars Ltd. was a British automobile manufacturer based in Banbury, England, and founded by Klaas Zwart. Zwart was the former chairman and majority owner of oil and gas company Petroline, which designed and manufactured its own downhole technology. Ascari filed for bankruptcy in 2010.

The company was named after Alberto Ascari (1918–1955), the first double winner of the World Championship of Drivers.

== History ==
Ascari Cars was established in Dorset in 1994. Its first limited-edition car, the Ascari Ecosse, was launched in 1998.

In 2000 Ascari Cars built a new facility in Banbury, Oxfordshire. Ascari Car's second car, the Ascari KZ1, was developed at Banbury, which also housed Team Ascari's racing assets. The premises are now occupied by Haas F1 Team.

Due to declining sales of the Ascari KZ1 and the high cost of production Ascari suffered heavy financial losses. The company filed for bankruptcy in 2010.

=== Road cars ===
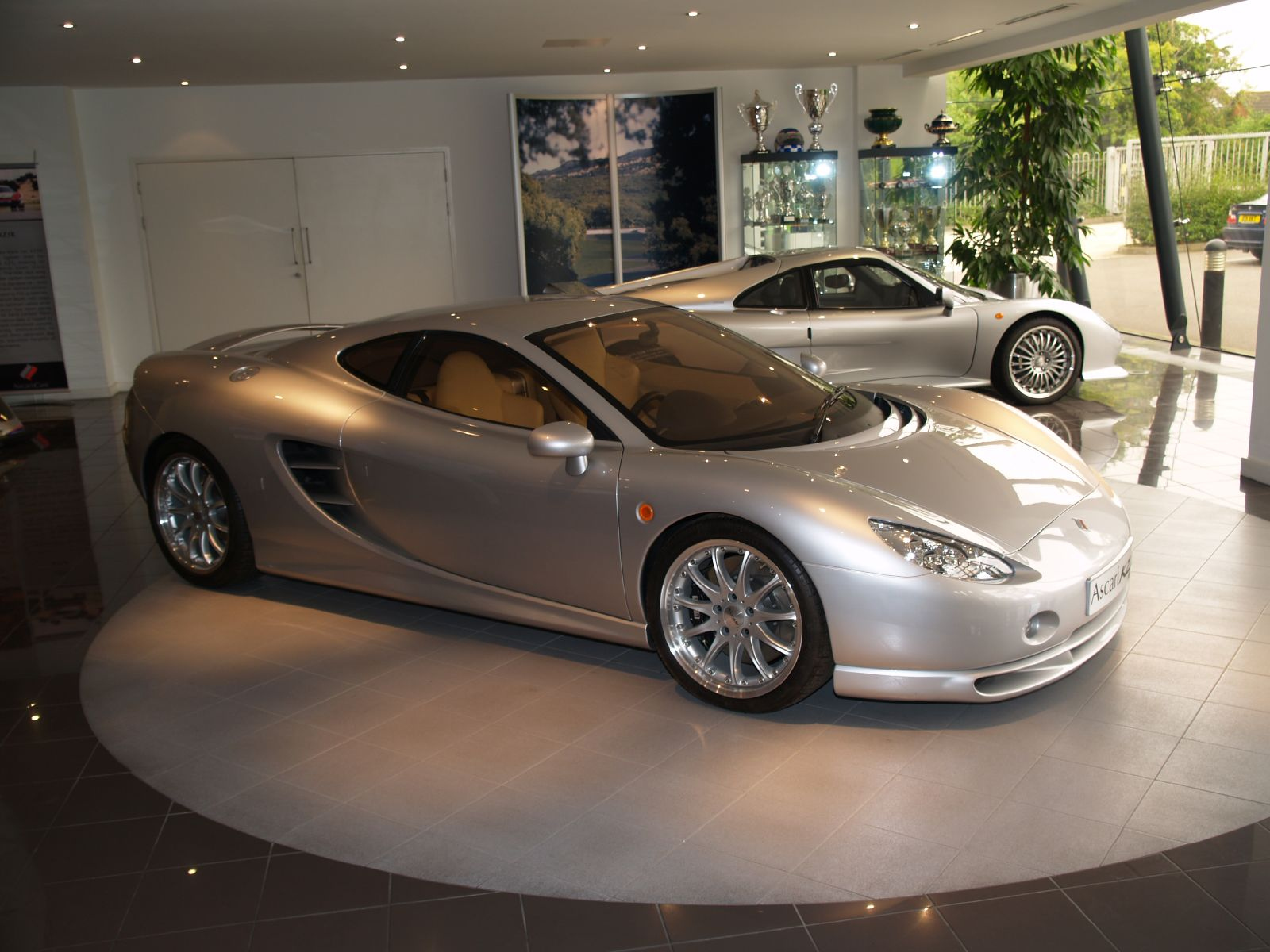
An Ascari KZ1 (foreground) and Ecosse on display.

Year	Model	Details
1995	Ascari FGT	Initial concept car created for racing
1998	Ascari Ecosse	Production version of the FGT
2003	Ascari KZ1	Production version of A410 Race car
2005	Ascari KZ1-R	Road-going version of the KZ1-R GT3 race car
2006	Ascari A10	Upgraded version of the KZ1

=== Race cars ===
Year	Model	Details
1995	Ascari FGT	Racing version of the FGT concept, run in the British GT Championship
2000	Ascari A410	Le Mans Prototype
2002	Ascari KZR-1	Upgraded version of the A410
2005	Ascari KZ1-R GT3	Racing version of the KZ1, running in the FIA GT3 class

== Team Ascari ==
Team Ascari was the racing team of Ascari Cars, also founded by Klaas Zwart to race in the BOSS GP Series, where it won 7 drivers and 7 team titles. The team also participated in endurance events with the Ascari A410.

== See also ==
- List of car manufacturers of the United Kingdom
