= Werner Lupberger =

South African racing driver (born 1975)

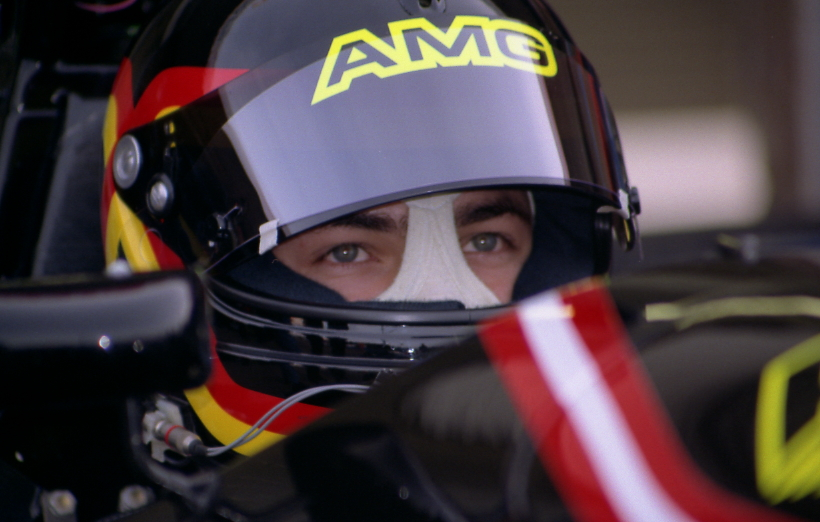
- Nationality: (South Africa) South African
- Born: 15 December 1975 (age 50) Pretoria (South Africa)
- Debut season: 1992
- Former teams: Amg engineering RSA, DAW racing, Fred Godhard Racing, Edenbridge Racing, Ascari, Team Nasamax.
- Starts: 174
- Wins: 26
- Poles: 32
- Fastest laps: 11

Werner Lupberger (born 15 December 1975, in Pretoria) is a South African racing driver. He has competed in such series as the British Formula Three Championship, Italian Formula 3000 and International Formula 3000.

== Complete International Formula 3000 results ==
(key) (Races in bold indicate pole position; races in italics indicate fastest lap.)

| Year | Entrant | 1 | 2 | 3 | 4 | 5 | 6 | 7 | 8 | 9 | 10 | 11 | 12 | Pos. | Pts |
|---|---|---|---|---|---|---|---|---|---|---|---|---|---|---|---|
| 1997 | Edenbridge Racing | SIL; 11 | PAU; DNQ | HEL; DNQ | NÜR; 18 | PER; Ret | HOC; 14 | A1R; Ret | SPA; 13 | MUG; 11 | JER; 4 | | | 18th | 3 |
| 1998 | Edenbridge Racing | OSC; Ret | IMO; 13 | CAT; 12 | SIL; 18 | MON; 14 | PAU; Ret | A1R; 16 | HOC; 8 | HUN; 17 | SPA; 11 | PER; 6 | NÜR; Ret | 23rd | 1 |

== Complete Italian Formula 3000 results ==
(key) (Races in bold indicate pole position; races in italics indicate fastest lap)

| Year | Entrant | 1 | 2 | 3 | 4 | 5 | 6 | 7 | DC | Points |
|---|---|---|---|---|---|---|---|---|---|---|
| 1999 | Edenbridge Racing | VLL; 6 | MNZ; 3 | PER; 6 | DON; 1 | MIS; 3 | MIS; 2 | IMO; 4 | **2nd** | **23** |
