= 2000 SportsRacing World Cup Barcelona =

Layout of the Circuit de Catalunya (1995–2003)

The 2000 SportsRacing World Cup Barcelona was the first race of the 2000 SportsRacing World Cup season held at Circuit de Catalunya and ran a distance of two hours and thirty minutes. It took place on March 26, 2000.

The race was won by the No. 1 JMB Giesse Team Ferrari entry with drivers Christian Pescatori and David Terrien in the Ferrari 333 SP.

== Official results ==
Class winners in bold. Cars failing to complete 75% of winner's distance marked as Not Classified (NC).

Pos	Class	No	Team	Drivers	Chassis	Tyre	Laps
Pos	Class	No	Team	Drivers	Engine	Tyre	Laps
1	**SR**	**1**	**(France) JMB Giesse Team Ferrari**	**(France) David Terrien** **(Italy) Christian Pescatori**	**Ferrari 333 SP**	P	**90**
1	**SR**	**1**	**(France) JMB Giesse Team Ferrari**	**(France) David Terrien** **(Italy) Christian Pescatori**	**Ferrari F130E 4.0 L V12**	P	**90**
2	SR	3	(Monaco) GLV Brums	(Italy) Giovanni Lavaggi (Argentina) Nicolás Filiberti	Ferrari 333 SP	G	90
2	SR	3	(Monaco) GLV Brums	(Italy) Giovanni Lavaggi (Argentina) Nicolás Filiberti	Ferrari F130E 4.0 L V12	G	90
3	SR	5	(Italy) R&M	(Italy) Mauro Baldi (South Africa) Gary Formato	Riley & Scott Mk III	G	89
3	SR	5	(Italy) R&M	(Italy) Mauro Baldi (South Africa) Gary Formato	Judd GV4 4.0 L V10	G	89
4	SR	23	(Italy) BMS Scuderia Italia	(Austria) Philipp Peter (Italy) Marco Zadra	Ferrari 333 SP	P	88
4	SR	23	(Italy) BMS Scuderia Italia	(Austria) Philipp Peter (Italy) Marco Zadra	Ferrari F130E 4.0 L V12	P	88
5	SR	22	(Italy) BMS Scuderia Italia	(Switzerland) Lilian Bryner (Switzerland) Enzo Calderari (Italy) Angelo Zadra	Ferrari 333 SP	P	87
5	SR	22	(Italy) BMS Scuderia Italia	(Switzerland) Lilian Bryner (Switzerland) Enzo Calderari (Italy) Angelo Zadra	Ferrari F130E 4.0 L V12	P	87
6	SR	8	(Denmark) Team Den Blå Avis	(Denmark) John Nielsen (Denmark) Thorkild Thyrring	Panoz LMP-1 Roadster-S	P	87
6	SR	8	(Denmark) Team Den Blå Avis	(Denmark) John Nielsen (Denmark) Thorkild Thyrring	Élan 6L8 6.0 L V8	P	87
7	SR	12	(France) Motorola DAMS	(France) Christophe Tinseau (Belgium) Marc Goossens	Cadillac Northstar LMP	P	87
7	SR	12	(France) Motorola DAMS	(France) Christophe Tinseau (Belgium) Marc Goossens	Cadillac Northstar 4.0 L Turbo V8	P	87
8	SR	11	(France) Motorola DAMS	(France) Emmanuel Collard (France) Éric Bernard	Cadillac Northstar LMP	P	87
8	SR	11	(France) Motorola DAMS	(France) Emmanuel Collard (France) Éric Bernard	Cadillac Northstar 4.0 L Turbo V8	P	87
9	SR	28	(Italy) Tampolli Engineering	(Italy) Gianluca Giraudi (Italy) Angelo Lancelotti	Ferrari 333 SP	P	83
9	SR	28	(Italy) Tampolli Engineering	(Italy) Gianluca Giraudi (Italy) Angelo Lancelotti	Ferrari F130E 4.0 L V12	P	83
10	**SRL**	**58**	**(Belgium) EBRT Schroder Motorsport**	**(United Kingdom) Martin Henderson** **(Germany) Heinrich Langfermann**	**Pilbeam MP84**	D	**79**
10	**SRL**	**58**	**(Belgium) EBRT Schroder Motorsport**	**(United Kingdom) Martin Henderson** **(Germany) Heinrich Langfermann**	**Nissan (AER) VQL 3.0 L V6**	D	**79**
11	SRL	99	(France) PiR Bruneau	(France) Marc Rostan (France) Pierre Bruneau	Debora LMP299	A	77
11	SRL	99	(France) PiR Bruneau	(France) Marc Rostan (France) Pierre Bruneau	BMW 3.0 L I6	A	77
12	SR	10	(Germany) Kremer Racing	(Germany) Christian Gläsel (Germany) Ralf Kelleners	Lola B98/10	G	76
12	SR	10	(Germany) Kremer Racing	(Germany) Christian Gläsel (Germany) Ralf Kelleners	Ford 6.0 L V8	G	76
13	SRL	54	(Italy) Siliprandi	(Italy) Pierguiseppe Peroni (Italy) Leonardo Maddalena	Lucchini SR2-99	A	70
13	SRL	54	(Italy) Siliprandi	(Italy) Pierguiseppe Peroni (Italy) Leonardo Maddalena	Alfa Romeo 3.0 L V6	A	70
14	SRL	69	(United Kingdom) Redman Bright	(United Kingdom) Ben Collins (South Africa) Werner Lupberger	Pilbeam MP84	A	58
14	SRL	69	(United Kingdom) Redman Bright	(United Kingdom) Ben Collins (South Africa) Werner Lupberger	Nissan (AER) VQL 3.0 L V6	A	58
DNF	SRL	64	(United Kingdom) Mark Bailey Racing	(United Kingdom) William Hewland (Sweden) Nicke Blom	MBR 972	A	66
DNF	SRL	64	(United Kingdom) Mark Bailey Racing	(United Kingdom) William Hewland (Sweden) Nicke Blom	Rover 6R4 3.0 L V6	A	66
DNF	SRL	60	(Italy) Lucchini Engineering	(Italy) Filippo Francioni (Italy) Salvatore Ronca	Lucchini SR2000	P	60
DNF	SRL	60	(Italy) Lucchini Engineering	(Italy) Filippo Francioni (Italy) Salvatore Ronca	Alfa Romeo 3.0 L V6	P	60
DNF	SRL	66	(Italy) Audisio & Benvenuto Racing	(Italy) Massimo Saccomanno (Italy) Roberto Tonetti	Lucchini SR2-99	A	54
DNF	SRL	66	(Italy) Audisio & Benvenuto Racing	(Italy) Massimo Saccomanno (Italy) Roberto Tonetti	Alfa Romeo 3.0 L V6	A	54
DNF	SR	6	(Netherlands) Dutch National Racing Team	(Netherlands) Alexander van der Lof (Netherlands) Dick Waaijenberg	Ferrari 333 SP	D	53
DNF	SR	6	(Netherlands) Dutch National Racing Team	(Netherlands) Alexander van der Lof (Netherlands) Dick Waaijenberg	Ferrari F130E 4.0 L V12	D	53
DNF	SRL	57	(Italy) Scuderia Giudici	(Italy) Gianni Giudici (Italy) Raffaele Raimondi	Picchio MB1	A	11
DNF	SRL	57	(Italy) Scuderia Giudici	(Italy) Gianni Giudici (Italy) Raffaele Raimondi	Alfa Romeo 3.0 L V6	A	11
DNF	SRL	53	(Italy) GPM Racing Team	(Italy) Angelo Amadori (Italy) Mauro Prospero	Picchio MB1	A	10
DNF	SRL	53	(Italy) GPM Racing Team	(Italy) Angelo Amadori (Italy) Mauro Prospero	BMW 3.0 L I6	A	10
DNF	SRL	63	(United Kingdom) Redman Bright	(United Kingdom) Mark Smithson (United Kingdom) Peter Owen	Pilbeam MP84	A	7
DNF	SRL	63	(United Kingdom) Redman Bright	(United Kingdom) Mark Smithson (United Kingdom) Peter Owen	Nissan (AER) VQL 3.0 L V6	A	7
DNS	SRL	59	(Italy) BM Autosport	(Italy) Massimo Monti (Italy) Renato Nobili	Tampolli SR2 RTA-99	P	0
DNS	SRL	59	(Italy) BM Autosport	(Italy) Massimo Monti (Italy) Renato Nobili	Alfa Romeo 3.0 L V6	P	0

== Statistics ==
- Pole Position - #3 GLV Brums - 1:52.890
- Fastest Lap - #1 JMB Giesse Team Ferrari - 1:35.911

SportsRacing World Cup
Previous race: None	2000 season	Next race: Monza
