= 2000 SportsRacing World Cup Brno =

Layout of the Brno Circuit

The 2000 SportsRacing World Cup Brno was the sixth race for the 2000 SportsRacing World Cup season held at Brno Circuit and ran a distance of two hours and thirty minutes. It took place on August 6, 2000.

The race was won by the No. 1 JMB Giesse Team Ferrari entry with drivers Christian Pescatori and David Terrien in the Ferrari 333 SP.

== Official results ==
Class winners in bold. Cars failing to complete 75% of winner's distance marked as Not Classified (NC).

Pos	Class	No	Team	Drivers	Chassis	Tyre	Laps
Pos	Class	No	Team	Drivers	Engine	Tyre	Laps
1	**SR**	**1**	**(France) JMB Giesse Team Ferrari**	**(France) David Terrien** **(Italy) Christian Pescatori**	**Ferrari 333 SP**	P	**75**
1	**SR**	**1**	**(France) JMB Giesse Team Ferrari**	**(France) David Terrien** **(Italy) Christian Pescatori**	**Ferrari F130E 4.0 L V12**	P	**75**
2	SR	5	(Italy) R&M	(Italy) Mauro Baldi (South Africa) Gary Formato	Riley & Scott Mk III	G	75
2	SR	5	(Italy) R&M	(Italy) Mauro Baldi (South Africa) Gary Formato	Judd GV4 4.0 L V10	G	75
3	SR	3	(Monaco) GLV Brums	(Italy) Giovanni Lavaggi (Argentina) Nicolás Filiberti	Ferrari 333 SP	G	75
3	SR	3	(Monaco) GLV Brums	(Italy) Giovanni Lavaggi (Argentina) Nicolás Filiberti	Ferrari F130E 4.0 L V12	G	75
4	SR	23	(Italy) BMS Scuderia Italia	(Austria) Philipp Peter (Italy) Marco Zadra	Ferrari 333 SP	P	75
4	SR	23	(Italy) BMS Scuderia Italia	(Austria) Philipp Peter (Italy) Marco Zadra	Ferrari F130E 4.0 L V12	P	75
5	SR	8	(Denmark) Team Den Blå Avis	(Denmark) John Nielsen (Germany) Klaus Graf	Panoz LMP-1 Roadster-S	P	74
5	SR	8	(Denmark) Team Den Blå Avis	(Denmark) John Nielsen (Germany) Klaus Graf	Élan 6L8 6.0 L V8	P	74
6	SR	22	(Italy) BMS Scuderia Italia	(Switzerland) Lilian Bryner (Switzerland) Enzo Calderari (Italy) Angelo Zadra	Ferrari 333 SP	P	72
6	SR	22	(Italy) BMS Scuderia Italia	(Switzerland) Lilian Bryner (Switzerland) Enzo Calderari (Italy) Angelo Zadra	Ferrari F130E 4.0 L V12	P	72
7	SR	6	(Netherlands) Dutch National Racing Team	(Netherlands) Alexander van der Lof (Netherlands) Dick Waaijenberg	Ferrari 333 SP	G	72
7	SR	6	(Netherlands) Dutch National Racing Team	(Netherlands) Alexander van der Lof (Netherlands) Dick Waaijenberg	Ferrari F130E 4.0 L V12	G	72
8	**SRL**	**60**	**(Italy) Lucchini Engineering**	**(Italy) Filippo Francioni** **(Italy) Salvatore Ronca**	**Lucchini SR2000**	P	**70**
8	**SRL**	**60**	**(Italy) Lucchini Engineering**	**(Italy) Filippo Francioni** **(Italy) Salvatore Ronca**	**Alfa Romeo 3.0 L V6**	P	**70**
9	SRL	66	(Italy) Audisio & Benvenuto Racing	(Italy) Massimo Saccomanno (Italy) Roberto Tonetti	Lucchini SR2-99	A	70
9	SRL	66	(Italy) Audisio & Benvenuto Racing	(Italy) Massimo Saccomanno (Italy) Roberto Tonetti	Alfa Romeo 3.0 L V6	A	70
10	SR	21	(Italy) Team Durango	(Italy) Andrea de Lorenzi (France) Soheil Ayari	GMS Durango LMP1	G	70
10	SR	21	(Italy) Team Durango	(Italy) Andrea de Lorenzi (France) Soheil Ayari	BMW 4.0 L V8	G	70
11	SRL	63	(United Kingdom) Redman Bright	(United Kingdom) Mark Smithson (United Kingdom) Peter Owen	Pilbeam MP84	A	70
11	SRL	63	(United Kingdom) Redman Bright	(United Kingdom) Mark Smithson (United Kingdom) Peter Owen	Nissan (AER) VQL 3.0 L V6	A	70
12	SRL	59	(Italy) BM Autosport	(Italy) Massimo Monti (Italy) Renato Nobili	Tampolli SR2 RTA-99	P	70
12	SRL	59	(Italy) BM Autosport	(Italy) Massimo Monti (Italy) Renato Nobili	Alfa Romeo 3.0 L V6	P	70
13	SR	16	(Italy) Conrero	(Italy) Felice Tedeschi (Bolivia) Filipe Ortiz	Riley & Scott Mk III	G	69
13	SR	16	(Italy) Conrero	(Italy) Felice Tedeschi (Bolivia) Filipe Ortiz	Ford 4.0 L V8	G	69
14	SRL	52	(Italy) Tampolli Engineering	(Czech Republic) Josef Kopecký (Germany) Josef Robl (Sweden) Niklas Loven (United States) B. J. Zacharias	Tampolli SR2 RTA-99	P	68
14	SRL	52	(Italy) Tampolli Engineering	(Czech Republic) Josef Kopecký (Germany) Josef Robl (Sweden) Niklas Loven (United States) B. J. Zacharias	Alfa Romeo 3.0 L V6	P	68
15	SRL	54	(Italy) Siliprandi	(Italy) Pierguiseppe Peroni (Italy) Leonardo Maddalena	Lucchini SR2-99	A	66
15	SRL	54	(Italy) Siliprandi	(Italy) Pierguiseppe Peroni (Italy) Leonardo Maddalena	Alfa Romeo 3.0 L V6	A	66
16	SRL	53	(Italy) GPM Racing Team	(Italy) Angelo Amadori (Italy) Mauro Prospero	Picchio MB1	A	66
16	SRL	53	(Italy) GPM Racing Team	(Italy) Angelo Amadori (Italy) Mauro Prospero	BMW 3.0 L I6	A	66
17	SRL	72	(Italy) SCI	(Italy) Ranieri Randaccio (Italy) Massimo Perazza	Lucchini SR2000	A	66
17	SRL	72	(Italy) SCI	(Italy) Ranieri Randaccio (Italy) Massimo Perazza	Alfa Romeo 3.0 L V6	A	66
18	SRL	58	(Belgium) EBRT Schroder Motorsport	(United Kingdom) Martin Henderson (United Kingdom) Owen Mildenhall	Pilbeam MP84	D	66
18	SRL	58	(Belgium) EBRT Schroder Motorsport	(United Kingdom) Martin Henderson (United Kingdom) Owen Mildenhall	Nissan (AER) VQL 3.0 L V6	D	66
19	SR	17	(United Kingdom) Team Ascari	(Netherlands) Klaas Zwart (South Africa) Werner Lupberger	Ascari A410	P	54
19	SR	17	(United Kingdom) Team Ascari	(Netherlands) Klaas Zwart (South Africa) Werner Lupberger	Judd GV4 4.0 L V10	P	54
DNF	SRL	57	(Italy) Scuderia Giudici	(Italy) Gianni Giudici (Italy) Raffaele Raimondi	Picchio MB1	A	33
DNF	SRL	57	(Italy) Scuderia Giudici	(Italy) Gianni Giudici (Italy) Raffaele Raimondi	Alfa Romeo 3.0 L V6	A	33
DNF	SRL	99	(France) PiR Bruneau	(France) Pierre Bruneau (Czech Republic) Robert Pergl (France) Dominique Lacaud	Debora LMP299	A	3
DNF	SRL	99	(France) PiR Bruneau	(France) Pierre Bruneau (Czech Republic) Robert Pergl (France) Dominique Lacaud	BMW 3.0 L I6	A	3
DNS	SRL	51	(Italy) Tampolli Engineering	(Italy) Fabian Peroni (France) Michel Ligonnet	Tampolli SR2 RTA-99	P	0
DNS	SRL	51	(Italy) Tampolli Engineering	(Italy) Fabian Peroni (France) Michel Ligonnet	Alfa Romeo 3.0 L V6	P	0

== Statistics ==
- Pole Position - No. 1 JMB Giesse Team Ferrari - 1:49.946
- Fastest Lap - No. 1 JMB Giesse Team Ferrari - 1:52.450

SportsRacing World Cup
Previous race: Road America 500	2000 season	Next race: Donington
