= 2000 SportsRacing World Cup Spa =

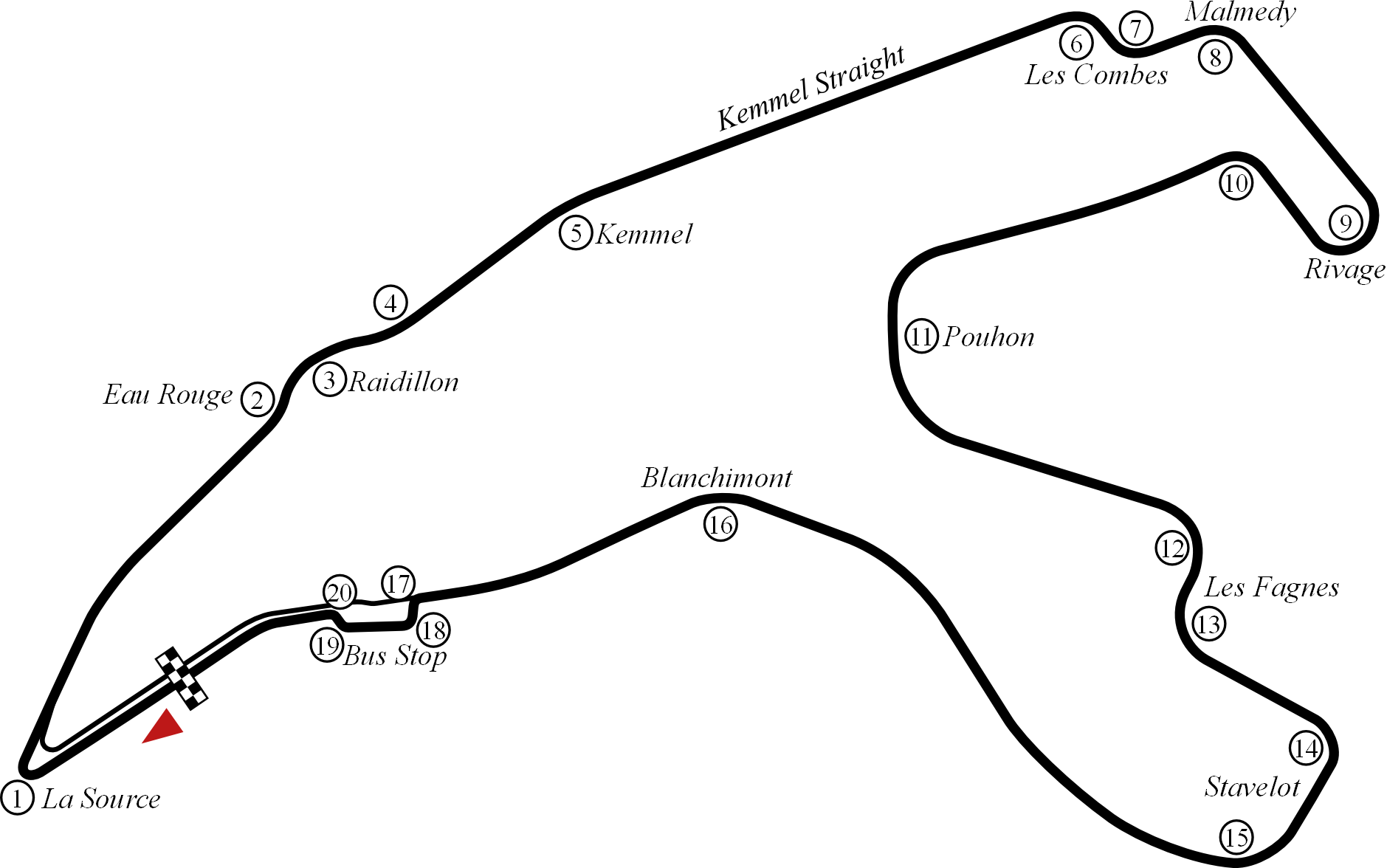
Layout of the Circuit de Spa-Francorchamps

The 2000 SportsRacing World Cup Spa was the third race for the 2000 SportsRacing World Cup season held at Circuit de Spa-Francorchamps and ran a distance of two hours and thirty minutes. It took place on May 21, 2000.

The race was won by the SRL class No. 60 Lucchini Engineering entry with drivers Filippo Francioni and Salvatore Ronca in the Lucchini SR2000.

== Official results ==
Class winners in bold. Cars failing to complete 75% of winner's distance marked as Not Classified (NC).

Pos	Class	No	Team	Drivers	Chassis	Tyre	Laps
Pos	Class	No	Team	Drivers	Engine	Tyre	Laps
1	**SRL**	**60**	**(Italy) Lucchini Engineering**	**(Italy) Filippo Francioni** **(Italy) Salvatore Ronca**	**Lucchini SR2000**	P	**51**
1	**SRL**	**60**	**(Italy) Lucchini Engineering**	**(Italy) Filippo Francioni** **(Italy) Salvatore Ronca**	**Alfa Romeo 3.0 L V6**	P	**51**
2	**SR**	**22**	**(Italy) BMS Scuderia Italia**	**(Switzerland) Lilian Bryner** **(Switzerland) Enzo Calderari** **(Italy) Angelo Zadra**	**Ferrari 333 SP**	P	**51**
2	**SR**	**22**	**(Italy) BMS Scuderia Italia**	**(Switzerland) Lilian Bryner** **(Switzerland) Enzo Calderari** **(Italy) Angelo Zadra**	**Ferrari F130E 4.0 L V12**	P	**51**
3	SR	10	(Germany) Kremer Racing	(Germany) Christian Gläsel (Belgium) Didier de Radigues (United Kingdom) Christian Vann	Lola B98/10	G	51
3	SR	10	(Germany) Kremer Racing	(Germany) Christian Gläsel (Belgium) Didier de Radigues (United Kingdom) Christian Vann	Ford 6.0 L V8	G	51
4	SRL	66	(Italy) Audisio & Benvenuto Racing	(Italy) Massimo Saccomanno (Italy) Roberto Tonetti	Lucchini SR2-99	A	51
4	SRL	66	(Italy) Audisio & Benvenuto Racing	(Italy) Massimo Saccomanno (Italy) Roberto Tonetti	Alfa Romeo 3.0 L V6	A	51
5	SR	1	(France) JMB Giesse Team Ferrari	(France) David Terrien (Italy) Christian Pescatori	Ferrari 333 SP	P	50
5	SR	1	(France) JMB Giesse Team Ferrari	(France) David Terrien (Italy) Christian Pescatori	Ferrari F130E 4.0 L V12	P	50
6	SRL	99	(France) PiR Bruneau	(France) Marc Rostan (France) Pierre Bruneau	Debora LMP299	A	50
6	SRL	99	(France) PiR Bruneau	(France) Marc Rostan (France) Pierre Bruneau	BMW 3.0 L I6	A	50
7	SRL	63	(United Kingdom) Redman Bright	(United Kingdom) Mark Smithson (United Kingdom) Peter Owen	Pilbeam MP84	A	49
7	SRL	63	(United Kingdom) Redman Bright	(United Kingdom) Mark Smithson (United Kingdom) Peter Owen	Nissan (AER) VQL 3.0 L V6	A	49
8	SRL	58	(Belgium) EBRT Schroder Motorsport	(United Kingdom) Martin Henderson (Belgium) Pierre Merche	Pilbeam MP84	D	49
8	SRL	58	(Belgium) EBRT Schroder Motorsport	(United Kingdom) Martin Henderson (Belgium) Pierre Merche	Nissan (AER) VQL 3.0 L V6	D	49
9	SRL	51	(Italy) Tampolli Engineering	(Italy) Fabian Peroni (France) Michel Ligonnet	Tampolli SR2 RTA-99	P	49
9	SRL	51	(Italy) Tampolli Engineering	(Italy) Fabian Peroni (France) Michel Ligonnet	Alfa Romeo 3.0 L V6	P	49
10	SRL	64	(United Kingdom) Mark Bailey Racing	(United Kingdom) Richard Fores (United Kingdom) Simon Harris	MBR 972	A	48
10	SRL	64	(United Kingdom) Mark Bailey Racing	(United Kingdom) Richard Fores (United Kingdom) Simon Harris	Rover 6R4 3.0 L V6	A	48
11	SRL	52	(Italy) Tampolli Engineering	(Portugal) Bernardo Sá Nogueira (Sweden) Nicke Blom	Tampolli SR2 RTA-99	P	46
11	SRL	52	(Italy) Tampolli Engineering	(Portugal) Bernardo Sá Nogueira (Sweden) Nicke Blom	Alfa Romeo 3.0 L V6	P	46
DNF	SRL	59	(Italy) BM Autosport	(Italy) Massimo Monti (Italy) Renato Nobili	Tampolli SR2 RTA-99	P	44
DNF	SRL	59	(Italy) BM Autosport	(Italy) Massimo Monti (Italy) Renato Nobili	Alfa Romeo 3.0 L V6	P	44
DNF	SRL	69	(United Kingdom) Redman Bright	(United Kingdom) Ben Collins (South Africa) Werner Lupberger	Pilbeam MP84	A	37
DNF	SRL	69	(United Kingdom) Redman Bright	(United Kingdom) Ben Collins (South Africa) Werner Lupberger	Nissan (AER) VQL 3.0 L V6	A	37
DNF	SRL	54	(Italy) Siliprandi	(Italy) Pierguiseppe Peroni (Italy) Leonardo Maddalena	Lucchini SR2-99	A	28
DNF	SRL	54	(Italy) Siliprandi	(Italy) Pierguiseppe Peroni (Italy) Leonardo Maddalena	Alfa Romeo 3.0 L V6	A	28
DNF	SR	8	(Denmark) Team Den Blå Avis	(Denmark) John Nielsen (Denmark) Thorkild Thyrring	Panoz LMP-1 Roadster-S	P	22
DNF	SR	8	(Denmark) Team Den Blå Avis	(Denmark) John Nielsen (Denmark) Thorkild Thyrring	Élan 6L8 6.0 L V8	P	22
DNF	SRL	57	(Italy) Scuderia Giudici	(Italy) Gianni Giudici (Italy) Raffaele Raimondi	Picchio MB1	A	20
DNF	SRL	57	(Italy) Scuderia Giudici	(Italy) Gianni Giudici (Italy) Raffaele Raimondi	Alfa Romeo 3.0 L V6	A	20
DNF	SR	12	(France) Motorola DAMS	(France) Christophe Tinseau (Belgium) Marc Goossens	Cadillac Northstar LMP	P	17
DNF	SR	12	(France) Motorola DAMS	(France) Christophe Tinseau (Belgium) Marc Goossens	Cadillac Northstar 4.0 L Turbo V8	P	17
DNF	SRL	72	(Italy) SCI	(Italy) Ranieri Randaccio (Italy) Stefano Sebastiani	Lucchini SR2000	A	17
DNF	SRL	72	(Italy) SCI	(Italy) Ranieri Randaccio (Italy) Stefano Sebastiani	Alfa Romeo 3.0 L V6	A	17
DNF	SR	11	(France) Motorola DAMS	(France) Emmanuel Collard (France) Éric Bernard	Cadillac Northstar LMP	P	14
DNF	SR	11	(France) Motorola DAMS	(France) Emmanuel Collard (France) Éric Bernard	Cadillac Northstar 4.0 L Turbo V8	P	14
DNF	SR	3	(Monaco) GLV Brums	(Italy) Giovanni Lavaggi (Argentina) Nicolás Filiberti	Ferrari 333 SP	G	13
DNF	SR	3	(Monaco) GLV Brums	(Italy) Giovanni Lavaggi (Argentina) Nicolás Filiberti	Ferrari F130E 4.0 L V12	G	13
DNF	SR	6	(Netherlands) Dutch National Racing Team	(Netherlands) Alexander van der Lof (Netherlands) Dick Waaijenberg	Ferrari 333 SP	G	13
DNF	SR	6	(Netherlands) Dutch National Racing Team	(Netherlands) Alexander van der Lof (Netherlands) Dick Waaijenberg	Ferrari F130E 4.0 L V12	G	13
DNF	SRL	53	(Italy) GPM Racing Team	(Italy) Angelo Amadori (Italy) Mauro Prospero	Picchio MB1	A	13
DNF	SRL	53	(Italy) GPM Racing Team	(Italy) Angelo Amadori (Italy) Mauro Prospero	BMW 3.0 L I6	A	13
DNF	SR	23	(Italy) BMS Scuderia Italia	(Austria) Philipp Peter (Italy) Marco Zadra	Ferrari 333 SP	P	2
DNF	SR	23	(Italy) BMS Scuderia Italia	(Austria) Philipp Peter (Italy) Marco Zadra	Ferrari F130E 4.0 L V12	P	2
DNF	SR	16	(Italy) Conrero	(Italy) Beppe Gabbiani (Italy) Angelo Lancelotti	Riley & Scott Mk III	G	2
DNF	SR	16	(Italy) Conrero	(Italy) Beppe Gabbiani (Italy) Angelo Lancelotti	Ford 4.0 L V8	G	2
DNF	SR	5	(Italy) R&M	(Italy) Mauro Baldi (South Africa) Gary Formato	Riley & Scott Mk III	G	0
DNF	SR	5	(Italy) R&M	(Italy) Mauro Baldi (South Africa) Gary Formato	Judd GV4 4.0 L V10	G	0

== Statistics ==
- Pole Position - No. 1 JMB Giesse Team Ferrari - 2:11.612
- Fastest Lap - No. 10 Kremer Racing - 2:32.418

SportsRacing World Cup
Previous race: Monza	2000 season	Next race: Paul Revere 250
