= 2000 SportsRacing World Cup Donington =

Layout of Donington Park

The 2000 SportsRacing World Cup Donington was the seventh race for the 2000 SportsRacing World Cup season held at Donington Park and ran a distance of two hours and thirty minutes. It took place on August 27, 2000.

The race was won by the No. 1 JMB Giesse Team Ferrari entry with drivers Christian Pescatori and David Terrien in the Ferrari 333 SP.

== Official results ==
Class winners in bold. Cars failing to complete 75% of winner's distance marked as Not Classified (NC).

Pos	Class	No	Team	Drivers	Chassis	Tyre	Laps
Pos	Class	No	Team	Drivers	Engine	Tyre	Laps
1	**SR**	**1**	**(France) JMB Giesse Team Ferrari**	**(France) David Terrien** **(Italy) Christian Pescatori**	**Ferrari 333 SP**	P	**95**
1	**SR**	**1**	**(France) JMB Giesse Team Ferrari**	**(France) David Terrien** **(Italy) Christian Pescatori**	**Ferrari F130E 4.0 L V12**	P	**95**
2	SR	23	(Italy) BMS Scuderia Italia	(Austria) Philipp Peter (Italy) Marco Zadra	Ferrari 333 SP	P	94
2	SR	23	(Italy) BMS Scuderia Italia	(Austria) Philipp Peter (Italy) Marco Zadra	Ferrari F130E 4.0 L V12	P	94
3	SR	22	(Italy) BMS Scuderia Italia	(Switzerland) Lilian Bryner (Switzerland) Enzo Calderari (Italy) Angelo Zadra	Ferrari 333 SP	P	91
3	SR	22	(Italy) BMS Scuderia Italia	(Switzerland) Lilian Bryner (Switzerland) Enzo Calderari (Italy) Angelo Zadra	Ferrari F130E 4.0 L V12	P	91
4	**SRL**	**63**	**(United Kingdom) Redman Bright**	**(United Kingdom) Mark Smithson** **(United Kingdom) Peter Owen**	**Pilbeam MP84**	A	**91**
4	**SRL**	**63**	**(United Kingdom) Redman Bright**	**(United Kingdom) Mark Smithson** **(United Kingdom) Peter Owen**	**Nissan 3.0 L V6**	A	**91**
5	SR	28	(Italy) Tampolli Engineering	(Italy) Gianluca Giraudi (United Kingdom) John Burton	Ferrari 333 SP	P	91
5	SR	28	(Italy) Tampolli Engineering	(Italy) Gianluca Giraudi (United Kingdom) John Burton	Ferrari F130E 4.0 L V12	P	91
6	SRL	52	(Italy) Tampolli Engineering	(United Kingdom) Richard Lyons (United Kingdom) Dino Morelli	Tampolli SR2 RTA-99	P	91
6	SRL	52	(Italy) Tampolli Engineering	(United Kingdom) Richard Lyons (United Kingdom) Dino Morelli	Alfa Romeo 3.0 L V6	P	91
7	SR	9	(Denmark) Team Den Blå Avis	(Denmark) Carsten Rae (Denmark) Casper Elgaard	Panoz LMP-1 Roadster-S	P	89
7	SR	9	(Denmark) Team Den Blå Avis	(Denmark) Carsten Rae (Denmark) Casper Elgaard	Élan 6L8 6.0 L V8	P	89
8	SRL	70	(France) Didier Bonnet Racing	(France) Jean-François Yvon (France) David Dussau	Debora LMP2000	A	88
8	SRL	70	(France) Didier Bonnet Racing	(France) Jean-François Yvon (France) David Dussau	BMW 3.0 L I6	A	88
9	SR	21	(Italy) Team Durango	(Italy) Andrea de Lorenzi (France) Jean-Philippe Belloc	GMS Durango LMP1	G	84
9	SR	21	(Italy) Team Durango	(Italy) Andrea de Lorenzi (France) Jean-Philippe Belloc	BMW 4.0 L V8	G	84
10	SRL	51	(Italy) Tampolli Engineering	(Sweden) Niklas Loven (South Africa) Earl Goddard	Tampolli SR2 RTA-99	P	82
10	SRL	51	(Italy) Tampolli Engineering	(Sweden) Niklas Loven (South Africa) Earl Goddard	Alfa Romeo 3.0 L V6	P	82
11	SRL	67	(Belgium) Schroder Motorsport	(Portugal) Bernardo Sá Nogueira (United Kingdom) Graham Morris (Germany) Henrich Langfermann	Pilbeam MP84	D	79
11	SRL	67	(Belgium) Schroder Motorsport	(Portugal) Bernardo Sá Nogueira (United Kingdom) Graham Morris (Germany) Henrich Langfermann	Nissan 3.0 L V6	D	79
DNF	SRL	59	(Italy) BM Autosport	(Italy) Massimo Monti (Italy) Renato Nobili	Tampolli SR2 RTA-99	P	72
DNF	SRL	59	(Italy) BM Autosport	(Italy) Massimo Monti (Italy) Renato Nobili	Alfa Romeo 3.0 L V6	P	72
DNF	SRL	99	(France) PiR Bruneau	(France) Marc Rostan (France) Pierre Bruneau (United Kingdom) Piers Johnson	Debora LMP299	A	69
DNF	SRL	99	(France) PiR Bruneau	(France) Marc Rostan (France) Pierre Bruneau (United Kingdom) Piers Johnson	BMW 3.0 L I6	A	69
DNF	SRL	75	(United Kingdom) Sovereign Racing	(United Kingdom) Ian Flux (United Kingdom) Mike Millard	Rapier 6	D	62
DNF	SRL	75	(United Kingdom) Sovereign Racing	(United Kingdom) Ian Flux (United Kingdom) Mike Millard	Nissan 3.0 L V6	D	62
DNF	SRL	66	(Italy) Audisio & Benvenuto Racing	(Italy) Massimo Saccomanno (Italy) Roberto Tonetti	Lucchini SR2-99	A	58
DNF	SRL	66	(Italy) Audisio & Benvenuto Racing	(Italy) Massimo Saccomanno (Italy) Roberto Tonetti	Alfa Romeo 3.0 L V6	A	58
DNF	SR	3	(Monaco) GLV Brums	(Italy) Giovanni Lavaggi (Argentina) Nicolás Filiberti	Ferrari 333 SP	G	56
DNF	SR	3	(Monaco) GLV Brums	(Italy) Giovanni Lavaggi (Argentina) Nicolás Filiberti	Ferrari F130E 4.0 L V12	G	56
DNF	SRL	58	(Belgium) EBRT Schroder Motorsport	(United Kingdom) Martin Henderson (United Kingdom) Owen Mildenhall	Pilbeam MP84	D	43
DNF	SRL	58	(Belgium) EBRT Schroder Motorsport	(United Kingdom) Martin Henderson (United Kingdom) Owen Mildenhall	Nissan (AER) VQL 3.0 L V6	D	43
DNF	SRL	53	(Italy) GPM Racing Team	(Italy) Angelo Amadori (Italy) Mauro Prospero	Picchio MB1	A	36
DNF	SRL	53	(Italy) GPM Racing Team	(Italy) Angelo Amadori (Italy) Mauro Prospero	BMW 3.0 L I6	A	36
DNF	SR	8	(Denmark) Team Den Blå Avis	(Denmark) John Nielsen (Germany) Klaus Graf	Panoz LMP-1 Roadster-S	P	23
DNF	SR	8	(Denmark) Team Den Blå Avis	(Denmark) John Nielsen (Germany) Klaus Graf	Élan 6L8 6.0 L V8	P	23
DNF	SR	6	(Netherlands) Dutch National Racing Team	(Netherlands) Alexander van der Lof (Netherlands) Dick Waaijenberg	Ferrari 333 SP	G	14
DNF	SR	6	(Netherlands) Dutch National Racing Team	(Netherlands) Alexander van der Lof (Netherlands) Dick Waaijenberg	Ferrari F130E 4.0 L V12	G	14
DNF	SRL	60	(Italy) Lucchini Engineering	(Italy) Filippo Francioni (Italy) Salvatore Ronca	Lucchini SR2000	P	14
DNF	SRL	60	(Italy) Lucchini Engineering	(Italy) Filippo Francioni (Italy) Salvatore Ronca	Alfa Romeo 3.0 L V6	P	14
DNF	SRL	64	(United Kingdom) Mark Bailey Racing	(United Kingdom) Richard Fores (United Kingdom) Adrian Cottrell	MBR 972	A	13
DNF	SRL	64	(United Kingdom) Mark Bailey Racing	(United Kingdom) Richard Fores (United Kingdom) Adrian Cottrell	Rover 6R4 3.0 L V6	A	13
DNF	SRL	72	(Italy) SCI	(Italy) Ranieri Randaccio (Italy) Massimo Perazza	Lucchini SR2000	A	6
DNF	SRL	72	(Italy) SCI	(Italy) Ranieri Randaccio (Italy) Massimo Perazza	Alfa Romeo 3.0 L V6	A	6
DNF	SRL	57	(Italy) Scuderia Giudici	(Italy) Gianni Giudici (Italy) Raffaele Raimondi	Picchio MB1	A	1
DNF	SRL	57	(Italy) Scuderia Giudici	(Italy) Gianni Giudici (Italy) Raffaele Raimondi	Alfa Romeo 3.0 L V6	A	1
DNF	SR	17	(United Kingdom) Team Ascari	(Netherlands) Klaas Zwart (South Africa) Werner Lupberger	Ascari A410	P	0
DNF	SR	17	(United Kingdom) Team Ascari	(Netherlands) Klaas Zwart (South Africa) Werner Lupberger	Judd GV4 4.0 L V10	P	0
DNF	SR	5	(Italy) R&M	(Italy) Mauro Baldi (South Africa) Gary Formato	Riley & Scott Mk III	G	0
DNF	SR	5	(Italy) R&M	(Italy) Mauro Baldi (South Africa) Gary Formato	Judd GV4 4.0 L V10	G	0
DNF	SR	32	(United Kingdom) Harrier Racing	(United Kingdom) Ben Collins (United Kingdom) Richard Jones (Netherlands) Michael Vergers	Harrier LR10	G	0
DNF	SR	32	(United Kingdom) Harrier Racing	(United Kingdom) Ben Collins (United Kingdom) Richard Jones (Netherlands) Michael Vergers	Porsche 3.8 L Turbo Flat-6	G	0
DNS	SR	16	(Italy) Conrero	(Italy) Felice Tedeschi (Italy) Felice Tedeschi	Riley & Scott Mk III	G	0
DNS	SR	16	(Italy) Conrero	(Italy) Felice Tedeschi (Italy) Felice Tedeschi	Ford 4.0 L V8	G	0

== Statistics ==
- Pole Position - No. 1 JMB Giesse Team Ferrari - 1:40.2180
- Fastest Lap - No. 1 JMB Giesse Team Ferrari - 1:27.500

SportsRacing World Cup
Previous race: Brno	2000 season	Next race: Nürburgring
