= 2000 SportsRacing World Cup Nürburgring =

Layout of the Nürburgring

The 2000 SportsRacing World Cup Nürburgring was the eighth race for the 2000 SportsRacing World Cup season held at the Nürburgring and ran a distance of two hours and thirty minutes. It took place on September 17, 2000.

The race was won by the No. 1 JMB Giesse Team Ferrari entry with drivers Christian Pescatori and David Terrien in the Ferrari 333 SP. The JMB duo also wrapped up the SR drivers' title with two races to spare.

== Official results ==
Class winners in bold. Cars failing to complete 75% of winner's distance marked as Not Classified (NC).

Pos	Class	No	Team	Drivers	Chassis	Tyre	Laps
Pos	Class	No	Team	Drivers	Engine	Tyre	Laps
1	**SR**	**1**	**(France) JMB Giesse Team Ferrari**	**(France) David Terrien** **(Italy) Christian Pescatori**	**Ferrari 333 SP**	P	**81**
1	**SR**	**1**	**(France) JMB Giesse Team Ferrari**	**(France) David Terrien** **(Italy) Christian Pescatori**	**Ferrari F130E 4.0 L V12**	P	**81**
2	SR	23	(Italy) BMS Scuderia Italia	(Austria) Philipp Peter (Italy) Marco Zadra	Ferrari 333 SP	P	81
2	SR	23	(Italy) BMS Scuderia Italia	(Austria) Philipp Peter (Italy) Marco Zadra	Ferrari F130E 4.0 L V12	P	81
3	SR	15	(Germany) Konrad Motorsport	(Austria) Franz Konrad (Germany) Sascha Maassen (Germany) Jürgen von Gartzen	Lola B2K/10	D	81
3	SR	15	(Germany) Konrad Motorsport	(Austria) Franz Konrad (Germany) Sascha Maassen (Germany) Jürgen von Gartzen	Ford 6.0 L V8	D	81
4	SR	8	(Denmark) Team Den Blå Avis	(Denmark) John Nielsen (Denmark) Casper Elgaard	Panoz LMP-1 Roadster-S	P	80
4	SR	8	(Denmark) Team Den Blå Avis	(Denmark) John Nielsen (Denmark) Casper Elgaard	Élan 6L8 6.0 L V8	P	80
5	SR	3	(Monaco) GLV Brums	(Italy) Giovanni Lavaggi (Argentina) Nicolás Filiberti	Ferrari 333 SP	G	80
5	SR	3	(Monaco) GLV Brums	(Italy) Giovanni Lavaggi (Argentina) Nicolás Filiberti	Ferrari F130E 4.0 L V12	G	80
6	SR	10	(Germany) Kremer Racing	(Germany) Ralf Kelleners (Germany) Norman Simon	Lola B98/10	G	79
6	SR	10	(Germany) Kremer Racing	(Germany) Ralf Kelleners (Germany) Norman Simon	Ford 6.0 L V8	G	79
7	SR	22	(Italy) BMS Scuderia Italia	(Switzerland) Lilian Bryner (Switzerland) Enzo Calderari (Italy) Angelo Zadra	Ferrari 333 SP	P	78
7	SR	22	(Italy) BMS Scuderia Italia	(Switzerland) Lilian Bryner (Switzerland) Enzo Calderari (Italy) Angelo Zadra	Ferrari F130E 4.0 L V12	P	78
8	SR	6	(Netherlands) Dutch National Racing Team	(Netherlands) Alexander van der Lof (Netherlands) Dick Waaijenberg	Ferrari 333 SP	G	78
8	SR	6	(Netherlands) Dutch National Racing Team	(Netherlands) Alexander van der Lof (Netherlands) Dick Waaijenberg	Ferrari F130E 4.0 L V12	G	78
9	SR	28	(Italy) Tampolli Engineering	(Italy) Gianluca Giraudi (Italy) Rory Parasitili	Ferrari 333 SP	P	77
9	SR	28	(Italy) Tampolli Engineering	(Italy) Gianluca Giraudi (Italy) Rory Parasitili	Ferrari F130E 4.0 L V12	P	77
10	SR	9	(Denmark) Team Den Blå Avis	(Denmark) Carsten Rae (Denmark) Jesper Carlsen (United Kingdom) Jason Watt	Panoz LMP-1 Roadster-S	P	77
10	SR	9	(Denmark) Team Den Blå Avis	(Denmark) Carsten Rae (Denmark) Jesper Carlsen (United Kingdom) Jason Watt	Élan 6L8 6.0 L V8	P	77
11	SR	27	(United States) Doran Lista	(Belgium) Didier Theys (Switzerland) Fredy Lienhard	Ferrari 333 SP	Y	77
11	SR	27	(United States) Doran Lista	(Belgium) Didier Theys (Switzerland) Fredy Lienhard	Judd GV4 4.0 L V10	Y	77
12	**SRL**	**66**	**(Italy) Audisio & Benvenuto Racing**	**(Italy) Massimo Saccomanno** **(Italy) Roberto Tonetti**	**Lucchini SR2-99**	A	**75**
12	**SRL**	**66**	**(Italy) Audisio & Benvenuto Racing**	**(Italy) Massimo Saccomanno** **(Italy) Roberto Tonetti**	**Alfa Romeo 3.0 L V6**	A	**75**
13	SRL	54	(Italy) Siliprandi	(Italy) Pierguiseppe Peroni (Italy) Mauro Prospero	Lucchini SR2-99	A	75
13	SRL	54	(Italy) Siliprandi	(Italy) Pierguiseppe Peroni (Italy) Mauro Prospero	Alfa Romeo 3.0 L V6	A	75
14	SRL	57	(Italy) Scuderia Giudici	(Italy) Gianni Giudici (Italy) Raffaele Raimondi	Picchio MB1	A	75
14	SRL	57	(Italy) Scuderia Giudici	(Italy) Gianni Giudici (Italy) Raffaele Raimondi	Alfa Romeo 3.0 L V6	A	75
15	SRL	52	(Italy) Tampolli Engineering	(Italy) Leonardo Maddalena (Italy) "Linos"	Tampolli SR2 RTA-99	P	74
15	SRL	52	(Italy) Tampolli Engineering	(Italy) Leonardo Maddalena (Italy) "Linos"	Alfa Romeo 3.0 L V6	P	74
16	SRL	70	(France) Didier Bonnet Racing	(France) Jean-François Yvon (France) Pascal Fabre	Debora LMP2000	A	74
16	SRL	70	(France) Didier Bonnet Racing	(France) Jean-François Yvon (France) Pascal Fabre	BMW 3.0 L I6	A	74
17	SRL	99	(France) PiR Bruneau	(France) Marc Rostan (France) Pierre Bruneau	Debora LMP299	A	72
17	SRL	99	(France) PiR Bruneau	(France) Marc Rostan (France) Pierre Bruneau	BMW 3.0 L I6	A	72
18	SRL	72	(Italy) SCI	(Italy) Ranieri Randaccio (Italy) Massimo Perazza	Lucchini SR2000	A	72
18	SRL	72	(Italy) SCI	(Italy) Ranieri Randaccio (Italy) Massimo Perazza	Alfa Romeo 3.0 L V6	A	72
19	SRL	67	(Belgium) Schroder Motorsport	(Portugal) Bernardo Sá Nogueira (United Kingdom) "Frederico Careca" (Belgium) Pierre Merche	Pilbeam MP84	D	71
19	SRL	67	(Belgium) Schroder Motorsport	(Portugal) Bernardo Sá Nogueira (United Kingdom) "Frederico Careca" (Belgium) Pierre Merche	Nissan (AER) VQL 3.0 L V6	D	71
20	SRL	51	(Italy) Tampolli Engineering	(Sweden) Niklas Loven (United Kingdom) Dino Morelli	Tampolli SR2 RTA-99	P	55
20	SRL	51	(Italy) Tampolli Engineering	(Sweden) Niklas Loven (United Kingdom) Dino Morelli	Alfa Romeo 3.0 L V6	P	55
21	SRL	63	(United Kingdom) Redman Bright	(United Kingdom) Mark Smithson (United Kingdom) Peter Owen	Pilbeam MP84	A	53
21	SRL	63	(United Kingdom) Redman Bright	(United Kingdom) Mark Smithson (United Kingdom) Peter Owen	Nissan (AER) VQL 3.0 L V6	A	53
DNF	SR	21	(Italy) Team Durango	(Italy) Andrea de Lorenzi (France) Soheil Ayari	GMS Durango LMP1	G	52
DNF	SR	21	(Italy) Team Durango	(Italy) Andrea de Lorenzi (France) Soheil Ayari	BMW 4.0 L V8	G	52
DNF	SR	14	(Germany) Thomas Bscher Promotions	(Germany) Thomas Bscher (United Kingdom) Geoff Lees	BMW V12 LM	Y	46
DNF	SR	14	(Germany) Thomas Bscher Promotions	(Germany) Thomas Bscher (United Kingdom) Geoff Lees	BMW S70/3 6.0 L V12	Y	46
DNF	SRL	60	(Italy) Lucchini Engineering	(Italy) Filippo Francioni (Italy) Salvatore Ronca	Lucchini SR2000	P	45
DNF	SRL	60	(Italy) Lucchini Engineering	(Italy) Filippo Francioni (Italy) Salvatore Ronca	Alfa Romeo 3.0 L V6	P	45
DNF	SR	5	(Italy) R&M	(Italy) Mauro Baldi (South Africa) Gary Formato	Riley & Scott Mk III	G	27
DNF	SR	5	(Italy) R&M	(Italy) Mauro Baldi (South Africa) Gary Formato	Judd GV4 4.0 L V10	G	27
DNF	SR	17	(United Kingdom) Team Ascari	(Netherlands) Klaas Zwart (South Africa) Werner Lupberger	Ascari A410	P	27
DNF	SR	17	(United Kingdom) Team Ascari	(Netherlands) Klaas Zwart (South Africa) Werner Lupberger	Judd GV4 4.0 L V10	P	27
DNF	SRL	58	(Belgium) EBRT Schroder Motorsport	(United Kingdom) Martin Henderson (United Kingdom) Owen Mildenhall	Pilbeam MP84	D	19
DNF	SRL	58	(Belgium) EBRT Schroder Motorsport	(United Kingdom) Martin Henderson (United Kingdom) Owen Mildenhall	Nissan (AER) VQL 3.0 L V6	D	19
DNF	SR	16	(Italy) Conrero	(Italy) Beppe Gabbiani (Italy) Felice Tedeschi (Bolivia) Filipe Ortiz	Riley & Scott Mk III	G	13
DNF	SR	16	(Italy) Conrero	(Italy) Beppe Gabbiani (Italy) Felice Tedeschi (Bolivia) Filipe Ortiz	Ford 4.0 L V8	G	13
DNF	SRL	59	(Italy) BM Autosport	(Italy) Massimo Monti (Italy) Renato Nobili	Tampolli SR2 RTA-99	P	8
DNF	SRL	59	(Italy) BM Autosport	(Italy) Massimo Monti (Italy) Renato Nobili	Alfa Romeo 3.0 L V6	P	8

== Statistics ==
- Pole Position - No. 10 Kremer Racing - 1:46.955
- Fastest Lap - No. 1 JMB Giesse Team Ferrari - 1:41.119

SportsRacing World Cup
Previous race: Donington	2000 season	Next race: Magny-Cours
