= 2000 SportsRacing World Cup Monza =

Layout of the Autodromo Nazionale Monza

The 2000 SportsRacing World Cup Monza was the second race for the 2000 SportsRacing World Cup season held at Autodromo Nazionale Monza and ran a distance of two hours and thirty minutes. It took place on April 16, 2000.

The race was won by the No. 5 R&M entry with drivers Mauro Baldi and Gary Formato in the Riley & Scott Mk III.

== Official results ==
Class winners in bold. Cars failing to complete 75% of winner's distance marked as Not Classified (NC).

Pos	Class	No	Team	Drivers	Chassis	Tyre	Laps
Pos	Class	No	Team	Drivers	Engine	Tyre	Laps
1	**SR**	**5**	**(Italy) R&M**	**(Italy) Mauro Baldi** **(South Africa) Gary Formato**	**Riley & Scott Mk III**	G	**87**
1	**SR**	**5**	**(Italy) R&M**	**(Italy) Mauro Baldi** **(South Africa) Gary Formato**	**Judd GV4 4.0 L V10**	G	**87**
2	SR	1	(France) JMB Giesse Team Ferrari	(France) David Terrien (Italy) Christian Pescatori	Ferrari 333 SP	P	87
2	SR	1	(France) JMB Giesse Team Ferrari	(France) David Terrien (Italy) Christian Pescatori	Ferrari F130E 4.0 L V12	P	87
3	SR	8	(Denmark) Team Den Blå Avis	(Denmark) John Nielsen (Denmark) Thorkild Thyrring	Panoz LMP-1 Roadster-S	P	87
3	SR	8	(Denmark) Team Den Blå Avis	(Denmark) John Nielsen (Denmark) Thorkild Thyrring	Élan 6L8 6.0 L V8	P	87
4	SR	12	(France) Motorola DAMS	(France) Christophe Tinseau (Belgium) Marc Goossens	Cadillac Northstar LMP	P	86
4	SR	12	(France) Motorola DAMS	(France) Christophe Tinseau (Belgium) Marc Goossens	Cadillac Northstar 4.0 L Turbo V8	P	86
5	SR	22	(Italy) BMS Scuderia Italia	(Switzerland) Lilian Bryner (Switzerland) Enzo Calderari (Italy) Angelo Zadra	Ferrari 333 SP	P	84
5	SR	22	(Italy) BMS Scuderia Italia	(Switzerland) Lilian Bryner (Switzerland) Enzo Calderari (Italy) Angelo Zadra	Ferrari F130E 4.0 L V12	P	84
6	SR	6	(Netherlands) Dutch National Racing Team	(Netherlands) Alexander van der Lof (Netherlands) Dick Waaijenberg	Ferrari 333 SP	D	83
6	SR	6	(Netherlands) Dutch National Racing Team	(Netherlands) Alexander van der Lof (Netherlands) Dick Waaijenberg	Ferrari F130E 4.0 L V12	D	83
7	**SRL**	**63**	**(United Kingdom) Redman Bright**	**(United Kingdom) Mark Smithson** **(United Kingdom) Peter Owen**	**Pilbeam MP84**	A	**81**
7	**SRL**	**63**	**(United Kingdom) Redman Bright**	**(United Kingdom) Mark Smithson** **(United Kingdom) Peter Owen**	**Nissan (AER) VQL 3.0 L V6**	A	**81**
8	SRL	60	(Italy) Lucchini Engineering	(Italy) Filippo Francioni (Italy) Salvatore Ronca	Lucchini SR2000	P	79
8	SRL	60	(Italy) Lucchini Engineering	(Italy) Filippo Francioni (Italy) Salvatore Ronca	Alfa Romeo 3.0 L V6	P	79
9	SRL	53	(Italy) GPM Racing Team	(Italy) Angelo Amadori (Italy) Mauro Prospero	Picchio MB1	A	75
9	SRL	53	(Italy) GPM Racing Team	(Italy) Angelo Amadori (Italy) Mauro Prospero	BMW 3.0 L I6	A	75
10	SRL	66	(Italy) Audisio & Benvenuto Racing	(Italy) Massimo Saccomanno (Italy) Roberto Tonetti	Lucchini SR2-99	A	68
10	SRL	66	(Italy) Audisio & Benvenuto Racing	(Italy) Massimo Saccomanno (Italy) Roberto Tonetti	Alfa Romeo 3.0 L V6	A	68
DNF	SR	28	(Italy) Tampolli Engineering	(Italy) Gianluca Giraudi (Italy) Angelo Lancelotti	Ferrari 333 SP	P	58
DNF	SR	28	(Italy) Tampolli Engineering	(Italy) Gianluca Giraudi (Italy) Angelo Lancelotti	Ferrari F130E 4.0 L V12	P	58
DNF	SRL	51	(Italy) Tampolli Engineering	(Italy) Fabian Peroni (France) Michel Ligonnet	Tampolli SR2 RTA-99	P	58
DNF	SRL	51	(Italy) Tampolli Engineering	(Italy) Fabian Peroni (France) Michel Ligonnet	Alfa Romeo 3.0 L V6	P	58
DNF	SR	3	(Monaco) GLV Brums	(Italy) Giovanni Lavaggi (Argentina) Nicolás Filiberti	Ferrari 333 SP	G	57
DNF	SR	3	(Monaco) GLV Brums	(Italy) Giovanni Lavaggi (Argentina) Nicolás Filiberti	Ferrari F130E 4.0 L V12	G	57
DNF	SRL	99	(France) PiR Bruneau	(France) Marc Rostan (France) Pierre Bruneau	Debora LMP299	A	56
DNF	SRL	99	(France) PiR Bruneau	(France) Marc Rostan (France) Pierre Bruneau	BMW 3.0 L I6	A	56
DNF	SR	10	(Germany) Kremer Racing	(Germany) Christian Gläsel (Germany) Ralf Kelleners	Lola B98/10	G	55
DNF	SR	10	(Germany) Kremer Racing	(Germany) Christian Gläsel (Germany) Ralf Kelleners	Ford 6.0 L V8	G	55
DNF	SRL	59	(Italy) BM Autosport	(Italy) Massimo Monti (Italy) Renato Nobili	Tampolli SR2 RTA-99	P	43
DNF	SRL	59	(Italy) BM Autosport	(Italy) Massimo Monti (Italy) Renato Nobili	Alfa Romeo 3.0 L V6	P	43
DNF	SRL	69	(United Kingdom) Redman Bright	(United Kingdom) Ben Collins (South Africa) Werner Lupberger	Pilbeam MP84	A	38
DNF	SRL	69	(United Kingdom) Redman Bright	(United Kingdom) Ben Collins (South Africa) Werner Lupberger	Nissan (AER) VQL 3.0 L V6	A	38
DNF	SRL	52	(Italy) Tampolli Engineering	(Portugal) Bernardo Sá Nogueira (Sweden) Nicke Blom	Tampolli SR2 RTA-99	P	26
DNF	SRL	52	(Italy) Tampolli Engineering	(Portugal) Bernardo Sá Nogueira (Sweden) Nicke Blom	Alfa Romeo 3.0 L V6	P	26
DNF	SRL	57	(Italy) Scuderia Giudici	(Italy) Gianni Giudici (Italy) Raffaele Raimondi	Picchio MB1	A	17
DNF	SRL	57	(Italy) Scuderia Giudici	(Italy) Gianni Giudici (Italy) Raffaele Raimondi	Alfa Romeo 3.0 L V6	A	17
DNF	SR	15	(Germany) Konrad Motorsport	(Austria) Franz Konrad (Netherlands) Tom Coronel	Lola B98/10	D	12
DNF	SR	15	(Germany) Konrad Motorsport	(Austria) Franz Konrad (Netherlands) Tom Coronel	Ford 6.0 L V8	D	12
DNF	SR	23	(Italy) BMS Scuderia Italia	(Austria) Philipp Peter (Italy) Marco Zadra	Ferrari 333 SP	P	11
DNF	SR	23	(Italy) BMS Scuderia Italia	(Austria) Philipp Peter (Italy) Marco Zadra	Ferrari F130E 4.0 L V12	P	11
DNF	SR	11	(France) Motorola DAMS	(France) Emmanuel Collard (France) Éric Bernard	Cadillac Northstar LMP	P	11
DNF	SR	11	(France) Motorola DAMS	(France) Emmanuel Collard (France) Éric Bernard	Cadillac Northstar 4.0 L Turbo V8	P	11
DNF	SRL	65	(Italy) Siliprandi	(Italy) Pasquale Barberio (Italy) Massimo Perazza	Sighinolfi 1999	A	6
DNF	SRL	65	(Italy) Siliprandi	(Italy) Pasquale Barberio (Italy) Massimo Perazza	BMW 3.0 L I6	A	6
DNF	SRL	58	(Belgium) EBRT Schroder Motorsport	(United Kingdom) Martin Henderson (Belgium) Pierre Merche	Pilbeam MP84	D	5
DNF	SRL	58	(Belgium) EBRT Schroder Motorsport	(United Kingdom) Martin Henderson (Belgium) Pierre Merche	Nissan (AER) VQL 3.0 L V6	D	5
DNS	SRL	54	(Italy) Siliprandi	(Italy) Pierguiseppe Peroni (Italy) Leonardo Maddalena	Lucchini SR2-99	A	0
DNS	SRL	54	(Italy) Siliprandi	(Italy) Pierguiseppe Peroni (Italy) Leonardo Maddalena	Alfa Romeo 3.0 L V6	A	0

== Statistics ==
- Pole Position - #15 Konrad Motorsport - 1:52.241
- Fastest Lap - #1 JMB Giesse Team Ferrari - 1:40.775

SportsRacing World Cup
Previous race: Barcelona	2000 season	Next race: Spa
