= 2000 SportsRacing World Cup Magny-Cours =

Layout of Circuit de Nevers Magny-Cours

The 2000 SportsRacing World Cup Magny-Cours was the ninth race for the 2000 SportsRacing World Cup season held at Circuit de Nevers Magny-Cours and ran a distance of two hours and thirty minutes. It took place on October 1, 2000.

The race was won by David Terrien and Christian Pescatori in the #1 JMB Giesse Team Ferrari Ferrari 333 SP, their fourth in a row, who also claimed the teams championship. The #59 BM Autosport Tampolli SR2 RTA-99, driven by Massimo Monti and Renato Nobili, won the SRL class but the #63 Redman Bright entry driven by Mark Smithson and Peter Owen, who finished second, secured both the drivers and teams championships.

== Official results ==
=== Qualifying results ===
The #1 JMB Giesse Team Ferrari Ferrari 333 SP claimed pole position with a time of 1:29.449 ahead of the #5 R&M and #8 Team Den Blå Avis entries. SRL pole position honors went the way of the #60 Lucchini Engineering, who set a time of 1:35.445. The #32 Harrier Racing Harrier LR10 did not partake in qualifying due to an engine failure and then a fire in the morning practice session.

Pole position winners in each class are marked in bold.

| Pos | Class | No | Team | Car | Time |
|---|---|---|---|---|---|
| 1 | **SR** | **1** | **(France) JMB Giesse Team Ferrari** | **Ferrari 333 SP** | **1:29.449** |
| 2 | SR | 5 | (Italy) R&M | Riley & Scott Mk III | 1:30.481 |
| 3 | SR | 8 | (Denmark) Team Den Blå Avis | Panoz LMP-1 Roadster-S | 1:30.596 |
| 4 | SR | 17 | (United Kingdom) Team Ascari | Ascari A410 | 1:30.669 |
| 5 | SR | 3 | (Monaco) GLV Brums | Ferrari 333 SP | 1:30.797 |
| 6 | SR | 23 | (Italy) BMS Scuderia Italia | Ferrari 333 SP | 1:31.357 |
| 7 | SR | 22 | (Italy) BMS Scuderia Italia | Ferrari 333 SP | 1:32.167 |
| 8 | SR | 21 | (Italy) Team Durango | GMS Durango LMP1 | 1:32.375 |
| 9 | SR | 16 | (Italy) Conrero | Riley & Scott Mk III | 1:33.993 |
| 10 | SR | 28 | (Italy) Tampolli Engineering | Ferrari 333 SP | 1:34.272 |
| 11 | SR | 26 | (Italy) Conrero | Riley & Scott Mk III | 1:34.937 |
| 12 | SR | 9 | (Denmark) Team Den Blå Avis | Panoz LMP-1 Roadster-S | 1:38.944 |
| 13 | **SRL** | **60** | **(Italy) Lucchini Engineering** | **Lucchini SR2000** | **1:35.445** |
| 14 | SRL | 59 | (Italy) BM Autosport | Tampolli SR2 RTA-99 | 1:36.788 |
| 15 | SRL | 67 | (Belgium) Schroder Motorsport | Pilbeam MP84 | 1:36.792 |
| 16 | SRL | 75 | (United Kingdom) Sovereign Racing | Rapier 6 | 1:37.380 |
| 17 | SRL | 63 | (United Kingdom) Redman Bright | Pilbeam MP84 | 1:37.442 |
| 18 | SRL | 66 | (Italy) Audisio & Benvenuto Racing | Lucchini SR2-99 | 1:38.209 |
| 19 | SRL | 72 | (Italy) SCI | Lucchini SR2000 | 1:38.406 |
| 20 | SRL | 57 | (Italy) Scuderia Giudici | Picchio MB1 | 1:39.823 |
| 21 | SRL | 99 | (France) PiR Bruneau | Debora LMP299 | 1:40.101 |
| 22 | SRL | 52 | (Italy) Tampolli Engineering | Tampolli SR2 RTA-99 | 1:40.470 |
| 23 | SRL | 54 | (Italy) Siliprandi | Lucchini SR2-99 | 1:40.768 |
| 24 | SRL | 70 | (France) Didier Bonnet Racing | Debora LMP2000 | 1:40.980 |
| 25 | SRL | 58 | (Belgium) EBRT Schroder Motorsport | Pilbeam MP84 | No time |
| 26 | SR | 32 | (United Kingdom) Harrier Racing | Harrier LR10 | No time |

=== Race results ===
Class winners in bold. Cars failing to complete 75% of winner's distance marked as Not Classified (NC).

| Pos | Class | No | Team | Drivers | Chassis | Tyre | Laps |
| Pos | Class | No | Team | Drivers | Engine | Tyre | Laps |
|---|---|---|---|---|---|---|---|
| 1 | **SR** | **1** | **(France) JMB Giesse Team Ferrari** | **(France) David Terrien** **(Italy) Christian Pescatori** | **Ferrari 333 SP** | P | **95** |
| 1 | **SR** | **1** | **(France) JMB Giesse Team Ferrari** | **(France) David Terrien** **(Italy) Christian Pescatori** | **Ferrari F130E 4.0 L V12** | P | **95** |
| 2 | SR | 3 | (Monaco) GLV Brums | (Italy) Giovanni Lavaggi (Argentina) Nicolás Filiberti | Ferrari 333 SP | G | 95 |
| 2 | SR | 3 | (Monaco) GLV Brums | (Italy) Giovanni Lavaggi (Argentina) Nicolás Filiberti | Ferrari F130E 4.0 L V12 | G | 95 |
| 3 | SR | 23 | (Italy) BMS Scuderia Italia | (Austria) Philipp Peter (Italy) Marco Zadra | Ferrari 333 SP | P | 95 |
| 3 | SR | 23 | (Italy) BMS Scuderia Italia | (Austria) Philipp Peter (Italy) Marco Zadra | Ferrari F130E 4.0 L V12 | P | 95 |
| 4 | SR | 8 | (Denmark) Team Den Blå Avis | (Denmark) John Nielsen (Denmark) Casper Elgaard | Panoz LMP-1 Roadster-S | P | 93 |
| 4 | SR | 8 | (Denmark) Team Den Blå Avis | (Denmark) John Nielsen (Denmark) Casper Elgaard | Élan 6L8 6.0 L V8 | P | 93 |
| 5 | SR | 22 | (Italy) BMS Scuderia Italia | (Switzerland) Lilian Bryner (Switzerland) Enzo Calderari (Italy) Angelo Zadra | Ferrari 333 SP | P | 91 |
| 5 | SR | 22 | (Italy) BMS Scuderia Italia | (Switzerland) Lilian Bryner (Switzerland) Enzo Calderari (Italy) Angelo Zadra | Ferrari F130E 4.0 L V12 | P | 91 |
| 6 | SR | 21 | (Italy) Team Durango | (Italy) Andrea de Lorenzi (France) Soheil Ayari | GMS Durango LMP1 | G | 90 |
| 6 | SR | 21 | (Italy) Team Durango | (Italy) Andrea de Lorenzi (France) Soheil Ayari | BMW 4.0 L V8 | G | 90 |
| 7 | **SRL** | **59** | **(Italy) BM Autosport** | **(Italy) Massimo Monti** **(Italy) Renato Nobili** | **Tampolli SR2 RTA-99** | P | **89** |
| 7 | **SRL** | **59** | **(Italy) BM Autosport** | **(Italy) Massimo Monti** **(Italy) Renato Nobili** | **Alfa Romeo 3.0 L V6** | P | **89** |
| 8 | SRL | 63 | (United Kingdom) Redman Bright | (United Kingdom) Mark Smithson (United Kingdom) Peter Owen | Pilbeam MP84 | A | 89 |
| 8 | SRL | 63 | (United Kingdom) Redman Bright | (United Kingdom) Mark Smithson (United Kingdom) Peter Owen | Nissan (AER) VQL 3.0 L V6 | A | 89 |
| 9 | SRL | 66 | (Italy) Audisio & Benvenuto Racing | (Italy) Massimo Saccomanno (Italy) Bruno Corradi | Lucchini SR2-99 | A | 88 |
| 9 | SRL | 66 | (Italy) Audisio & Benvenuto Racing | (Italy) Massimo Saccomanno (Italy) Bruno Corradi | Alfa Romeo 3.0 L V6 | A | 88 |
| 10 | SRL | 72 | (Italy) SCI | (Italy) Ranieri Randaccio (Italy) Massimo Perazza | Lucchini SR2000 | A | 87 |
| 10 | SRL | 72 | (Italy) SCI | (Italy) Ranieri Randaccio (Italy) Massimo Perazza | Alfa Romeo 3.0 L V6 | A | 87 |
| 11 | SRL | 57 | (Italy) Scuderia Giudici | (Italy) Gianni Giudici (Italy) Raffaele Raimondi | Picchio MB1 | A | 86 |
| 11 | SRL | 57 | (Italy) Scuderia Giudici | (Italy) Gianni Giudici (Italy) Raffaele Raimondi | Alfa Romeo 3.0 L V6 | A | 86 |
| 12 | SRL | 99 | (France) PiR Bruneau | (France) Marc Rostan (France) Pierre Bruneau (Italy) Ludovico Manfredi | Debora LMP299 | A | 85 |
| 12 | SRL | 99 | (France) PiR Bruneau | (France) Marc Rostan (France) Pierre Bruneau (Italy) Ludovico Manfredi | BMW 3.0 L I6 | A | 85 |
| 13 | SRL | 67 | (Belgium) Schroder Motorsport | (Portugal) Bernardo Sá Nogueira (United Kingdom) John Grant (United Kingdom) Richard Lyons | Pilbeam MP84 | D | 84 |
| 13 | SRL | 67 | (Belgium) Schroder Motorsport | (Portugal) Bernardo Sá Nogueira (United Kingdom) John Grant (United Kingdom) Richard Lyons | Nissan (AER) VQL 3.0 L V6 | D | 84 |
| 14 | SR | 5 | (Italy) R&M | (Italy) Mauro Baldi (Switzerland) Andrea Chiesa | Riley & Scott Mk III | G | 83 |
| 14 | SR | 5 | (Italy) R&M | (Italy) Mauro Baldi (Switzerland) Andrea Chiesa | Judd GV4 4.0 L V10 | G | 83 |
| 15 | SRL | 58 | (Belgium) EBRT Schroder Motorsport | (United Kingdom) Martin Henderson (United Kingdom) Owen Mildenhall | Pilbeam MP84 | D | 83 |
| 15 | SRL | 58 | (Belgium) EBRT Schroder Motorsport | (United Kingdom) Martin Henderson (United Kingdom) Owen Mildenhall | Nissan (AER) VQL 3.0 L V6 | D | 83 |
| 16 | SRL | 54 | (Italy) Siliprandi | (Italy) Pierguiseppe Peroni (Italy) Mauro Prospero | Lucchini SR2-99 | A | 82 |
| 16 | SRL | 54 | (Italy) Siliprandi | (Italy) Pierguiseppe Peroni (Italy) Mauro Prospero | Alfa Romeo 3.0 L V6 | A | 82 |
| 17 | SR | 9 | (Denmark) Team Den Blå Avis | (Denmark) Carsten Rae (Denmark) Peter Elgaard (United Kingdom) Jason Watt | Panoz LMP-1 Roadster-S | P | 81 |
| 17 | SR | 9 | (Denmark) Team Den Blå Avis | (Denmark) Carsten Rae (Denmark) Peter Elgaard (United Kingdom) Jason Watt | Élan 6L8 6.0 L V8 | P | 81 |
| DNF | SRL | 75 | (United Kingdom) Sovereign Racing | (United Kingdom) Ian Flux (United Kingdom) Mike Millard | Rapier 6 | D | 57 |
| DNF | SRL | 75 | (United Kingdom) Sovereign Racing | (United Kingdom) Ian Flux (United Kingdom) Mike Millard | Nissan (AER) VQL 3.0 L V6 | D | 57 |
| DNF | SR | 26 | (Italy) Conrero | (Italy) Beppe Gabbiani (Italy) Ettore Bonaldi (Bolivia) Filipe Ortiz | Riley & Scott Mk III | G | 46 |
| DNF | SR | 26 | (Italy) Conrero | (Italy) Beppe Gabbiani (Italy) Ettore Bonaldi (Bolivia) Filipe Ortiz | Ford 4.0 L V8 | G | 46 |
| DNF | SRL | 52 | (Italy) Tampolli Engineering | (Italy) Leonardo Maddalena (Italy) "Linos" | Tampolli SR2 RTA-99 | P | 30 |
| DNF | SRL | 52 | (Italy) Tampolli Engineering | (Italy) Leonardo Maddalena (Italy) "Linos" | Alfa Romeo 3.0 L V6 | P | 30 |
| DNF | SR | 17 | (United Kingdom) Team Ascari | (Netherlands) Klaas Zwart (South Africa) Werner Lupberger | Ascari A410 | P | 29 |
| DNF | SR | 17 | (United Kingdom) Team Ascari | (Netherlands) Klaas Zwart (South Africa) Werner Lupberger | Judd GV4 4.0 L V10 | P | 29 |
| DNF | SRL | 70 | (France) Didier Bonnet Racing | (France) Yann Goudy (France) Pascal Fabre | Debora LMP2000 | A | 21 |
| DNF | SRL | 70 | (France) Didier Bonnet Racing | (France) Yann Goudy (France) Pascal Fabre | BMW 3.0 L I6 | A | 21 |
| DNF | SR | 16 | (Italy) Conrero | (Italy) Felice Tedeschi (Italy) Alex Caffi | Riley & Scott Mk III | G | 11 |
| DNF | SR | 16 | (Italy) Conrero | (Italy) Felice Tedeschi (Italy) Alex Caffi | Ford 4.0 L V8 | G | 11 |
| DNF | SR | 28 | (Italy) Tampolli Engineering | (Italy) Gianluca Giraudi (United Kingdom) John Burton | Ferrari 333 SP | P | 6 |
| DNF | SR | 28 | (Italy) Tampolli Engineering | (Italy) Gianluca Giraudi (United Kingdom) John Burton | Ferrari F130E 4.0 L V12 | P | 6 |
| DNF | SRL | 60 | (Italy) Lucchini Engineering | (Italy) Filippo Francioni (Italy) Salvatore Ronca | Lucchini SR2000 | P | 1 |
| DNF | SRL | 60 | (Italy) Lucchini Engineering | (Italy) Filippo Francioni (Italy) Salvatore Ronca | Alfa Romeo 3.0 L V6 | P | 1 |
| DNS | SR | 32 | (United Kingdom) Harrier Racing | (United Kingdom) Ben Collins (United Kingdom) Richard Jones (United Kingdom) Dino Morelli | Harrier LR10 | G | 0 |
| DNS | SR | 32 | (United Kingdom) Harrier Racing | (United Kingdom) Ben Collins (United Kingdom) Richard Jones (United Kingdom) Dino Morelli | Porsche 3.8 L Turbo Flat-6 | G | 0 |

== Statistics ==
- Pole Position - No. 1 JMB Giesse Team Ferrari - 1:29.449
- Fastest Lap - No. 5 R&M - 1:31.046

SportsRacing World Cup
| Previous race: Nürburgring | 2000 season | Next race: Kyalami |
