= 2000 SportsRacing World Cup =

2000 Sports Racing World Cup

Seasons
- ← 1999 2001 →

The 2000 SportsRacing WORLD CUP was the second season of SportsRacing World Cup, an auto racing series organized by the International Racing Series Ltd. and officially sanctioned by the Fédération Internationale de l'Automobile. The series is a continuation of the former International Sports Racing Series which began in 1997. It was open to two categories of sports prototypes, SR and SRL, and awarded driver and team championships in each class. It began on 26 March 2000 and ended on 26 November 2000 after ten events were held in Europe, the United States of America, and South Africa.

Christian Pescatori and David Terrien won the SR drivers' championship, while their JMB Giesse Team Ferrari squad won the teams' title for the third consecutive year. For the SRL category Redman Bright and drivers Peter Owen and Mark Smithson were the respective champions.

== Schedule ==
Much of the calendar for 2000 calendar was a direct carryover of the 1999 calendar, with the notable exception of two races in the United States. As part of an agreement between Grand-Am and IRS Ltd., cars from the World Cup could participate in two Grand-Am Road Racing Championship events, while Grand-Am would include two World Cup events on their schedule. However, after the initial announcement in 1999 Grand-Am opted instead to not include the European rounds in their championship as the majority of teams were not interested. World Cup teams also withdrew their support, eventually leading to the two races only counting toward the SRL category championship. The two American races replaced the former event at Pergusa.

Races were of a duration of two hours and 30 minutes, with exception of the Monza race which covered 500 km and the American events which were 500 and 250 miles in respective distance.

Rnd	Race	Circuit	Date
1	ATP Trophy	Circuit de Catalunya, Montmeló, Spain	26 March
2	Aprimatic Trophy	Autodromo Nazionale di Monza, Monza, Italy	16 April
3	AMOC International	Circuit de Spa-Francorchamps, Stavelot, Belgium	21 May
4	Paul Revere 250 at Daytona	Daytona International Speedway, Daytona Beach, United States	29 June
5	Sargento Road America 500	Road America, Elkhart Lake, United States	9 July
6	SportsRacing World Cup Brno	Automotodrom Brno, Brno, Czech Republic	6 August
7	MG Celebration Meeting	Donington Park, Leicestershire, United Kingdom	27 August
8	SportsRacing World Cup Nürburging	Nürburgring, Nürburg, Germany	17 September
9	Grand Meeting International de Prototypes	Circuit de Nevers Magny-Cours, Magny-Cours, France	1 October
10	Vodacom Speed Festival Kyalami	Kyalami, Midrand, South Africa	26 November

== Entries ==
=== SR ===
Entrant	Car	Engine	Tyre	No.	Drivers	Rounds
(France) JMB Giesse Team Ferrari	Ferrari 333 SP	Ferrari F130E 4.0 L V12	P	1	(Italy) Christian Pescatori	1–9
(France) JMB Giesse Team Ferrari	Ferrari 333 SP	Ferrari F130E 4.0 L V12	P	1	(France) David Terrien	1–9
(Monaco) GLV Brums	Ferrari 333 SP	Ferrari F130E 4.0 L V12	G	3	(Italy) Giovanni Lavaggi	All
(Monaco) GLV Brums	Ferrari 333 SP	Ferrari F130E 4.0 L V12	G	3	(Argentina) Nicolás Filiberti	All
(Italy) R&M	Riley & Scott Mk III	Judd GV4 4.0 L V10	G	5	(Italy) Mauro Baldi	1–9
(Italy) R&M	Riley & Scott Mk III	Judd GV4 4.0 L V10	G	5	(South Africa) Gary Formato	1–8
(Italy) R&M	Riley & Scott Mk III	Judd GV4 4.0 L V10	G	5	(Switzerland) Andrea Chiesa	9
(Netherlands) Dutch National Racing Team	Ferrari 333 SP	Ferrari F130E 4.0 L V12	D G	6	(Netherlands) Alexander van der Lof	1–8
(Netherlands) Dutch National Racing Team	Ferrari 333 SP	Ferrari F130E 4.0 L V12	D G	6	(Netherlands) Dick Waaijenberg	1–8
(Denmark) Team Den Blå Avis	Panoz LMP-1 Roadster-S	Élan 6L8 6.0 L V8	P G	8	(Denmark) John Nielsen	All
(Denmark) Team Den Blå Avis	Panoz LMP-1 Roadster-S	Élan 6L8 6.0 L V8	P G	8	(Denmark) Thorkild Thyrring	1–3
(Denmark) Team Den Blå Avis	Panoz LMP-1 Roadster-S	Élan 6L8 6.0 L V8	P G	8	(Germany) Klaus Graf	6–7
(Denmark) Team Den Blå Avis	Panoz LMP-1 Roadster-S	Élan 6L8 6.0 L V8	P G	8	(Denmark) Casper Elgaard	8–10
(Denmark) Team Den Blå Avis	Panoz LMP-1 Roadster-S	Élan 6L8 6.0 L V8	P G	9	(Denmark) Carsten Rae	7–9
(Denmark) Team Den Blå Avis	Panoz LMP-1 Roadster-S	Élan 6L8 6.0 L V8	P G	9	(Denmark) Casper Elgaard	7
(Denmark) Team Den Blå Avis	Panoz LMP-1 Roadster-S	Élan 6L8 6.0 L V8	P G	9	(Denmark) Jesper Carlsen	8
(Denmark) Team Den Blå Avis	Panoz LMP-1 Roadster-S	Élan 6L8 6.0 L V8	P G	9	(United Kingdom) Jason Watt	8–9
(Denmark) Team Den Blå Avis	Panoz LMP-1 Roadster-S	Élan 6L8 6.0 L V8	P G	9	(Denmark) Peter Elgaard	9
(Germany) Kremer Racing	Lola B98/10	Ford 6.0 L V8	G	10	(Germany) Christian Gläsel	1–3
(Germany) Kremer Racing	Lola B98/10	Ford 6.0 L V8	G	10	(Germany) Ralf Kelleners	1–2, 8, 10
(Germany) Kremer Racing	Lola B98/10	Ford 6.0 L V8	G	10	(Belgium) Didier de Radigues	3
(Germany) Kremer Racing	Lola B98/10	Ford 6.0 L V8	G	10	(United Kingdom) Christian Vann	3
(Germany) Kremer Racing	Lola B98/10	Ford 6.0 L V8	G	10	(Germany) Norman Simon	8
(Germany) Kremer Racing	Lola B98/10	Ford 6.0 L V8	G	10	(South Africa) Gary Formato	10
(France) Motorola DAMS	Cadillac Northstar LMP	Cadillac Northstar 4.0 L Turbo V8	P	11	(France) Emmanuel Collard	1–3
(France) Motorola DAMS	Cadillac Northstar LMP	Cadillac Northstar 4.0 L Turbo V8	P	11	(France) Éric Bernard	1–3
(France) Motorola DAMS	Cadillac Northstar LMP	Cadillac Northstar 4.0 L Turbo V8	P	12	(France) Christophe Tinseau	1–3
(France) Motorola DAMS	Cadillac Northstar LMP	Cadillac Northstar 4.0 L Turbo V8	P	12	(Belgium) Marc Goossens	1–3
(Germany) Thomas Bscher Promotions	BMW V12 LM	BMW S70/3 6.0 L V12	Y	14	(Germany) Thomas Bscher	8
(Germany) Thomas Bscher Promotions	BMW V12 LM	BMW S70/3 6.0 L V12	Y	14	(United Kingdom) Geoff Lees	8
(Germany) Konrad Motorsport	Lola B98/10; Lola B2K/10	Ford 6.0 L V8	D	15	(Austria) Franz Konrad	2, 8
(Germany) Konrad Motorsport	Lola B98/10; Lola B2K/10	Ford 6.0 L V8	D	15	(Netherlands) Tom Coronel	2
(Germany) Konrad Motorsport	Lola B98/10; Lola B2K/10	Ford 6.0 L V8	D	15	(Germany) Sascha Maassen	8
(Germany) Konrad Motorsport	Lola B98/10; Lola B2K/10	Ford 6.0 L V8	D	15	(Germany) Jürgen von Gartzen	8
(Italy) Conrero	Riley & Scott Mk III	Ford 4.0 L V8	G	16	(Italy) Beppe Gabbiani	3, 7–8
(Italy) Conrero	Riley & Scott Mk III	Ford 4.0 L V8	G	16	(Italy) Angelo Lancelotti	3
(Italy) Conrero	Riley & Scott Mk III	Ford 4.0 L V8	G	16	(Italy) Felice Tedeschi	6–9
(Italy) Conrero	Riley & Scott Mk III	Ford 4.0 L V8	G	16	(Bolivia) Filipe Ortiz	6, 8
(Italy) Conrero	Riley & Scott Mk III	Ford 4.0 L V8	G	16	(Italy) Alex Caffi	9
(Italy) Conrero	Riley & Scott Mk III	Ford 4.0 L V8	G	26	(Italy) Beppe Gabbiani	9
(Italy) Conrero	Riley & Scott Mk III	Ford 4.0 L V8	G	26	(Bolivia) Filipe Ortiz	9
(Italy) Conrero	Riley & Scott Mk III	Ford 4.0 L V8	G	26	(Italy) Ettore Bonaldi	9
(United Kingdom) Team Ascari	Ascari A410	Judd GV4 4.0 L V10	P	17	(Netherlands) Klaas Zwart	6–9
(United Kingdom) Team Ascari	Ascari A410	Judd GV4 4.0 L V10	P	17	(South Africa) Werner Lupberger	6–9
(United Kingdom) Simpson Engineering	Matrix MXP	Nissan 3.0 L Turbo V6	A	18	(United Kingdom) Robin Smith	10
(United Kingdom) Simpson Engineering	Matrix MXP	Nissan 3.0 L Turbo V6	A	18	(United States) Dan Schryvers	10
(Italy) Team Durango	GMS Durango LMP1	BMW 4.0 L V8	G	21	(Italy) Andrea de Lorenzi	6–9
(Italy) Team Durango	GMS Durango LMP1	BMW 4.0 L V8	G	21	(France) Soheil Ayari	6, 8–10
(Italy) Team Durango	GMS Durango LMP1	BMW 4.0 L V8	G	21	(France) Jean-Philippe Belloc	7
(Italy) Team Durango	GMS Durango LMP1	BMW 4.0 L V8	G	21	(South Africa) Earl Goddard	10
(Italy) BMS Scuderia Italia	Ferrari 333 SP	Ferrari F130E 4.0 L V12	P	22	(Italy) Angelo Zadra	All
(Italy) BMS Scuderia Italia	Ferrari 333 SP	Ferrari F130E 4.0 L V12	P	22	(Switzerland) Lilian Bryner	All
(Italy) BMS Scuderia Italia	Ferrari 333 SP	Ferrari F130E 4.0 L V12	P	22	(Switzerland) Enzo Calderari	All
(Italy) BMS Scuderia Italia	Ferrari 333 SP	Ferrari F130E 4.0 L V12	P	23	(Italy) Marco Zadra	All
(Italy) BMS Scuderia Italia	Ferrari 333 SP	Ferrari F130E 4.0 L V12	P	23	(Austria) Philipp Peter	All
(United States) Doran Lista	Ferrari 333 SP	Judd GV4 4.0 L V10	Y	27	(Belgium) Didier Theys	8
(United States) Doran Lista	Ferrari 333 SP	Judd GV4 4.0 L V10	Y	27	(Switzerland) Fredy Lienhard	8
(Italy) Tampolli Engineering	Ferrari 333 SP	Ferrari F130E 4.0 L V12	P	28	(Italy) Gianluca Giraudi	1–2, 7–9
(Italy) Tampolli Engineering	Ferrari 333 SP	Ferrari F130E 4.0 L V12	P	28	(Italy) Angelo Lancelotti	1–2
(Italy) Tampolli Engineering	Ferrari 333 SP	Ferrari F130E 4.0 L V12	P	28	(United Kingdom) John Burton	7, 9
(Italy) Tampolli Engineering	Ferrari 333 SP	Ferrari F130E 4.0 L V12	P	28	(Italy) Rory Parasitili	8
(United Kingdom) Harrier Racing	Harrier LR10	Porsche 3.8 L Turbo Flat-6	G	32	(United Kingdom) Ben Collins	7, 9
(United Kingdom) Harrier Racing	Harrier LR10	Porsche 3.8 L Turbo Flat-6	G	32	(United Kingdom) Richard Jones	7, 9
(United Kingdom) Harrier Racing	Harrier LR10	Porsche 3.8 L Turbo Flat-6	G	32	(Netherlands) Michael Vergers	7
(United Kingdom) Harrier Racing	Harrier LR10	Porsche 3.8 L Turbo Flat-6	G	32	(United Kingdom) Dino Morelli	9

=== SRL ===
Entrant	Car	Engine	Tyre	No.	Drivers	Rounds
(Italy) Tampolli Engineering	Tampolli SR2 RTA-99	Alfa Romeo 3.0 L V6	P	51	(Italy) Fabian Peroni	2–3
(Italy) Tampolli Engineering	Tampolli SR2 RTA-99	Alfa Romeo 3.0 L V6	P	51	(France) Michel Ligonnet	2–3
(Italy) Tampolli Engineering	Tampolli SR2 RTA-99	Alfa Romeo 3.0 L V6	P	51	(Sweden) Niklas Loven	4–8
(Italy) Tampolli Engineering	Tampolli SR2 RTA-99	Alfa Romeo 3.0 L V6	P	51	(United States) B. J. Zacharias	4–6
(Italy) Tampolli Engineering	Tampolli SR2 RTA-99	Alfa Romeo 3.0 L V6	P	51	(South Africa) Earl Goddard	7
(Italy) Tampolli Engineering	Tampolli SR2 RTA-99	Alfa Romeo 3.0 L V6	P	51	(United Kingdom) Dino Morelli	8
(Italy) Tampolli Engineering	Tampolli SR2 RTA-99	Alfa Romeo 3.0 L V6	P	52	(Portugal) Bernardo Sá Nogueira	2–5
(Italy) Tampolli Engineering	Tampolli SR2 RTA-99	Alfa Romeo 3.0 L V6	P	52	(Sweden) Nicke Blom	2–3
(Italy) Tampolli Engineering	Tampolli SR2 RTA-99	Alfa Romeo 3.0 L V6	P	52	(Germany) Gustl Spreng	4
(Italy) Tampolli Engineering	Tampolli SR2 RTA-99	Alfa Romeo 3.0 L V6	P	52	(United States) John Hertzog	5
(Italy) Tampolli Engineering	Tampolli SR2 RTA-99	Alfa Romeo 3.0 L V6	P	52	(Czech Republic) Josef Kopecký	6
(Italy) Tampolli Engineering	Tampolli SR2 RTA-99	Alfa Romeo 3.0 L V6	P	52	(Germany) Josef Robl	6
(Italy) Tampolli Engineering	Tampolli SR2 RTA-99	Alfa Romeo 3.0 L V6	P	52	(Sweden) Niklas Loven	6
(Italy) Tampolli Engineering	Tampolli SR2 RTA-99	Alfa Romeo 3.0 L V6	P	52	(United States) B. J. Zacharias	6
(Italy) Tampolli Engineering	Tampolli SR2 RTA-99	Alfa Romeo 3.0 L V6	P	52	(United Kingdom) Richard Lyons	7
(Italy) Tampolli Engineering	Tampolli SR2 RTA-99	Alfa Romeo 3.0 L V6	P	52	(United Kingdom) Dino Morelli	7
(Italy) Tampolli Engineering	Tampolli SR2 RTA-99	Alfa Romeo 3.0 L V6	P	52	(Italy) Leonardo Maddalena	8–9
(Italy) Tampolli Engineering	Tampolli SR2 RTA-99	Alfa Romeo 3.0 L V6	P	52	(Italy) "Linos"	8–9
(Italy) GPM Racing Team	Picchio MB1	BMW 3.0 L I6	A	53	(Italy) Angelo Amadori	1–3, 6–7
(Italy) GPM Racing Team	Picchio MB1	BMW 3.0 L I6	A	53	(Italy) Mauro Prospero	1–3, 6–7
(Italy) Siliprandi	Lucchini SR2-99	Alfa Romeo 3.0 L V6	A	54	(Italy) Pierguiseppe Peroni	1–3, 6, 8–9
(Italy) Siliprandi	Lucchini SR2-99	Alfa Romeo 3.0 L V6	A	54	(Italy) Leonardo Maddalena	1–3, 6
(Italy) Siliprandi	Lucchini SR2-99	Alfa Romeo 3.0 L V6	A	54	(Italy) Mauro Prospero	8–9
(Italy) Siliprandi	Sighinolfi 1999	BMW 3.0 L I6	A	65	(Italy) Pasquale Barberio	2
(Italy) Siliprandi	Sighinolfi 1999	BMW 3.0 L I6	A	65	(Italy) Massimo Perazza	2
(Italy) Scuderia Giudici	Picchio MB1	Alfa Romeo 3.0 L V6	A	57	(Italy) Gianni Giudici	1–3, 6–9
(Italy) Scuderia Giudici	Picchio MB1	Alfa Romeo 3.0 L V6	A	57	(Italy) Raffaele Raimondi	1–3, 6–9
(Belgium) EBRT Schroder Motorsport	Pilbeam MP84	Nissan (AER) VQL 3.0 L V6	D	58	(United Kingdom) Martin Henderson	1–3, 6–9
(Belgium) EBRT Schroder Motorsport	Pilbeam MP84	Nissan (AER) VQL 3.0 L V6	D	58	(Germany) Heinrich Langfermann	1
(Belgium) EBRT Schroder Motorsport	Pilbeam MP84	Nissan (AER) VQL 3.0 L V6	D	58	(Belgium) Pierre Merche	2–3
(Belgium) EBRT Schroder Motorsport	Pilbeam MP84	Nissan (AER) VQL 3.0 L V6	D	58	(United Kingdom) Owen Mildenhall	6–9
(Belgium) Schroder Motorsport	Pilbeam MP84	Nissan (AER) VQL 3.0 L V6	D	67	(Portugal) Bernardo Sá Nogueira	7–9
(Belgium) Schroder Motorsport	Pilbeam MP84	Nissan (AER) VQL 3.0 L V6	D	67	(United Kingdom) Graham Morris	7
(Belgium) Schroder Motorsport	Pilbeam MP84	Nissan (AER) VQL 3.0 L V6	D	67	(Germany) Henrich Langfermann	7
(Belgium) Schroder Motorsport	Pilbeam MP84	Nissan (AER) VQL 3.0 L V6	D	67	(United Kingdom) "Frederico Careca"	8
(Belgium) Schroder Motorsport	Pilbeam MP84	Nissan (AER) VQL 3.0 L V6	D	67	(Belgium) Pierre Merche	8
(Belgium) Schroder Motorsport	Pilbeam MP84	Nissan (AER) VQL 3.0 L V6	D	67	(United Kingdom) John Grant	9
(Belgium) Schroder Motorsport	Pilbeam MP84	Nissan (AER) VQL 3.0 L V6	D	67	(United Kingdom) Richard Lyons	9
(Italy) BM Autosport	Tampolli SR2 RTA-99	Alfa Romeo 3.0 L V6	P	59	(Italy) Massimo Monti	1–3, 6–9
(Italy) BM Autosport	Tampolli SR2 RTA-99	Alfa Romeo 3.0 L V6	P	59	(Italy) Renato Nobili	1–3, 6–9
(Italy) Lucchini Engineering	Lucchini SR2000	Alfa Romeo 3.0 L V6	P	60	(Italy) Filippo Francioni	1–3, 6–9
(Italy) Lucchini Engineering	Lucchini SR2000	Alfa Romeo 3.0 L V6	P	60	(Italy) Salvatore Ronca	1–3, 6–9
(United Kingdom) Redman Bright	Pilbeam MP84	Nissan 3.0 L V6	A	63; 68	(United Kingdom) Mark Smithson	All
(United Kingdom) Redman Bright	Pilbeam MP84	Nissan 3.0 L V6	A	63; 68	(United Kingdom) Peter Owen	All
(United Kingdom) Redman Bright	Pilbeam MP84	Nissan 3.0 L V6	A	63; 68	(United Kingdom) Brian Redman	4
(United Kingdom) Redman Bright	Pilbeam MP84	Nissan 3.0 L V6	A	69	(South Africa) Werner Lupberger	1–3
(United Kingdom) Redman Bright	Pilbeam MP84	Nissan 3.0 L V6	A	69	(United Kingdom) Owen Mildenhall	1–3
(United Kingdom) Redman Bright	Pilbeam MP84	Nissan 3.0 L V6	A	69	(United States) Marc Bunting	4–5
(United Kingdom) Redman Bright	Pilbeam MP84	Nissan 3.0 L V6	A	69	(United States) Chuck Goldsborough	4–5
(United Kingdom) Redman Bright	Pilbeam MP84	Nissan 3.0 L V6	A	69	(Germany) Marc Lauer	5
(United Kingdom) Mark Bailey Racing	MBR 972	Rover 6R4 3.0 L V6	A	64	(United Kingdom) William Hewland	1
(United Kingdom) Mark Bailey Racing	MBR 972	Rover 6R4 3.0 L V6	A	64	(Sweden) Nicke Blom	1
(United Kingdom) Mark Bailey Racing	MBR 972	Rover 6R4 3.0 L V6	A	64	(United Kingdom) Richard Fores	3, 7
(United Kingdom) Mark Bailey Racing	MBR 972	Rover 6R4 3.0 L V6	A	64	(United Kingdom) Simon Harris	3
(United Kingdom) Mark Bailey Racing	MBR 972	Rover 6R4 3.0 L V6	A	64	(United Kingdom) Adrian Cottrell	7
(Italy) Audisio & Benvenuto Racing	Lucchini SR2-99	Alfa Romeo 3.0 L V6	A	66	(Italy) Massimo Saccomanno	1–3, 6–9
(Italy) Audisio & Benvenuto Racing	Lucchini SR2-99	Alfa Romeo 3.0 L V6	A	66	(Italy) Roberto Tonetti	1–3, 6–8
(Italy) Audisio & Benvenuto Racing	Lucchini SR2-99	Alfa Romeo 3.0 L V6	A	66	(Italy) Bruno Corradi	9
(France) Didier Bonnet Racing	Debora LMP2000	BMW 3.0 L I6	A	70	(France) Jean-François Yvon	7–8
(France) Didier Bonnet Racing	Debora LMP2000	BMW 3.0 L I6	A	70	(France) David Dussau	7
(France) Didier Bonnet Racing	Debora LMP2000	BMW 3.0 L I6	A	70	(France) Pascal Fabre	8–9
(France) Didier Bonnet Racing	Debora LMP2000	BMW 3.0 L I6	A	70	(France) Yann Goudy	9
(United Kingdom) Project 2000	Tampolli SR2 RTA-99	Alfa Romeo 3.0 L V6	A	71	(United Kingdom) "Frederico Careca"	10
(United Kingdom) Project 2000	Tampolli SR2 RTA-99	Alfa Romeo 3.0 L V6	A	71	(United Kingdom) Simon Wiseman	10
(Italy) SCI	Lucchini SR2000	Alfa Romeo 3.0 L V6	A	72	(Italy) Ranieri Randaccio	3, 6–10
(Italy) SCI	Lucchini SR2000	Alfa Romeo 3.0 L V6	A	72	(Italy) Stefano Sebastiani	3
(Italy) SCI	Lucchini SR2000	Alfa Romeo 3.0 L V6	A	72	(Italy) Massimo Perazza	6–10
(United Kingdom) Sovereign Racing	Rapier 6	Nissan (AER) VQL 3.0 L V6	D	75	(United Kingdom) Ian Flux	7, 9
(United Kingdom) Sovereign Racing	Rapier 6	Nissan (AER) VQL 3.0 L V6	D	75	(United Kingdom) Mike Millard	7, 9
SportsRacing Team Sweden	Lola B2K/40	Nissan (AER) VQL 3.0 L V6	A	76	(Sweden) Stanley Dickens	10
SportsRacing Team Sweden	Lola B2K/40	Nissan (AER) VQL 3.0 L V6	A	76	(Sweden) Fredrik Ekblom	10
(France) PiR Bruneau	Debora LMP299	BMW 3.0 L I6	A	99	(France) Pierre Bruneau	1–3, 6–9
(France) PiR Bruneau	Debora LMP299	BMW 3.0 L I6	A	99	(France) Marc Rostan	1–3, 7–9
(France) PiR Bruneau	Debora LMP299	BMW 3.0 L I6	A	99	(Czech Republic) Robert Pergl	6
(France) PiR Bruneau	Debora LMP299	BMW 3.0 L I6	A	99	(France) Dominique Lacaud	6
(France) PiR Bruneau	Debora LMP299	BMW 3.0 L I6	A	99	(United Kingdom) Piers Johnson	7
(France) PiR Bruneau	Debora LMP299	BMW 3.0 L I6	A	99	(Italy) Ludovico Manfredi	9

== Results and standings ==
=== Race results ===
For the American rounds only World Cup entries were considered for championship points, meaning the winner listed is the highest-finishing World Cup entry.

Rnd	Circuit	SR Winning Team	SRL Winning Team	Reports
Rnd	Circuit	SR Winning Drivers	SRL Winning Drivers	Reports
1	Barcelona	(France) No. 1 JMB Giesse Team Ferrari	(Belgium) No. 58 EBRT Schroder Motorsport	Report
1	Barcelona	(Italy) Christian Pescatori (France) David Terrien	(United Kingdom) Martin Henderson (Germany) Heinrich Langfermann	Report
2	Monza	(Italy) No. 5 R&M	(United Kingdom) No. 63 Redman Bright	Report
2	Monza	(Italy) Mauro Baldi (South Africa) Gary Formato	(United Kingdom) Peter Owen (United Kingdom) Mark Smithson	Report
3	Spa	(Italy) No. 22 BMS Scuderia Italia	(Italy) No. 60 Lucchini Engineering	Report
3	Spa	(Switzerland) Enzo Calderari (Switzerland) Lilian Bryner (Italy) Angelo Zadra	(Italy) Salvatore Ronca (Italy) Filippo Francioni	Report
4	Daytona	Did Not Participate	(Italy) No. 51 Tampolli Engineering	Report
4	Daytona	Did Not Participate	(United States) B. J. Zacharias (Sweden) Niklas Loven	Report
5	Road America	Did Not Participate	(Italy) No. 51 Tampolli Engineering	Report
5	Road America	Did Not Participate	(United States) B. J. Zacharias (Sweden) Niklas Loven	Report
6	Brno	(France) No. 1 JMB Giesse Team Ferrari	(Italy) No. 60 Lucchini Engineering	Report
6	Brno	(Italy) Christian Pescatori (France) David Terrien	(Italy) Salvatore Ronca (Italy) Filippo Francioni	Report
7	Donington	(France) No. 1 JMB Giesse Team Ferrari	(United Kingdom) No. 63 Redman Bright	Report
7	Donington	(Italy) Christian Pescatori (France) David Terrien	(United Kingdom) Peter Owen (United Kingdom) Mark Smithson	Report
8	Nürburgring	(France) No. 1 JMB Giesse Team Ferrari	(Italy) No. 66 Audisio & Benvenuto Racing	Report
8	Nürburgring	(Italy) Christian Pescatori (France) David Terrien	(Italy) Massimo Saccomanno (Italy) Roberto Tonetti	Report
9	Magny-Cours	(France) No. 1 JMB Giesse Team Ferrari	(Italy) No. 59 BM Autosport	Report
9	Magny-Cours	(Italy) Christian Pescatori (France) David Terrien	(Italy) Renato Nobili (Italy) Massimo Monti	Report
10	Kyalami	(Germany) No. 10 Kremer Racing	No. 76 SportsRacing Team Sweden	Report
10	Kyalami	(Germany) Ralf Kelleners (South Africa) Gary Formato	(Sweden) Stanley Dickens (Sweden) Fredrik Ekblom	Report

Points were awarded to the top eight finishers in each category. Entries were required to complete 60% of the race distance in order to be classified as a finisher and earn points. Drivers were required to complete 20% of the total race distance for their car to earn points. Teams scored points for only their highest finishing entry.

Points system
Event	1st	2nd	3rd	4th	5th	6th	7th	8th	9th	10th
Races	20	15	12	10	8	6	4	3	2	1

=== Driver championships ===
==== SR ====
Pos.	Driver	Team	BAR (Spain)	MON (Italy)	SPA (Belgium)	BRN (Czech Republic)	DON (United Kingdom)	NUR (Germany)	MAG (France)	KYA (South Africa)	Points
1	(Italy) Christian Pescatori	(France) JMB Giesse Team Ferrari	1	2	3	1	1	1	1		127
1	(France) David Terrien	(France) JMB Giesse Team Ferrari	1	2	3	1	1	1	1		127
3	(Italy) Marco Zadra	(Italy) BMS Scuderia Italia	4	Ret	Ret	4	2	2	3	2	77
3	(Austria) Philipp Peter	(Italy) BMS Scuderia Italia	4	Ret	Ret	4	2	2	3	2	77
5	(South Africa) Gary Formato	(Italy) R&M	3	1	Ret	2	Ret	Ret			67
5	(South Africa) Gary Formato	(Germany) Kremer Racing								1	67
6	(Switzerland) Enzo Calderari	(Italy) BMS Scuderia Italia	5	5	1	6	3	7	5	Ret	66
6	(Switzerland) Lilian Bryner	(Italy) BMS Scuderia Italia	5	5	1	6	3	7	5	Ret	66
6	(Italy) Angelo Zadra	(Italy) BMS Scuderia Italia	5	5	1	6	3	7	5	Ret	66
9	(Italy) Giovanni Lavaggi	(Monaco) GLV Brums	2	Ret	Ret	3	Ret	5	2	3	62
9	(Argentina) Nicolás Filiberti	(Monaco) GLV Brums	2	Ret	Ret	3	Ret	5	2	3	62
11	(Denmark) John Nielsen	(Denmark) Team Den Blå Avis	6	3	Ret	5	Ret	4	4	4	56
12	(Italy) Mauro Baldi	(Italy) R&M	3	1	Ret	2	Ret	Ret	7		51
13	(Denmark) Casper Elgaard	(Denmark) Team Den Blå Avis					5	4	4	4	38
14	(Germany) Ralf Kelleners	(Germany) Kremer Racing	10	Ret				6		1	27
15	(Denmark) Thorkild Thyrring	(Denmark) Team Den Blå Avis	6	3	Ret						18
16	(France) Soheil Ayari	(Italy) Team Durango				8		Ret	6	5	17
17	(Germany) Christian Gläsel	(Germany) Kremer Racing	10	Ret	2						16
18	(Belgium) Didier de Radrigues	(Germany) Kremer Racing			2						15
18	(United Kingdom) Christian Vann	(Germany) Kremer Racing			2						15
20	(Italy) Andrea de Lorenzi	(Italy) Team Durango				8	6	Ret	6		15
21	(France) Christophe Tinseau	(France) Motorola DAMS	7	4	Ret						14
21	(Belgium) Marc Goossens	(France) Motorola DAMS	7	4	Ret						14
23	(Italy) Gianluca Giraudi	(Italy) Tampolli Engineering	9	Ret			4	9	Ret		14
24	(Netherlands) Alexander van der Lof	(Netherlands) Dutch National Racing Team	Ret	6	Ret	7	Ret	8			13
24	(Netherlands) Dick Waaijenberg	(Netherlands) Dutch National Racing Team	Ret	6	Ret	7	Ret	8			13
26	(Germany) Sascha Maassen	(Germany) Konrad Motorsport						3			12
26	(Germany) Jürgen von Gartzen	(Germany) Konrad Motorsport						3			12
28	(Denmark) Carsten Rae	(Denmark) Team Den Blå Avis					5	10	8		12
29	(United Kingdom) John Burton	(Italy) Tampolli Engineering					4		Ret		10
30	(Germany) Klaus Graf	(Denmark) Team Den Blå Avis				5	Ret				8
30	(South Africa) Earl Goddard	(Italy) Team Durango								5	8
32	(France) Jean-Philippe Belloc	(Italy) Team Durango					6				6
32	(Germany) Norman Simon	(Germany) Kremer Racing						6			6
32	(United Kingdom) Robin Smith	(United Kingdom) Simpson Engineering								6	6
32	(United States) Dan Schryvers	(United Kingdom) Simpson Engineering								6	6
36	(Switzerland) Andrea Chiesa	(Italy) R&M							7		4
37	(France) Éric Bernard	(France) Motorola DAMS	8	Ret	Ret						3
37	(France) Emmanuel Collard	(France) Motorola DAMS	8	Ret	Ret						3
39	(United Kingdom) Jason Watt	(Denmark) Team Den Blå Avis						10	8		3
40	(Italy) Angelo Lancelotti	(Italy) Tampolli Engineering	9	Ret							2
40	(Italy) Angelo Lancelotti	(Italy) Conrero			Ret						2
40	(Italy) Felice Tedeschi	(Italy) Conrero				9	DNS	Ret	Ret		2
40	(Bolivia) Filipe Ortiz	(Italy) Conrero				9		Ret	Ret		2
40	(Italy) Rory Parasitili	(Italy) Tampolli Engineering						9			2
44	(Netherlands) Klaas Zwart	(United Kingdom) Team Ascari				10	Ret	Ret	Ret		1
44	(South Africa) Werner Lupberger	(United Kingdom) Team Ascari				10	Ret	Ret	Ret		1

Colour	Result
Gold	Winner
Silver	Second place
Bronze	Third place
Green	Points classification
Blue	Non-points classification
Blue	Non-classified finish (NC)
Purple	Retired, not classified (Ret)
Red	Did not qualify (DNQ)
Red	Did not pre-qualify (DNPQ)
Black	Disqualified (DSQ)
White	Did not start (DNS)
White	Withdrew (WD)
White	Race cancelled (C)
Blank	Did not practice (DNP)
Blank	Did not arrive (DNA)
Blank	Excluded (EX)

=== Team championships ===
Only the highest placing car within a team earned points towards the championship.

==== SR ====
Pos.	Team	BAR (Spain)	MON (Italy)	SPA (Belgium)	BRN (Czech Republic)	DON (United Kingdom)	NUR (Germany)	MAG (France)	KYA (South Africa)	Points
1	(France) JMB Giesse Team Ferrari	1	2	3	1	1	1	1		127
2	(Italy) BMS Scuderia Italia	4	2	1	4	2	2	3	2	105
3	(Denmark) Team Den Blå Avis	6	3	Ret	5	5	4	4	4	64
4	(Monaco) GLV Brums	2	Ret	Ret	3	Ret	5	2	3	62
5	(Italy) R&M	3	1	Ret	2	Ret	Ret	7		51
6	(Germany) Kremer Racing	10	Ret	2			6		1	42
7	(Italy) Team Durango				8	6	Ret	6	5	23
8	(France) Motorola DAMS	7	4	Ret						14
9	(Italy) Tampolli Engineering	9	Ret			4	9	Ret		14
10	(Netherlands) Dutch National Racing Team	Ret	6	Ret	7	Ret	8			13
11	(Germany) Konrad Motorsport		Ret				3			12
12	(United Kingdom) Simpson Engineering								6	6
13	(Italy) Conrero			Ret	9	DNS	Ret	Ret		2
14	(United Kingdom) Team Ascari				10	Ret	Ret	Ret		1

==== SRL ====
Pos	Team	BAR (Spain)	MON (Italy)	SPA (Belgium)	DAY (United States)	ROA (United States)	BRN (Czech Republic)	DON (United Kingdom)	NUR (Germany)	MAG (France)	KYA (South Africa)	Points
1	(United Kingdom) Redman Bright	4	1	4	2	2	3	1	10	2	2	133
2	(Italy) Tampolli Engineering		Ret	6	1	1	5	2	9	Ret		79
3	(Italy) Audisio & Benvenuto Racing	Ret	4	2			2	Ret	1	3		72
4	(Italy) Lucchini Engineering	Ret	2	1			1	Ret	Ret	Ret		55
5	(Belgium) EBRT Schroder Motorsport	1	Ret	5			9	4	8	7		45
6	(France) PiR Bruneau	2	Ret	3			Ret	Ret	6	6		39
7	(Italy) Siliprandi	3	Ret	Ret			6		2	8		35
8	(Italy) BM Autosport	Ret	Ret	Ret			4	Ret	Ret	1		30
9	(Italy) SCI			Ret			8	Ret	7	4	4	27
10	(Italy) Scuderia Giudici	Ret	Ret	Ret			Ret	Ret	3	5		20
10	Sports Racing Team Sweden										1	20
10	(France) Didier Bonnet Racing							3	5	Ret		20
13	(Italy) GPM Racing Team	Ret	3	Ret			7	Ret				16
14	(United Kingdom) Project 2000										3	12
15	(United Kingdom) Mark Bailey Racing	Ret		7								4
16	(United Kingdom) Sovereign Racing							Ret		Ret		0
