= 2000 SportsRacing World Cup Kyalami =

Layout of Kyalami

The 2000 SportsRacing World Cup Kyalami was the tenth and final race for the 2000 SportsRacing World Cup season held at Kyalami and ran a distance of two hours and thirty minutes. It took place on November 26, 2000.

The race was won by the No. 10 Kremer Racing entry with drivers Gary Formato and Ralf Kelleners in the Lola B98/10.

== Official results ==
Class winners in bold. Cars failing to complete 75% of winner's distance marked as Not Classified (NC).

Pos	Class	No	Team	Drivers	Chassis	Tyre	Laps
Pos	Class	No	Team	Drivers	Engine	Tyre	Laps
1	**SR**	**10**	**(Germany) Kremer Racing**	**(Germany) Ralf Kelleners** **(South Africa) Gary Formato**	**Lola B98/10**	G	**88**
1	**SR**	**10**	**(Germany) Kremer Racing**	**(Germany) Ralf Kelleners** **(South Africa) Gary Formato**	**Ford 6.0 L V8**	G	**88**
2	SR	23	(Italy) BMS Scuderia Italia	(Austria) Philipp Peter (Italy) Marco Zadra	Ferrari 333 SP	P	88
2	SR	23	(Italy) BMS Scuderia Italia	(Austria) Philipp Peter (Italy) Marco Zadra	Ferrari F130E 4.0 L V12	P	88
3	SR	3	(Monaco) GLV Brums	(Italy) Giovanni Lavaggi (Argentina) Nicolás Filiberti	Ferrari 333 SP	G	88
3	SR	3	(Monaco) GLV Brums	(Italy) Giovanni Lavaggi (Argentina) Nicolás Filiberti	Ferrari F130E 4.0 L V12	G	88
4	SR	8	(Denmark) Team Den Blå Avis	(Denmark) John Nielsen (Denmark) Casper Elgaard	Panoz LMP-1 Roadster-S	P	87
4	SR	8	(Denmark) Team Den Blå Avis	(Denmark) John Nielsen (Denmark) Casper Elgaard	Élan 6L8 6.0 L V8	P	87
5	SR	21	(Italy) Team Durango	(South Africa) Earl Goddard (France) Soheil Ayari	GMS Durango LMP1	G	87
5	SR	21	(Italy) Team Durango	(South Africa) Earl Goddard (France) Soheil Ayari	BMW 4.0 L V8	G	87
6	**SRL**	**76**	**SportsRacing Team Sweden**	**(Sweden) Stanley Dickens** **(Sweden) Fredrik Ekblom**	**Lola B2K/40**	A	**85**
6	**SRL**	**76**	**SportsRacing Team Sweden**	**(Sweden) Stanley Dickens** **(Sweden) Fredrik Ekblom**	**Nissan (AER) VQL 3.0 L V6**	A	**85**
7	SRL	63	(United Kingdom) Redman Bright	(United Kingdom) Mark Smithson (United Kingdom) Peter Owen	Pilbeam MP84	A	84
7	SRL	63	(United Kingdom) Redman Bright	(United Kingdom) Mark Smithson (United Kingdom) Peter Owen	Nissan (AER) VQL 3.0 L V6	A	84
8	SRL	71	(United Kingdom) Project 2000	(United Kingdom) "Frederico Careca" (United Kingdom) Simon Wiseman	Tampolli SR2 RTA-99	A	83
8	SRL	71	(United Kingdom) Project 2000	(United Kingdom) "Frederico Careca" (United Kingdom) Simon Wiseman	Alfa Romeo 3.0 L V6	A	83
9	SR	18	(United Kingdom) Simpson Engineering	(United Kingdom) Robin Smith (United States) Dan Schryvers	Matrix MXP	A	79
9	SR	18	(United Kingdom) Simpson Engineering	(United Kingdom) Robin Smith (United States) Dan Schryvers	Nissan 3.0 L Turbo V6	A	79
10	**V8**	**83**	**(South Africa) Botma Sport**	**(South Africa) Riaan Botma** **(South Africa) Sarel van der Merwe**	**Chevrolet Camaro**	G	**78**
10	**V8**	**83**	**(South Africa) Botma Sport**	**(South Africa) Riaan Botma** **(South Africa) Sarel van der Merwe**	**Chevrolet 5.9 L V8**	G	**78**
11	**VSP**	**91**	**(South Africa) D. Roscoe**	**(South Africa) Wotjek Pieron** **(South Africa) Donovan Roscoe**	**Shelby VSP Can-Am**	G	**76**
11	**VSP**	**91**	**(South Africa) D. Roscoe**	**(South Africa) Wotjek Pieron** **(South Africa) Donovan Roscoe**	**Nissan VQ35DE 3.5 L V8**	G	**76**
12	V8	81	(South Africa) L. Wilford Motorsport	(South Africa) Franco di Matteo (South Africa) Larry Wilford (South Africa) Terry Wilford	Ford Mustang	G	76
12	V8	81	(South Africa) L. Wilford Motorsport	(South Africa) Franco di Matteo (South Africa) Larry Wilford (South Africa) Terry Wilford	Ford 5.9 L V8	G	76
13	VSP	95	(South Africa) W. Groger	(South Africa) Wesley Grogor (South Africa) Jordan Grogor	Shelby VSP Can-Am	G	75
13	VSP	95	(South Africa) W. Groger	(South Africa) Wesley Grogor (South Africa) Jordan Grogor	Nissan VQ35DE 3.5 L V8	G	75
14	SRL	72	(Italy) SCI	(Italy) Ranieri Randaccio (Italy) Massimo Perazza	Lucchini SR2000	A	75
14	SRL	72	(Italy) SCI	(Italy) Ranieri Randaccio (Italy) Massimo Perazza	Alfa Romeo 3.0 L V6	A	75
15	VSP	94	(South Africa) R. Wood	(South Africa) Paul Keates (South Africa) Harry Roscoe (South Africa) Richard Wood	Shelby VSP Can-Am	G	75
15	VSP	94	(South Africa) R. Wood	(South Africa) Paul Keates (South Africa) Harry Roscoe (South Africa) Richard Wood	Nissan VQ35DE 3.5 L V8	G	75
16	VSP	92	(South Africa) C. Frost Racing	(South Africa) Colin Frost (South Africa) Damien Frost	Shelby VSP Can-Am	G	74
16	VSP	92	(South Africa) C. Frost Racing	(South Africa) Colin Frost (South Africa) Damien Frost	Nissan VQ35DE 3.5 L V8	G	74
17	V8	80	(South Africa) Seddon Racing	(South Africa) Francois Gerber (South Africa) Patrick Seddon	Ford Mustang	G	70
17	V8	80	(South Africa) Seddon Racing	(South Africa) Francois Gerber (South Africa) Patrick Seddon	Ford 5.9 L V8	G	70
DNF	VSP	96	(South Africa) N. Jordan	(South Africa) Mark Attieh (South Africa) Chris Coetzer (South Africa) Neville Jordan	Shelby VSP Can-Am	G	52
DNF	VSP	96	(South Africa) N. Jordan	(South Africa) Mark Attieh (South Africa) Chris Coetzer (South Africa) Neville Jordan	Nissan VQ35DE 3.5 L V8	G	52
DNF	V8	84	(South Africa) W. Hepburn Racing	(South Africa) Willie Hepburn (South Africa) Martin Van Zummeren	Chevrolet Camaro	G	38
DNF	V8	84	(South Africa) W. Hepburn Racing	(South Africa) Willie Hepburn (South Africa) Martin Van Zummeren	Chevrolet 5.9 L V8	G	38
DNF	V8	85	(South Africa) P De Waal	(South Africa) Roelf Du Plessis (South Africa) Pierre de Waal	Chevrolet Camaro	G	34
DNF	V8	85	(South Africa) P De Waal	(South Africa) Roelf Du Plessis (South Africa) Pierre de Waal	Chevrolet 5.9 L V8	G	34
DNF	VSP	93	(South Africa) DK Woodcraft Office Furniture	(South Africa) Clive Kennerley (South Africa) James Kennerley (South Africa) Neil Lobb	Shelby VSP Can-Am	G	34
DNF	VSP	93	(South Africa) DK Woodcraft Office Furniture	(South Africa) Clive Kennerley (South Africa) James Kennerley (South Africa) Neil Lobb	Nissan VQ35DE 3.5 L V8	G	34
DNF	V8	82	(South Africa) Van Blerk Racing	(South Africa) Derek van Blerk (South Africa) Hennie Groenewald	Ford Mustang	G	33
DNF	V8	82	(South Africa) Van Blerk Racing	(South Africa) Derek van Blerk (South Africa) Hennie Groenewald	Ford 5.9 L V8	G	33
DNF	VSP	97	(South Africa) M. Fergusson	(South Africa) Michael Fergusson (South Africa) Bernard Tilanus	Shelby VSP Can-Am	G	15
DNF	VSP	97	(South Africa) M. Fergusson	(South Africa) Michael Fergusson (South Africa) Bernard Tilanus	Nissan VQ35DE 3.5 L V8	G	15
DNF	SR	22	(Italy) BMS Scuderia Italia	(Switzerland) Lilian Bryner (Switzerland) Enzo Calderari (Italy) Angelo Zadra	Ferrari 333 SP	P	12
DNF	SR	22	(Italy) BMS Scuderia Italia	(Switzerland) Lilian Bryner (Switzerland) Enzo Calderari (Italy) Angelo Zadra	Ferrari F130E 4.0 L V12	P	12
DNF	VSP	90	(South Africa) Alan Eve	(South Africa) Alan Eve (South Africa) George Ferreira	Shelby VSP Can-Am	G	8
DNF	VSP	90	(South Africa) Alan Eve	(South Africa) Alan Eve (South Africa) George Ferreira	Nissan VQ35DE 3.5 L V8	G	8

== Statistics ==
- Pole Position - No. 3 GLV Brums - 1:36.126
- Fastest Lap - No. 10 Kremer Racing - 1:37.049

SportsRacing World Cup
Previous race: Magny-Cours	2000 season	Next race: none
