= 4 Hours of Barcelona =

Sports car endurance race in Spain

(Spain) 4 Hours of Barcelona

European Le Mans Series
- Venue: Circuit de Catalunya
- First race: 1954
- First ELMS race: 2019
- Last race: 2026
- Duration: 4 Hours
- Previous names: Coppa Montjuich; Trofeo Nuvolari; Trofeo Juan Jover
- Most wins (driver): (Spain) Francisco Godia Sales (4)
- Most wins (team): (Italy) JMB Racing (2)
- Most wins (manufacturer): Oreca (6)

The 4 Hours of Barcelona (formerly the Coppa Montjuich) is a sports car race held at the Circuit de Catalunya in Montmeló, Catalunya, Spain. The race began as a non-championship event at the Montjuïc circuit in 1954.

== Results ==
Year	Overall winner(s)	Entrant	Car	Distance/Duration	Race title	Championship	Report
Montjuïc
1954	(Spain) Joaquin Palacio Pover		Pegaso Spyder	1 hour	Coppa Montjuich	Non-championship	report
1955	(Switzerland) Willie Daetwyler		Ferrari 750 Monza	1 hour	Coppa Montjuich	Non-championship	report
1956: Not held
1957	(Spain) Gerardo de Andres		Mercedes-Benz 300 SL	76 km (47 mi)	Trofeo Nuvolari	Non-championship	report
1958	(Spain) Alex Soler-Roig		Porsche 356 Carrera	76 km (47 mi)	Trofeo Nuvolari	Non-championship	report
1959	(Spain) Alex Soler-Roig		Porsche RS	38 km (24 mi)	Trofeo Nuvolari	Non-championship	report
1960–1961: Not held
1962	(Spain) Francisco Godia Sales		Aston Martin DB4	45 km (28 mi)	Trofeo Nuvolari	Non-championship	report
1963	(Spain) Alex Soler-Roig		Porsche 356 Carrera	57 km (35 mi)	Trofeo Juan Jover	Non-championship	report
1964	(Switzerland) Charles Vögele		Lotus 19-Climax	114 km (71 mi)	Trofeo Juan Jover	Non-championship	report
1965	(Spain) Francisco Godia Sales		A.C. Cobra-Ford	76 km (47 mi)	Trofeo Juan Jover	Non-championship	report
1966	(Spain) Juan Fernández		Porsche 906	95 km (59 mi)	Trofeo Juan Pinol	Non-championship	report
1967–1971: Not held
1972	(United Kingdom) John Burton	(Netherlands) Canon Racing Team	Chevron B21-Ford	400 km (250 mi)	400 km de Barcelona	European 2-Litre Championship	report
1973	(France) Gérard Larrousse	(Switzerland) Archambeaud Racing	Lola T292-BMW	400 km (250 mi)	400 km de Barcelona	European 2-Litre Championship	report
1974–1998: Not held
Circuit de Catalunya
1999	(France) Emmanuel Collard (Italy) Vincenzo Sospiri	(Italy) JB Giesse Team Ferrari	Ferrari 333 SP	2 hours, 30 minutes	ATP ISRS Trophy Barcelona	Sports Racing World Cup	report
2000	(Italy) Christian Pescatori (France) David Terrien	(Italy) JMB Giesse Team Ferrari	Ferrari 333 SP	2 hours, 30 minutes	ATP Trophy	Sports Racing World Cup	report
2001	(Italy) Christian Pescatori (Italy) Marco Zadra	(Italy) BMS Scuderia Italia	Ferrari 333 SP	2 hours, 30 minutes	Barcelona 2 hours, 30 minutes	FIA Sportscar Championship	report
2002	(France) Sébastien Bourdais (France) Jean-Christophe Boullion	(France) Pescarolo Sport	Courage C60-Peugeot	2 hours, 30 minutes	Barcelona 2 hours, 30 minutes	FIA Sportscar Championship	report
2003–2018: Not held
2019	(Russia) Roman Rusinov (Netherlands) Job van Uitert (France) Jean-Éric Vergne	(Russia) G-Drive Racing	Aurus 01	4 hours	4 Hours of Barcelona	European Le Mans Series	report
2020: Cancelled due to the COVID-19 pandemic
2021	(Switzerland) Louis Delétraz (Poland) Robert Kubica (China) Yifei Ye	(Belgium) Team WRT	Oreca 07	4 hours	4 Hours of Barcelona	European Le Mans Series	report
2022	(United Kingdom) Tom Gamble (United Kingdom) Philip Hanson (United Kingdom) Duncan Tappy	(United Kingdom) United Autosports	Oreca 07	4 hours	4 Hours of Barcelona	European Le Mans Series	report
2023	(Turkey) Salih Yoluç (Republic of Ireland) Charlie Eastwood (Switzerland) Louis Delétraz	Racing Team Turkey	Oreca 07	4 hours	4 Hours of Barcelona	European Le Mans Series	report
2024	(Spain) Lorenzo Fluxá (Denmark) Malthe Jakobsen (Japan) Ritomo Miyata	(Switzerland) Cool Racing	Oreca 07	4 hours	4 Hours of Barcelona	European Le Mans Series	report
2025	(United Kingdom) Jamie Chadwick (France) Mathys Jaubert (Spain) Daniel Juncadella	(France) IDEC Sport	Oreca 07	4 hours	4 Hours of Barcelona	European Le Mans Series	report
2026	(United Kingdom) Oliver Gray (France) Esteban Masson (France) Louis Rousset	(France) Forestier Racing by Panis	Oreca 07	4 hours	4 Hours of Barcelona	European Le Mans Series	report
