= Gary Formato =

South African racing driver (born 1974)

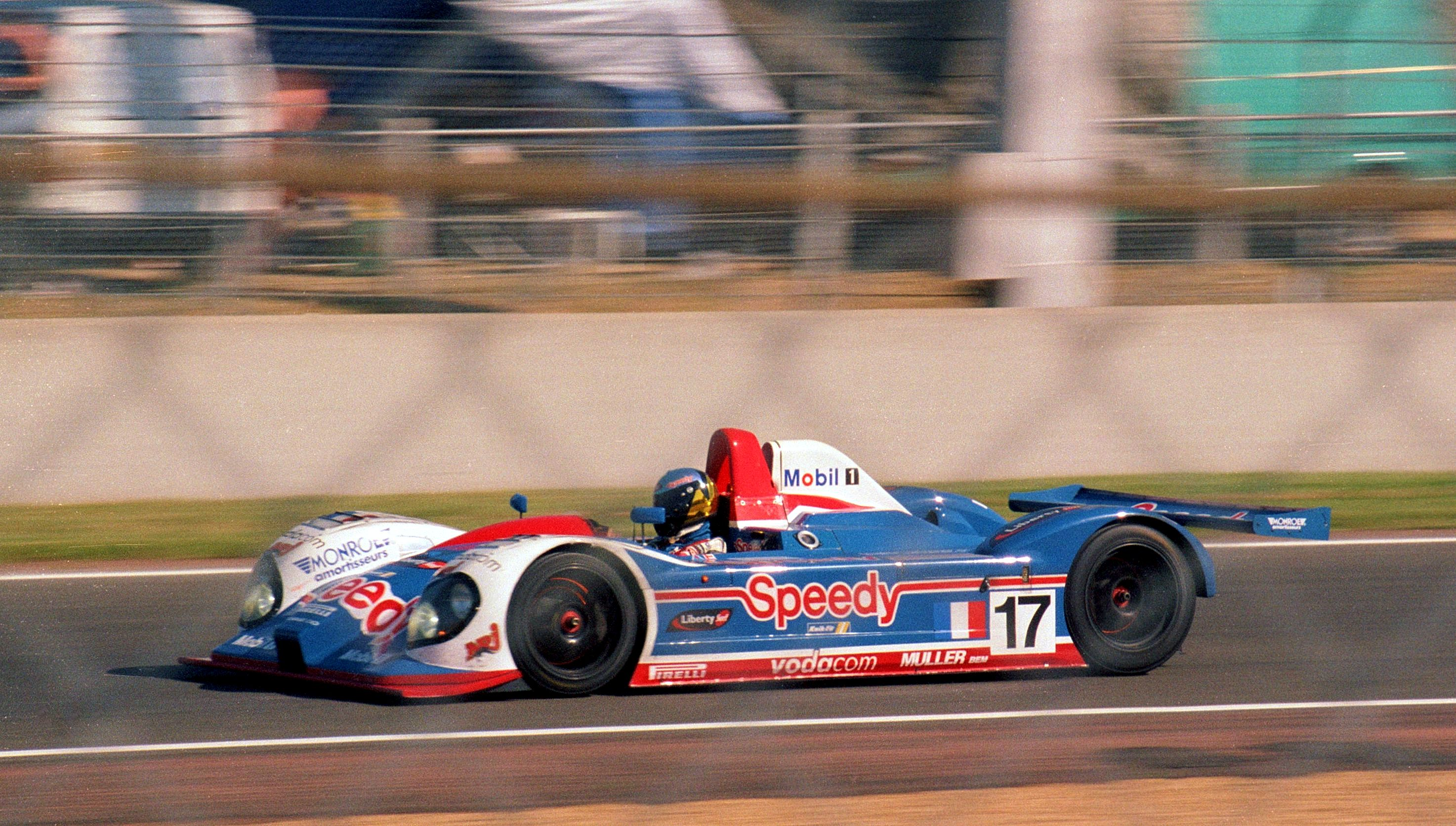
The Courage C60 that Gary Formato drove during the 2000 24 Hours of Le Mans alongside Philipe Gache and Didier Cottaz.

Gary Formato (born 19 November 1974) is a South African former racing driver and current director and co-founder of the Sasol GTC Championship, alongside Vic Maharaj.

Formato is most notable for his four wins in the FIA Sportscar Championship and European Le Mans Series between 1998 and 2001. He also competed in the 1995 International Formula 3000 Championship for the Durango team, starting all eight races but scoring no points. Formato also started the 24 Hours of Le Mans three times between 1999 and 2001 but did not finish a race.

== Sportscar career ==
=== 1998 ===
Formato drove the No. 19 Solution F Riley & Scott MKIII, getting a third place during the first round in Barcelona behind two Ferrari 333 SPs and a win during the season finale in Kyalami, where he and teammate Jerome Policand beat the No. 61 Dyson Racing of James Weaver and Butch Leitzinger in second place, and the No. 60 Risi Competitzione of Eric van de Poele and Wayne Taylor in third.

== Racing record ==
=== Complete International Formula 3000 results ===
(key) (Races in bold indicate pole position; races in italics indicate fastest lap.)

Year	Entrant	Chassis	Engine	1	2	3	4	5	6	7	8	Pos.	Pts
1995	Nordic Racing	Lola T95/50	Cosworth AC	SIL; 14	CAT; 14	PAU; Ret	PER; 9	HOC; Ret	SPA; Ret	EST; 12	MAG; 13	21st	0

=== Complete 24 Hours of Le Mans results ===
Year	Team	Co-Drivers	Car	Class	Laps	Pos.	Class Pos.
1999	(France) Riley & Scott Europe	(France) Philippe Gache (France) Olivier Thévenin	Riley & Scott MKIII-Ford	LMP	24	**DNF**	**DNF**
2000	(France) SMG Compétition	(France) Didier Cottaz (France) Philippe Gache	Courage C60-Judd	LMP900	219	**DNF**	**DNF**
2001	(United States) Panoz Motor Sports	(United Kingdom) Jamie Davies (Germany) Klaus Graf	Panoz LMP07-Élan	LMP900	86	**DNF**	**DNF**
