= Massimo Monti =

Italian racing driver (born 1962)

Massimo Monti (born 26 March 1962 in Bologna) is an Italian racing driver who competed from 1985 to 2014.
