= Marco Zadra =

Italian racing driver (born 1978)

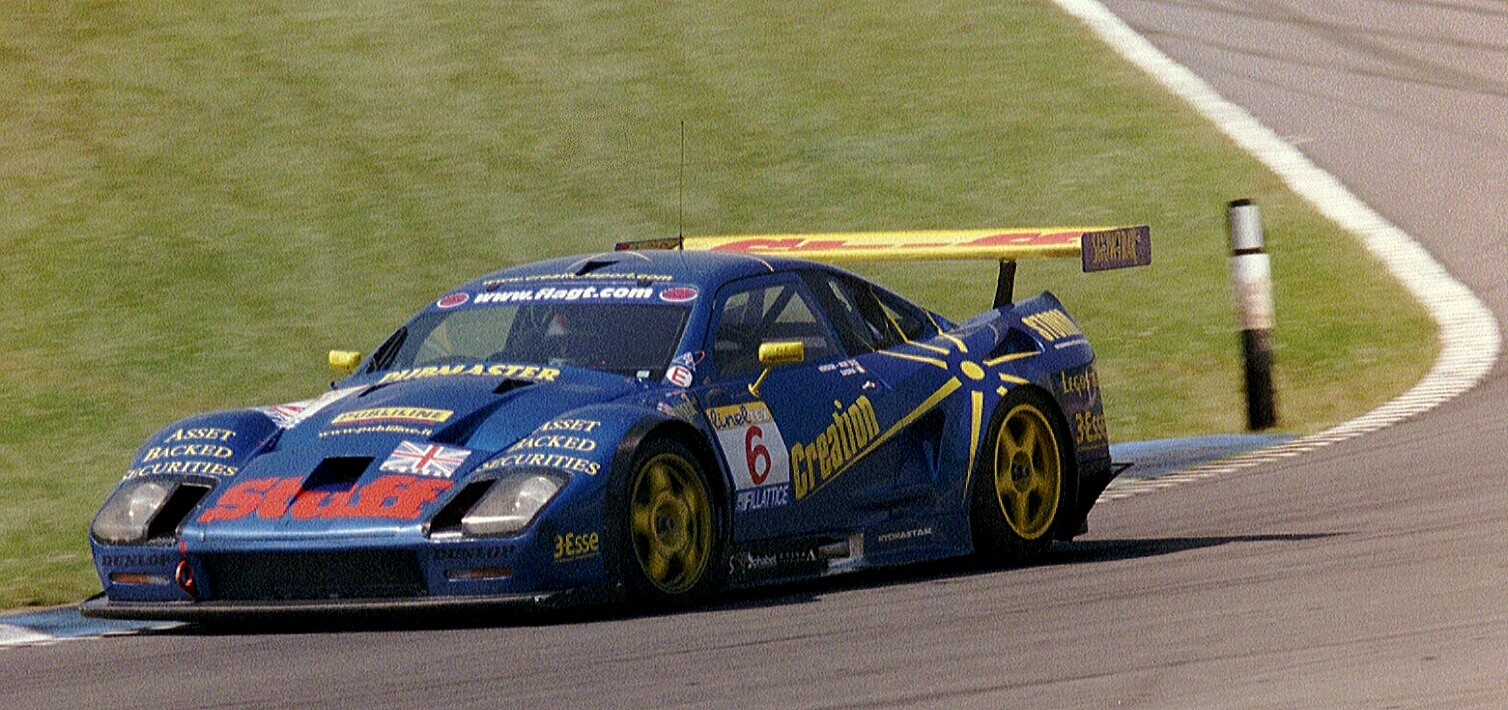
- Zadra in 2003
- Nationality: (Italy) Italian
- Born: 27 January 1978 (age 48) Milan, Lombardy, Italy
- Relatives: Angelo Zadra (father)

Previous series
- 2002–03 1998–01 1997: FIA GT Championship; FIA Sportscar Championship; Italian GT

Championship titles
- 2001: FIA Sportscar Championship – SR1

Marco Zadra (born 27 January 1978 in Milan) is an Italian former racing driver. He raced a Ferrari 333 SP for BMS Scuderia Italia between 1999 and 2002, first partnering his father Angelo Zadra and later winning the FIA Sportscar Championship in 2001 alongside Christian Pescatori and Jean-Marc Gounon. He last competed in 2003, driving a Lister Storm for Creation Autosportif in the FIA GT Championship, with an overall podium at Oschersleben.

== Racing record ==
=== Career summary ===
Season	Series	Team	Races	Wins	Poles	F/Laps	Podiums	Points	Position
1997	Challenge Endurance Italia	Zadra Marco	1	0	0	0	0	?	?
1997	Challenge Endurance Italia	Sakamoto	1	0	0	0	0	?	?
1997	Challenge Endurance Italia	Mirabella Mille Miglia	1	0	0	0	1	?	?
1997	6 Hours of Vallelunga - FIA GT2	Mirabella Mille Miglia	1	1	1	0	1	N/A	**1st**
1997	Spa 24 Hours - Spa +3.0	Düller Motorsport	1	0	0	0	0	N/A	DNF
1997	Italian GT Championship		3	3	?	?	3	?	?
1998	International Sports Racing Series - CN	Cipriani Motorsport	1	0	0	0	0	18	12th
1998	International Sports Racing Series - CN	Centenari Racing SRL	3	0	0	0	0	18	12th
1999	SportsRacing World Cup - SR1	BMS Scuderia Italia	8	0	0	0	2	48	12th
2000	SportsRacing World Cup - SR	BMS Scuderia Italia	8	0	0	0	4	77	**3rd**
2000	Grand-American Road Racing Championship - SR	Autosport Racing	1	0	0	0	0	28	66th
2001	FIA Sportscar Championship - SR1	BMS Scuderia Italia	8	2	0	0	6	110	**1st**
2002	FIA GT Championship - GT	BMS Scuderia Italia	1	0	0	0	0	0	NC
2003	FIA GT Championship - GT	Creation Autosportif	8	0	0	0	1	24	9th
2003	FIA GT Championship - N-GT	Cirtek Motorsport	1	0	0	0	0	1	47th

=== Complete FIA Sportscar Championship results ===
(key) (Races in bold indicate pole position) (Races in italics indicate fastest lap)

Year	Team	Car	Class	1	2	3	4	5	6	7	8	9	Pos.	Points
1998	Cipriani Motorsport	Lucchini P3-96	CN	LEC	BRN	MIS; 4	DON						12th	18
1998	Centenari Racing SRL	Centenari M1	CN					AND; Ret	NÜR; 5	LMS; Ret	KYA		12th	18
1999	BMS Scuderia Italia	Ferrari 333 SP	SR1	CAT; 6	MNZ; Ret	SPA; 5	PER; 4	DON; 6	BRN; 3	NÜR; 6	MAG; Ret	KYA; 2	12th	48
2000	BMS Scuderia Italia	Ferrari 333 SP	SR	CAT; 4	MNZ; Ret	SPA; Ret	BRN; 4	DON; 2	NÜR; 2	MAG; 3	KYA; 2		3rd	77
2001	BMS Scuderia Italia	Ferrari 333 SP	SR1	**CAT**; 1	MNZ; Ret	SPA; 1	**BRN**; 2	MAG; 2	DON; 2	MON; 2	NÜR; 4		1st	110

=== Complete FIA GT Championship results ===
(key) (Races in bold indicate pole position) (Races in italics indicate fastest lap)

Year	Team	Car	Class	1	2	3	4	5	6	7	8	9	10	Pos.	Points
2002	BMS Scuderia Italia	Ferrari 550-GTS Maranello	GT	MAG	SIL	BRN	JAR	AND	OSC	**SPA**; DSQ	PER	DON	EST	NC	0
2003	Cirtek Motorsport	Porsche 911 GT3-R	N-GT	CAT; 8										47th	1
2003	Creation Autosportif	Lister Storm GTM	GT		MAG; 7	PER; 4	BRN; 6	DON; 5	SPA; Ret	AND; 7	OSC; 2	EST; Ret	MNZ; 8	9th	24
