= Christian Pescatori =

Italian racing driver

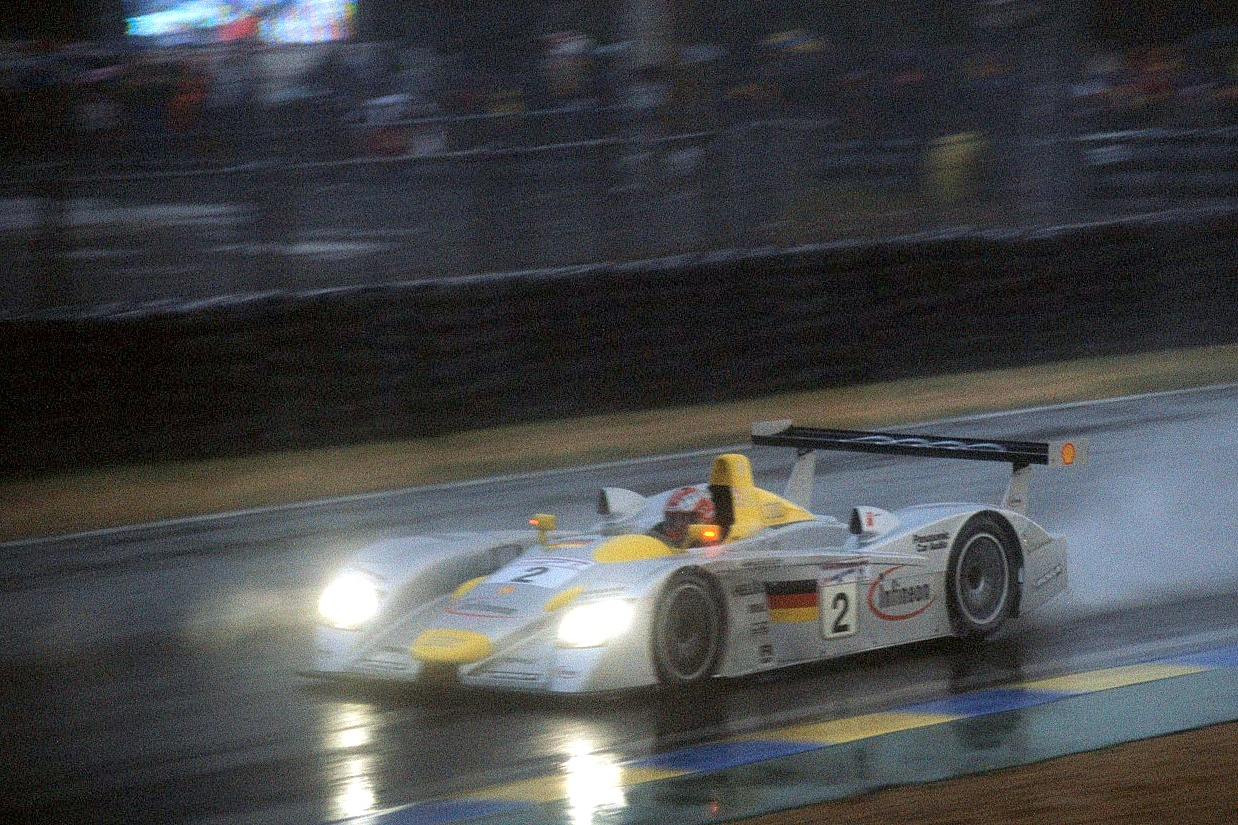
- Pescatori racing for Audi in 2001
- Nationality: (Italy) Italian
- Born: 1 December 1971 (age 54) Brescia, Italy
- Categorisation: FIA Platinum (until 2014); FIA Gold (2015–2021); FIA Silver (2022–)

Christian Pescatori (born 1 December 1971 in Brescia) is a professional racecar driver from Italy.

Pescatori started his career in single-seater racing, becoming Italian Formula 3 Champion in 1993, before moving up to Formula 3000.

Pescatori later moved on to sports car racing, where he had more success. Pescatori won the Sports Racing World Cup in 2000, and the FIA GT Championship's N-GT class in 2001, both for JMB Racing. In 2002, he became an Audi works driver, winning the 12 Hours of Sebring. In 2001 and 2002, he was also second overall in the 24 Hours of Le Mans. In 2005, he was GTS Champion in the Le Mans Endurance Series.

Pescatori is currently team manager of Italian GT team Nova Race, having previously held a similar role at Villorba Corse.

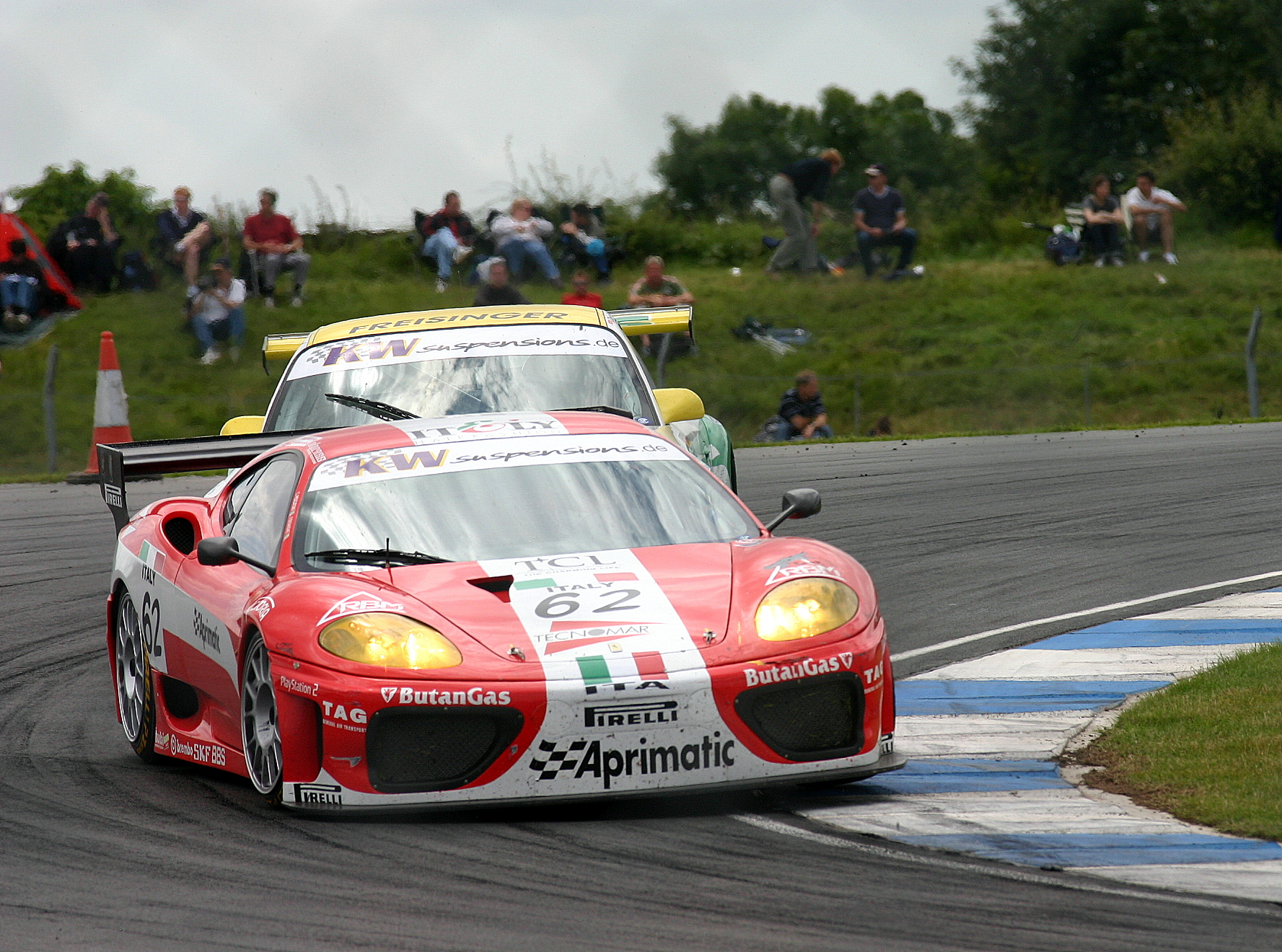
Pescatori spent much of his FIA GT career at Ferrari (pictured in 2004).

== 24 Hours of Le Mans results ==
| Year | Team | Co-Drivers | Car | Class | Laps | Pos. | Class Pos. |
|---|---|---|---|---|---|---|---|
| 1997 | (Italy) BMS Scuderia Italia | (Italy) Pierluigi Martini (Brazil) Antônio Hermann de Azevedo | Porsche 911 GT1 | GT1 | 317 | 8th | 4th |
| 1999 | (France) JB Racing | (France) Jérôme Policand (Italy) Mauro Baldi | Ferrari 333 SP | LMP | 71 | DNF | DNF |
| 2001 | (Germany) Audi Sport North America | (France) Laurent Aïello (Italy) Rinaldo Capello | Audi R8 | LMP900 | 320 | 2nd | 2nd |
| 2002 | (Germany) Audi Sport North America | (United Kingdom) Johnny Herbert (Italy) Rinaldo Capello | Audi R8 | LMP900 | 374 | 2nd | 2nd |
| 2005 | (Italy) BMS Scuderia Italia | (Italy) Fabrizio Gollin (Portugal) Miguel Ramos | Ferrari 550-GTS Maranello | GT1 | 67 | DNF | DNF |
| 2006 | (Italy) BMS Scuderia Italia | (Italy) Fabrizio Gollin (Italy) Fabio Babini | Aston Martin DBR9 | GT1 | 3 | DNF | DNF |

Sporting positions
| Preceded by Max Angelelli | Italian Formula Three Champion; 1993 | Succeeded by Giancarlo Fisichella |
| Preceded by Emmanuel Collard; Vincenzo Sospiri | FIA Sportscar Championship Champion; 2000 with: David Terrien | Succeeded by Marco Zadra |
