= Enzo Calderari =

Swiss racecar driver

Enzo Calderari (born 18 April 1952, Bienne, Switzerland) is a Swiss entrepreneur and former car racing driver.

== Career ==
Enzo Calderari is the son of Jacques Calderari, who was active as a sports car driver in the 1960s. The son, a real estate agent in his day job, can look back on a racing career spanning almost 30 years. He began GT and touring car racing in the 1970s and, together with Marco Vanoli, finished sixth overall in the 1980 European Touring Car Championship (overall winner Helmut Kelleners and Siegfried Müller junior). In addition to further appearances in the European Touring Car Championship, he competed in the German Racing Championship and the World Sportscar Championship.

In 1992, Calderari secured the overall championship of the 1992 Porsche Carrera Trophy ahead of Stefan Oberndorfer and was runner-up in the Porsche Supercup in 1993 behind Altfrid Heger. Enzo Calderari won the Porsche Cup, an annual award presented by Porsche AG to recognize the world's most successful privateer racing driver competing with Porsche machinery in a customer racing team, in 1995 together with his teammate Lilian Bryner.

He celebrated further successes in the FIA GT Championship, where he finished fifth overall in the 2004 championship in a Ferrari 550 Maranello entered by BMS Scuderia Italia. That year he also celebrated overall victory in the Spa-Francorchamps 24 Hours.

Calderari competed five times in the 24 Hours of Le Mans. He made his debut in 1985 and his best finish in the final classification was in 1994 with his then regular co-driver Lilian Bryner and the Italian Renato Mastropietro, when he finished ninth overall. He had his last active season in 2009 in the Italian Touring Car Championship, then retired from active racing.
