= Ferrari 412T =

Ferrari 412T refers to two Formula One cars developed by Ferrari:

- Ferrari 412 T1 refers to the car used by Scuderia Ferrari in the 1994 Formula One season.
- Ferrari 412 T2 refers to the car used by Scuderia Ferrari in the 1995 Formula One season.
