= Ferrari V12 F1 engine =

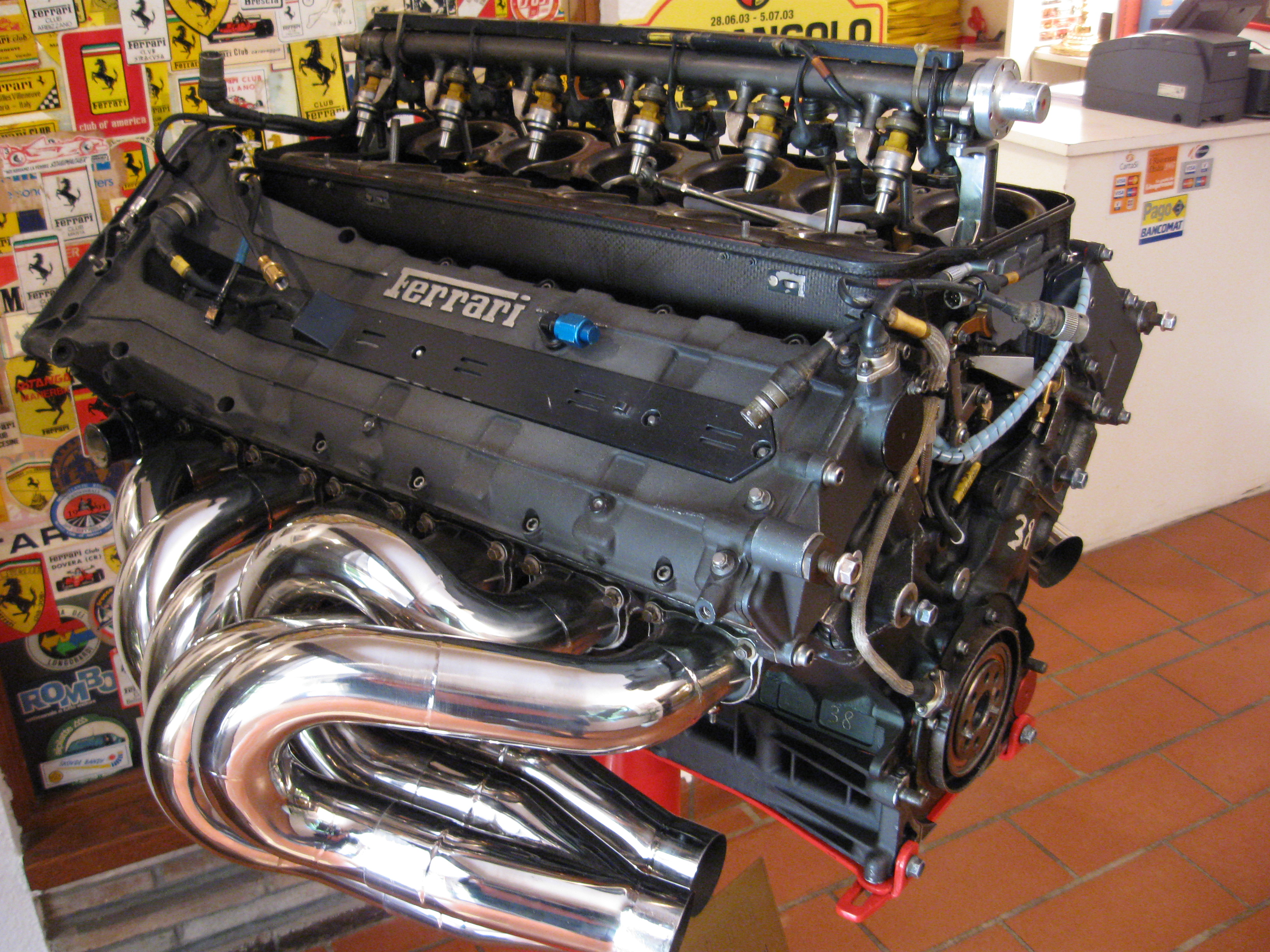
- 1995 F1

Overview
- Manufacturer: (Italy) Ferrari
- Designer: Gioacchino Colombo (1950); Aurelio Lampredi (1950–1951); Mauro Forghieri (1964–1980); Claudio Lombardi (1989–1995); Osamu Goto (1994–1995)
- Production: 1950–1951, 1964–1980, 1989–1995

Layout
- Configuration: 60° V12/flat-12 (1966–1980); 65°–75° V12 (1989–1995)
- Displacement: 3.0–3.5 L (183–214 cu in)
- Cylinder bore: 77 mm (3.0 in) (3.0L); 78.5 mm (3.09 in) (3.0L); 80 mm (3.1 in) (3.0L); 84 mm (3.3 in) (3.5L); 86 mm (3.4 in) (3.5L/3.0L); 88 mm (3.5 in) (3.5L); 90 mm (3.5 in) (3.5L)
- Piston stroke: 53.5 mm (2.11 in) (3.0L); 51.5 mm (2.03 in) (3.0L); 49.6 mm (1.95 in) (3.0L); 52.6 mm (2.07 in) (3.5L); 50.2 mm (1.98 in) (3.5L); 47.9 mm (1.89 in) (3.5L); 45.8 mm (1.80 in) (3.5L); 43 mm (1.7 in) (3.0L)
- Valvetrain: 24-valve to 60-valve, SOHC/DOHC, two-valves per cylinder to five-valves per cylinder
- Compression ratio: 9.5:1 – 13.3:1

Combustion
- Supercharger: Yes (1950–1951); Naturally aspirated (1964–1995)
- Fuel system: Carburetor/Indirect fuel injection
- Fuel type: Gasoline
- Oil system: Dry sump

Output
- Power output: 220–860 hp (164–641 kW)
- Torque output: 160–370 lb⋅ft (217–502 N⋅m)

Dimensions
- Dry weight: 120–160 kg (265–353 lb)

Chronology
- Predecessor: Ferrari turbocharged V6 F1
- Successor: Ferrari V10 F1

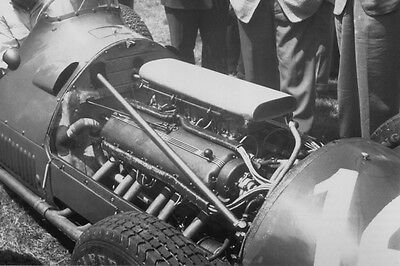
1951 375 Lampredi engine; as used in the Ferrari 375 F1.

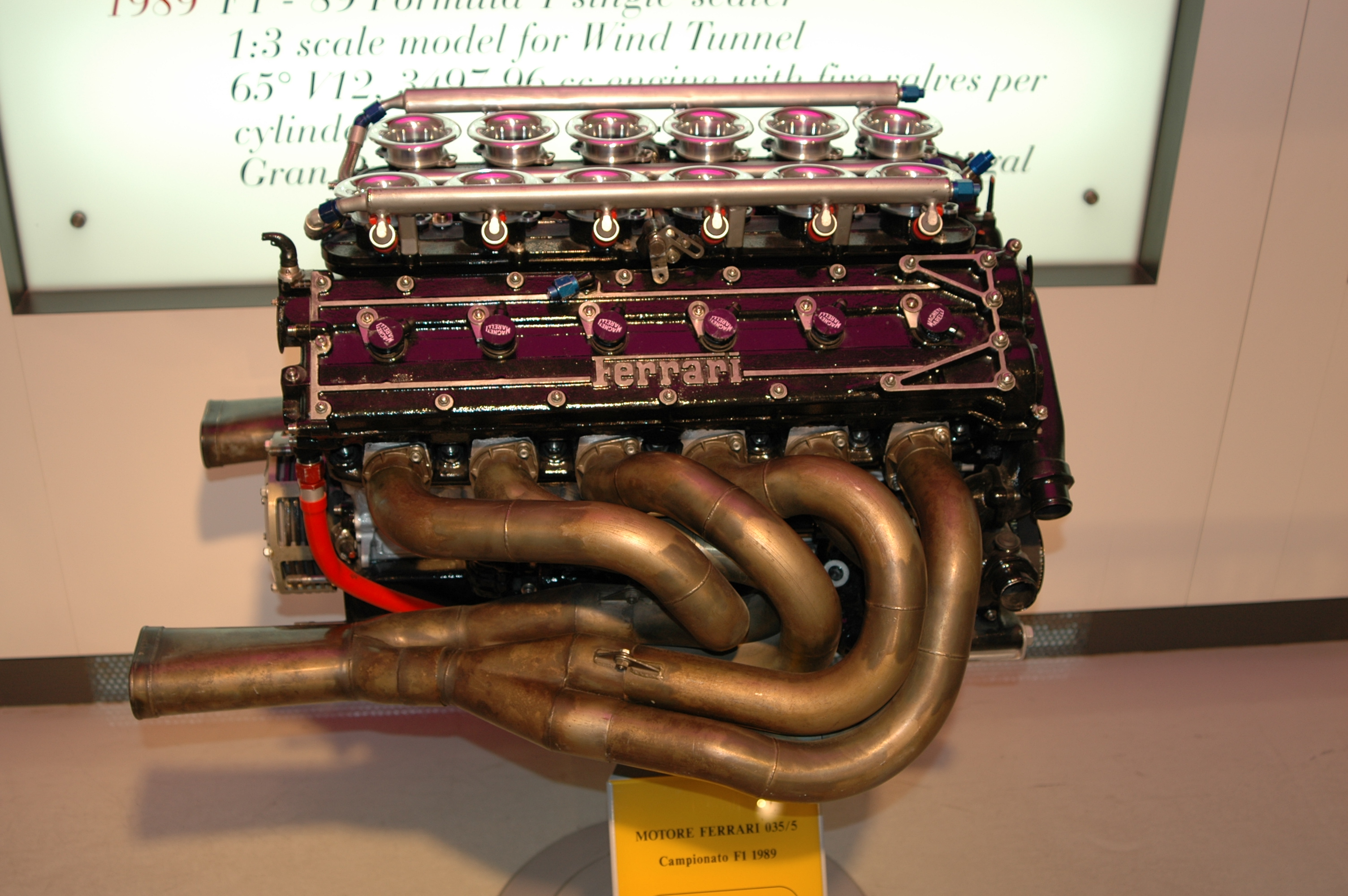
1989 Ferrari 035-5 engine side Museo Ferrari.

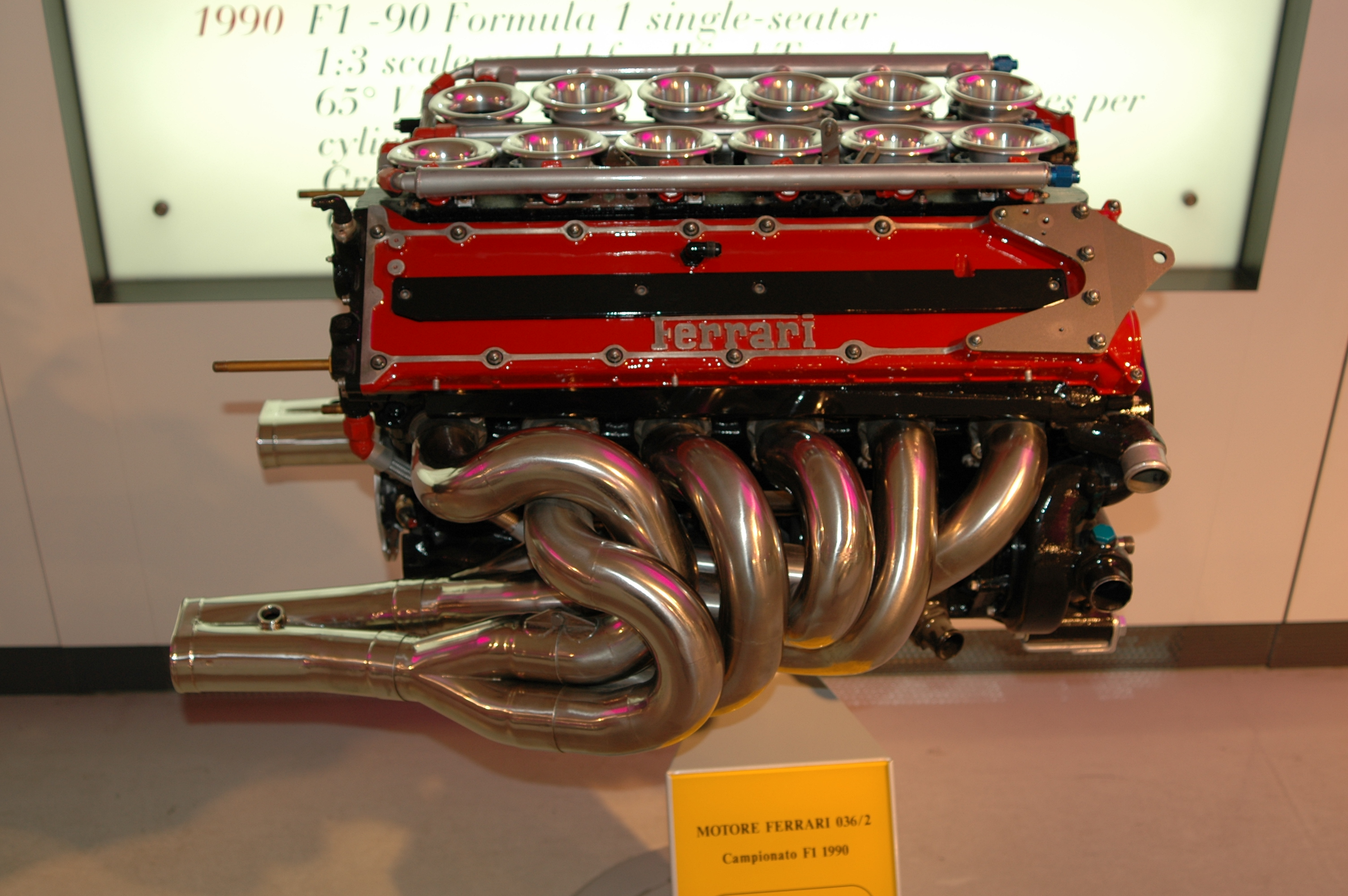
1990 Ferrari 036-2 engine side Museo Ferrari.

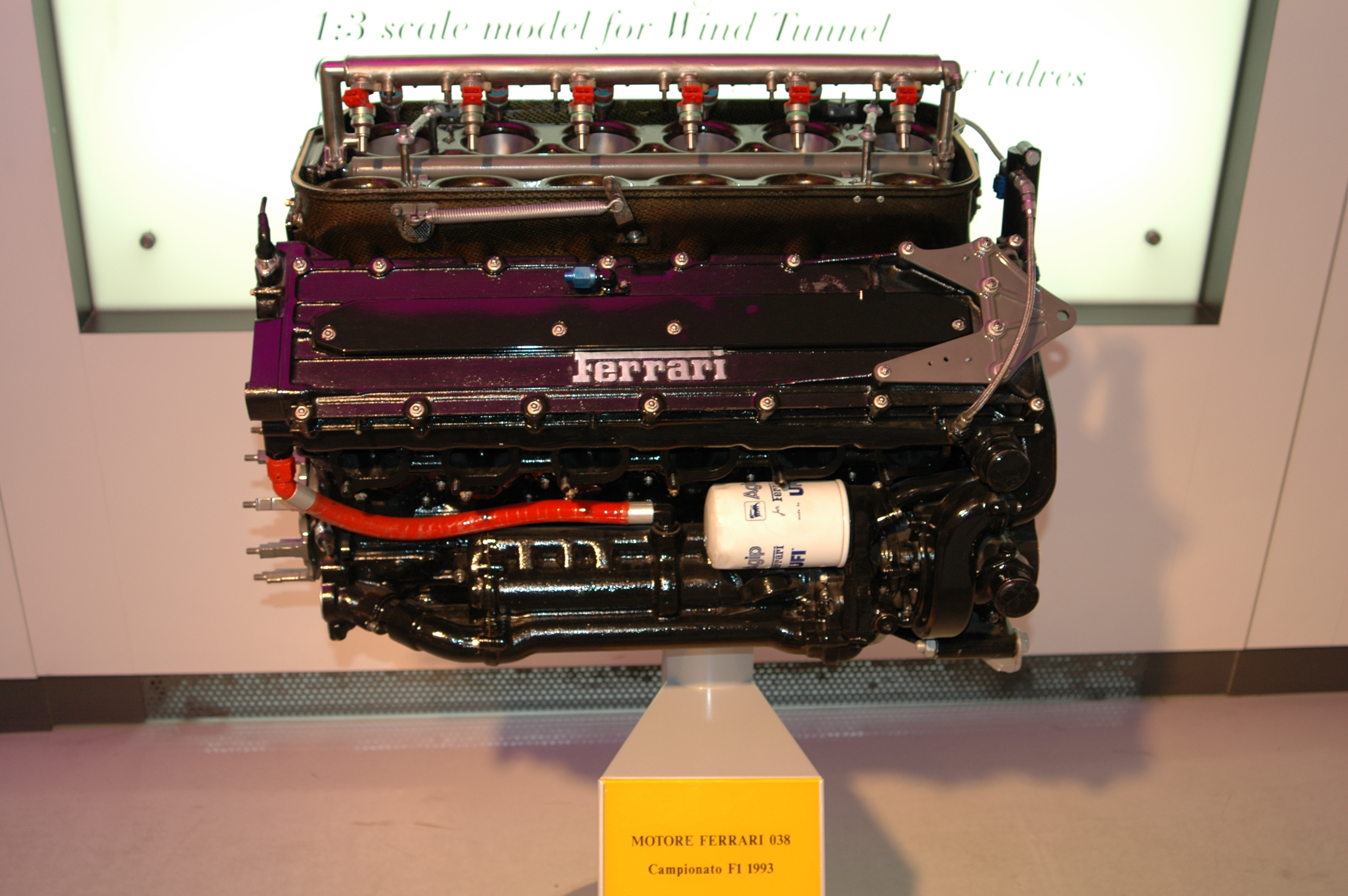
1993 Ferrari 041 engine side Museo Ferrari.

Ferrari has made a number of V12 racing engines designed for Formula One; made between 1950 and 1995. Some derived engines were also used in various Ferrari sports prototype race cars and production road cars.

== 1.5 L engine (1950–1951) ==
Ferrari's first V12 Formula One engine was the supercharged 125 Colombo engine; with the 1.5 L engine configuration imposed by the FIA for forced induction engines, in 1950. After finding only modest success with the supercharged 1.5-litre engine, Ferrari decided to switch in 1950 to a naturally-aspirated engine formula for the series.

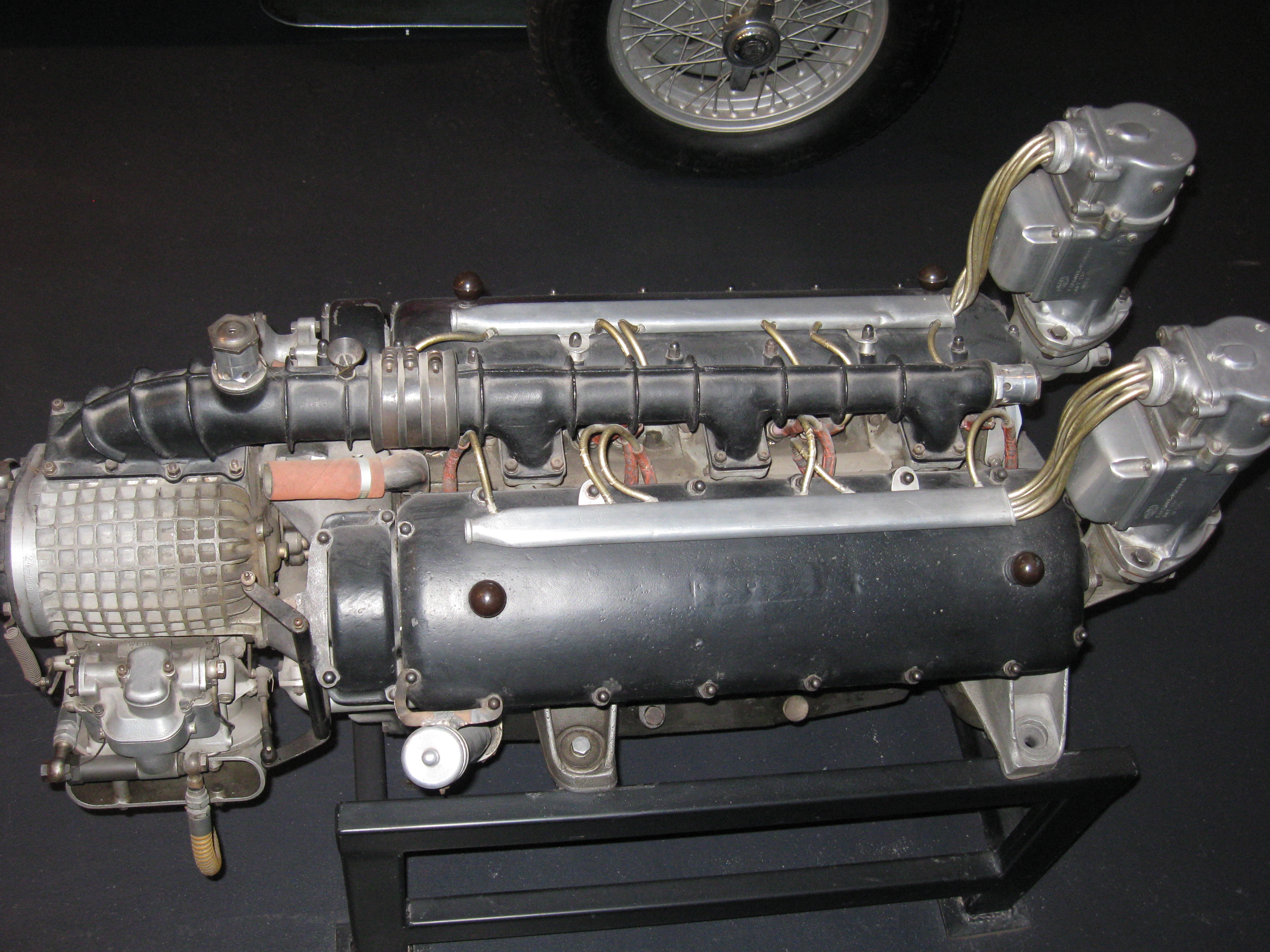
A Ferrari V12 1.5-litre supercharged Ferrari 125 F1 engine

== 3.3 L/4.1 L/4.5 L engine (1950–1951) ==
Calling in Aurelio Lampredi to replace Gioacchino Colombo as technical director, Enzo Ferrari directed that the company work in stages to grow and develop an entirely new large-displacement V12 engine for racing.

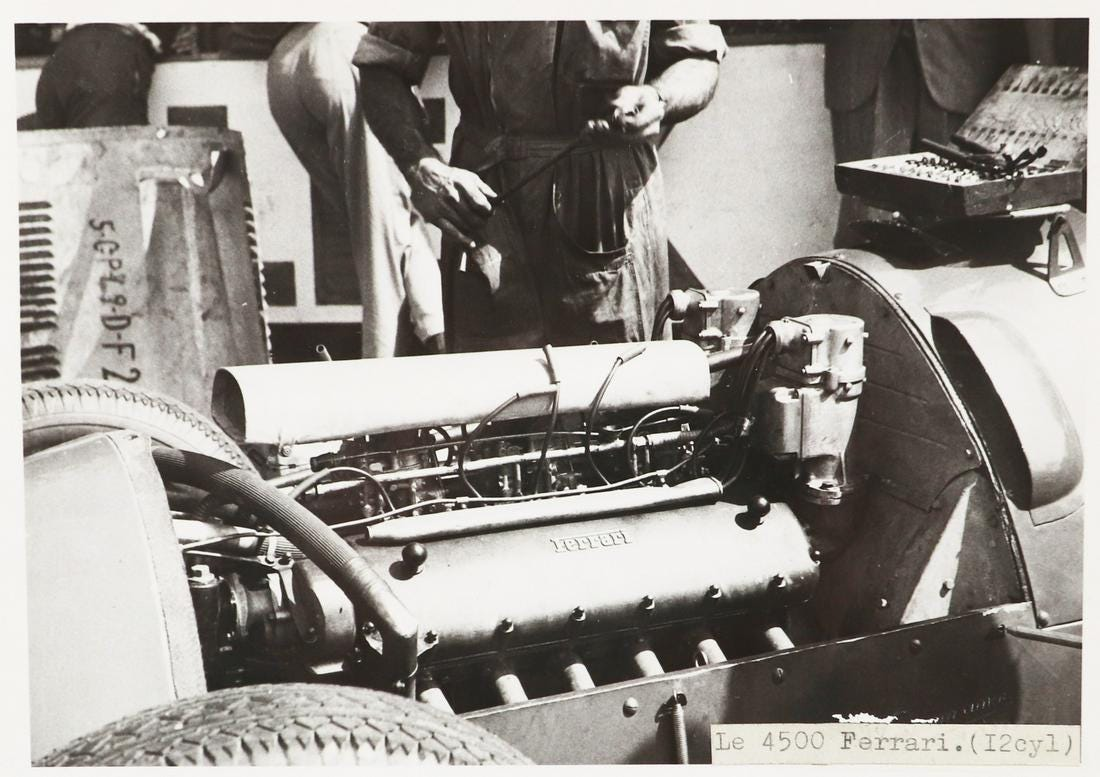
1950 Ferrari 4.5-litre V12 375 F1.

The 3.3-litre (3,322 cc; 202.7 cu in) 275 Lampredi engine made its debut at the Grand Prix of Belgium on June 18. With three Weber 42DCF carburetors, a single overhead camshaft for each bank of cylinders, and two valves per cylinder, the engine produced a capable 300 hp (224 kW) at 7200 rpm. Alberto Ascari drove the car to fifth place, marking the end of the 3.3-litre engine. The 275 was replaced at the Grand Prix of Nations at Geneva on July 30, 1950, by the 340 F1 engine. As the name suggests, the car sported a larger 4.1-litre (4,101.66 cc; 250.3 cu in) version of Lampredi's V12. With 335 hp (250 kW), Ascari was able to keep up with the Alfa Romeo 158 of Juan Manuel Fangio but retired with engine trouble. Although the 340 proved itself capable, it was only the middle step in Ferrari's 1950 car development. Ferrari achieved the 4.5-litre goal of the formula with the 375 Lampredi engine, two of which debuted at Monza on September 3, 1950. This 4.5-litre (4,493.73 cc; 274.2 cu in) engine produced roughly the same power as its 4.1-litre predecessor, but its tractability earned Ascari second place in that debut race. A series of modifications through the 1951 season allowed Ferrari to finally put Alfa Romeo behind it in a Formula One race, with José Froilán González' victory at Silverstone on July 14 becoming the constructor's first World Championship win. Ascari's wins at the Nürburgring and Monza and strong finishes throughout the season cemented the company's position as a Formula One contender.

== 2.6 L engine (1951) ==
The 1951 Ferrari 212 F1 was powered by a naturally aspirated, 2562 cc Colombo V12 engine. Rudi Fischer also entered the car in Formula Two races using a Ferrari 166 1995 cc V12 engine. He won the Formula Two races at Aix-les-Bains and Angoulême in 1951.

== 3.0 L engine (1966–1969) ==
For the 1966 Formula One season, there was a change in the technical regulations, now allowing 3-litre engines. Ferrari's first 1966 car consisted of a 3.3-litre V12 engine that was taken from the Ferrari 275P2 sportscar prototypes, modified to 3 litres, and mounted in the back of an F1 chassis. The designation 312, which would be used for a number of later cars, indicated a 3-litre, 12-cylinder engine. The engine was rather heavy, and due to the reduced capacity, lower on power and especially torque. John Surtees drove this contraption unsuccessfully in Monaco while Lorenzo Bandini drove a Ferrari Dino 2.4-litre V6. Surtees won the second race, the 1966 Belgian Grand Prix, a track that favoured power with its long straights, but the 1964 champion departed after a row with manager Eugenio Dragoni. The issue was about priorities in racing, as Ferrari was under pressure from Ford in sports car racing, and the F1 effort was somewhat neglected. Mike Parkes replaced Surtees, who went to Cooper which used Maserati engines, to finish second in the driver championship with a further win. For Ferrari, Ludovico Scarfiotti also won a race, the 1966 Italian Grand Prix at Monza which helped Ferrari finish second in the Constructors' Championship.

== 3.5 L engine (1989–1994) ==
The 3.5-litre Tipo 035/5 V12 engine, introduced in 1989, was designed in accordance with the new regulations imposed by the FIA, after the ban on turbocharged engines. The 640 was powered by Ferrari's Tipo 035/5, a 3.5-litre 65° V12 engine which initially produced 600 bhp (447 kW; 608 PS), but eventually outputted up to 660 bhp (492 kW; 669 PS) by the season end, roughly the same amount of power as the engine it replaced, the Tipo 033A V6 turbo, though without the turbo's fuel consumption worries. The engine was unreliable, but it won on its debut race.

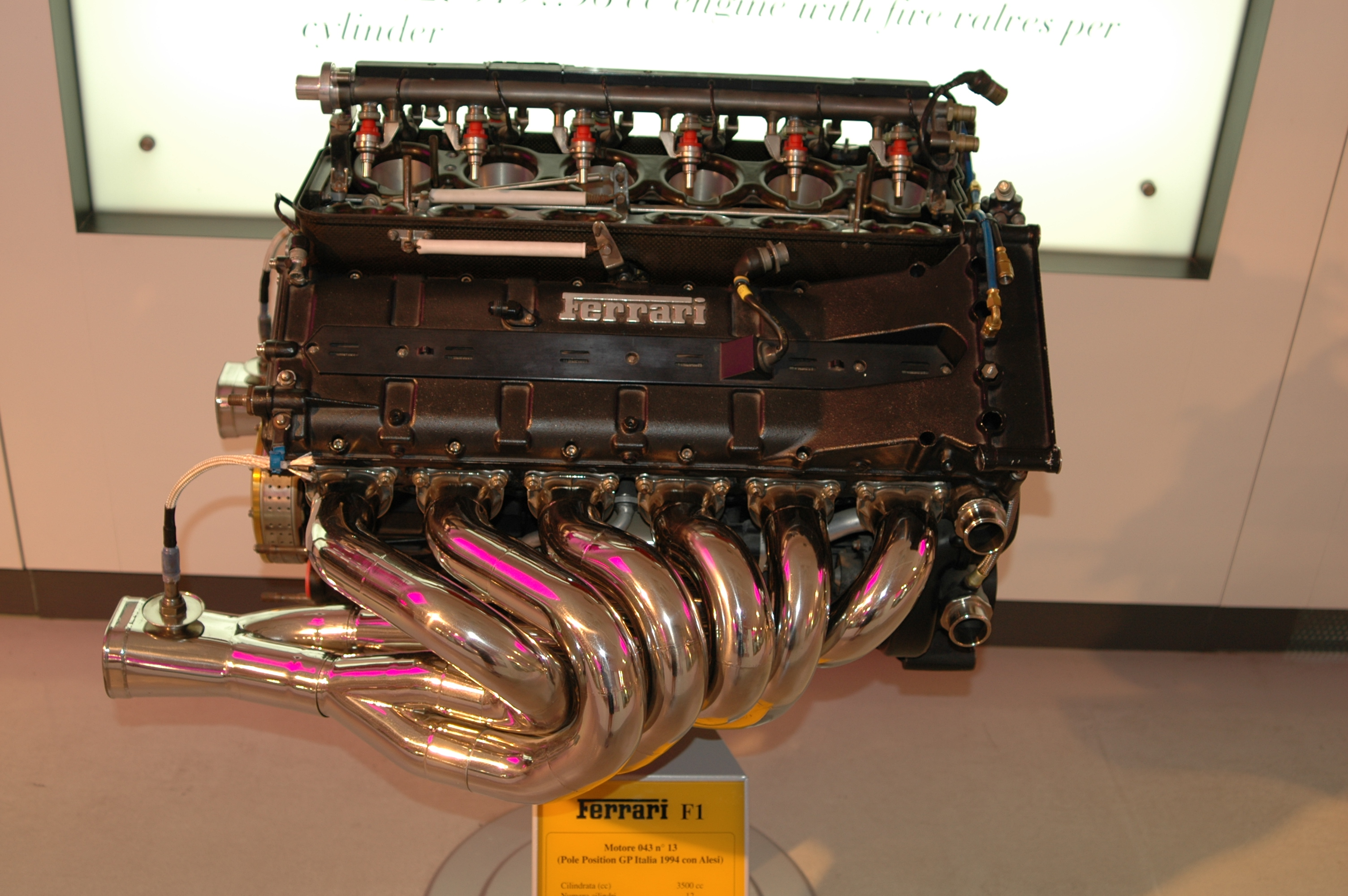
Ferrari 3.5 Tipo 043 V12 F1 engine (1994).

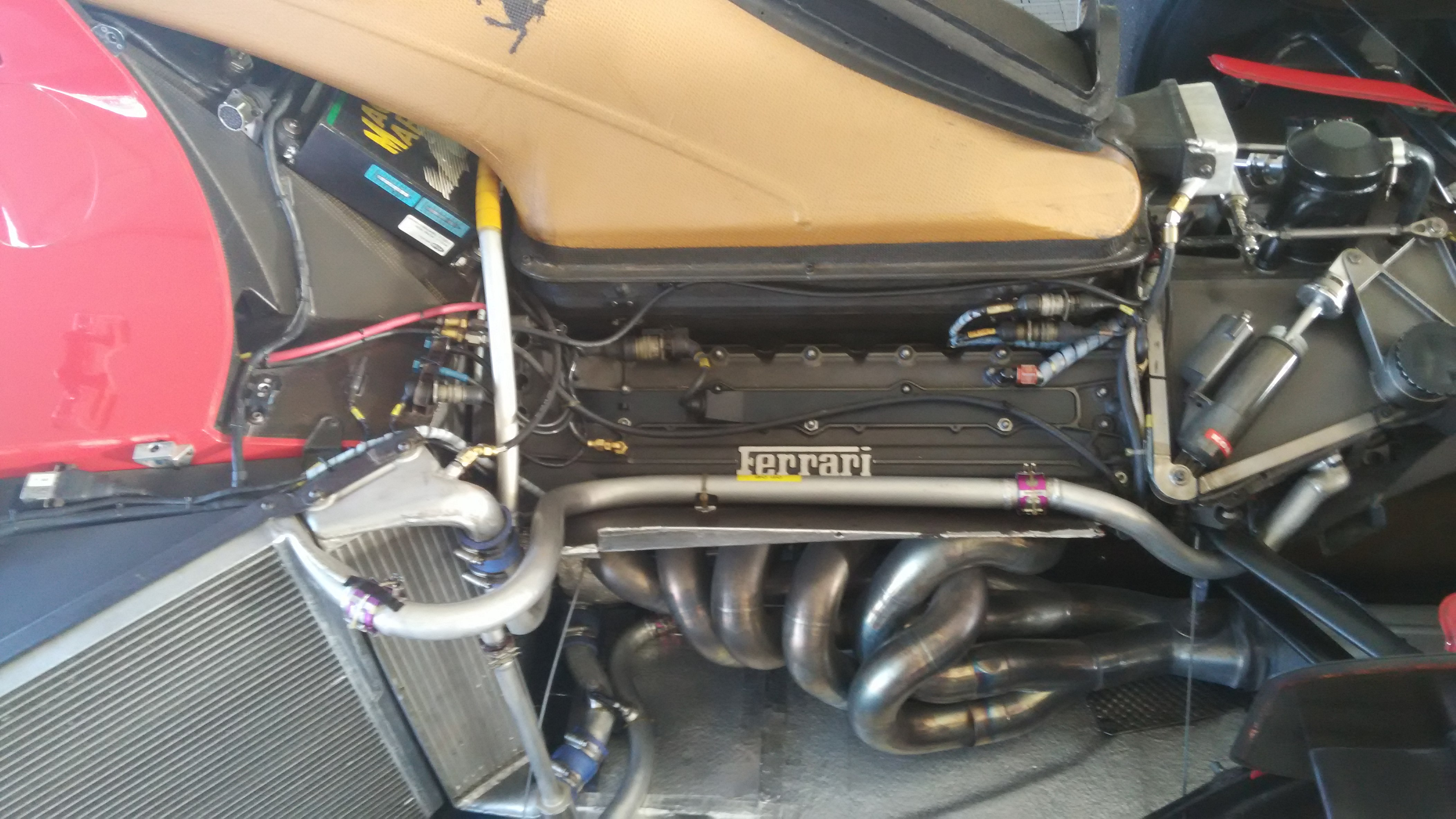
1994 Ferrari Tipo 043 3.5 V12 engine; the most powerful in F1 history

The Ferrari 641 was powered by the 3.5-litre Tipo 036 V12 engine, and later in San Marino by the updated 710 bhp (529 kW; 720 PS) Tipo 037. The Tipo 036 V12 was rated at 680 bhp (507 kW; 689 PS), only slightly down on the 690 bhp (515 kW; 700 PS) Honda V10 engines used by McLaren, but not as flexible or as good at delivering power out of slow corners as the Honda, the Renault V10 engine used by Williams or the Ford-Cosworth HB V8 used by Benetton.

During the early part of the 1994 season, the Tipo 041 engine, used in the Ferrari 412 T1, initially produced 750 bhp at 15,300 rpm. This quickly and heavily evolved, when a new engine, named Tipo 043 debuted at the 1994 San Marino Grand Prix qualifying sessions, and was first raced in Hockenheim. It was designed from scratch by Claudio Lombardi and former Honda F1 chief engine designer Osamu Goto with a wider vee-angle of 75 degrees (up from 65 degrees) and a shorter stroke, replacing the old Tipo 041; Ferrari had brought on a number of engineers from the successful Honda F1 engine program. The 043 became famous for its great amount of power (over 830 bhp) and for its characteristic noise.

By the end of the 1994 season, Ferrari's Tipo 043 V12 was putting out around 850 hp (634 kW) at 15,800 rpm, which is to date the most powerful naturally-aspirated V12 engine ever used in Formula One.

== 3.0 L engine (1995) ==
Ferrari's last V12 engine, the Tipo 044/1, was used in 1995, before a switch to V10 engines for 1996. The engine's design was largely influenced by major regulation changes imposed by the FIA after the dreadful events during the year before: the 75° V12 engine was reduced from 3.5 to 3.0-litres. The 3.0-litre engine produced around 700 hp (522 kW) 17,000 rpm in race trim; but was reportedly capable of producing up to 760 hp in its highest state of tune for qualifying. They eventually switched to a more conventional V10 engine for 1996, which offered the best compromise between power and fuel efficiency; the V12 was powerful but thirsty, and vice versa for a V8.

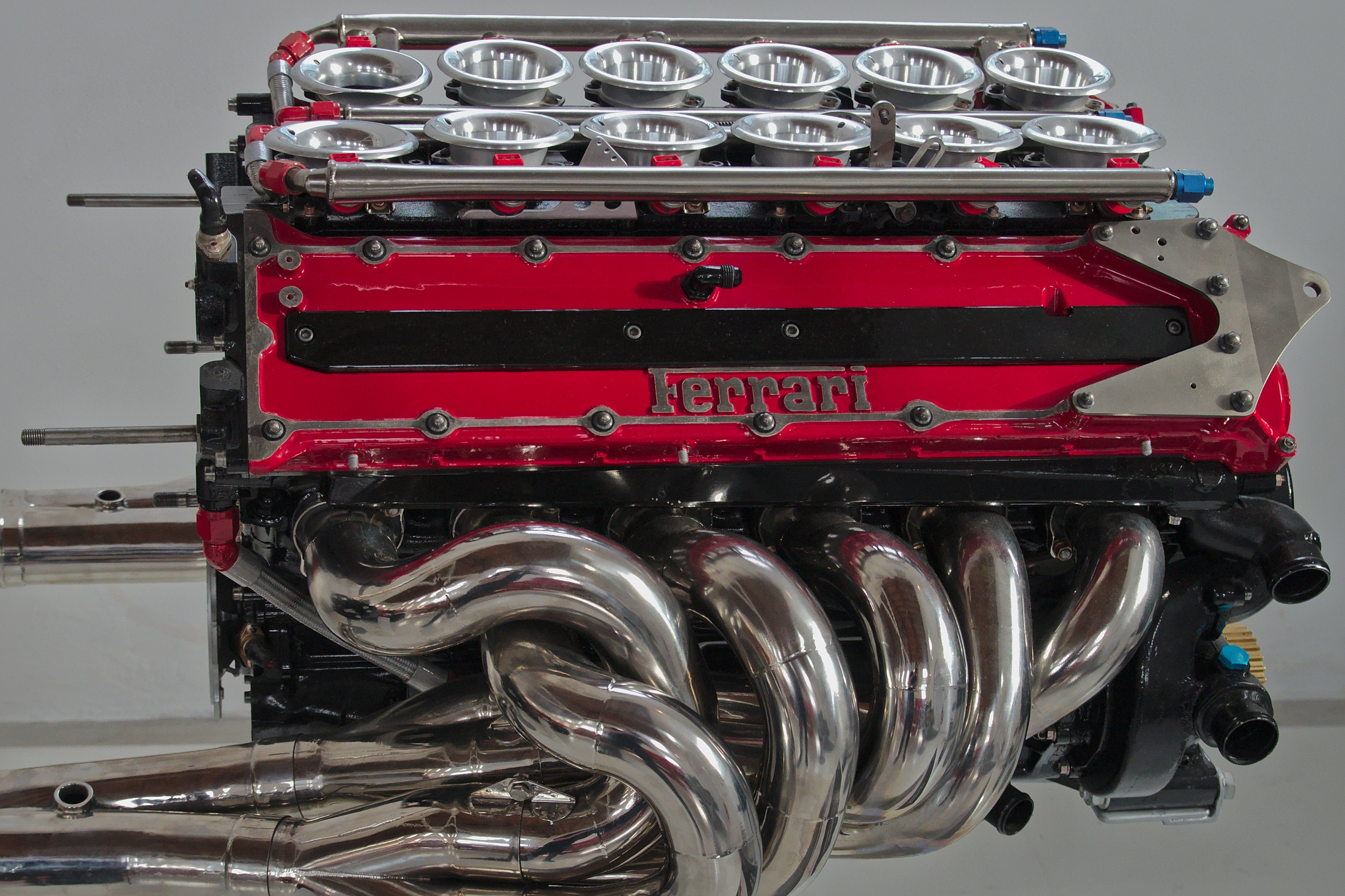
Ferrari V12 F1 engine.

== Other applications ==
The Tipo F130E engine used in the Ferrari F333 SP sports prototype was a modified version of the 65-degree V12 engine used in the 1990 Ferrari 641 Formula One car, enlarged from 3.5 L to 4.0 L, for longevity, durability, and reliability, and producing 641 hp (650 PS; 478 kW) at 11,000 rpm; detuned on power and revs from the original engine by about 40 hp (41 PS; 30 kW), for longevity and reliability purposes. The bore and stroke were set to 85 mm and 58.7 mm, respectively, giving each cylinder 333.09 cc, for a total displacement of 3,997.11 cc (4 L; 244 cu in). Southgate later described it as "one of the most reliable race engines I have ever worked with."

The 4.7 L naturally aspirated Tipo F130B 60-valve V12 engine used in the Ferrari F50 was developed from the 3.5 L V12 used in the 1990 Ferrari 641 Formula One car. It made 382 kW (519 PS; 512 bhp) at 8,500 rpm, and 491 N⋅m (50 kg⋅m; 362 lb⋅ft) at 6,500 rpm.

The 4.7-litre V12 engine used in the Ferrari F50 GT (which never raced) was highly tuned and developed to generate around 750 PS (552 kW; 740 hp) at 10,500 rpm and 529 N⋅m (390 lb⋅ft) of torque at 7,500 rpm.

== Applications ==
=== Formula 1 cars ===
- Ferrari 125 F1 (125 Colombo)
- Ferrari 212 F1 (212 Colombo)
- 275 F1 / 340 F1 / 375 F1 (Tipo 275 / Tipo 340 / Tipo 375)
- Ferrari 312 F1 (Tipo 228, Tipo 218, Tipo 242, Tipo 242C)
- Ferrari 640 / F1-89 (Tipo 035/5)
- Ferrari 641 / F1-90 (Tipo 036)
- Ferrari 642 / F1-91 (Tipo 037 / Tipo 291)
- Ferrari 643 (Tipo 291)
- Ferrari F92A (Tipo 038 / E1 A-92)
- Ferrari F93A (Tipo 041 / E2 A-93)
- Ferrari 412 T1 (Tipo 043 / E4 A-94)
- Ferrari 412 T2 (Tipo 044/1)

=== Sports cars/Sports Prototype race cars ===
- Ferrari 312 P
- Ferrari F333 SP (Tipo F130E)
- Ferrari F50 GT

=== Road cars ===
- Ferrari F50 (Tipo F130B)

== See also ==
- List of Ferrari engines
- Maserati V12 engine
