= Ferrari F93A =

1993 Formula One racing car by Ferrari

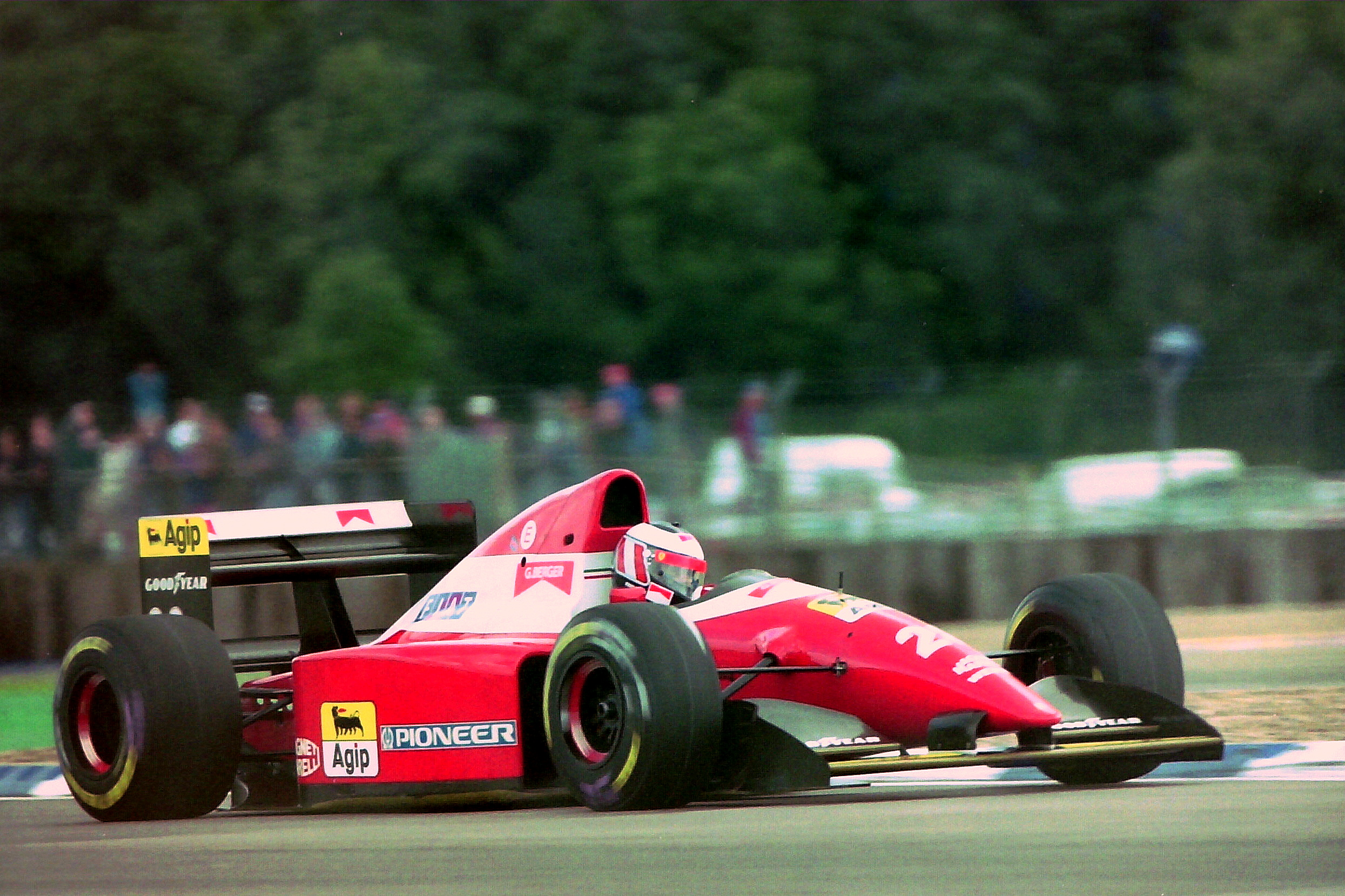
- Gerhard Berger driving the F93A during the free practice session at the 1993 British Grand Prix
- Category: Formula One
- Constructor: Ferrari
- Designers: Valerio Bianchi (Technical Director); Jean-Claude Migeot (Chief Designer); George Ryton (Head of Chassis Design); Gianfranco Ciampolini (Head of Electronics); Claudio Lombardi (Engine Department Director)
- Predecessor: F92A
- Successor: 412 T1

Technical specifications
- Chassis: Carbon fibre monocoque
- Suspension (front): Independent torsion arms, electronic actuators
- Suspension (rear): Independent torsion arms, electronic actuators
- Axle track: Front: 1,690 mm (67 in); Rear: 1,605 mm (63.2 in)
- Wheelbase: 2,930 mm (115 in)
- Engine: Ferrari Tipo 041 (E2 A-93), 3,497 cc (213.4 cu in), 65° V12, NA, mid-engine, longitudinally mounted
- Transmission: Ferrari 6-speed sequential semi-automatic
- Power: 745 hp (556 kW) @ 15,000 rpm
- Weight: 505 kg (1,113 lb)
- Fuel: Agip
- Tyres: Goodyear

Competition history
- Notable entrants: Scuderia Ferrari SpA
- Notable drivers: 27. (France) Jean Alesi; 28. (Austria) Gerhard Berger
- Debut: 1993 South African Grand Prix
- Last event: 1993 Australian Grand Prix
Races	Wins	Podiums	Poles	F/Laps
16	0	3	0	0
- Constructors' Championships: 0
- Drivers' Championships: 0

The Ferrari F93A was the Formula One racing car with which Scuderia Ferrari competed in the 1993 Formula One World Championship. Designed by Jean-Claude Migeot, the car carried the team's own 745 bhp V12 engine and ran on Goodyear tyres. It was driven by Frenchman Jean Alesi, in his third season with Ferrari, and Austrian veteran Gerhard Berger, who had returned to the team after three years at McLaren.

== Overview ==
The car was not competitive, and Ferrari endured its third consecutive winless season. Alesi scored the best result with second place at the team's home race in Italy and led the opening laps in Portugal, while the team was involved in a season long battle with Ligier for fourth in the Constructors' Championship, a contest that Ferrari only secured with a double points finish at the final race in Australia. The car scored a total of 28 points during the season.

The F93A was replaced for 1994 by the Ferrari 412 T1.

== Livery ==
The F93A sported a red and white livery, as opposed to the team's traditional all-red scheme.

Ferrari used the 'Marlboro' logos, except at the French, British, German and European Grands Prix.

== Complete Formula One results ==
(key)

Year	Team	Engine	Tyres	Drivers	1	2	3	4	5	6	7	8	9	10	11	12	13	14	15	16	Points	WCC
1993	Scuderia Ferrari	Ferrari Tipo 041 (E2 A-93); V12	G		RSA	BRA	EUR	SMR	ESP	MON	CAN	FRA	GBR	GER	HUN	BEL	ITA	POR	JPN	AUS	28	4th
1993	Scuderia Ferrari	Ferrari Tipo 041 (E2 A-93); V12	G	Jean Alesi	Ret	8	Ret	Ret	Ret	3	Ret	Ret	9	7	Ret	Ret	2	4	Ret	4	28	4th
1993	Scuderia Ferrari	Ferrari Tipo 041 (E2 A-93); V12	G	Gerhard Berger	6	Ret	Ret	Ret	6	14	4	14	Ret	6	3	10	Ret	Ret	Ret	5	28	4th
