= McLaren M3 =

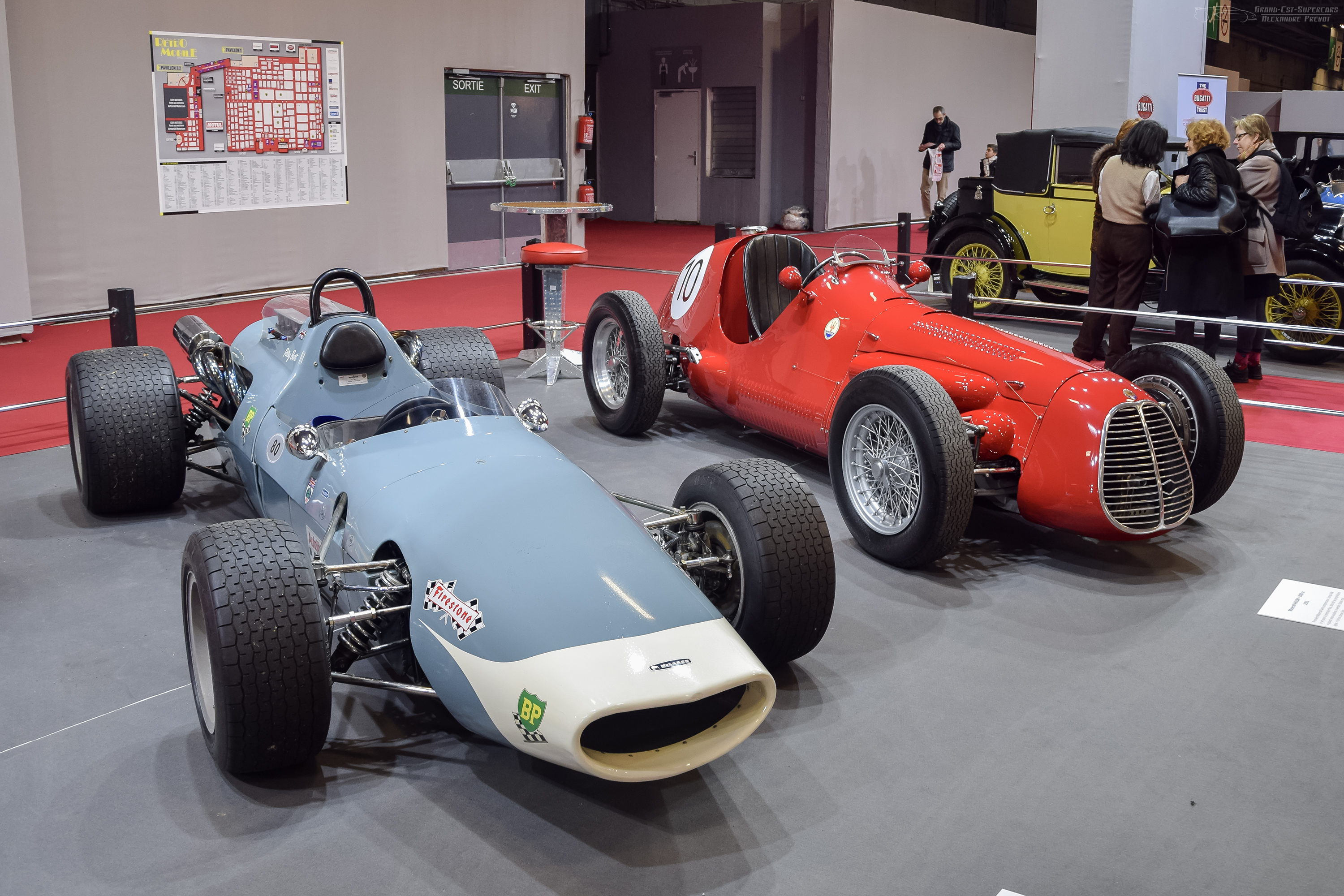
- McLaren M3A in a museum
- Category: Formula Libre
- Constructor: McLaren
- Production: 1965-1966

Technical specifications
- Chassis: Steel-reinforced tubular space frame covered in aluminum panels
- Length: 142 in (3,600 mm)
- Height: 29 in (740 mm)
- Axle track: Front: 51 in (1,300 mm); Rear: 52 in (1,300 mm)
- Wheelbase: 96 in (2,400 mm)
- Engine: Various
- Transmission: Hewland L.G. or ZF DS25
- Weight: ~ 1,100 lb (500 kg)

Competition history

The McLaren M3 was an open-wheel race car, designed, developed and built by British manufacturer McLaren in 1965. It was used mostly in Formula Libre racing, but was very versatile and competitive, and was also used in other motorsport categories and disciplines, such as hillclimb racing, and sprint car racing. It used no particular engine, but was capable of using (down to customers' own preference); an Oldsmobile V8, a Ford FE, a Ford Indy V8, a Repco-Brabham V8, a Maserati V12, or even a 2.5–2.7 L (150–160 cu in) Coventry Climax four-cylinder Formula One engine. The chassis was constructed out of a tubular space frame, covered in an aluminum panel body, with extra aluminum riveted and bolted to the undercarriage of the car, to add extra strength and rigidity. This meant weight was around (approximately) 1,100 lb (500 kg).
