= Ferrari 412 T1 =

1994 Formula One racing car by Ferrari

Ferrari 412 T1 Ferrari 412 T1B
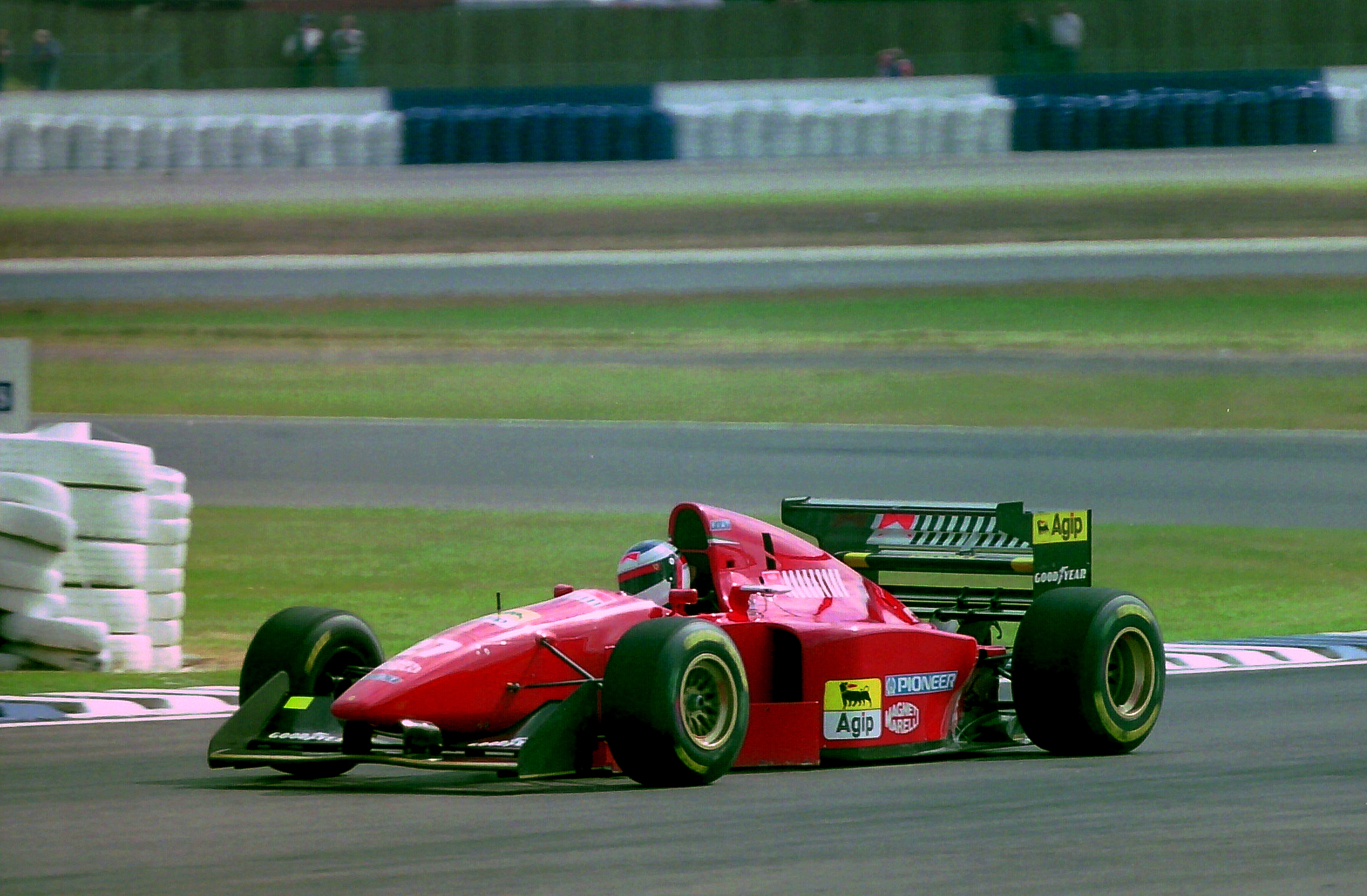
- Jean Alesi driving the 412 T1B at the 1994 British Grand Prix
- Category: Formula One
- Constructor: Ferrari
- Designers: John Barnard (Technical Director); Gustav Brunner (Chief Designer); George Ryton (Head of Chassis Design); Mike Coughlan (Head of R&D); Tony Tyler (Chief Aerodynamicist); Claudio Lombardi (Engine Department Director); Osamu Goto (Chief Engine Designer)
- Predecessor: F93A
- Successor: 412 T2

Technical specifications
- Chassis: carbon-fibre and honeycomb composite structure
- Suspension (front): pushrod with torsion bars
- Suspension (rear): pushrod with torsion bars
- Engine: Ferrari E4A-94 (Tipo 041), 3.5-litre 65-degree V12; Ferrari Tipo 043, 3.5-litre 75-degree V12
- Transmission: Ferrari six-speed sequential semi-automatic
- Power: 750 hp (559 kW) @ 15,300 rpm (early season); 850 hp (634 kW) @ 15,800 rpm (late season)
- Fuel: Agip
- Tyres: Goodyear

Competition history
- Notable entrants: Scuderia Ferrari
- Notable drivers: 27. (France) Jean Alesi; 27. (Italy) Nicola Larini; 28. (Austria) Gerhard Berger
- Debut: 1994 Brazilian Grand Prix
- First win: 1994 German Grand Prix
- Last win: 1994 German Grand Prix
- Last event: 1994 Australian Grand Prix
Races	Wins	Podiums	Poles	F/Laps
16	1	11	3	0

The Ferrari 412 T1 was the Formula One racing car with which Scuderia Ferrari competed in the 1994 Formula One World Championship. It was designed by John Barnard and then developed by Gustav Brunner.

== Overview ==
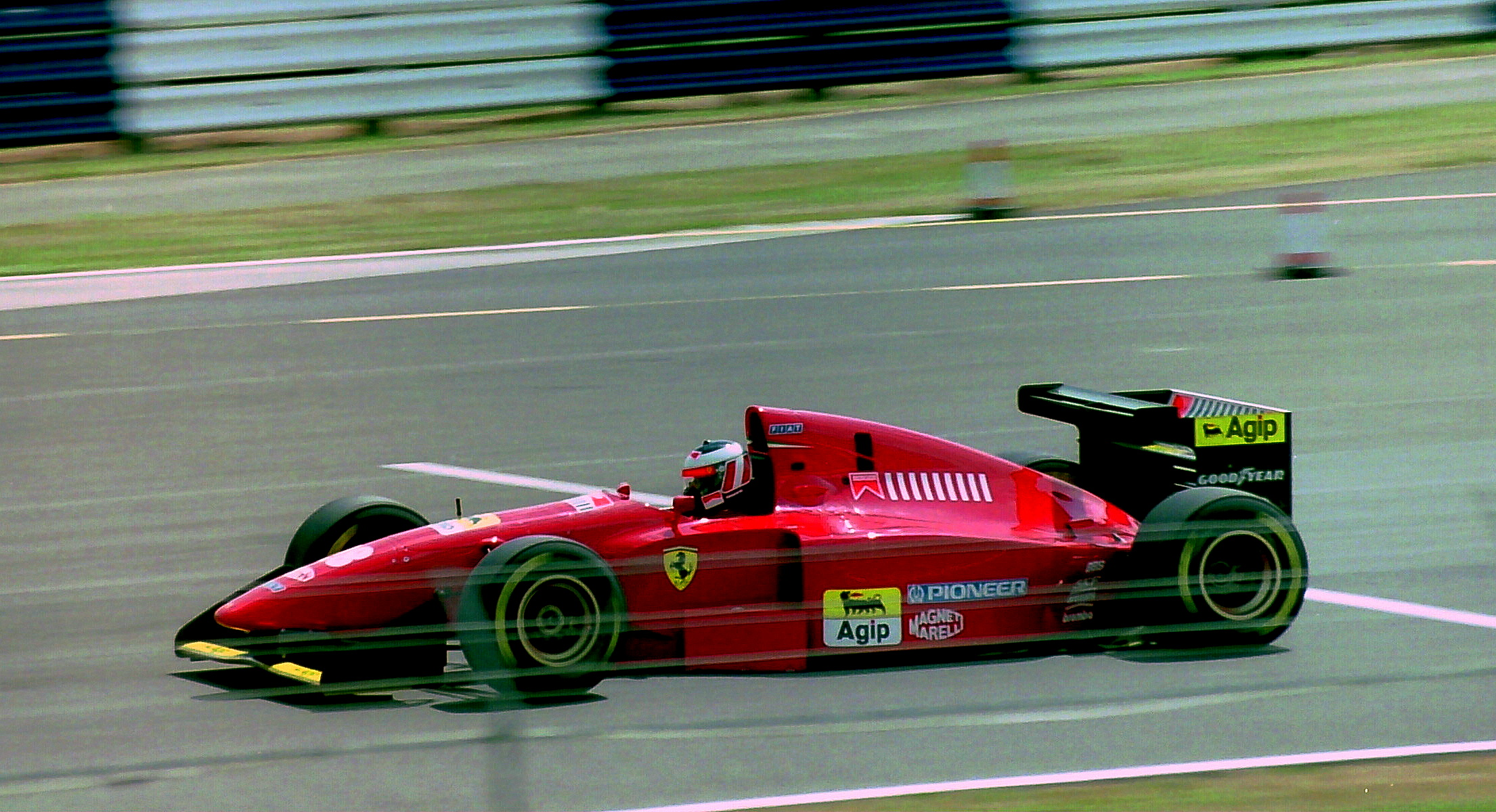
Gerhard Berger driving the 412 T1 at the 1994 British Grand Prix.

The car was a simple and straightforward design that worked well, powered by a 3.5 litre V12 engine. In the name of the new car, the 4 stood for the number of valves per cylinder while the 12 was for the number of cylinders and the T referred to the transverse gearbox with its six normal gears and one reverse. The car featured heavily sculptured sidepods and a sleek rounded nosecone, aiding aerodynamics.

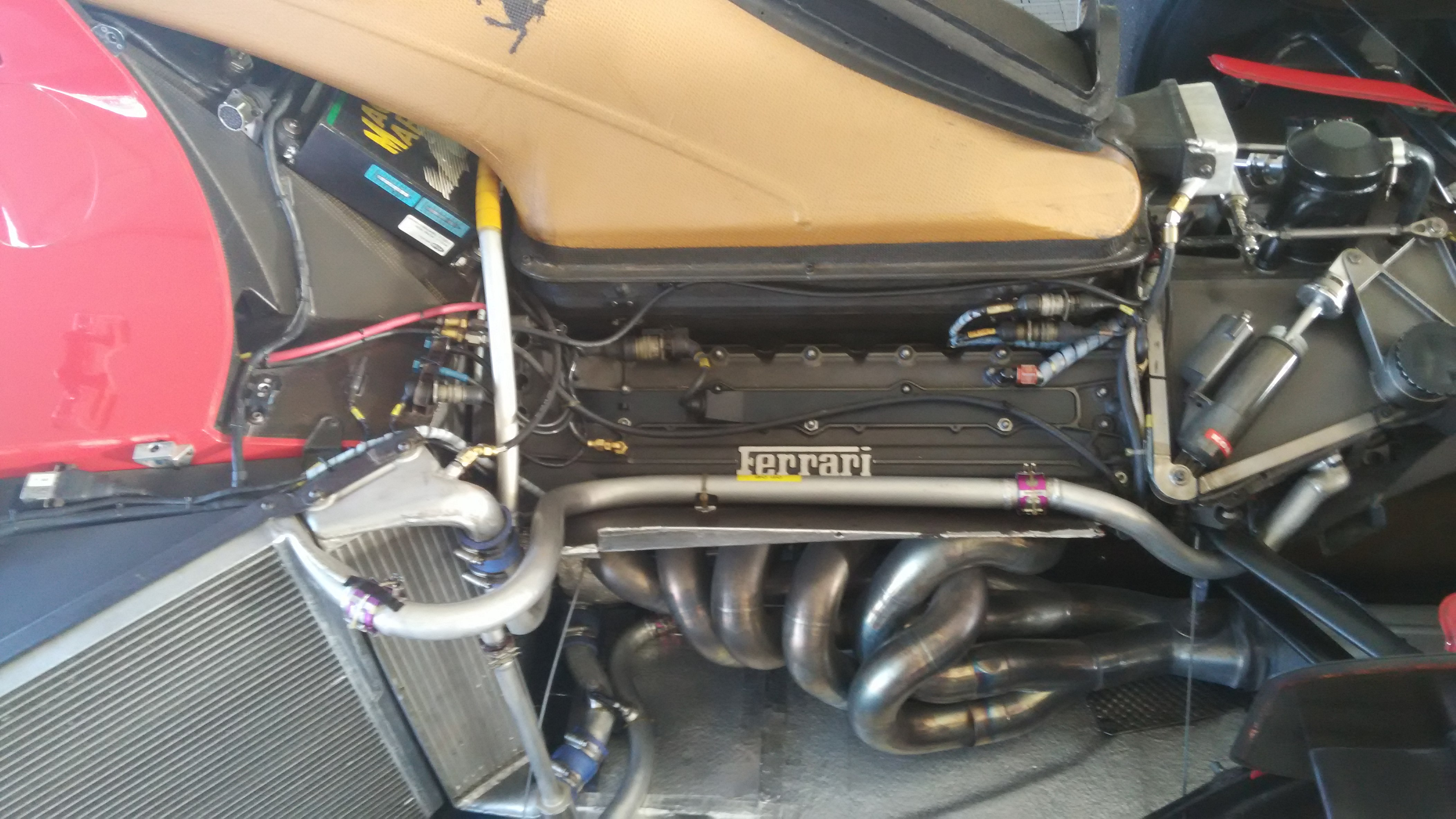
V12 engine and radiators of Ferrari 412 T1.

The car was continually upgraded with redesigned sidepods and wings throughout the season. So many changes were made that the later cars were called the 412 T1B. A new engine named Tipo 043 debuted at the 1994 San Marino Grand Prix qualifying sessions, and was first raced in Hockenheim. It was designed from scratch by Claudio Lombardi and former Honda F1 chief engine designer Osamu Goto with a wider vee-angle of 75 degrees (up from 65 degrees) and a shorter stroke, replacing the old Tipo 041; Ferrari had brought on a number of engineers from the successful Honda F1 engine program. The 043 became famous for its great amount of power (over 830 bhp) and for its characteristic noise.

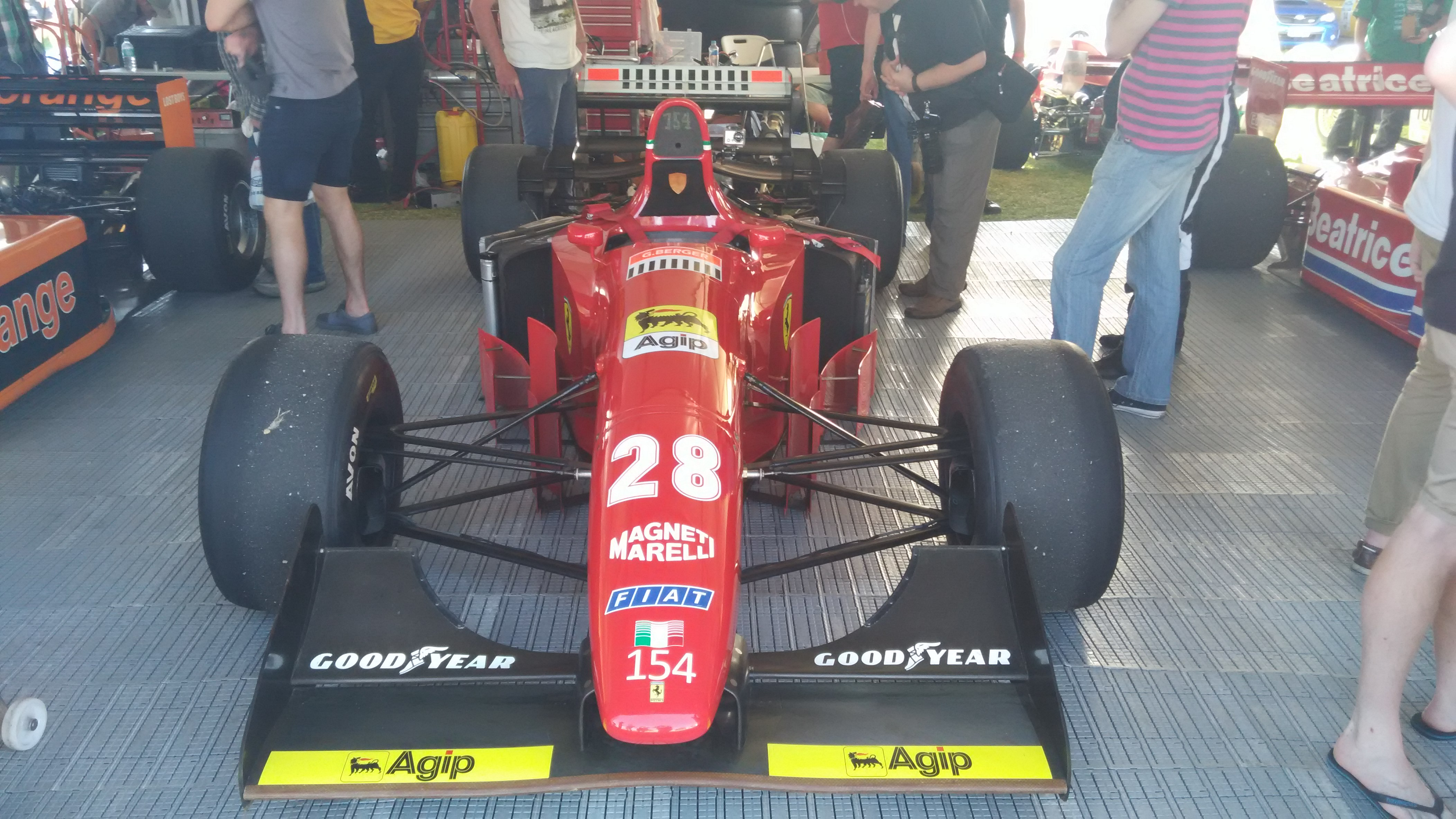
Ferrari 412 T1 of Gerhard Berger at Adelaide Motorsport Festival 2015.

The 412 T1 put Ferrari on the right track after several winless seasons in the early 1990s. Gerhard Berger and Jean Alesi proved the car's competitiveness throughout the season, with a brace of podium finishes and some pole positions. Ferrari returned to Grand Prix success after a long break, with Berger winning the 1994 German Grand Prix.

For the following year a new car, the 412 T2 came out which received many changes that aided both aero and safety.

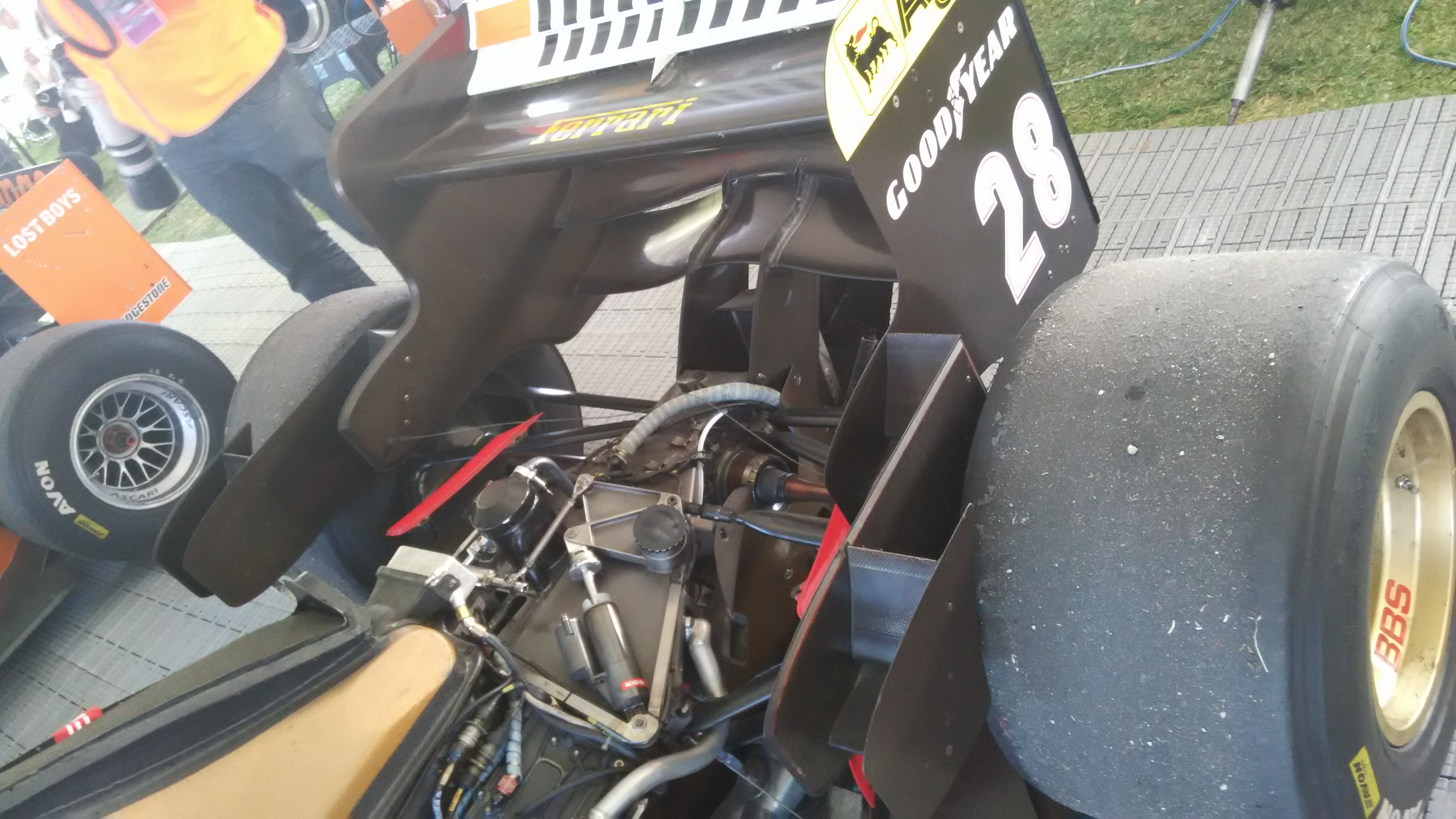
Gearbox, rear suspension rockers and rear wing of Ferrari 412 T1.

== Complete Formula One results ==
(key) (results in bold indicate pole position; results in italics indicate fastest lap)

Year	Team	Chassis	Engine	Tyres	Drivers	1	2	3	4	5	6	7	8	9	10	11	12	13	14	15	16	Points	WCC
1994	Scuderia Ferrari	412 T1; 412 T1B	Ferrari Tipo 041; Ferrari Tipo 043; V12	**G**		BRA	PAC	SMR	MON	ESP	CAN	FRA	GBR	GER	HUN	BEL	ITA	POR	EUR	JPN	AUS	**71**	**3rd**
1994	Scuderia Ferrari	412 T1; 412 T1B	Ferrari Tipo 041; Ferrari Tipo 043; V12	**G**	(France) Jean Alesi	3			5	4	3	Ret	2	Ret	Ret	Ret	**Ret**	Ret	10	3	6	**71**	**3rd**
1994	Scuderia Ferrari	412 T1; 412 T1B	Ferrari Tipo 041; Ferrari Tipo 043; V12	**G**	(Italy) Nicola Larini		Ret	2														**71**	**3rd**
1994	Scuderia Ferrari	412 T1; 412 T1B	Ferrari Tipo 041; Ferrari Tipo 043; V12	**G**	(Austria) Gerhard Berger	Ret	2	Ret	3	Ret	4	3	Ret	**1**	12	Ret	2	**Ret**	5	Ret	2	**71**	**3rd**
