= Ferrari 412 T2 =

1995 Formula One racing car by Ferrari

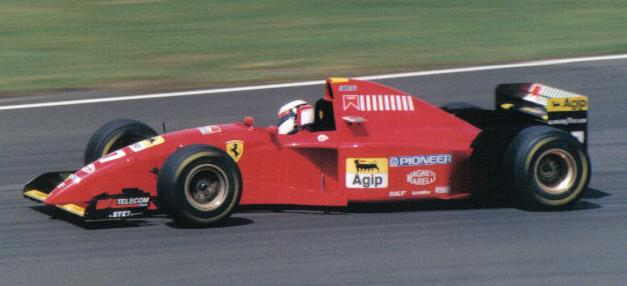
- Jean Alesi driving the 412 T2 at the 1995 British Grand Prix.
- Category: Formula One
- Constructor: Ferrari
- Designers: John Barnard (Technical Director); Gustav Brunner (Chief Designer); George Ryton (Head of Chassis Design); Mike Coughlan (Head of R&D); Willem Toet (Head of Aerodynamics); Tony Tyler (Chief Aerodynamicist); Paolo Martinelli (Engine Technical Director); Osamu Goto (Chief Engine Designer/Head of R&D)
- Predecessor: 412 T1
- Successor: F310

Technical specifications
- Chassis: carbon-fibre and honeycomb composite structure
- Suspension (front): pushrod with torsion bars
- Suspension (rear): pushrod with torsion bars
- Engine: Ferrari Tipo 044/1 2,997 cc (183 cu in) 3.0-liter 75° V12, rear longitudinal mounted
- Transmission: Ferrari electro-hydraulic 6 speed + reverse Sequential Manual Transmission
- Power: 700 to 760 PS (690 to 750 hp; 515 to 559 kW) @ 17,000 rpm
- Weight: 595–620 kg (1,312–1,367 lb)
- Fuel: Agip
- Tyres: Goodyear

Competition history
- Notable entrants: Scuderia Ferrari
- Notable drivers: 27. (France) Jean Alesi; 28. (Austria) Gerhard Berger
- Debut: 1995 Brazilian Grand Prix
- First win: 1995 Canadian Grand Prix
- Last win: 1995 Canadian Grand Prix
- Last event: 1995 Australian Grand Prix
Races	Wins	Podiums	Poles	F/Laps
17	1	11	1	3

The Ferrari 412 T2 was the car with which Ferrari competed in the 1995 Formula One World Championship. Designed by John Barnard and Gustav Brunner at Shalford in the United Kingdom, the car was launched at Maranello on 6 February 1995.

== Design ==
The 412 T2's design was largely influenced by major regulation changes imposed by the FIA after the tragic events during the year before: the V12 engine was reduced from 3.5 to 3.0 litre, while new side protection structures were added around the driver's helmet.

Despite concurrent work on the future V10 unit, the engine was 20lb lighter than in 1994 due to use of steel rather than cast iron, fuel capacity was reduced to 125 litres and as a consequence the engine could be mounted further forward. The exhausts were initially inserted through the rear diffuser, however this was changed mid season. The gearbox was again mounted to the block in transverse, improving rear-end weight distribution.

Aerodynamics were revised with larger and more complex bargeboards, while the front and rear wings were also modified to reduce downforce according to the new regulations. In opposition to the majority of teams in 1995, Barnard also dropped the 'raised nose' design which Ferrari had been using for the previous three seasons.

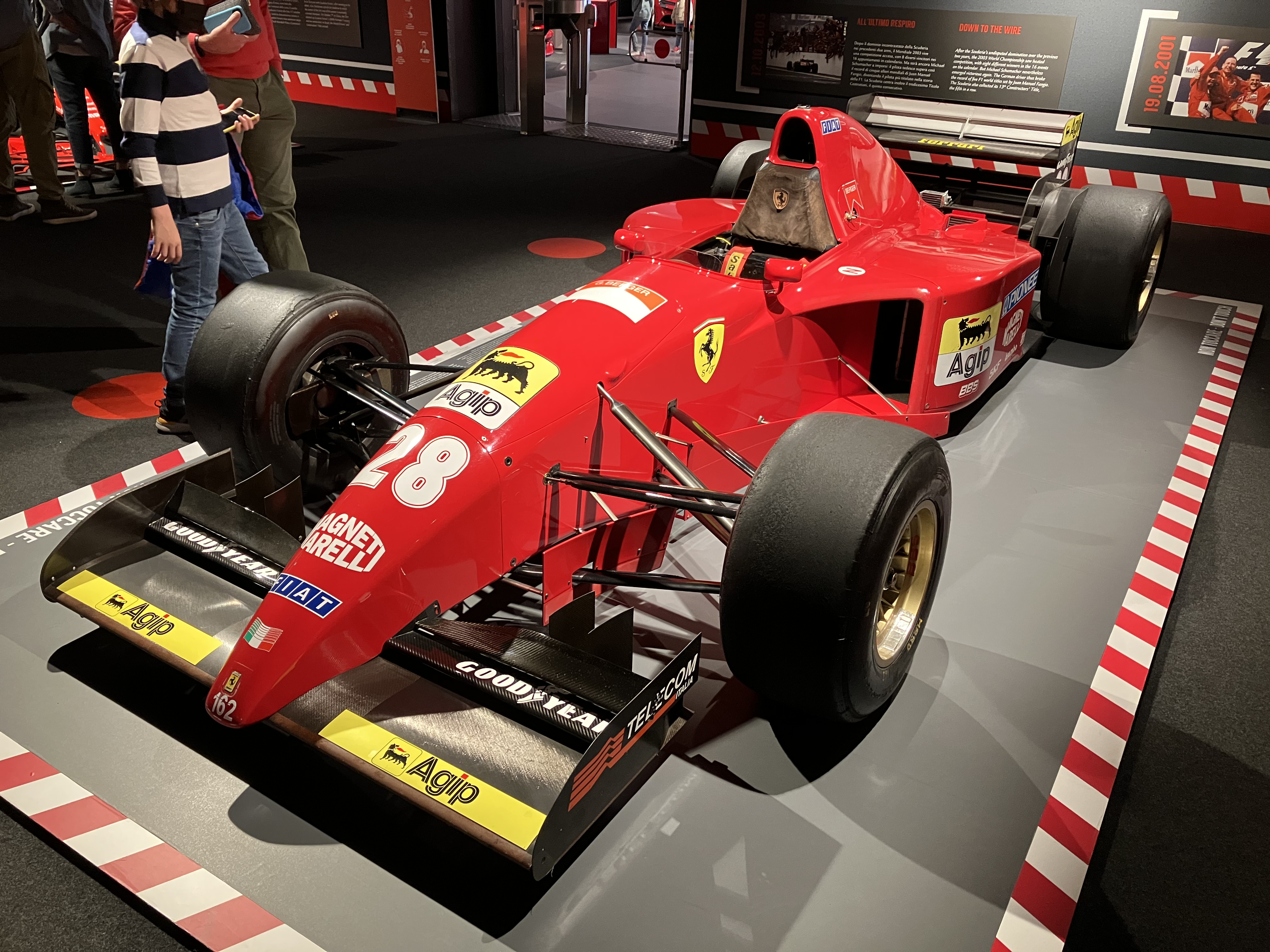
412 T2 at the Museo Ferrari

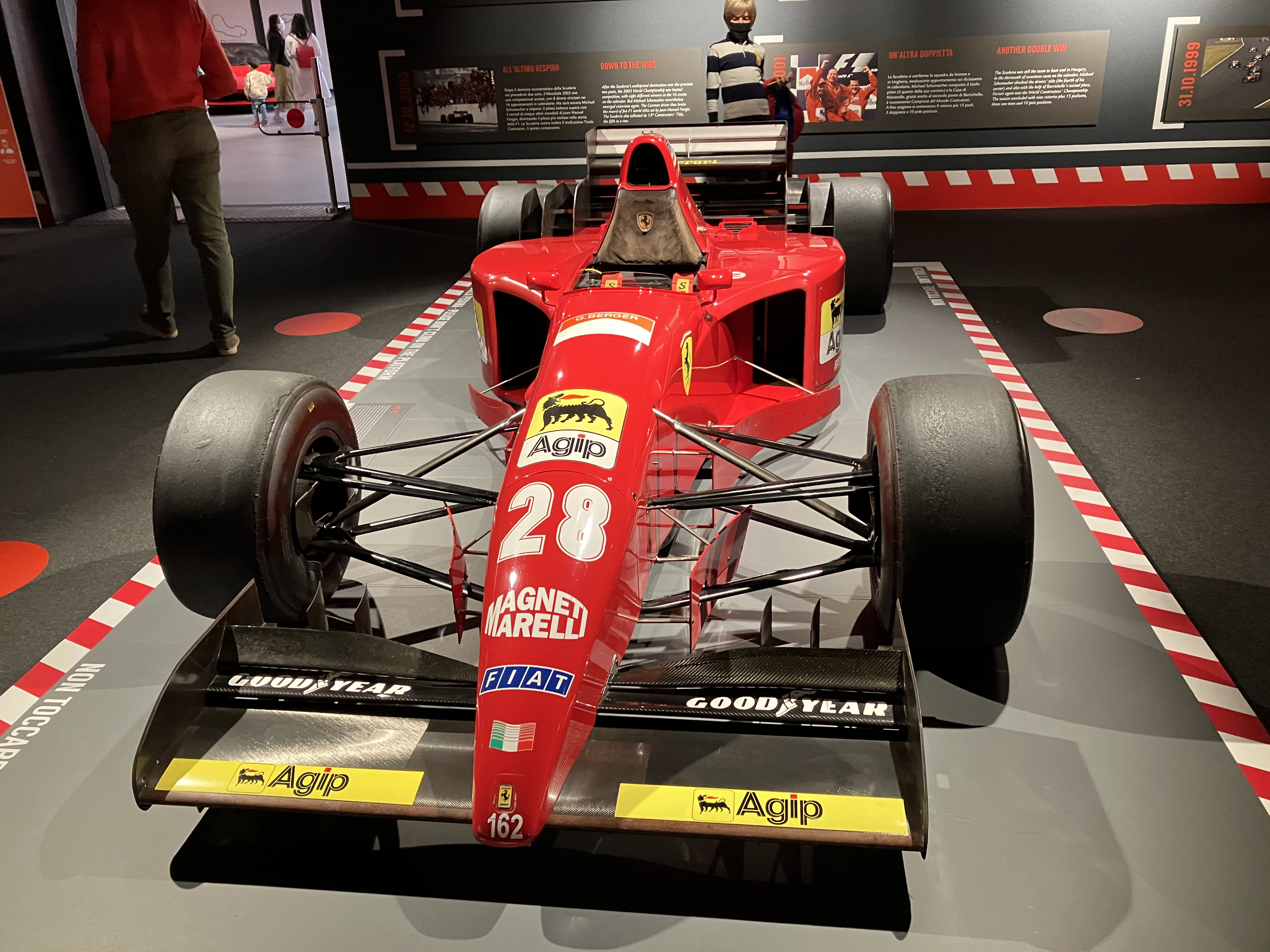

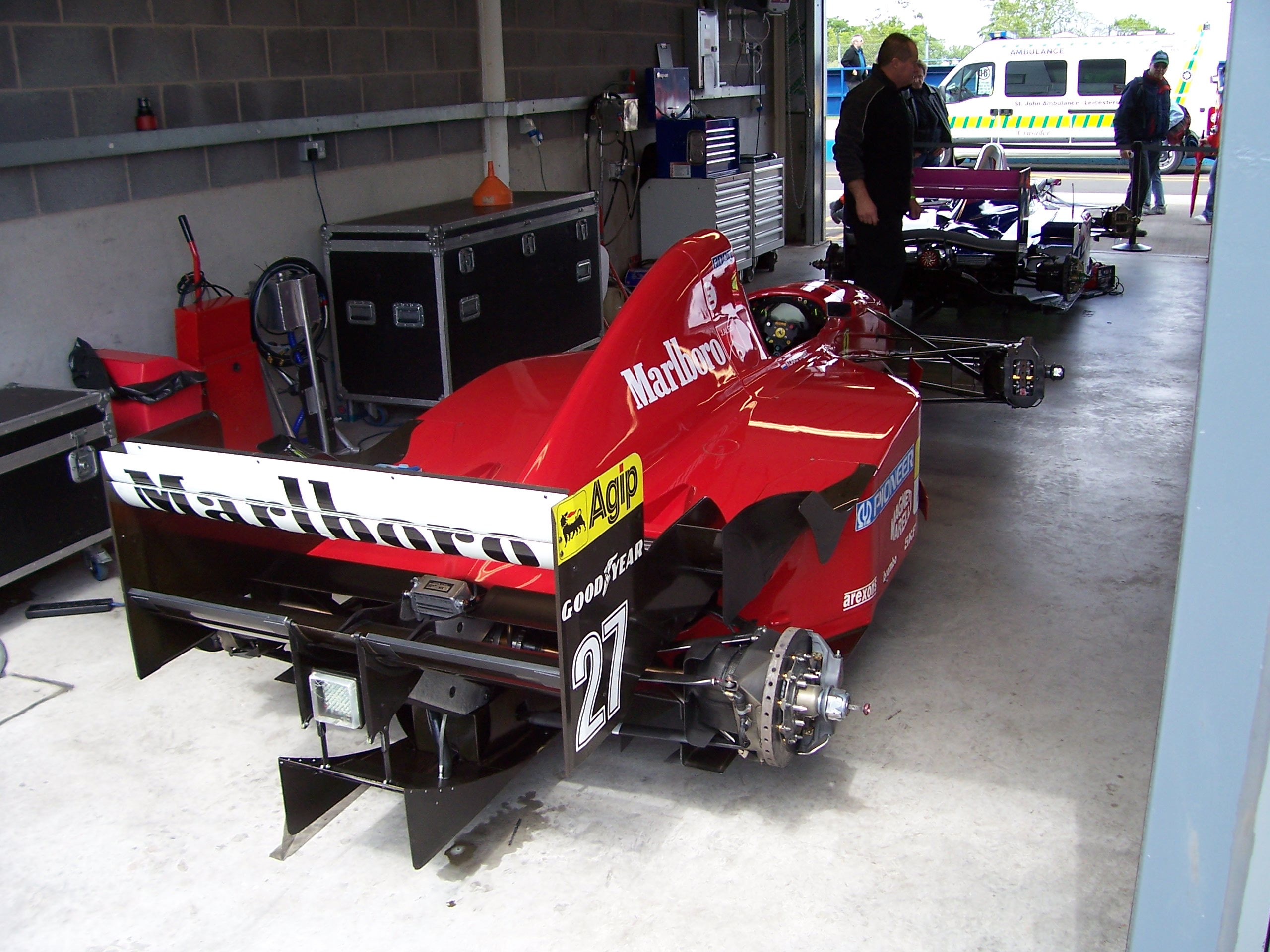
Ferrari 412 T2 at Donington Park in 2007

== Season performance ==
This car proved to be a progressive step ahead compared from the previous year's 412 T1, but due to reliability woes and the continued dominance of the Renault RS7 V10 engine it was still not able to bring Ferrari back into the fight for the title.

Results at the start of the season were promising, with podiums for both drivers as the car was established as a frontrunner. At Imola, Berger started on the front row and went on to set the fastest lap, leading the race before stalling at the pitstops. Jean Alesi won an emotional first race for both driver and chassis at the Canadian Grand Prix, giving Ferrari the lead in the constructors world championship at that point in the season.

At the high speed circuit of Spa at the Belgian Grand Prix, the Ferraris locked out the front row of the grid and hopes were high for a title challenge. However, both cars were out with reliability issues by the halfway point, Alesi having again been leading. The disappointment continued at the Italian Grand Prix, where the Ferraris were running a commanding first and second following the pitstops. However, Berger suffered a bizarre retirement when a TV camera on Alesi's rear wing flew off and destroyed Berger's suspension. Alesi looked set to win his second Grand Prix but subsequently retired with a wheel bearing failure with just 8 laps to go.

Competitiveness waned for the remainder of the season, with the highlight being Alesi's near victory at the Nurburgring, when he came within 3 laps of winning on heavily worn tyres only to be passed by a charging Schumacher on much fresher rubber. The season concluded with the car having scored 73 points in total. This placed Ferrari in third place in the Constructors' standings for 1995.

The 412 T2 was replaced by the Ferrari F310 in 1996.

== Acceleration data ==
According to the June 1995 issue of Quattroruote, the Ferrari 412 T2, as tested against a Fiat Punto 75, Porsche 911 Turbo (993), Top fuel dragster, and a McDonnell Douglas F18C Hornet had the following acceleration data:

0 - 100 kph	2.1 s
1/4 mile	8.5 s @ 168.1 mph (270.5 km/h)

== Legacy ==
The 412 T2 was the last Formula 1 car powered by a V12 engine (as well as the last F1 car to win a race using one), and the last Ferrari Formula One car to run on Agip fuel.

Both Alesi and Berger moved to Benetton for the 1996 season, to be replaced by Michael Schumacher and Eddie Irvine. Schumacher tested with the 412 T2 and declared the car to be "good enough to win a world championship."

== Other ==
The 412 T2 is a playable vehicle in F1 2017 and F1 2018 as part of the classic cars. It also appears in Real Racing 3 as an unlockable vehicle in a carrer event called "Motorfiesta 1".

== Complete Formula One results ==
(key) (results in bold indicate pole position; results in italics indicate fastest lap)

Year	Team	Engine	Tyres	Drivers	1	2	3	4	5	6	7	8	9	10	11	12	13	14	15	16	17	Points	WCC
1995	412 T2	044/1 3.0 V12	**G**		BRA	ARG	SMR	ESP	MON	CAN	FRA	GBR	GER	HUN	BEL	ITA	POR	EUR	PAC	JPN	AUS	**73**	**3rd**
1995	412 T2	044/1 3.0 V12	**G**	(France) Jean Alesi	5	2	2	Ret	Ret	1	5	2	Ret	Ret	Ret	Ret	5	2	5	Ret	Ret	**73**	**3rd**
1995	412 T2	044/1 3.0 V12	**G**	(Austria) Gerhard Berger	3	6	3	3	3	11	12	Ret	3	3	**Ret**	Ret	4	Ret	4	Ret	Ret	**73**	**3rd**
