= Maserati V12 engine =

Overview
- Manufacturer: (Italy) Maserati
- Production: 1951, 1957, 1966–1969

Layout
- Configuration: 60° V12
- Displacement: 2.5–4.5 L (152.6–274.6 cu in)
- Cylinder bore: 52.2–70.4 mm (2.06–2.77 in)
- Piston stroke: 52–64 mm (2.0–2.5 in)
- Valvetrain: 48-valve, DOHC, 3-valves per cylinder to 4-valves per cylinder
- Compression ratio: 10:1-12.0:1

Combustion
- Fuel system: Carburetor / Fuel injection
- Fuel type: Gasoline
- Cooling system: Water-cooled

Output
- Power output: 315–400 hp (235–298 kW; 319–406 PS)
- Torque output: approx. 165–279.5 lb⋅ft (224–379 N⋅m)

Maserati made four naturally-aspirated, V12 racing engines, designed for Formula One, between 1951 and 1969. The first was an experimental O.S.C.A. engine, in accordance with the 4.5 L engine regulations imposed by the FIA for 1951. Their second engine was 250 F1 V12, in accordance with the 2.5 L engine regulations set by the FIA. Their last two V12 engines were customer engines supplied to Cooper, between 1966 and 1969. The Tipo 9 / F1 and Tipo 10 /F1, which were both manufactured to the FIA's 3.0 L engine regulations for 1966. One sports car, a modified version of the Maserati 350S, also used V12 engine, with a 3.5 L (210 cu in) displacement, and produced 335 hp (250 kW).

== 4CLT O.S.C.A. engine ==
For 1951 B. Bira modified his '49-spec 4CLT to accept a more powerful, 4,450 cc (271.6 cu in), naturally aspirated OSCA V12 engine. This engine developed around 300 bhp (224 kW). With it Bira won the Goodwood race early in the season, but in its only World Championship appearance, at the 1951 Spanish Grand Prix, it retired on the first lap.

== 250F F1 V12 engine / Tipo 9/Tipo 10 engine ==
In 1956 three 250F T2 engines first appeared for the works drivers. Developed by Giulio Alfieri, and sometimes using the all-new 315 bhp (235 kW) V12 engine, although it offered little or no real advantage over the older straight-6. It was later developed into the 3-litre V12 that won two races powering the Cooper T81 and T86 from 1966 to 1969, the final "Tipo 9" and "Tipo 10" variant of the engine having three valves and two spark plugs per cylinder.

== Applications ==
=== Formula One cars ===
- Maserati 4CLT
- Maserati 250F
- Cooper T81
- Cooper T86

=== Sports cars ===
- Maserati 350S
