= Claudio Lombardi =

Italian Formula One engineer (1942–2025)

Claudio Lombardi (12 May 1942 – 2 October 2025) was an Italian Formula One engineer, best known for his work as team-manager at the Ferrari team during the early-1990s.

== Life and career ==
Lombardi was born in Alessandria in 1942. He studied mechanical engineering at the University of Bologna. He was soon recruited by the Fiat research center, before designing engines for Lancia, which helped them in the World Rally Championship and in sports car racing. Lombardi became head of department for engineering at Lancia when Cesare Fiorio moved to Ferrari. In 1989 Fiorio invited Lombardi to join him at Ferrari. When Fiorio left the company in 1991, Luca di Montezemolo promoted Lombardi from engineer to team-manager to caretake the team until the arrival of Jean Todt in 1993. In 1993 Lombardi designed the Ferrari 12 cylinder engine. It would score the two final victories for an engine with such configuration at the 1994 German Grand Prix with Gerhard Berger and at the 1995 Canadian Grand Prix with Jean Alesi.

In 1994 Lombardi was moved to the Ferrari GT programme. From 2000 to 2010 he acted as technical consultant for Aprilia, designing the Aprilia RSV4 engine that would give Max Biaggi the Superbike World title in 2010.

Lombardi died in Alessandria on 2 October 2025, at the age of 83.
