= Centenari Mac3 =

- Category: CN
- Constructor: Centenari Racing SRL
- Successor: Centenari MG3

Technical specifications
- Engine: Alfa Romeo 2,959 cc (180.6 cu in) V6 naturally-aspirated mid-engined
- Tyres: Pirelli

Competition history
- Notable entrants: Centenari Racing SRL
- Notable drivers: Xavier Pompidou; Giovanna Amati; Marco Lucchinelli
- Debut: 1998 1000 km of Monza

The Centenari Mac3 was a Le Mans Prototype, originally built by Centenari in 1998 for the CN category of the International Sports Racing Series. It was updated in 2006, and the new version was renamed as the MG3. Both cars used the same naturally-aspirated 3.0 L Alfa Romeo V6 engine. The Mac3, in conjunction with the older M1 model, helped Centenari to take joint-second in the 1998 International Sports Racing Series CN Team's Championship.

== History ==
=== 1998 ===
For 1998, Centenari developed a new car for the International Sports Racing Series (ISRS) – the Mac3 – and the team expanded to a two-car effort, with the older M1 being retained. The team started their season at the 1000 km Monza, which was part of the GT Italian Challenge and the Challenge Endurance Italia, with Loic Depailler, Xavier Pompidou, Giovanna Amati and Marco Lucchinelli driving the new Mac3, and Merzario, Giovanni Li Calzi, Robin Donovan and Fulvio Ballabio driving the older M1. Although the two cars were qualified in seventh and twelfth respectively, neither car had a successful race; the Mac3 didn't make the start, and the M1 retired after 73 laps. The Mac3 did, however, finish sixth in the ISRS season opener at Paul Ricard; both Centenaris were classified in the CN category, and they were the only cars in that category to finish the race. This was followed by a ninth overall finish (second in the CN class) for the Mac3 at Brno. For Misano, Centenari entered three cars; two M1s, and a Mac3. Both M1s retired, but the Mac3 finished twelfth, and fifth in class. At Donington Park, the Mac3 completed too few laps to be classified. Anderstorp saw the Mac3's gearbox fail after 31 laps. Nürburgring saw the Mac3 finish in twelfth place overall; however, this was the second-to-last position in the CN class (the M1, which finished in thirteenth overall, was last in class). At the penultimate round at Le Mans, the Mac3 finished tenth overall and second in class. A Mac3 was then used in the Hockenheim round of the Internationales FRC Rennen by G. Gomez, but was not classified. The Mac3 was not entered in the ISRS season finale at Kyalami. Centenari were classified joint-second in the CN Team's Championship, and eleventh overall, at the end of the ISRS season.

=== 1999-2001 ===
Josef Pfyl and Joa Barbosa drove the Mac3 in multiple events in 1999. Pfyl won twice, at Dijon on 3 April, and at Varano on 2 May; whilst Barbosa won at Dijon on 19 June. Frederico Leone also entered a Mac3 that year, in a race at Hockenheim on 23 October, but did not finish. Pfyl and "Gianfranco" were the main Mac3 drivers in 2000. Pfyl's best finish was second in a race at Gurnigel on 10 September, whilst "Gianfranco" won at Vallelunga on 2 April. Luigi Francucci drove the Mac3 to 16th in a race at Misano on 22 October. Centenari entered João Barbosa, Georg Paulin and Andrea Piccini in the Mac3 at the 6 Hours of Vallelunga, but retired after 53 laps. In 2001, "Gianfranco", Pfyl and Walter Margelli were the car's most regular drivers; "Gianfranco"'s best finish was a fourth at Misano on 8 July, Pfyl's was a second at Dijon on 15 April, whilst Margelli's best finish was fourth at a race held on the Autodromo del Levante on 23 September.

=== 2002-2005 ===
In 2002, the Mac3 was entered in two rounds of the Interserie by Jo Zeller Racing. Classified as a Division 5 car and driven by Pfyl, it won its class (finishing fourth overall) in the first race it was entered in, the first race of the Most weekend, and second in class, seventh overall, in the second race at Most. Jo Zeller Racing entered the car again at the Hockenheimring round of the Interserie, with Pfyl finishing tenth overall (fourth in Group L) in race one, and eighth in race two, third in Group L.

Motori di Carlotta entered the Mac3 at the 6 Hours of Vallelunga in 2005; the car, driven by Filippo Vita, Diego Borgese and Luigi De Luca, qualified in second place overall, but retired from the race just after the two-hour mark, having completed 75 laps.

=== 2006-2007 ===
Centenari Racing entered the 6 Hours of Vallelunga in 2006, with the Mac3 being updated to create the new MG3. The new car featured an Alfa Romeo engine, just like the M1 and Mac3, with Giovanni Mezzasalma and Giovanni Cassibba being employed to drive it. Centenari finished thirteenth overall, and second in the CN4 class, having completed 182 laps in the race.
