= 1998 International Sports Racing Series =

Seasons
- ← 1997 1999 →

The 1998 International Sports Racing Series was the second season of International Sportscar Racing Series (later known as the FIA Sportscar Championship). It was a series for sportscar-style prototypes broken into two classes based on power and weight, called SR1 and SR2, as well as a class of hillclimb-style sportscars, called CN. It began on April 13, 1998, and ended December 6, 1998, after 8 races.

== Schedule ==
Rnd	Race	Circuit	Date
1	(France) Paul Ricard 2 Hours 30 Minutes	Circuit Paul Ricard	April 13
2	(Czech Republic) Brno 2 Hours 30 Minutes	Autodrom Brno Masaryk	May 17
3	(Italy) Giesse ISRS Trophy (2 Hours 30 Minutes)	Misano Circuit	July 4
4	(United Kingdom) RAC Tourist Trophy (2 Hours 30 Minutes)	Donington Park	July 19
5	(Sweden) Anderstorp 2 Hours 30 Minutes	Scandinavian Raceway	August 16
6	(Germany) DMC/ADAC Sportwagen Festival (2 Hours 30 Minutes)	Nürburgring	September 6
7	(France) Le Mans Autumn Cup (2 Hours 30 Minutes)	Bugatti Circuit	September 19
8	(South Africa) Vodacom ISRS (2 Hours 30 Minutes)	Kyalami	December 6

== Season results ==
Rnd	Circuit	SR1 Winning Team	SR2 Winning Team	CN Winning Team	Results
Rnd	Circuit	SR1 Winning Drivers	SR2 Winning Drivers	CN Winning Drivers	Results
1	Paul Ricard	(Switzerland) #27 Horag-Lista Racing	(France) #32 Waterair Sports	(Italy) #41 Centenari Racing SRL	Results
1	Paul Ricard	(Switzerland) Fredy Lienhard (Belgium) Didier Theys	(France) André Cholley (France) Edouard Sezionale (France) Lionel Robert	(Italy) Arturo Merzario (Italy) Fulvio Ballabio (United Kingdom) Robin Donovan	Results
2	Brno	(France) #5 JB Giesse Team Ferrari	None	(Italy) #45 Tampolli Engineering	Results
2	Brno	(France) Emmanuel Collard (Italy) Vincenzo Sospiri		(Italy) Fabio Mancini (Italy) Luca Riccitelli	Results
3	Misano	(France) #5 JB Giesse Team Ferrari	(France) #32 Waterair Sports	(Italy) #44 Tampolli Engineering	Results
3	Misano	(France) Emmanuel Collard (Italy) Vincenzo Sospiri	(France) André Cholley (France) Edouard Sezionale (France) Jean-Claude de Castelli	(Italy) Felice Tedeschi (Italy) Gianluca Giraudi	Results
4	Donington	(France) #5 JB Giesse Team Ferrari	(France) #32 Waterair Sports	(Italy) #45 Tampolli Engineering	Results
4	Donington	(France) Emmanuel Collard (Italy) Vincenzo Sospiri	(France) François Jakubowski (France) Jean-Claude de Castelli	(Italy) Fabio Mancini (Italy) Luca Riccitelli	Results
5	Anderstorp	(France) #5 JB Giesse Team Ferrari	None	(Italy) #45 Tampolli Engineering	Results
5	Anderstorp	(France) Emmanuel Collard (Italy) Vincenzo Sospiri		(Italy) Fabio Mancini (Italy) Luca Riccitelli	Results
6	Nürburgring	(France) #5 JB Giesse Team Ferrari	(France) #32 Waterair Sports	(Italy) #44 Tampolli Engineering	Results
6	Nürburgring	(France) Emmanuel Collard (Italy) Vincenzo Sospiri	(France) Jean-Claude de Castelli (France) François Jakubowski	(Italy) Felice Tedeschi (Italy) Gianluca Giraudi	Results
7	Le Mans	(France) #5 JB Giesse Team Ferrari	(France) #33 Waterair Sports	(Italy) #45 Tampolli Engineering	Results
7	Le Mans	(France) Emmanuel Collard (Italy) Vincenzo Sospiri	(France) André Cholley (France) Pierre Bruneau	(Italy) Fabio Mancini (Italy) Luca Riccitelli	Results
8	Kyalami	(France) #19 Solution F	(France) #33 Waterair Sports	(Italy) #45 Tampolli Engineering	Results
8	Kyalami	(France) Jérôme Policand (South Africa) Gary Formato	(Switzerland) Philippe Favre (France) Didier Bonnet	(Italy) Fabio Mancini (Italy) Luca Riccitelli (Italy) Denny Zardo	Results

== Teams Championship ==
Points are awarded to the top 10 finishers in the order of 20-15-12-10-8-6-4-3-2-1. Only the highest placing car within a team earned points towards the championship. The SportsRacing World Cup was available to all teams that participated, but separate SR2 and CN championships were also held.

=== Overall standings ===
Pos	Team	Car	Engine	Rd 1	Rd 2	Rd 3	Rd 4	Rd 5	Rd 6	Rd 7	Rd 8	Total
1	(France) JB Giesse Team Ferrari	Ferrari 333 SP	Ferrari F310E 4.0L V12		20	20	20	20	20	20		120
2	(Switzerland) Horag-Lista Team	Ferrari 333 SP	Ferrari F310E 4.0L V12	20	8	12	15	15		15		85
3	(France) Solution F	Riley & Scott Mk III	Ford 5.0L V8		10	15			10		20	55
4	(Italy) Autosport Racing	Ferrari 333 SP	Ferrari F310E 4.0L V12	8	3	10	12	8		4		45
5	(Italy) BMW Team Rafanelli	Riley & Scott Mk III	BMW 4.0L V8		15			12	15			42
6=	(Italy) Target 24	Riley & Scott Mk III	Chevrolet 5.0L V8	12	6				8	12		38
6=	(Italy) Tampolli Engineering	Tampolli RTA-98	Alfa Romeo 3.0L V6		4	8	10	4	6	2	4	38
8	(Germany) Repsol Kremer Racing	Kremer K8 Spyder	Porsche 3.0L Turbo Flat-6	15	2	1	2			3	6	29
9	(Monaco) GLV Brums	Ferrari 333 SP	Ferrari F310E 4.0L V12					10		8	8	26
10	(Italy) Siliprandi Racing	Lucchini P1-98	Alfa Romeo 3.0L V8			6	4	3	3			16
11	(United States) Dyson Racing	Riley & Scott Mk III	Ford 5.0L V8								15	15
12	(Italy) Centenari Racing SRL	Centenari M1	Alfa Romeo 3.0L V6	10	2					1		13
13=	(United Kingdom) GTC Motorsport Lanzante	Ferrari 333 SP	Ferrari F310E 4.0L V12		12							12
13=	(France) Waterair Sports	Debora LMP296; Debora LMP297	Cosworth 2.0L I4; BMW 3.0L I6				8		4			12
13=	(United States) Doyle-Risi Racing	Ferrari 333 SP	Ferrari F310E 4.0L V12								12	12
16	(France) Equipe Promotion Racing	Courage C41	Porsche 3.0L Turbo Flat-6				1			10		11
17	(Germany) Agusta Kremer Racing	Kremer K8 Spyder	Porsche 3.0L Turbo Flat-6			2	3		2		3	10
18	(Italy) SCI	Spice SCI	Ford Cosworth 3.5L V8				6	2				8
19=	(France) La Filière	Courage C36	Porsche 3.0L Turbo Flat-6							6		6
19=	(United Kingdom) McNeil Engineering	Lola 981	Judd GV10 3.4L V10; Judd GV4 4.0L V10					6				6
21	(Italy) Cipriani Motorsport	Lucchini P3-96	Alfa Romeo 3.0L V6			3						3
22	(Germany) G4 Team Gebhardt	Gebhardt G4	Audi 2.1L Turbo I5								2	2

=== SR2 standings ===
Pos	Team	Car	Engine	Rd 1	Rd 2	Rd 3	Rd 4	Rd 5	Rd 6	Rd 7	Rd 8	Total
1	(France) Waterair Sports	Debora LMP296; Debora LMP297	Cosworth 2.0L I4; BMW 3.0L I6			20	20		20	20	20	100
2	(United Kingdom) Mark Bailey Racing	MBR 972	Ford 3.0L V6; MG 3.0L V6				15		12			27

=== CN standings ===
Pos	Team	Car	Engine	Rd 1	Rd 2	Rd 3	Rd 4	Rd 5	Rd 6	Rd 7	Rd 8	Total
1	(Italy) Tampolli Engineering	Tampolli RTA-98	Alfa Romeo 3.0L V6		20	20	20	20	20	20	20	140
2=	(Italy) Siliprandi Racing	Lucchini LMP1-98	Alfa Romeo 3.0L V6		10	15	15	15	15	10		80
2=	(Italy) Centenari Racing SRL	Centenari M1	Alfa Romeo 3.0L V6	20	15	8	12		10	15		80
4	(Italy) Cipriani Motorsport	Lucchini P3-96	Alfa Romeo 3.0L V6			10				12		22
5	(Italy) Luigi Taverna	Osella PA20	BMW 3.0L I6			6			12			18
6	(Italy) Osella SRL	Osella PA20	BMW 3.0L I6		8							8
