= Centenari M1 =

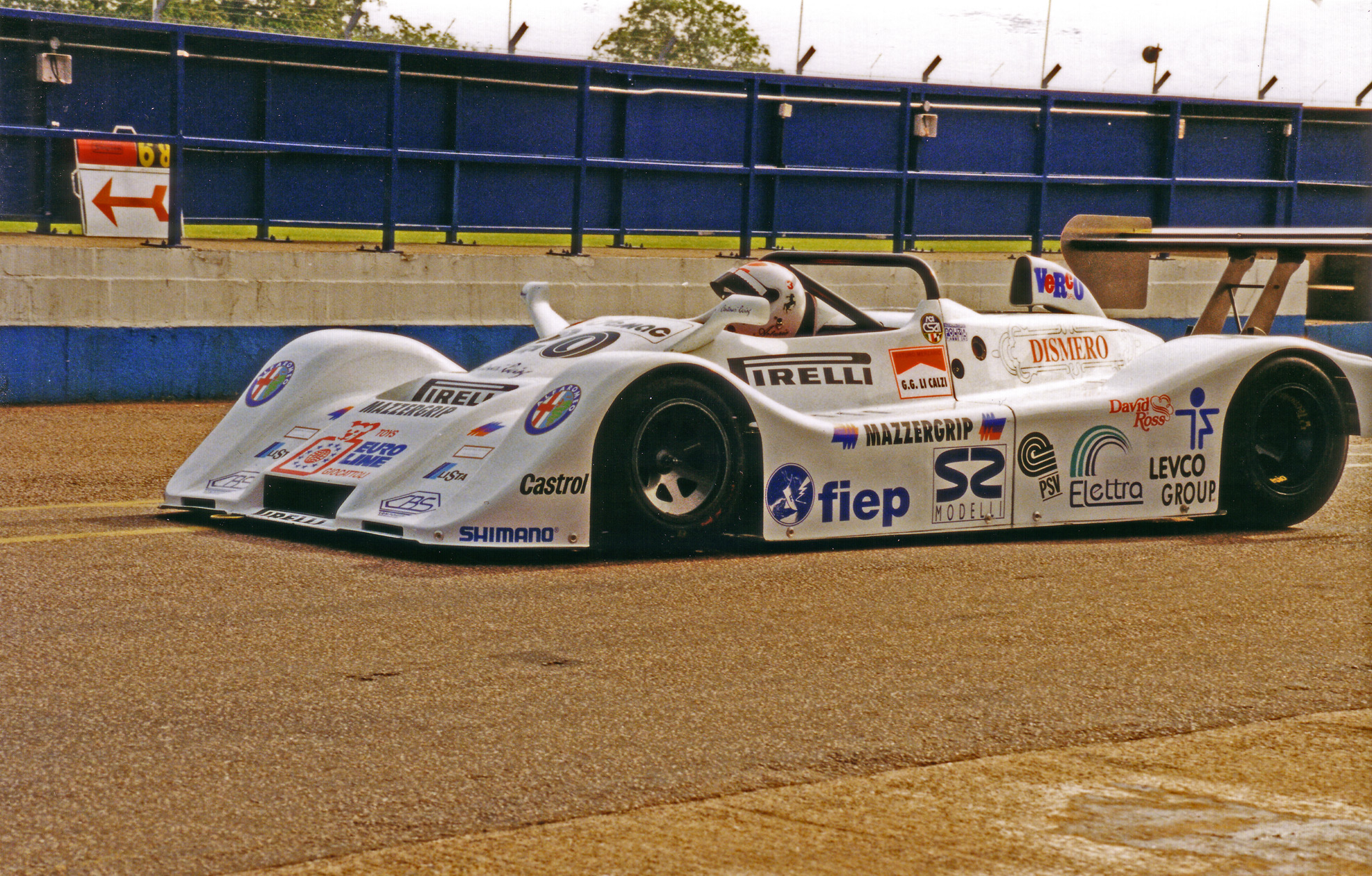
- Category: CN/SR2
- Constructor: Centenari Racing SRL
- Successor: Centenari Mac3

Technical specifications
- Engine: Alfa Romeo 2,959 cc (180.6 cu in) V6 naturally-aspirated mid-engined
- Tyres: Pirelli

Competition history
- Notable entrants: Centenari Racing SRL
- Notable drivers: Arturo Merzario; Robin Donovan; Fulvio Ballabio
- Debut: 1991 Italian Prototype Championship, Enna-Pergusa
Races	Wins
57	6
- Teams' Championships: 0
- Constructors' Championships: 0
- Drivers' Championships: 0

The Centenari M1 was a Le Mans Prototype, originally built by Centenari in 1991 for the Italian Prototype Championship. In 1997 and 1998, it was used in the SR2 and the CN category of the International Sports Racing Series. Two cars are known to have been built.

== History ==
=== National events ===
In 1991, Centenari entered Federico D'Amore and a M1 in several Italian Prototype Championship events. The best result of the season was a third-placed finish at Enna-Pergusa. For 1992, D'Amore left the team, and Stefano Speranza was entered at Monza, but failed to finish. Arturo Merzario was then entered in two races, with his best finish being eighth at Vallelunga. The car was not used again in 1993, but Merzario used the car from 1994 until 1997 in the series. He took the car's first ever victory at Vallelunga in 1995, and he would take four more Italian Prototype Championship victories in the car. The team started their 1998 season at the 1000 km Monza, which was part of the GT Italian Challenge and the Challenge Endurance Italia, with Merzario, Giovanni Li Calzi, Robin Donovan and Fulvio Ballabio driving the M1. Although the car was qualified in twelfth, it did not have a successful race, as it was retired after 73 laps.

=== International Sports Racing Series ===
In 1997, Centenari entered the new International Sports Racing Series (ISRS), with the M1. The M1 featured an Alfa Romeo-sourced 3-litre V6 engine, and was classified as a SR2 car. The team made its debut in the season opener at Donington Park, with Merzario and Giovanni Li Calzi hired as drivers, and won their class at the first attempt; as the only other SR2 class entry, a Didier Bonnet Racing-entered Debora LMP297-BMW, retired from the event. Although they retired from the following round at Zolder, having entered under the "Symbol Team" banner, they took an overall win at Brno (competing in the CN class as no other SR1 or SR2 entries were present) for the only time in the team's history. The entry for the final race at Jarama was made under the Centenari name once more, and the team took the SR2 class victory, and finished second overall.

For 1998, a new car, the Centenari Mac3, was developed, and the team expanded to a two-car effort, with the M1 being retained. In the ISRS season opener at Paul Ricard, the M1 finished fourth, being classified in the CN category; both the M1 and the Mac3 were the only cars in that category to finish the race. This was followed by a tenth overall finish (third in the CN class) for the M1 at Brno. For Misano, Centenari entered three cars; two M1s, and a Mac3; however, both M1s retired. At Donington Park, only one of the M1s was classified as finishing, in last place overall, as the other M1 did not start the race. Anderstorp once more saw only one M1 finish, in last place overall, as the other M1's differential failed after a single lap. At the Nürburgring, once again a single M1 finished, in thirteenth overall; however, this meant that the car was the last finisher in the CN class. At the penultimate round at Le Mans, one of the M1's engines expired before it completed a lap, and the other experienced an engine failure after 30 laps. A single M1 was the only Centenari entry in the season finale at Kyalami; however, it retired with clutch issues after 32 laps. Centenari were classified joint-second in the CN Team's Championship, and eleventh overall, at the end of the season. That proved to be the car's last race.
