= 1997 International Sports Racing Series Jarama =

Layout of the Jarama circuit

The 1997 Gran Premio Repsol Sport Prototipos was the fourth and final round of the 1997 International Sports Racing Series season. It took place at Circuito Permanente del Jarama, Spain on November 9, 1997.

== Official results ==
Class winners in bold.

Pos	Class	No	Team	Drivers	Chassis	Tyre	Laps
Pos	Class	No	Team	Drivers	Engine	Tyre	Laps
1	**SR1**	**4**	**(France) Courage Compétition**	**(France) Jérôme Policand (France) Didier Cottaz**	**Courage C41**	**MI**	**77**
1	**SR1**	**4**	**(France) Courage Compétition**	**(France) Jérôme Policand (France) Didier Cottaz**	**Porsche Type-935 3.0L Turbo Flat-6**	**MI**	**77**
2	**SR2**	**20**	**(Italy) Symbol Team**	**(Italy) Arturo Merzario (United Kingdom) Robin Donovan**	**Centenari M1**	**P**	**75**
2	**SR2**	**20**	**(Italy) Symbol Team**	**(Italy) Arturo Merzario (United Kingdom) Robin Donovan**	**Alfa Romeo 3.0L V6**	**P**	**75**
3	SR1	1	(Germany) Porsche Kremer Racing	(France) Christophe Bouchut (Sweden) Carl Rosenblad	Kremer K8 Spyder	**G**	74
3	SR1	1	(Germany) Porsche Kremer Racing	(France) Christophe Bouchut (Sweden) Carl Rosenblad	Porsche Type-935 3.0L Turbo Flat-6	**G**	74
4	SR1	17	(France) Didier Bonnet Racing	(Belgium) Hervé Regout (France) Bruno Bazaud	Debora LMP296	**MI**	71
4	SR1	17	(France) Didier Bonnet Racing	(Belgium) Hervé Regout (France) Bruno Bazaud	Ford Cosworth 2.0L Turbo I4	**MI**	71
5	SR2	18	(France) Didier Bonnet Racing	(France) Patrice Roussel (France) Daniel Boccard	Debora LMP297	**MI**	71
5	SR2	18	(France) Didier Bonnet Racing	(France) Patrice Roussel (France) Daniel Boccard	BMW 3.0L I6	**MI**	71
6	SR1	3	(France) Courage Compétition	(France) Jean-François Yvon (France) Jean-Louis Ricci	Courage C36	**MI**	71
6	SR1	3	(France) Courage Compétition	(France) Jean-François Yvon (France) Jean-Louis Ricci	Porsche Type-935 3.0L Turbo Flat-6	**MI**	71
7	SR1	2	(Germany) Porsche Kremer Racing	(Spain) Alfonso de Orleans (Spain) Tomás Saldaña	Kremer K8 Spyder	**G**	71
7	SR1	2	(Germany) Porsche Kremer Racing	(Spain) Alfonso de Orleans (Spain) Tomás Saldaña	Porsche Type-935 3.0L Turbo Flat-6	**G**	71
8	SR2	22	(United Kingdom) Mark Bailey Racing	(United Kingdom) Barry Shaw (United Kingdom) Mike Millard	MBR 972	?	70
8	SR2	22	(United Kingdom) Mark Bailey Racing	(United Kingdom) Barry Shaw (United Kingdom) Mike Millard	Ford Cosworth 3.0L V6	?	70
DNF	SR1	15	(Italy) Team SCI	(Italy) Ranieri Randaccio (Canada) Robbie Stirling	Spice SCI	?	55
DNF	SR1	15	(Italy) Team SCI	(Italy) Ranieri Randaccio (Canada) Robbie Stirling	Ferrari 3.4L V8	?	55
DNF	SR1	6	(Switzerland) Horag Hotz Racing	(Switzerland) Fredy Lienhard (Belgium) Didier Theys	Ferrari 333 SP	**Y**	0
DNF	SR1	6	(Switzerland) Horag Hotz Racing	(Switzerland) Fredy Lienhard (Belgium) Didier Theys	Ferrari F310E 4.0L V12	**Y**	0

== Statistics ==
- Pole Position: 1:28.622 - Didier Cottaz (#4 Courage C41-Porsche)
- Fastest Lap: 1:29.472 - Jérôme Policand (#4 Courage C41-Porsche)

FIA Sportscar Championship
Previous race: 1997 FIA Sportscar Championship Brno	1997 season	Next race: None
