= 1997 International Sports Racing Series Zolder =

Automobile race in Belgium in 1997

Layout of the Circuit Zolder (1986-2001)

The 1997 European Historic Grand Prix was the second round of the 1997 International Sports Racing Series season. It took place at Circuit Zolder, Belgium for a length of one hour and forty-five minutes on August 3, 1997.

== Official results ==
Class winners in bold.

Pos	Class	No	Team	Drivers	Chassis	Tyre	Laps
Pos	Class	No	Team	Drivers	Engine	Tyre	Laps
1	**SR1**	**6**	**(Switzerland) Horag Hotz Racing**	**(Switzerland) Fredy Lienhard (Belgium) Didier Theys**	**Ferrari 333 SP**	Y	**47**
1	**SR1**	**6**	**(Switzerland) Horag Hotz Racing**	**(Switzerland) Fredy Lienhard (Belgium) Didier Theys**	**Ferrari F310E 4.0L V12**	Y	**47**
2	SR1	4	(France) Courage Compétition	(France) Jérôme Policand (France) Didier Cottaz	Courage C41	MI	47
2	SR1	4	(France) Courage Compétition	(France) Jérôme Policand (France) Didier Cottaz	Porsche Type-935 3.0L Turbo Flat-6	MI	47
3	SR1	5	(France) Elf La Filière	(France) Henri Pescarolo (France) Emmanuel Clérico	Courage C36	MI	46
3	SR1	5	(France) Elf La Filière	(France) Henri Pescarolo (France) Emmanuel Clérico	Porsche Type-935 3.0L Turbo Flat-6	MI	46
4	SR1	3	(France) Courage Compétition	(Sweden) Fredrik Ekblom (France) Jérôme Policand	Courage C36	MI	46
4	SR1	3	(France) Courage Compétition	(Sweden) Fredrik Ekblom (France) Jérôme Policand	Porsche 3.0L Twin-Turbo I4	MI	46
DNF	SR2	18	(France) Didier Bonnet Racing	(France) David Dussau (Belgium) Bernard de Dryver	Debora LMP297	MI	39
DNF	SR2	18	(France) Didier Bonnet Racing	(France) David Dussau (Belgium) Bernard de Dryver	BMW 3.0L I6	MI	39
DNF	SR2	20	(Italy) Symbol Team	(Italy) Arturo Merzario (Italy) Giovanni Li Calzi	Centenari M1	P	33
DNF	SR2	20	(Italy) Symbol Team	(Italy) Arturo Merzario (Italy) Giovanni Li Calzi	Alfa Romeo 3.0L V6	P	33
DNF	SR1	8	(France) Pilot Racing	(France) Michel Ferté (Spain) Adrian Campos	Ferrari 333 SP	D	22
DNF	SR1	8	(France) Pilot Racing	(France) Michel Ferté (Spain) Adrian Campos	Ferrari F310E 4.0L V12	D	22
DNS	SR2	17	(France) Didier Bonnet Racing	(France) Didier Bonnet (France) Jacques Chevallier	Debora LMP296	MI	0
DNS	SR2	17	(France) Didier Bonnet Racing	(France) Didier Bonnet (France) Jacques Chevallier	Ford Cosworth 2.0L Turbo I4	MI	0

FIA Sportscar Championship
Previous race: 1997 FIA Sportscar Championship Donington	1997 season	Next race: 1997 FIA Sportscar Championship Brno
