= Centenari =

Italian racing team

Centenari Racing SRL, usually referred to as Centenari, was an Italian racing team and chassis constructor company based in Italy, predominantly building sports prototypes. The team were active in international events between 1997 and 2006, having started off in national events in 1991.

== Racing history ==
=== Early history ===
In 1991, Centenari built the M1, and entered Federico D'Amore in several Italian Prototype Championship events that year. The best result of the season was a third-placed finish at Enna-Pergusa. For 1992, D'Amore left the team, and Stefano Speranza was entered at Monza, but failed to finish. Arturo Merzario was then entered in two races, with his best finish being eighth at Vallelunga. The car was not used again in 1993, but Merzario used the car from 1994 until 1997 in the series. He took the car's first ever victory at Vallelunga in 1995, and he would take four more Italian Prototype Championship victories in the car.

=== International Sports Racing Series ===
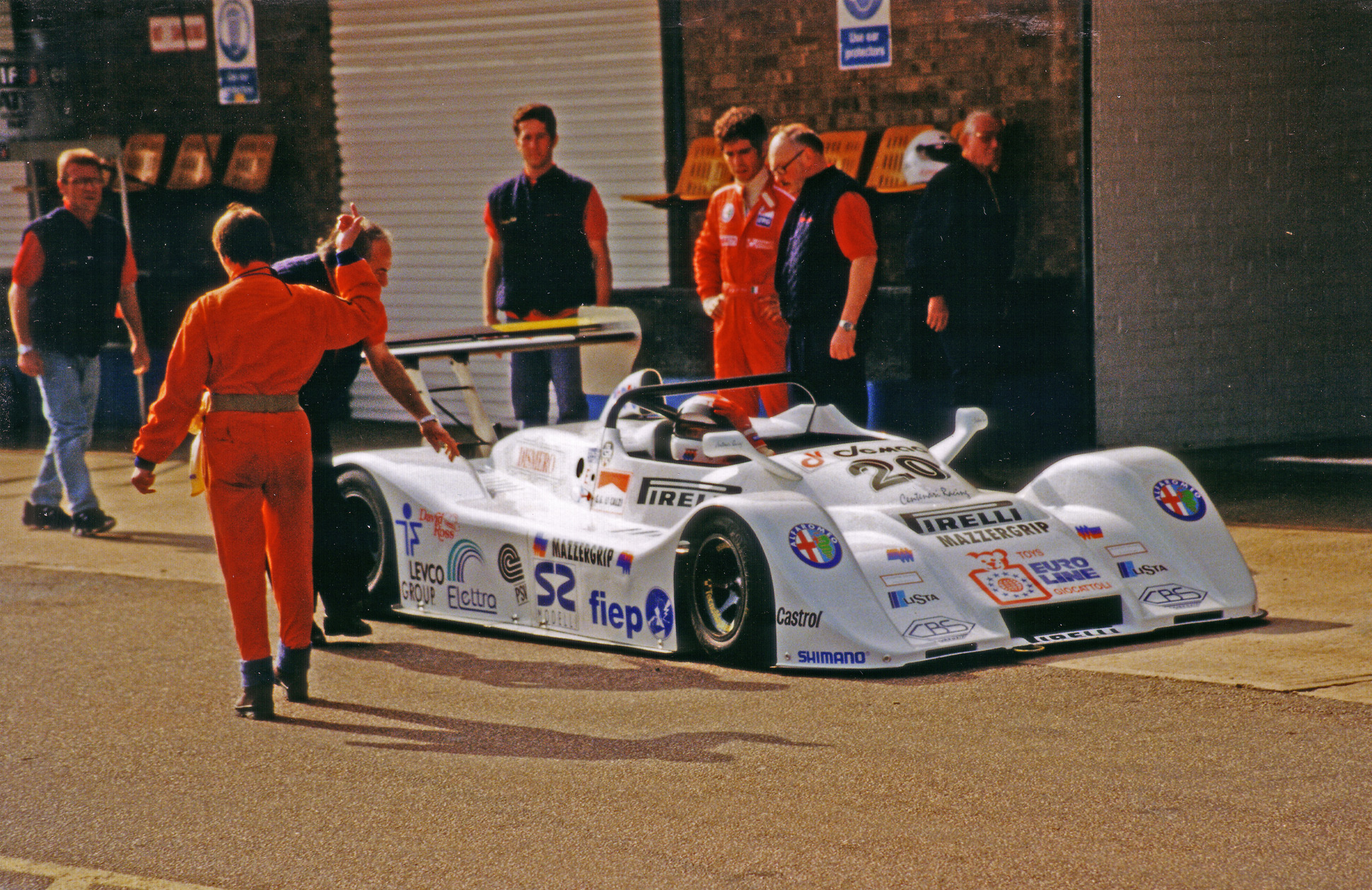
Arturo Merzario, driving the Centenari M1-Alfa Romeo at Donington Park, 5 July 1997

In 1997, Centenari entered the new International Sports Racing Series (ISRS), using their own Centenari M1 chassis. This featured an Alfa Romeo-sourced 3-litre V6 engine, and was classified as a SR2 car. The team made its debut in the season opener at Donington Park, with Merzario and Giovanni Li Calzi hired as drivers, and won their class at the first attempt; as the only other SR2 class entry, a Didier Bonnet Racing-entered Debora LMP297-BMW, retired from the event. Although they retired from the following round at Zolder, having entered under the "Symbol Team" banner, they took an overall win at Brno (competing in the CN class as no other SR1 or SR2 entries were present) for the only time in the team's history. The entry for the final race at Jarama was made under the Centenari name once more, and the team took the SR2 class victory, and finished second overall.

For 1998, a new car, the Centenari Mac3, was developed, and the team expanded to a two-car effort, with the M1 being retained. The team started their season at the 1000 km Monza, which was part of the GT Italian Challenge and the Challenge Endurance Italia, with Loic Depailler, Xavier Pompidou, Giovanna Amati and Marco Lucchinelli driving the new Mac3, and Merzario, Giovanni Li Calzi, Robin Donovan and Fulvio Ballabio driving the older M1. Although the two cars were qualified in seventh and twelfth respectively, neither car had a successful race; the Mac3 didn't make the start, and the M1 retired after 73 laps. Both cars finished the ISRS season opener at Paul Ricard, with the M1 finishing fourth, and the Mac3 finishing sixth; both cars were classified in the CN category, and they were the only cars in that category to finish the race. This was followed by a ninth and tenth overall finish (second and third in the CN class) for the Mac3 and M1 at Brno. For Misano, Centenari entered three cars; two M1s, and a Mac3. Both M1s retired, but the Mac3 finished twelfth, and fifth in class. At Donington Park, only one of the M1s was classified as finishing, in last place overall; the other M1 did not start the race, and the Mac3 completed too few laps to be classified. Anderstorp once more saw only one M1 finish, in last place overall; the Mac3's gearbox failed after 31 laps, and the other M1's differential failed after a single lap. Nürburgring saw a small improvement; the Mac3 and one M1 both finished, in twelfth and thirteenth overall; however, these were the bottom positions in the CN class. At the penultimate round at Le Mans, the Mac3 finished tenth overall and second in class, whilst one of the M1's engines expired before it completed a lap, and the other experienced an engine failure after 30 laps. A single M1 was the only entry in the season finale at Kyalami; however, it retired with clutch issues after 32 laps. Centenari were classified joint-second in the CN Team's Championship, and eleventh overall, at the end of the season.

=== Later history ===
Although the team did not lodge any international entries in 1999, the team returned to competitive racing in 2000, entering João Barbosa, Georg Paulin and Andrea Piccini in the Mac3 at the 6 Hours of Vallelunga, but retired after 53 laps. In 2002, the Mac3 was entered in two rounds of the Interserie by Jo Zeller Racing. Classified as a Division 5 car and driven by Josef Pfyl, it won its class (finishing fourth overall) in the first race it was entered in, the first race of the Most weekend, and second in class, seventh overall, in the second race at Most. Jo Zeller Racing entered the car again at the Hockenheimring round of the Interserie, with Pfyl finishing tenth overall (fourth in Group L) in race one, and eighth in race two, third in Group L. The Mac3 was then left unused for three years, before Motori di Carlotta entered it at the 6 Hours of Vallelunga in 2005; the car, driven by Filippo Vita, Diego Borgese and Luigi De Luca, qualified in second place overall, but retired from the race just after the two-hour mark, having completed 75 laps.

After an absence from racing of six years, Centenari Racing entered the 6 Hours of Vallelunga in 2006, with a new Centenari MG3 car. The new car featured an Alfa Romeo engine, just like the M1 and Mac3, with Giovanni Mezzasalma and Giovanni Cassibba being employed to drive it. Centenari finished thirteenth overall, and second in the CN4 class, having completed 182 laps in the race. However, neither the MG3, nor the older Mac3 or M1 cars, have been used since in international events.

== Cars ==
- Centenari M1 – used in the 1997 and 1998 International Sports Racing Series.
- Centenari Mac3 – used in 1998 in the International Sports Racing series, the 2000 and 2005 6 Hours of Vallelunga, and two rounds of the 2002 Interserie.
- Centenari MG3 – used in the 2006 6 Hours of Vallelunga.
