= 1998 Petit Le Mans =

Sportscar endurance race in Georgia, US

The Track map of Road Atlanta

The 1998 Petit Le Mans was a sportscar race for the 1998 IMSA GT Championship season, then known as the Professional SportsCar Racing series. It also served as a prelude to the first American Le Mans Series race held at Sebring in 1999. Don Panoz's American Le Mans Series was developed with the backing of the Automobile Club de l'Ouest (ACO), the ruling body of the 24 Hours of Le Mans. It took place at the Road Atlanta race track near Braselton, Georgia on October 11, 1998.

== Development ==
Following the demise of the World Sportscar Championship in 1992, sportscar racing was left without a major worldwide series in which to compete. The 24 Hours of Le Mans remained a remnant, still competed by a large number of sportscars, but mostly on a single race basis. Various sportscar leagues had sprung up since the WSC's demise, including the International Motor Sports Association's replacement for their Camel GTP series, the Prototype SportsCar Racing series. In Europe, two series were also developed, the FIA Sportscar Championship and the FIA GT Championship, although they were not combined like IMSA's series.

The Automobile Club de l'Ouest, wanting to create a new worldwide series, made an agreement with Don Panoz, owner of the Road Atlanta racing course. The ACO would agree to lend the Le Mans name out to Panoz for the creation of an event called the Petit Le Mans (French for little Le Mans). The race would be similar to the 12 Hours of Sebring, in that it did not run a full 24 hours like Le Mans. Instead, the race would be 10 hours or 1,000 miles (1,600 km), whichever came first. The series would become an experiment for the ACO, in which if enough teams showed interest in Petit Le Mans, the ACO would look into developing a series around the same formula. In order to help drive interest, the ACO promised that the winners of Petit Le Mans would earn automatic invitations to the 24 Hours of Le Mans without having to apply or earn favor with the ACO. This custom continues to be utilized in the Petit Le Mans, despite American Le Mans Series champions also receiving invites.

IMSA, which normally ran at Road Atlanta during their seasons, agreed to allow a joint race for their series and the 24 Hours of Le Mans competitors. However, each series ran slightly different formulas for their competitors, thus forcing the organizers to create seven different classes. LMP1, LMGT1, and LMGT2 for the ACO compliant cars, and WSC, GT1, GT2, and GT3 for IMSA's competitors. Even though both organizers used the GT1 and GT2 names the classes were not actually the same, which is why the ACO classes are preceded by LM.

== Official results ==
Class winners are marked in bold.

Pos	Class	No	Team	Drivers	Chassis	Tyre	Laps
Pos	Class	No	Team	Drivers	Engine	Tyre	Laps
1	**LMP1**	**7**	**(United States) Doyle-Risi Racing**	**(Belgium) Eric van de Poele** **(South Africa) Wayne Taylor** **(France) Emmanuel Collard**	**Ferrari 333 SP**	**P**	**391**
1	**LMP1**	**7**	**(United States) Doyle-Risi Racing**	**(Belgium) Eric van de Poele** **(South Africa) Wayne Taylor** **(France) Emmanuel Collard**	**Ferrari F310E 4.0 L V12**	**P**	**391**
2	LMP1	77	(Germany) Porsche AG (Germany) Joest Racing	(Italy) Michele Alboreto (Sweden) Stefan Johansson (Germany) Jörg Müller	Porsche LMP1-98	**M**	391
2	LMP1	77	(Germany) Porsche AG (Germany) Joest Racing	(Italy) Michele Alboreto (Sweden) Stefan Johansson (Germany) Jörg Müller	Porsche Type-935 3.2 L Turbo Flat-6	**M**	391
3	**LMGT1**	**38**	**(United States) Champion Motors**	**(Belgium) Thierry Boutsen** **(France) Bob Wollek** **(Germany) Ralf Kelleners**	**Porsche 911 GT1 Evo**	**M**	**381**
3	**LMGT1**	**38**	**(United States) Champion Motors**	**(Belgium) Thierry Boutsen** **(France) Bob Wollek** **(Germany) Ralf Kelleners**	**Porsche 9R1 3.2 L Turbo Flat-6**	**M**	**381**
4	**WSC**	**8**	**(United States) Transatlantic Racing Services**	**(United States) Butch Leitzinger** **(United States) Scott Schubot** **(United States) Henry Camferdam**	**Riley & Scott Mk III**	**D**	**378**
4	**WSC**	**8**	**(United States) Transatlantic Racing Services**	**(United States) Butch Leitzinger** **(United States) Scott Schubot** **(United States) Henry Camferdam**	**Ford 5.0 L V8**	**D**	**378**
5	WSC	88	(United States) Dollahite Racing	(United States) Bill Dollahite (United States) Mike Davies (United States) Anthony Lazzaro	Ferrari 333 SP	**Y**	365
5	WSC	88	(United States) Dollahite Racing	(United States) Bill Dollahite (United States) Mike Davies (United States) Anthony Lazzaro	Ferrari F310E 4.0 L V12	**Y**	365
6	LMP1	63	(Japan) AutoExe Motorsports (United States) Downing Atlanta	(Japan) Yojiro Terada (United States) Jim Downing (United States) Howard Katz	AutoExe AE99 (Kudzu)	**G**	349
6	LMP1	63	(Japan) AutoExe Motorsports (United States) Downing Atlanta	(Japan) Yojiro Terada (United States) Jim Downing (United States) Howard Katz	Mazda 2.6 L 4-Rotor	**G**	349
7	**LMGT2**	**81**	**(Germany) Freisinger Motorsport**	**(France) Michel Ligonnet** **(United States) Lance Stewart**	**Porsche 911 GT2**	**P**	**337**
7	**LMGT2**	**81**	**(Germany) Freisinger Motorsport**	**(France) Michel Ligonnet** **(United States) Lance Stewart**	**Porsche 3.6 L Turbo Flat-6**	**P**	**337**
8	**GT1**	**4**	**(United States) Panoz Motorsports**	**(United States) Scott Pruett** **(France) Éric Bernard** **(United Kingdom) Andy Wallace** **(Australia) David Brabham**	**Panoz Esperante GTR-1**	**M**	**335**
8	**GT1**	**4**	**(United States) Panoz Motorsports**	**(United States) Scott Pruett** **(France) Éric Bernard** **(United Kingdom) Andy Wallace** **(Australia) David Brabham**	**Ford (Roush) 6.0 L V8**	**M**	**335**
9	**GT3**	**76**	**(United States) Team A.R.E.**	**(United States) Peter Argetsinger** **(United States) Richard Polidori** **(Italy) Angelo Cilli**	**Porsche 911 Carrera RSR**	**Y**	**335**
9	**GT3**	**76**	**(United States) Team A.R.E.**	**(United States) Peter Argetsinger** **(United States) Richard Polidori** **(Italy) Angelo Cilli**	**Porsche 3.8 L Flat-6**	**Y**	**335**
10	GT3	6	(United States) Prototype Technology Group	(Canada) Ross Bentley (United States) Darren Law (United States) Jeff Schafer (Australia) David Besnard	BMW M3	**Y**	328
10	GT3	6	(United States) Prototype Technology Group	(Canada) Ross Bentley (United States) Darren Law (United States) Jeff Schafer (Australia) David Besnard	BMW S52 3.2 L I6	**Y**	328
11	LMGT2	72	(Germany) Konrad Motorsport	(Austria) Franz Konrad (Netherlands) Jan Lammers	Porsche 911 GT2	**D**	322
11	LMGT2	72	(Germany) Konrad Motorsport	(Austria) Franz Konrad (Netherlands) Jan Lammers	Porsche 3.6 L Turbo Flat-6	**D**	322
12	LMGT1	07	(United States) Panoz Motorsports	(United States) Doc Bundy (Denmark) John Nielsen (France) Christophe Tinseau	Panoz Esperante GTR-1 Q9	**M**	317
12	LMGT1	07	(United States) Panoz Motorsports	(United States) Doc Bundy (Denmark) John Nielsen (France) Christophe Tinseau	Ford (Roush) 6.0 L V8; Zytek Hybrid Electric	**M**	317
13	**GT2**	**04**	**(United States) CJ Motorsport**	**(United States) John Morton** **(Canada) Ron Fellows** **(Canada) John Graham**	**Porsche 911 GT2**	**P**	**311**
13	**GT2**	**04**	**(United States) CJ Motorsport**	**(United States) John Morton** **(Canada) Ron Fellows** **(Canada) John Graham**	**Porsche 3.6 L Turbo Flat-6**	**P**	**311**
14	LMGT2	00	(France) Larbre Compétition	(France) Patrice Goueslard (France) Stéphane Ortelli (France) Jack Leconte	Porsche 911 GT2	**M**	311
14	LMGT2	00	(France) Larbre Compétition	(France) Patrice Goueslard (France) Stéphane Ortelli (France) Jack Leconte	Porsche 3.6 L Turbo Flat-6	**M**	311
15	GT2	75	(United States) Pettit Racing	(United States) Cameron Worth (United States) Scott Sansone	Mazda RX-7	?	294
15	GT2	75	(United States) Pettit Racing	(United States) Cameron Worth (United States) Scott Sansone	Mazda 2.0 L 3-Rotor	?	294
16	GT3	1	(United States) Prototype Technology Group	(United States) Peter Cunningham (United States) Brian Simo (United States) Terry Borcheller (Costa Rica) Javier Quiros	BMW M3	**Y**	289
16	GT3	1	(United States) Prototype Technology Group	(United States) Peter Cunningham (United States) Brian Simo (United States) Terry Borcheller (Costa Rica) Javier Quiros	BMW S52 3.2 L I6	**Y**	289
17 DNF	GT3	10	(United States) Prototype Technology Group	(United States) Bill Auberlen (United States) Mark Simo (United Kingdom) Andy Pilgrim	BMW M3	**Y**	281
17 DNF	GT3	10	(United States) Prototype Technology Group	(United States) Bill Auberlen (United States) Mark Simo (United Kingdom) Andy Pilgrim	BMW S52 3.2 L I6	**Y**	281
18 DNF	WSC	39	(United States) Matthews-Colucci Racing	(United States) David Murry (United States) Jim Matthews (United States) Hurley Haywood	Riley & Scott Mk III	**P**	273
18 DNF	WSC	39	(United States) Matthews-Colucci Racing	(United States) David Murry (United States) Jim Matthews (United States) Hurley Haywood	Ford 5.0 L V8	**P**	273
19	GT3	86	(United States) G&W Motorsport	(United States) Steve Marshall (United States) Danny Marshall (Canada) Sylvain Tremblay	Porsche 911 Carrera RSR	?	271
19	GT3	86	(United States) G&W Motorsport	(United States) Steve Marshall (United States) Danny Marshall (Canada) Sylvain Tremblay	Porsche 3.8 L Flat-6	?	271
20 DNF	LMGT1	26	(Germany) Porsche AG	(United Kingdom) Allan McNish (Germany) Uwe Alzen (France) Yannick Dalmas	Porsche 911 GT1-98	**M**	235
20 DNF	LMGT1	26	(Germany) Porsche AG	(United Kingdom) Allan McNish (Germany) Uwe Alzen (France) Yannick Dalmas	Porsche 3.2 L Turbo Flat-6	**M**	235
21 DNF	WSC	28	(United States) Intersport Racing	(United States) Jon Field (United States) Jeret Schroeder (United States) Joaquin DeSoto (United States) John Mirro	Riley & Scott Mk III	**G**	229
21 DNF	WSC	28	(United States) Intersport Racing	(United States) Jon Field (United States) Jeret Schroeder (United States) Joaquin DeSoto (United States) John Mirro	Ford 5.0 L V8	**G**	229
22 DNF	LMGT2	73	(Germany) Konrad Motorsport	(Italy) Angelo Zadra (United States) Peter Kitchak (United States) Charles Slater	Porsche 911 GT2	**D**	157
22 DNF	LMGT2	73	(Germany) Konrad Motorsport	(Italy) Angelo Zadra (United States) Peter Kitchak (United States) Charles Slater	Porsche 3.6 L Turbo Flat-6	**D**	157
23 DNF	GT3	12	(United States) T.C. Kline	(United States) Randy Pobst (United States) Pete Halsmer (United States) Shane Lewis	BMW M3	?	96
23 DNF	GT3	12	(United States) T.C. Kline	(United States) Randy Pobst (United States) Pete Halsmer (United States) Shane Lewis	BMW S52 3.2 L I6	?	96
24 DNF	GT3	96	Team Ecuador	(Ecuador) Henry Taleb (Ecuador) Xavier Collado (New Zealand) Rob Wilson	Nissan 240SX	**Y**	63
24 DNF	GT3	96	Team Ecuador	(Ecuador) Henry Taleb (Ecuador) Xavier Collado (New Zealand) Rob Wilson	Nissan KA24DE 2.4 L I4	**Y**	63
25 DNF	WSC	27	(United States) Doran Enterprises	(Belgium) Didier Theys (Switzerland) Fredy Lienhard (Italy) Mauro Baldi	Ferrari 333 SP	**Y**	59
25 DNF	WSC	27	(United States) Doran Enterprises	(Belgium) Didier Theys (Switzerland) Fredy Lienhard (Italy) Mauro Baldi	Ferrari F310E 4.0 L V12	**Y**	59
26 DNF	GT2	68	(United States) Charles Coker Jr.	(United States) Charles Coker Jr. (United States) Joe Varde (United States) Joe Foster (United States) Dave White	Porsche 968 Turbo RS	**P**	50
26 DNF	GT2	68	(United States) Charles Coker Jr.	(United States) Charles Coker Jr. (United States) Joe Varde (United States) Joe Foster (United States) Dave White	Porsche 3.0 L Turbo I4	**P**	50
27 DNF	LMGT2	59	(Netherlands) Marcos Racing International	(Netherlands) Cor Euser (United Kingdom) Christian Vann (Germany) Harald Becker	Marcos Mantara LM600	**D**	49
27 DNF	LMGT2	59	(Netherlands) Marcos Racing International	(Netherlands) Cor Euser (United Kingdom) Christian Vann (Germany) Harald Becker	Chevrolet 6.0 L V8	**D**	49
28 DNF	WSC	29	(United States) Intersport Racing	(United States) Sam Brown (United States) Ken Dromm (United States) Simon Gregg (Canada) Jacek Mucha	Riley & Scott Mk III	**G**	31
28 DNF	WSC	29	(United States) Intersport Racing	(United States) Sam Brown (United States) Ken Dromm (United States) Simon Gregg (Canada) Jacek Mucha	Ford 5.0 L V8	**G**	31
29 DNF	GT3	23	(United States) Alex Job Racing	(United States) Kelly Collins (United States) Darryl Havens (United States) Cort Wagner	Porsche 911 Carrera RSR	**P**	0
29 DNF	GT3	23	(United States) Alex Job Racing	(United States) Kelly Collins (United States) Darryl Havens (United States) Cort Wagner	Porsche 3.8 L Flat-6	**P**	0
DNS	GT1	5	(United States) Panoz Motorsports	(United States) Johnny O'Connell (United Kingdom) Jamie Davies (France) Éric Bernard	Panoz Esperante GTR-1	**M**	-
DNS	GT1	5	(United States) Panoz Motorsports	(United States) Johnny O'Connell (United Kingdom) Jamie Davies (France) Éric Bernard	Ford (Roush) 6.0 L V8	**M**	-
DNS	LMP1	21	(France) Solution F	(France) Philippe Gache (France) Anthony Beltoise (France) Jérôme Policand	Riley & Scott Mk III	**P**	-
DNS	LMP1	21	(France) Solution F	(France) Philippe Gache (France) Anthony Beltoise (France) Jérôme Policand	Ford 5.0 L V8	**P**	-

=== Statistics ===
- Pole Position - Allan McNish (#26 Porsche AG) - 1:13.754
- Fastest Lap - Allan McNish (#26 Porsche AG) - 1:15.239
- Average Speed - 164.62 km/h

== Post-race ==
With a total of 31 entrants, including a large number of European teams, the ACO considered the race a success. The only downside was that BMW, who had initially entered their V8-powered Riley & Scott Mk IIIs, did not show up for the race. That car tested after the race, alongside the new Lola B98/10. The ACO and Don Panoz pushed ahead with their plans and announced the American Le Mans Series for 1999. IMSA, whose own racing series was faltering, decided to take instead take over as sanctioning body for the new American Le Mans Series.

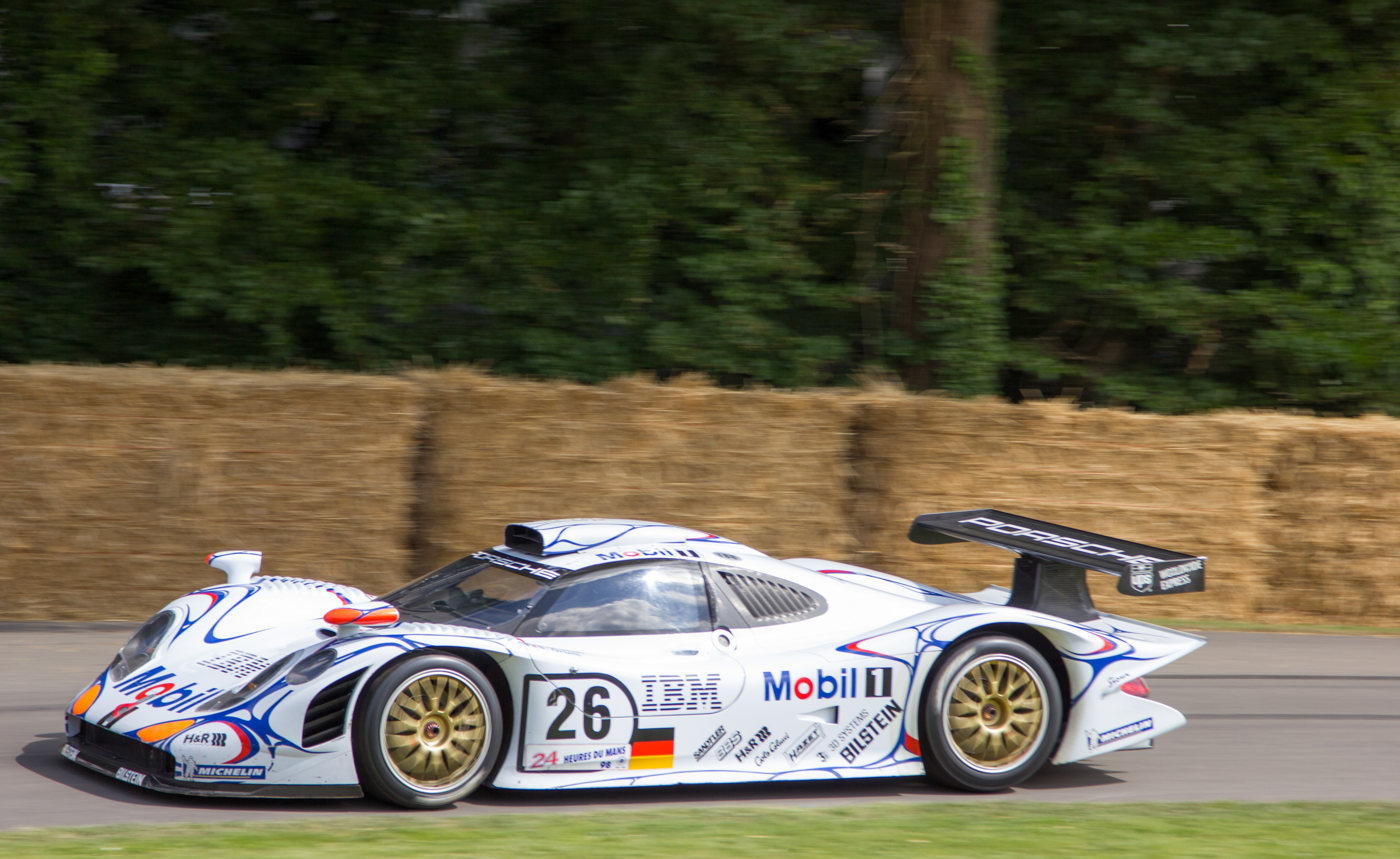
Porsche 911 GT1 picture at the Goodwood festival of speed

The #26 Porsche 911 GT1, which had won the pole position for the race, did not finish the race; the car, piloted by Yannick Dalmas, flipped in a blowover between turns 8 and 9. This incident, as well as similar blowover incidents to the BMW V12 LMR during the 2000 Petit Le Mans and the Mercedes-Benz CLR during the 1999 24 Hours of Le Mans, resulted in Champion Racing not racing a GT1-98 and new regulations introduced in 2004 that changed the cars' geometry and reduced the chance of blow-overs.

The ACO later organised further one-off experimental races in preparation for new series, with the 1999 Le Mans Fuji 1000km, the 2000 Race of a Thousand Years, the 2003 1000km of Le Mans and the 2009 1000 km of Okayama.
