= 1998 International Sports Racing Series Paul Ricard =

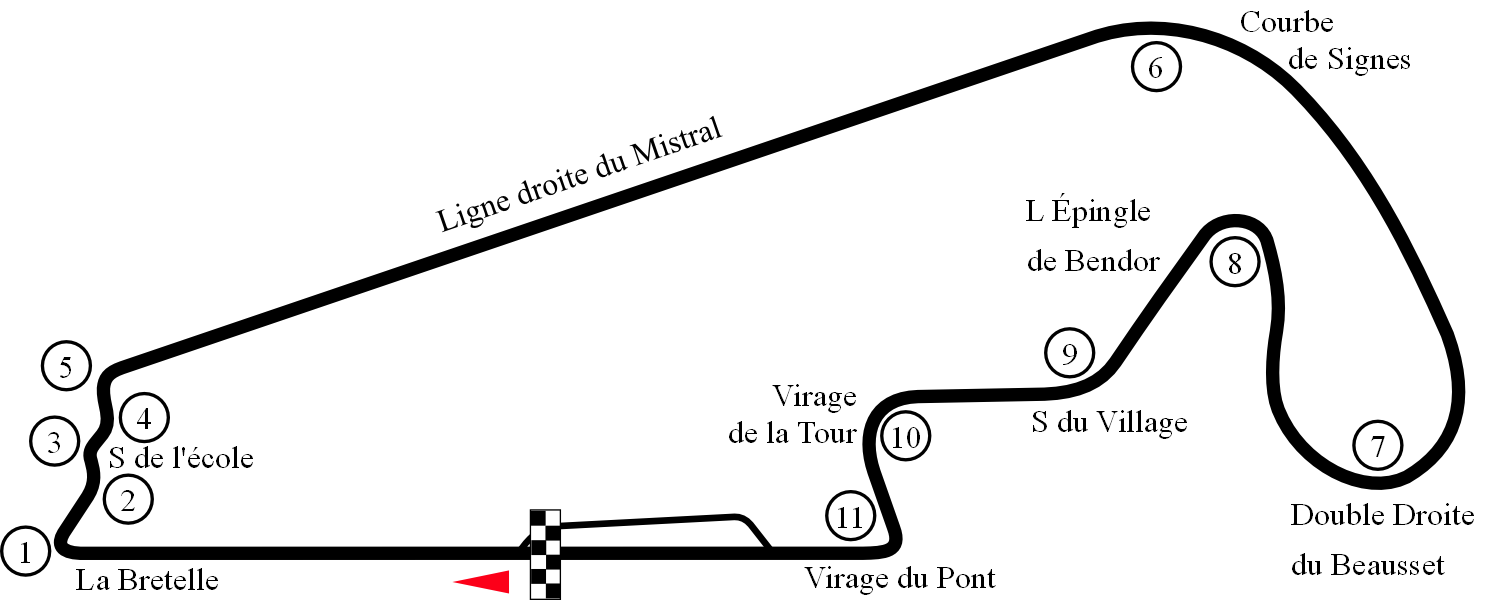
Layout of the Circuit Paul Ricard short circuit (1986-2001)

The 1998 Paul Ricard 2 Hours 30 Minutes was the first race of the 1998 International Sports Racing Series. It took place at Circuit Paul Ricard, France on April 13, 1998.

== Official results ==
Class winners in bold.

Pos	Class	No	Team	Drivers	Chassis	Tyre	Laps
Pos	Class	No	Team	Drivers	Engine	Tyre	Laps
1	**SR1**	**27**	**(Switzerland) Horag Lista Team**	**(Switzerland) Fredy Lienhard (Belgium) Didier Theys**	**Ferrari 333 SP**	Y	**107**
1	**SR1**	**27**	**(Switzerland) Horag Lista Team**	**(Switzerland) Fredy Lienhard (Belgium) Didier Theys**	**Ferrari F310E 4.0L V12**	Y	**107**
2	SR1	9	(Germany) Kremer Racing	(Spain) Alfonso de Orleans (Spain) Tomás Saldaña (Italy) Almo Coppelli	Kremer K8 Spyder	G	103
2	SR1	9	(Germany) Kremer Racing	(Spain) Alfonso de Orleans (Spain) Tomás Saldaña (Italy) Almo Coppelli	Porsche Type-935 3.0L Turbo Flat-6	G	103
3	SR1	16	(Italy) Target 24	(Italy) Alex Caffi (Switzerland) Andrea Chiesa	Riley & Scott Mk III	Y	102
3	SR1	16	(Italy) Target 24	(Italy) Alex Caffi (Switzerland) Andrea Chiesa	Chevrolet 5.0L V8	Y	102
4	**CN**	**41**	**(Italy) Centenari Racing SRL**	**(Italy) Arturo Merzario (United Kingdom) Robin Donovan (Italy) Fulvio Ballabio**	**Centenari M1**	P	**101**
4	**CN**	**41**	**(Italy) Centenari Racing SRL**	**(Italy) Arturo Merzario (United Kingdom) Robin Donovan (Italy) Fulvio Ballabio**	**Alfa Romeo 3.0L V6**	P	**101**
5	SR1	6	(Italy) Auto Sport Racing SRL	(Switzerland) Enzo Calderari (Switzerland) Lilian Bryner (Italy) Angelo Zadra	Ferrari 333 SP	P	101
5	SR1	6	(Italy) Auto Sport Racing SRL	(Switzerland) Enzo Calderari (Switzerland) Lilian Bryner (Italy) Angelo Zadra	Ferrari F310E 4.0L V12	P	101
6	CN	40	(Italy) Centenari Racing SRL (France) La Filière	(France) Xavier Pompidou (France) Loïc Depailler (Italy) Marco Lucchinelli	Centenari MAC3	P	98
6	CN	40	(Italy) Centenari Racing SRL (France) La Filière	(France) Xavier Pompidou (France) Loïc Depailler (Italy) Marco Lucchinelli	Alfa Romeo 3.0L V6	P	98
NC	CN	46	(Italy) Luigi Taverna Racing (Italy) Classic Owners Club	(Italy) Luigi Taverna (Italy) Valerio Leone (Italy) Ferruccio Leone	Osella PA20	P	76
NC	CN	46	(Italy) Luigi Taverna Racing (Italy) Classic Owners Club	(Italy) Luigi Taverna (Italy) Valerio Leone (Italy) Ferruccio Leone	BMW 3.0L I6	P	76
NC	CN	42	(Italy) Osella SRL	(Italy) Felice Tedeschi (Italy) Gianluca Giraudi	Osella PA20P	P	?
NC	CN	42	(Italy) Osella SRL	(Italy) Felice Tedeschi (Italy) Gianluca Giraudi	BMW 3.0L I6	P	?
DNF	SR1	5	(France) JB Giesse Team Ferrari	(France) Emmanuel Collard (Italy) Vincenzo Sospiri	Ferrari 333 SP	MI	41
DNF	SR1	5	(France) JB Giesse Team Ferrari	(France) Emmanuel Collard (Italy) Vincenzo Sospiri	Ferrari F310E 4.0L V12	MI	41
DNF	SR1	2	(United Kingdom) GTC Motorsport (United Kingdom) Lanzante Motorsport	(United Kingdom) Ray Bellm (Germany) Klaus Graf	Ferrari 333 SP	P	?
DNF	SR1	2	(United Kingdom) GTC Motorsport (United Kingdom) Lanzante Motorsport	(United Kingdom) Ray Bellm (Germany) Klaus Graf	Ferrari F310E 4.0L V12	P	?
DNF	SR1	15	(United Kingdom) McNeil Engineering	(Canada) Robbie Stirling (United Kingdom) Chris Hodgetts	Lola 981	D	?
DNF	SR1	15	(United Kingdom) McNeil Engineering	(Canada) Robbie Stirling (United Kingdom) Chris Hodgetts	Judd GV10 3.4L V10	D	?
DNF	SR1	20	(Italy) S.C.I.	(Italy) Ranieri Randaccio (Italy) Stefano Sebastiani	Spice SCI	P	?
DNF	SR1	20	(Italy) S.C.I.	(Italy) Ranieri Randaccio (Italy) Stefano Sebastiani	Ferrari 3.4L V8	P	?
DNF	SR2	30	(United Kingdom) Mark Bailey Racing	(United Kingdom) Mike Millard (United Kingdom) Barry Shaw	MBR 972	D	?
DNF	SR2	30	(United Kingdom) Mark Bailey Racing	(United Kingdom) Mike Millard (United Kingdom) Barry Shaw	Ford 3.0L V6	D	?
DNF	SR2	32	(France) Waterair Sports	(France) André Cholley (France) Édouard Sezionale (France) Lionel Robert	Debora LMP296	MI	?
DNF	SR2	32	(France) Waterair Sports	(France) André Cholley (France) Édouard Sezionale (France) Lionel Robert	Alfa Romeo 3.0L V6	MI	?
DNF	CN	45	(Italy) Tampolli Engineering	(Italy) Fabio Mancini (Italy) Luca Riccitelli	Tampolli RTA-98	P	?
DNF	CN	45	(Italy) Tampolli Engineering	(Italy) Fabio Mancini (Italy) Luca Riccitelli	Alfa Romeo 3.0L V6	P	?

FIA Sportscar Championship
Previous race: None	1998 season	Next race: 1998 FIA Sportscar Championship Brno
