= 1997 International Sports Racing Series Donington =

Layout of the Donington Park

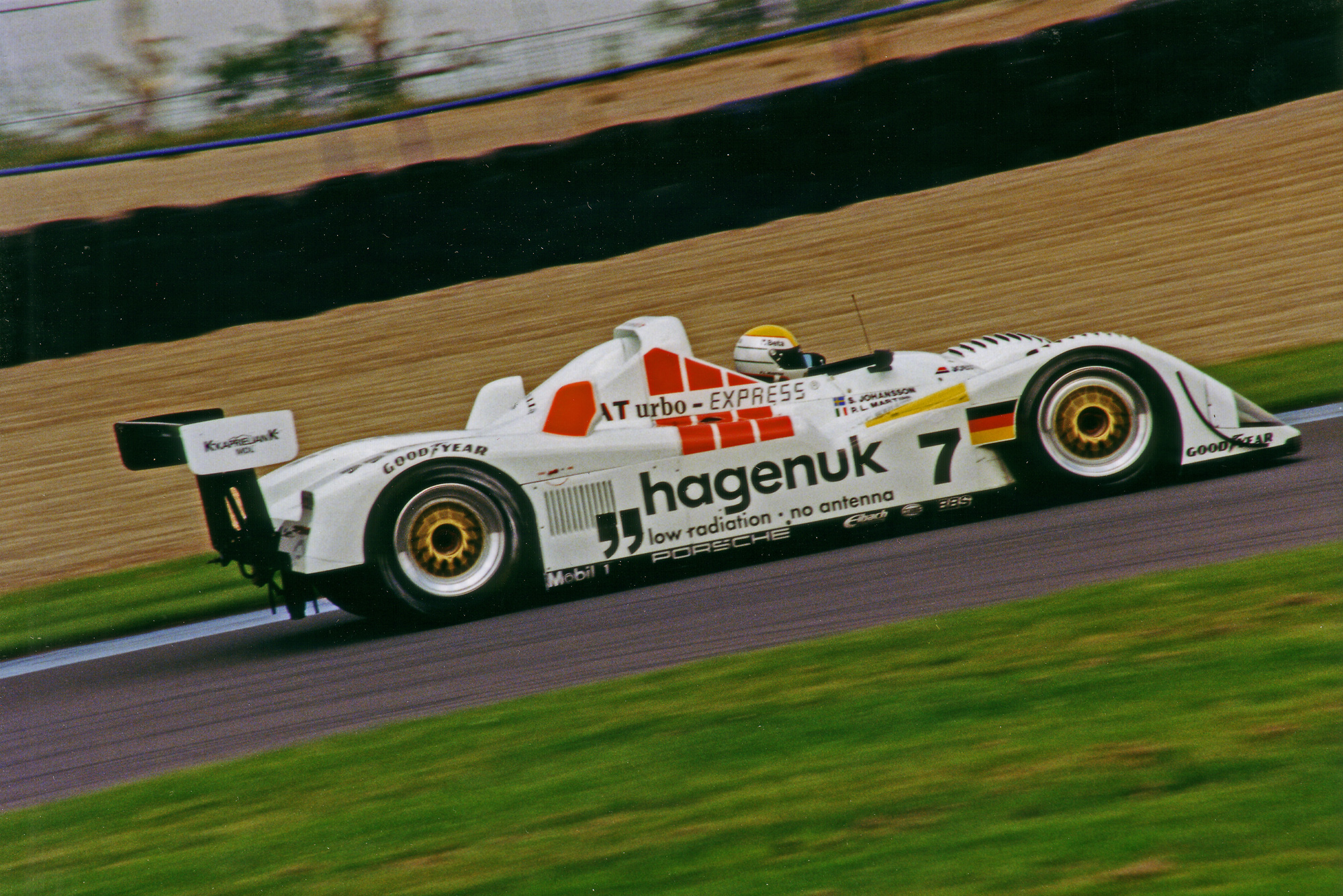
The race winning Porsche WSC-95, driven by Stefan Johansson

The 1997 2 Hours of Donington was the first ever race in the new International Sports Racing Series. It took place at Donington Park, United Kingdom on July 6, 1997.

== Official results ==
Class winners in bold.

Pos	Class	No	Team	Drivers	Chassis	Tyre	Laps
Pos	Class	No	Team	Drivers	Engine	Tyre	Laps
1	**SR1**	**7**	**(Germany) Joest Racing**	**(Sweden) Stefan Johansson (Italy) Pierluigi Martini**	**Porsche WSC-95**	G	**80**
1	**SR1**	**7**	**(Germany) Joest Racing**	**(Sweden) Stefan Johansson (Italy) Pierluigi Martini**	**Porsche Type-935 3.0L Turbo Flat-6**	G	**80**
2	SR1	6	(Switzerland) Horag Hotz Racing	(Switzerland) Fredy Lienhard (Belgium) Didier Theys	Ferrari 333 SP	Y	80
2	SR1	6	(Switzerland) Horag Hotz Racing	(Switzerland) Fredy Lienhard (Belgium) Didier Theys	Ferrari F310E 4.0L V12	Y	80
3	SR1	4	(France) Courage Compétition	(France) Didier Cottaz (France) Jérôme Policand	Courage C36	MI	77
3	SR1	4	(France) Courage Compétition	(France) Didier Cottaz (France) Jérôme Policand	Porsche Type-935 3.0L Turbo Flat-6	MI	77
4	SR1	5	(France) Elf La Filière	(France) Henri Pescarolo (France) Emmanuel Clérico	Courage C36	MI	74
4	SR1	5	(France) Elf La Filière	(France) Henri Pescarolo (France) Emmanuel Clérico	Porsche Type-935 3.0L Turbo Flat-6	MI	74
5	**SR2**	**20**	**(Italy) Centenari**	**(Italy) Arturo Merzario (Italy) Giovanni Li Calzi**	**Centenari M1**	P	**72**
5	**SR2**	**20**	**(Italy) Centenari**	**(Italy) Arturo Merzario (Italy) Giovanni Li Calzi**	**Alfa Romeo 3.0L V6**	P	**72**
DNF	SR1	8	(France) Pilot Racing	(France) Michel Ferté (Spain) Adrian Campos	Ferrari 333 SP	D	76
DNF	SR1	8	(France) Pilot Racing	(France) Michel Ferté (Spain) Adrian Campos	Ferrari F310E 4.0L V12	D	76
DNF	SR2	18	(France) Didier Bonnet Racing	(United Kingdom) Glenn Dudley (United Kingdom) Paul Cope	Debora LMP297	MI	22
DNF	SR2	18	(France) Didier Bonnet Racing	(United Kingdom) Glenn Dudley (United Kingdom) Paul Cope	BMW 3.0L I6	MI	22
DNF	SR2	17	(France) Didier Bonnet Racing	(France) Didier Bonnet (France) Jacques Chevallier	Debora LMP296	MI	6
DNF	SR2	17	(France) Didier Bonnet Racing	(France) Didier Bonnet (France) Jacques Chevallier	Ford Cosworth 2.0L Turbo I4	MI	6
DNS	SR1	14	(United Kingdom) Pacific Racing	(Austria) Franz Konrad (United Kingdom) Richard Dean (Germany) Wido Rössler	BRM P301	P	0
DNS	SR1	14	(United Kingdom) Pacific Racing	(Austria) Franz Konrad (United Kingdom) Richard Dean (Germany) Wido Rössler	Nissan 3.0L Turbo V6	P	0

FIA Sportscar Championship
Previous race: None	1997 season	Next race: 1997 FIA Sportscar Championship Zolder
