= 1997 International Sports Racing Series =

Seasons
- ← none 1998 →

The 1997 International Sports Racing Series season was the first season of International Sports Racing Series (later known as the FIA Sportscar Championship). It was a series for sportscar style prototypes broken into two classes based on power and weight, called SR1 and SR2. It began on July 6, 1997, and ended November 9, 1997, after 4 races.

As a new series, and with only 4 races, no championships were awarded for teams or drivers.

== Schedule ==
Rnd	Race	Circuit	Date
1	(United Kingdom) Donington 2 Hours	Donington Park	July 6
2	(Belgium) Zolder 1 Hour 15 Minutes	Zolder Circuit	August 3
3	(Czech Republic) Masaryk Grand Prix (30 Minutes)	Autodrom Brno Masaryk	September 14
4	(Spain) Gran Premio Repsol Sport Prototipos (2 Hours)	Circuito Permanente Del Jarama	November 9

== Season results ==
Rnd	Circuit	SR1 Winning Team	SR2 Winning Team	Results
Rnd	Circuit	SR1 Winning Drivers	SR2 Winning Drivers	Results
1	Donington	(Germany) #7 Joest Racing	(Italy) #20 Centenari	Results
1	Donington	(Sweden) Stefan Johansson (Italy) Pierluigi Martini	(Italy) Arturo Merzario (Italy) Giovanni Li Calzi	Results
2	Zolder	(Switzerland) #6 Horag Hotz Racing	None	Results
2	Zolder	(Switzerland) Fredy Lienhard (Belgium) Didier Theys		Results
3†	Brno	None	(Italy) #20 Symbol Team	Results
3†	Brno		(Italy) Arturo Merzario	Results
4	Jarama	(France) #4 Courage Compétition	(Italy) #20 Symbol Team	Results
4	Jarama	(France) Didier Cottaz (France) Jérôme Policand	(Italy) Arturo Merzario (United Kingdom) Robin Donovan	Results

† - Round 3 was included in the championship, but only 1 SR2-class car participated. The race was instead made up of CN and S2000 based hillclimb cars.
