= Debora LMP296 =

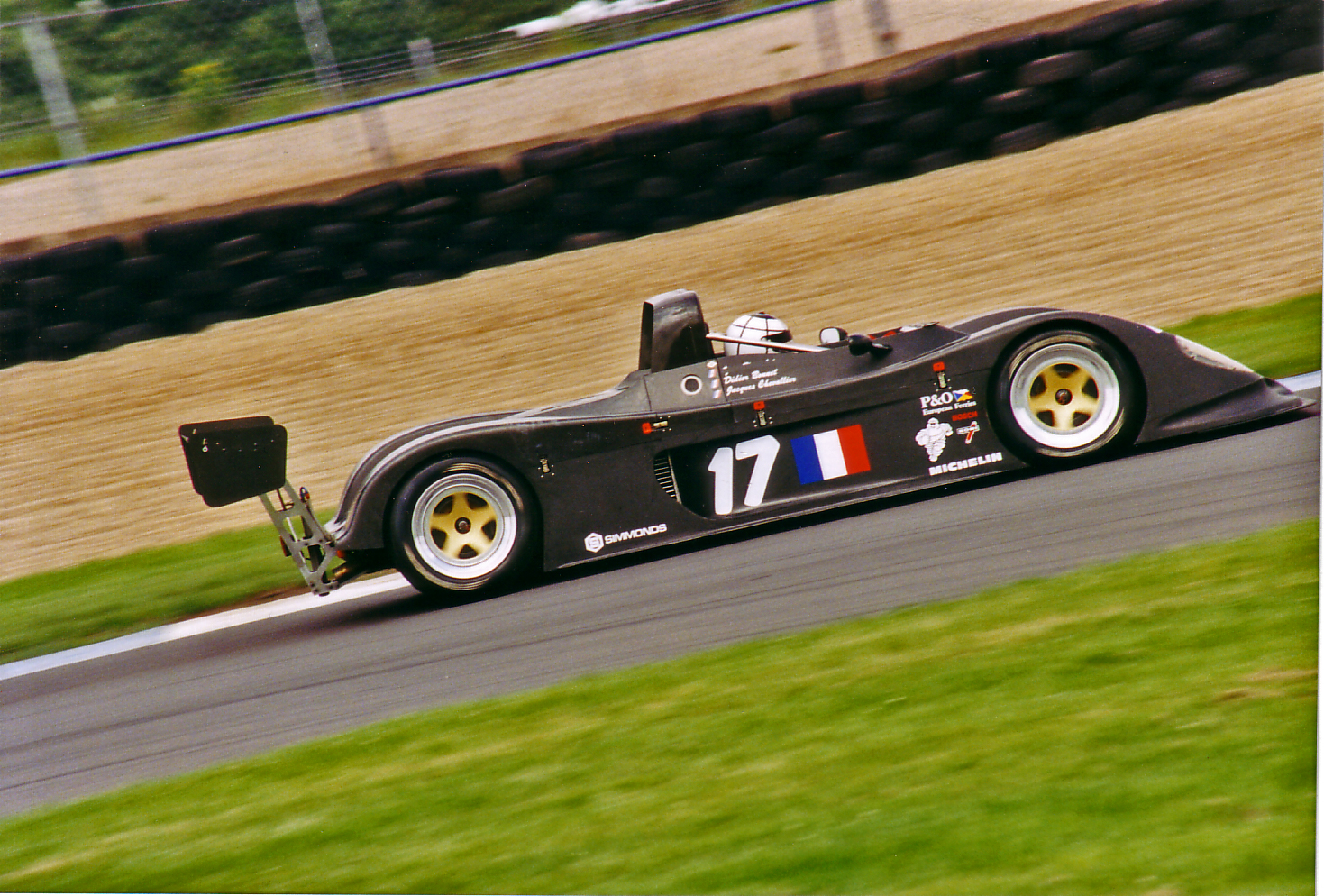
- Constructor: Debora
- Designers: Roger Rimmer (chassis); Didier Bonnet (body)
- Predecessor: Debora LMP295
- Successor: Debora LMP200

Technical specifications
- Chassis: Aluminium honeycomb monocoque, with carbon fibre-reinforced cockpit
- Suspension (front): KONI double-wishbone suspension
- Suspension (rear): KONI double-wishbone suspension
- Engine: Cosworth BDG 1,994 cc (121.7 cu in) turbocharged I4; Alfa Romeo 3,000 cc (183.1 cu in) naturally-aspirated V6; BMW 3,000–3,200 cc (183.1–195.3 cu in) naturally-aspirated I6; Nissan 3,000 cc (183.1 cu in) naturally-aspirated V6 mid-engined
- Transmission: Hewland FGC 5-speed
- Weight: 650–700 kg (1,433.0–1,543.2 lb)
- Tyres: Michelin

Competition history
- Notable entrants: Didier Bonnet Racing; P. R. Bruneau
- Debut: LMP296: 1996 24 Hours of Le Mans; LMP297: 1997 International Sports Racing Series Donington; 2000 SportsRacing World Cup Barcelona
Races	Wins
20 (22 entries) (LMP296); 7 (10 entries) (LMP297); 21 (23 entries) (LMP299)	5 (SR2 class) (LMP296); 2 (SR2 class) (LMP297); 0
- Teams' Championships: 1: (1998 ISRS, SR2 category)

The Debora LMP296 was a Le Mans Prototype, built by Debora Automobiles in 1996 for use in the 24 Hours of Le Mans. The car was originally entered with a 2-litre turbocharged Cosworth straight-four engine, but several other engines were used in the car's three-year career. Two cars are known to have been built. In conjunction with the LMP297, the car helped Waterair Sport to the International Sports Racing Series SR2 Team's Championship in 1998. The LMP296 was updated into the LMP299 for 2000.

== Design and development ==
The LMP296's chassis was developed by Roger Rimmer, whilst its bodywork was designed by Didier Bonnet. It featured an aluminium honeycomb monocoque chassis, and its open-top bodywork was made from carbon fibre. When it was initially built, it featured a Ford Escort RS Cosworth-derived 2-litre turbocharged straight-four engine, race-prepared by Fochesato, and capable of a claimed maximum output of 370 hp (276 kW; 375 PS) The engine's power was transmitted to the wheels via a 5-speed Hewland FGC transmission. The LMP296 used double-wishbone suspension developed by KONI, and its Michelin-shod 16" wheels were stopped by Alcon disc brakes, with 4-piston calipers. In 1998, various other engines were experimented with; a 3-litre Alfa Romeo V6 engine, 3- and 3.2-litre BMW straight-six engines, before the team finally settled on the 3-litre BMW unit after the 1998 24 Hours of Le Mans.

== Racing history ==
=== LMP296 ===
==== 1996 ====
The Debora LMP296 was first entered in the 24 Hours of Le Mans pre-qualifying session in 1996 by Didier Bonnet Racing. Both LMP296 chassis were entered, but the LMP296-01 chassis did not arrive, and the LMP296-02 chassis, driven by Guillaume Gomez, was only able to finish in 56th position, and, as a result, was not allowed to participate in the main event. However, the LMP296-01 chassis, driven by Edouard Sezionale, Jean-Claude Basso and Thierry Lecerf, was allowed to compete, and qualified 52nd for the race. The car did not start the race, due to engine problems. The car made its first racing appearance in the 1996 Le Mans Autumn Cup, with its drivers Jacques Chevalier, Dominique Lacaud and Patrice Roussel finishing fifth overall, and second in the LMP2 class.

==== 1997 ====
Its next appearance came at the first ever International Sports Racing Series race in 1997, held at Donington Park, but the car, now classified as a SR1 car and driven by Didier Bonnet and Chevalier, retired after just six laps; the new Debora LMP297 car, which was classified in the SR2 category, also retired. The LMP296 was listed as a SR2 class car for second round at Zolder, but the car was crashed during the formation lap, and was unable to make the start. Neither Debora car competed at Brno, but both were present at the season finale, held at Jarama. Once again classified as a SR1 car, the LMP296, driven by Hervé Regout and David Dussau, finished fourth overall, and third in class.

==== 1998 ====
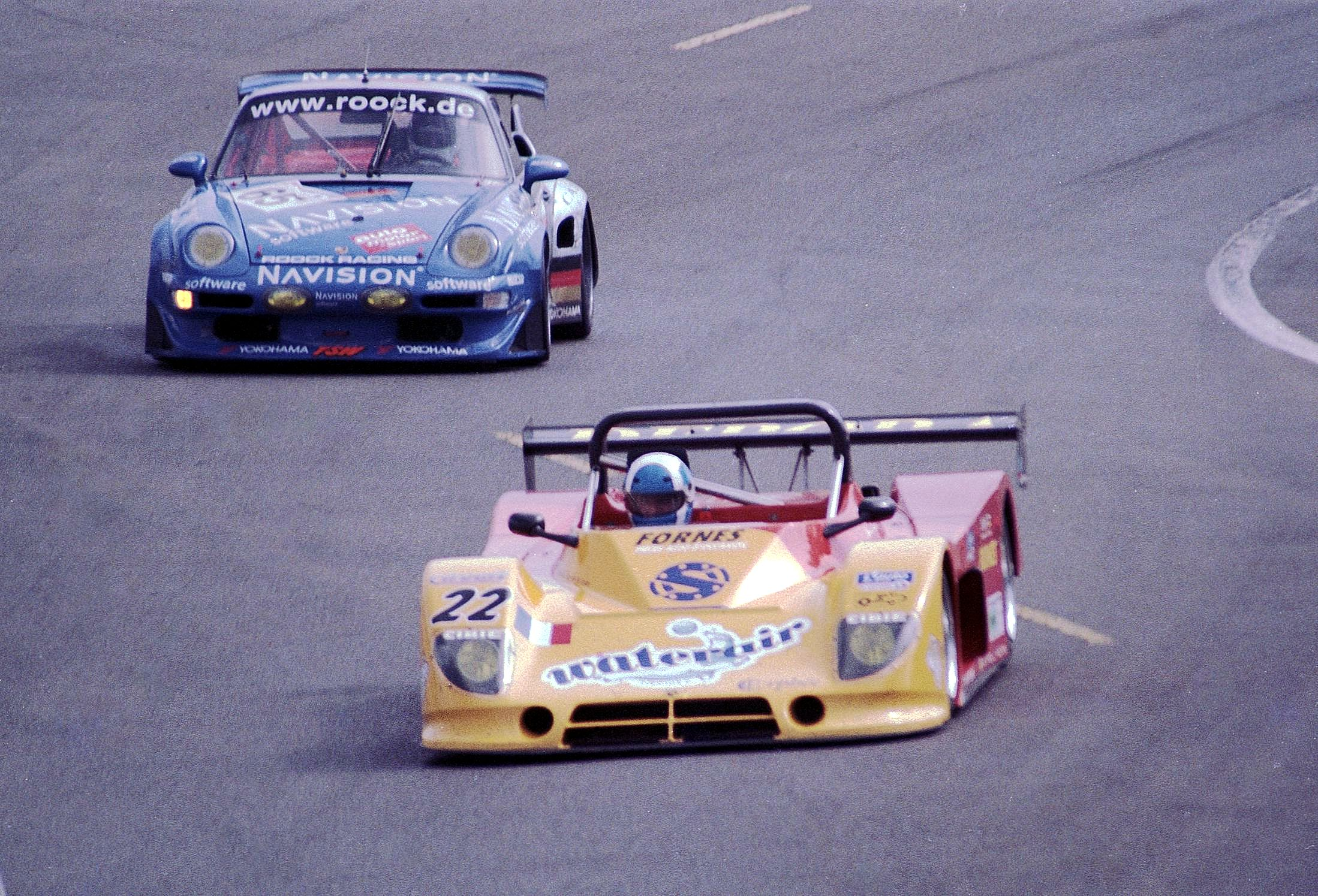
Debora LMP296 at the 1998 24 Hours of Le Mans

For 1998, Didier Bonnet Racing ran the car, under the Waterair Sports banner, in the International Sports Racing Series. The car was fitted with an Alfa Romeo 3-litre V6, in place of the regular Cosworth turbo engine, for the season opener at Paul Ricard, but exhaust damage forced the car out of the race. Didier Bonnet Racing then ran the car under their own name in the pre-qualifying session for the 24 Hours of Le Mans, and Lionel Robert managed to pre-qualify the car in 51st place, with the Alfa Romeo V6 being replaced by a BMW 3-litre straight-6. Robert, Sezionale and Pierre Bruneau were selected to drive the car in the race, with a slightly larger 3.2-litre BMW S50 engine fitted; the car completed 106 laps, before a gearbox failure forced the team to retire the car at around the ten-hour mark. Following this event, the car was refitted with the 3-litre BMW unit, and ran again as Waterair Sports, who entered the car in the third round of the International Sports Racing Series, held at Misano; Sezionale, André Cholley and Jean-Claude de Castelli finished eleventh overall, and took the SR2 class victory, by virtue of being the only car present in that category. The car won the SR2 class again in the following round, held at Donington Park, and finished fifth overall in the hands of de Castelli and François Jakubowski. The fifth round, held at Anderstorp, proved to be unsuccessful for the team; the LMP297, entered for the first time in 1998, failed to start, and the LMP296 retired after a spin on lap two. Waterair Sports then took a 1-2 in the SR2 category at the Nürburgring round, with the LMP296 taking the class victory, and finishing seventh overall. It would be the last time a LMP296 would finish a race in 1998, as the car retired from the Le Mans round, and failed to start the season finale at Kyalami. However, as the LMP297 won both races, Waterair Sports were crowned as the SR2 class Team's Champions for 1998, and finished joint twelfth overall.

==== 1999 ====
For 1999, the International Sports Racing Series became known as the Sports Racing World Cup, and Pierre Bruneau took ownership of the car, running it in his own team. Bruneau, partnered with Marc Rostan and Martin Henderson, finished ninth overall in the season opener at Barcelona, and took a class victory. The team's fortunes reversed at the following round, held at Monza, as they finished last overall and in class - eleventh and sixth respectively. Spa-Francorchamps also saw the team finish last overall and in class; although, this time, it was ninth overall, and second in class. This was followed by a retirement at Pergusa, and a stronger third (of six) in class (twelfth overall) at Donington Park. The car's last ever finish came at the Brno round; a seventh place overall, and a class victory, as all the other SR2 cars retired. The car retired from each of the remaining three events, and Bruneau's team finished runner-up to Cauduro Tampolli Team in the SR2 Team's Championship, and eleventh in the overall Team's Championship.

=== LMP297 ===
==== 1997 ====
The Debora LMP297 was first entered in the 24 Hours of Le Mans pre-qualifying session in 1997 as a LMP650 class car by Didier Bonnet Racing; however, the car, which was fitted with the 2-litre Cosworth turbo engine for the event, finished 46th, which meant that it failed to pre-qualify, and as a result, was not allowed to compete in the race. The car made its International Sports Racing Series debut at the season opener at Donington Park, with Glenn Dudley and Paul Cope driving a 3-litre BMW straight-6 engined LMP297, but the car, which had been once more entered by Didier Bonnet Racing, retired from the race after 22 laps. The car, this time driven by David Dussau and Bernard de Dryver, also retired from the following round at Zolder after 39 laps, following an accident. The car finished for the first time in the season finale at Jarama, with its drivers Patrice Roussel and Bruno Boccard taking fifth place overall, and second in class.

==== 1998 ====
For 1998, Didier Bonnet Racing ran the car under the Waterair Sports banner. The team first entered the car at the fifth round of the season, held at Anderstorp, but the car did not start the race. The next round, held at the Nürburgring, saw the car, driven by André Cholley and David Dussau, finish tenth overall, and second in class. Cholley and Pierre Bruneau followed this with class victories at Le Mans and at Kyalami, on both occasions being the only SR2 car to finish the race. As a result of the points scored with both the LMP296 and the LMP297, Waterair Sports became the SR2 class champions for the 1998 season, and finished joint twelfth overall. This would prove to be the car's last race, as, although it was entered by Debora in the Sports Racing World Cup (which the International Sports Racing Series had been renamed to) in 1999 for the Donington Park round, the car did not arrive, and was not used again.

=== LMP299 ===
==== 2000 ====
The Debora LMP299 made its debut at the opening round of the 2000 Sports Racing World Cup season (SRWC), held at Barcelona. The car was fitted with a 3-litre BMW straight-six engine, allowing it to be classified in the "SRL" category. Pierre Bruneau and Marc Rostan drove the car for Bruneau's PiR Bruneau team, and finished second in the SRL class, eleventh overall. An ignition problem forced the pair to retire from the 500 km Monza after 56 laps, before the team took sixth overall at Spa-Francorchamps, and third in the SRL category. Although the team entered the 24 Hours of Le Mans, and fitted the car with a 3.2-litre BMW straight-six, they were not invited to compete. The team then entered the 1000 km of Nürburgring, part of the American Le Mans Series (ALMS); the car was refitted with the 3-litre BMW straight-six, and was classified as a LMP car. The team finished fourteenth overall, tenth of the LMPs, and third in the LMP675 subclass. The team then returned to the SRWC for the Brno round, with Bruneau being partnered by Robert Pergl and Dominique Lacaud; a broken axle forced them out after three laps. Bruneau was partnered by Rostan and Piers Johnson at Donington Park, but the team retired again; this time due to gearbox failure after 69 laps. Rostan and Bruneau were the two drivers for the penultimate round of the season, held at the Nürburgring; the team finished 17th overall, and sixth in the SRL class. At the final race of the season, held at Magny-Cours, Bruneau and Rostan were joined by Ludovico Manfredi, and the trio took twelfth place overall, and sixth in the SRL category. At the end of the season, PiR Bruneau were classified sixth in the WSRP SRL Team's Championship, with 39 points, whilst Bruneau and Rostan were classified joint ninth in the SRL Driver's Championship. Their single race in the ALMS was enough for them to finish 16th in the ALMS LMP Team's Championship, with 15 points.

==== 2001 ====
In 2001, PiR Bruneau remained in the Sports Racing World Series, which had now been renamed to the FIA Sportscar Championship. The team retained their LMP299, which was now classified as a "SR2" car, and hired Arturo Merzario to partnered Bruneau and Rostan for the opening round, held at Barcelona. The team took eleventh place overall in that race, and seventh in the SR2 class. At the next round, which was the 1000 km of Monza, the team were forced to retire due to accident damage after 81 laps. The team were classified 13th at Spa-Francorchamps, and seventh in class, but retired after 55 laps. The team suffered more problems at the following round, held at Brno; they finished the race, but were classified fourteenth overall and last (seventh in class), having completed 47 laps – this was 19 less than the car ahead. For Magny-Cours, Merzario was replaced by Manfredi, but the team retired again; this time, a gearbox failure after 27 laps was to blame. Donington Park would prove to be more successful; the team finished eleventh overall, and fourth in the SR2 class. Rostan was partnered by Arnie Black for the penultimate round of the season, held at Mondello Park; the team finished last again, although this time that equated to tenth overall, and fourth in the SR2 class. Bruneau returned to partner Rostan in the final race of the season, held at Nürburgring; the team finished ninth overall, and seventh in the SR2 class. The team were again classified sixth in their class in the Team's Championship, whilst Rostan was the highest classified driver, taking tenth with 38 points.

==== 2002 ====
In 2002, PiR Bruneau expanded to a two-car operation; they purchased a Pilbeam MP84, and ran it alongside the Debora LMP299; the latter car had been refitted with a 3-litre Nissan V6 engine. Philippe Hottinguer and Paul Daniels were selected to drive the LMP299 in the opening round at Barcelona, but retired due to a drive shaft issue after 35 laps. At Estoril, Pedro Couceiro and Manuel Gião drove the LMP299, and finished eleventh and last overall, sixth in the SR2 class. Bruneau partnered Daniels at Brno, but the pair did not start the race due to engine problems. At Magny-Cours, Hottinger returned to partner Daniels; however, the engine failed again, forcing the team to retire after 61 laps. For Dijon-Prenois, Daniels drove alongside Rob Croydon; this time, the team were able to finish the race, but finished ninth and last – sixth in the SR2 class. At Spa, Frédéric Bouvy, Christophe Geoffroy and David Sterckx were selected to drive the LMP299, but crashed out of the race after 22 laps. This was the last time the car was entered in a race.
