= Tampolli RTA-98 =

Sports prototype race car

- Category: LMP675/SR2

Technical specifications
- Chassis: Pre-preg fiberglass, steel spaceframe chassis
- Suspension: Unequal length wishbones, pushrod actuated coil springs over shock absorbers, inboard rocker arms
- Length: 4,470 mm (176 in)
- Width: 1,900 mm (75 in)
- Axle track: 1,500 mm (59 in) (front); 1,600 mm (63 in) (rear)
- Wheelbase: 2,525 mm (99.4 in)
- Engine: Alfa Romeo 3.0 L (183.1 cu in) 60° DOHC V6, naturally-aspirated, mid-engined
- Transmission: Hewland NMT-200 6-speed sequential
- Power: 385 hp (287 kW)
- Weight: 720 kg (1,590 lb)

Competition history
- Debut: 1998 International Sports Racing Series Paul Ricard

The Tampolli RTA-98 is a sports prototype race car, designed, developed, and built by Italian manufacturer Tampolli, for sports car racing, conforming to the FIA's LMP675/SR2 class, in 1998.
