= Robin Donovan =

British former racing driver

Robin Merton Donovan (born 19 December 1955 in Rustington, West Sussex) is a British former racing driver. He is best known for competing in 14 editions of the Le Mans 24 hours race; his best result there being sixth overall, third in class (LMP1) and first privateer home driving with 5 x Le Mans winner Derek Bell MBE and Daytona 24 hours winner Jurgen Lassig in 1994 with the Gulf Racing entered and sponsored Kremer Porsche K8.

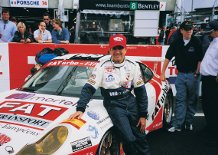
Robin Donovan

== Career ==
After a prominent Formula Ford single seater career, Donovan first began to establish his name as a sports car driver in the British Thundersports series where he won five (class C) rounds of the 8 round series in 1985 driving with Mike O Brien. At the end of 1985, he competed in his first World Endurance Championship race in Selangor Malaysia where he came fifth (C2). He again was Thundersports (class c) series winner in 1986 (the year of his first Le Mans 24 hours) and again in 1987 (class B). In 1988, he drove in Thundersaloons and moved up into the British Touring car Championship in 1989, the year he also competed in the BRDC Sportscar Championship. In 1991, he won the Willhire 24 hours (class A). In 1992 and 1993, he drove for the Star Union team in Interserie European Sportscar Championship and for Kremer Racing in the Le Mans 24 hours. In 1993, he again secured a third place class finish at Le Mans driving for the Augusta Racing GT2 team.

During his international racing career, Donovan competed in rounds of the World Sports-Prototype Championship, the World Sportscar Championship, the BPR Global GT Series and the International Sports Racing Series. In 1998, with only one race win but a series of podiums, he led the International Sports Racing Series (CN class) throughout the season until the final round at Kyalami where he eventually finished equal vice Champion. After 1998, he continued to compete at Le Mans and in the ISCS (the international touring car endurance series) taking class podiums at Vallelunga (2), Barcelona and the Nurburgring 24hrs.

Donovan is currently director of Dettaglio, a motorsport events and supercar tours company.

== Complete 24 Hours of Le Mans results ==
Year	Team	Co-Drivers	Car	Class	Laps	Pos.	Class Pos.
1986	Bartlett/Goodmans Sound	Richard Jones; Nick Adams	Bardon DB1-Ford Cosworth	C2	211	NC	NC
1987	John Bartlett Racing	Tim Lee-Davey; Raymond Boutinaud	Bardon DB1/2-Ford Cosworth	C2	172	DNF	DNF
1988	Team Lucky Strike Schanche	Martin Schanche; Robin Smith	Argo JM19C	C1	278	25th	16th
1989	Tiga Race Team	John Sheldon; Max Cohen-Olivar	Tiga GC289-Ford Cosworth	C2	126	DNF	DNF
1990	Chamberlain Engineering	Philippe de Henning; Charles Zwolsman	Spice SE90C-Ford Cosworth	C2	255	DNF	DNF
1991	Euro Racing; Chamberlain Engineering	Nick Adams; Richard Jones	Spice SE89C-Ford Cosworth	C2	128	DNF	DNF
1992	Kremer Porsche Racing	Charles Rickett; Almo Coppelli	Porsche 962CK6	C3	297	11th	4th
1993	Kremer Porsche Racing	Steve Fossett; Almo Coppelli	Porsche 962CK6	C2	204	DNF	DNF
1994	Gulf Oil Racing	Derek Bell; Jürgen Lässig	Kremer K8 Spyder-Porsche	LMP1 /C90	316	6th	3rd
1995	Agusta Racing Team	Riccardo Agusta; Eugene O'Brien	Callaway Corvette SuperNatural	GT2	271	11th	3rd
1996	Ennea SRL; Ferrari Club Italia	Piero Nappi; Tetsuya Ota	Ferrari F40 GTE	GT1	129	DNF	DNF
1998	Chereau Sports; Larbre Compétition	Jean-Pierre Jarier; Carl Rosenblad	Porsche 911 GT2	GT2	164	DNF	DNF
1999	Autoexe Motorsport	Yojiro Terada; Franck Fréon	Autoexe LMP99-Ford	LMP	74	DNF	DNF
2001	Racing Engineering	Terry Lingner; Chris MacAllister	Porsche 911 GT3-RS	GT	44	DNF	DNF

== Results ==
- 2004 & 2006 Vallelunga 6 hrs. BMW M3 24hr 2nd in class
- 2001 Le Mans 24hrs. Racing Engineering / FAT Turbo Porsche 911 GT3 RS
- 2000 International Touring Cars (ISCS) GTS BMW M3. 2nd in class Nurburgring 24hrs. Ist in class, 2nd Overall Barcelona.
- 1999 Le Mans 24hrs with Auto Exe / AM PM Japan Riley & Scott LMP1
- 1998 Le Mans 24hrs with Larbre Competition / PlayStation Porsche 911 GT3 RS. FIA International Sports Racing Series. Elf Team Centenari Alfa Romeo 3.0, 3 Podiums. 1 class win, Paul Ricard.
- 1997 Elf Team Centenari. One class win / 2nd overall, Jarama.
- 1996 Le Mans 24hrs with Ennea Team Ferrari. Ferrari F40 GT1
- 1995 Le Mans 24hrs with Augusta Racing. Corvette 6.0 Chevrolet. 3rd in class. 11th overall. Global Endurance GT Championship with Augusta Racing. Corvette 6.0 Chevrolet.
- 1994 Le Mans 24hrs with Gulf Racing (sharing with Derek Bell) Gulf Kremer Porsche LMP1. Front row start. 1st privateer. 3rd in class. 6th overall. Dunlop Rover Turbo Cup Championship. Blue Hawk Racing. Rover Turbo 2.0
- 1993 Le Mans 24hrs with Kremer Racing. Porsche 962 Group C1 Interserie European Sportscar Championship. JB Racing. Lola Buick 3.3 Indy Car
- 1992 Le Mans 24hrs with Kremer Racing. Porsche 962 Group C1. 4th in class. 11th overall. Interserie European Sportscar Championship. Star Union. Gunnar Porsche 966 Spyder
- 1991 Interserie European Sportscar Championship. Gunnar Porsche 962/966. Winner class A Willhire 24hrs, Esso Superlube Saloon Car Championship. Winner overall Independence Day Trophy Meeting. Lime Rock. IMSA GTP class. Gunnar Racing Porsche 962/966. Le Mans 24hrs with Chamberlain Engineering / Financial Times Spice Cosworth C2
- 1990 Le Mans 24hrs with Chamberlain Engineering /Dianetique Spice Cosworth. Led C2 class
- 1989 Le Mans 24hrs with factory entered Tiga Cosworth Group C2. British Touring Car Championship with Blue Hawk Racing. Sierra Cosworth 3.0. British C2 Sportscar Championship with JB Racing Harrier 5.0 Chevrolet
- 1988 Le Mans 24hrs with Team Lucky Strike. Argo Cosworth 3.3 Group C2. 5th in class. British Thundersaloons Championship. Blue Hawk Racing. Honda Legend 7.0 Chevrolet, one podium, Brands Hatch.
- 1987 Le Mans 24hrs and World Sportscar Championship with JB Racing / Penthouse Bardon Cosworth Group C2. British Thundersports Championship with Blue Hawk Racing Harrier 3.9 Cosworth. 3 podiums. 3 class wins (B series winner).
- 1986 Le Mans 24hrs and World Sportscar Championship with JB Racing / Goodmans Sound Bardon Cosworth Group C2. British Thundersports Championship with Blue Hawk Racing Shrike Ford P15. 5 podiums. 2 class wins (C series winner).
- 1985 British Thundersports Championship with Blue Hawk Racing Shrike Ford P15. 5 podiums. 5 class wins (C series winner).
- 1979-83 Front runner in Dunlop Star of Tomorrow, P&O & Champion of Brands FF Championships.

== Bibliography ==
Donovan, Robin (15 April 2026). The Pits and the Mulsanne (Hardcover ed.). Robin Donovan. p. 349. ISBN 978-1-97298-994-4.
