= Ferrari 333 SP =

1993 prototype racing car

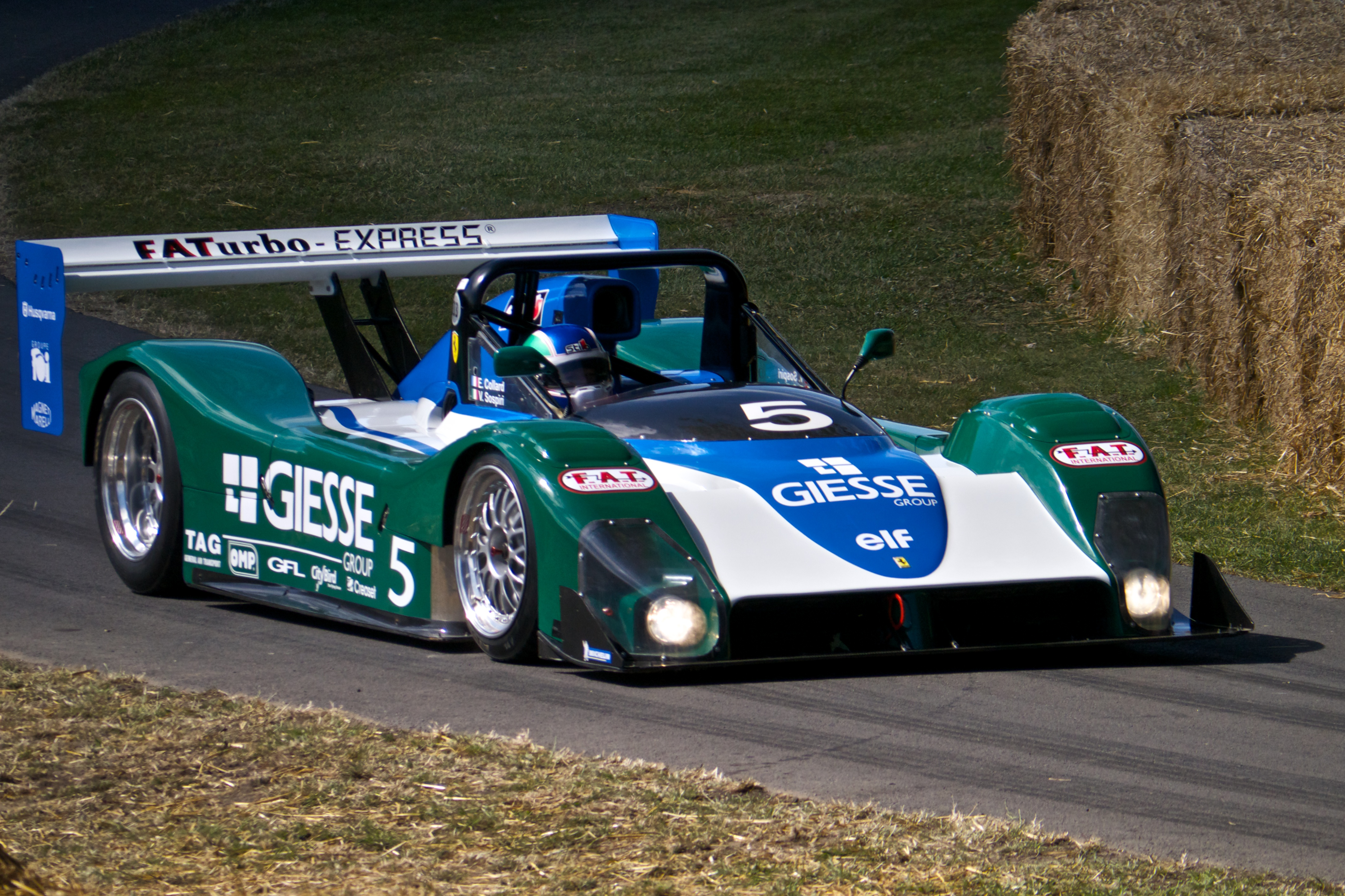
- Category: Le Mans Prototype
- Constructor: (Italy) Dallara (Series One); (Italy) Michelotto (Series Two)
- Designers: Mauro Rioli (Technical Director); Giampaolo Dallara (Technical Advisor); Dialma Zinelli (Aerodynamicist, Dallara); Giorgio Camaschella (Aerodynamicist, Ferrari); Tony Southgate (Design Consultant)
- Predecessor: Ferrari 312 PB
- Successor: Ferrari 499P

Technical specifications
- Chassis: carbon fibre and aluminium honeycomb monocoque
- Suspension (front): Double wishbone, pushrod operated coil spring and dampers
- Suspension (rear): Double wishbone, pushrod operated coil spring and dampers
- Engine: Ferrari F130E 4.0 L V12 Naturally aspirated mid, longitudinally mounted
- Transmission: Ferrari 5-speed sequential manual
- Tyres: Pirelli; Yokohama

Competition history
- Notable entrants: (Italy) Momo Corse; (United States) Team Scandia; (United States) Euromotorsport; (United States) Moretti Racing; (United States) Doran Racing; (United States) Doyle-Risi Racing; (United States) Dollahite Racing; (France) JMB Racing; (Italy) BMS Scuderia Italia; (Monaco) GLV Racing; (United States) Risi Competizione
- Notable drivers: (Belgium) Didier Theys; (Italy) Mauro Baldi; (Switzerland) Fredy Lienhard; (Italy) Giampiero Moretti; (Spain) Fermín Velez; (France) Emmanuel Collard; (Italy) Vincenzo Sospiri
- Debut: 1994 Road Atlanta Sprint race
Races	Wins	Poles
144	56	69
- Teams' Championships: 1998 IMSA GT Championship; 1998 FIA Sportscar Championship; 1999 FIA Sportscar Championship; 2000 FIA Sportscar Championship; 2001 FIA Sportscar Championship
- Constructors' Championships: 1995 IMSA GT Championship; 1998 IMSA GT Championship; 2001 FIA Sportscar Championship
- Drivers' Championships: 1995 IMSA GT Championship; 1998 FIA Sportscar Championship; 1999 FIA Sportscar Championship; 2000 FIA Sportscar Championship; 2001 FIA Sportscar Championship

The Ferrari 333 SP is a sports prototype racing car designed by Ferrari that was built by Italian racing car manufacturer Dallara and later Michelotto to compete in the World Sports Car championship for Ferrari. Unveiled at the end of 1993, at the behest of amateur racer Giampiero Moretti (owner of the MOMO auto parts business), the 333 SP marked Ferrari's official return to sports car racing since 1973. The car was built to compete in the IMSA's new WSC class, which replaced the previous GTP cars.

A total of 40 chassis were built, the first 4 by Ferrari, then 11 by Dallara and the remaining 26 by Michelotto. It is believed that 27 chassis were raced, between 1994 and 2003.

== Development ==
While the 333 SP was in its planning stages, Ferrari contracted Italian motor racing manufacturer Dallara to assist with its development. Dallara provided the transmission and suspension, and were also responsible for aerodynamic development and bodywork construction. The gearbox used Hewland mechanical parts, housed within a custom-built Dallara casing. Ferrari developed the chassis tub and engine in-house. British race car engineering consultant Tony Southgate joined the project in early 1994 and went on to help design and run the cars until the end of 1995.

The Tipo F130E engine was a modified version of the 65-degree V12 engine used in the 1990 Ferrari 641 Formula One car, enlarged from 3.5 L to 4.0 L and producing 641 hp (650 PS; 478 kW) @ 11,000 rpm; though still down on power from the original engine by about 40–70 hp (41–71 PS; 30–52 kW). Southgate later described it as "one of the most reliable race engines I have ever worked with."

== Racing career ==
The car debuted in the third round of the 1994 IMSA GT Championship at Road Atlanta on 17th April, securing the first two places. Four cars were allocated to three teams, Euromotorsport (chassis 002 built by Ferrari and chassis 005 built by Dallara), Momo Corse (chassis 004, Ferrari), and Team Scandia (chassis 003, Ferrari). In the following round, at Lime Rock, the Italian cars monopolized the podium, and would take three more wins until the end of the season. However, because Ferrari missed the first two rounds of the IMSA Championship (Daytona and Sebring), they were beaten by Oldsmobile to the makes' championship (Kudzu chassis), and Andy Evans was the best placed Ferrari driver at fifth in the drivers' championship.

In 1995, the 333 SP took its revenge. Although proving unreliable at the 24 Hours of Daytona, it took top honors at the 12 Hours of Sebring before securing another four wins. With the four cars taking more consistent results, Ferrari won the makes championship and Fermín Velez won the drivers title, with Mauro Baldi and Wayne Taylor taking third and fourth, respectively. The car also made its debut at the 24 Hours of Le Mans, but was not much competitive that year: its best result was the 6th spot in 1997. However, next year the red #12 of Risi Competizione team had won LMP1 class at their first Le Mans race. The following year the car was still competitive and tied with Oldsmobile in the constructors championship but lost on a tie-breaker, as well as allowing ex-F1 driver Max Papis to score a final second place and Didier Theys a fourth in the drivers championship, even though the 333 SP won only two races.

In 1997, the Ferrari won again at Sebring and took another four wins. However, the car was losing its competitiveness against the more modern Riley & Scott, and taking 4th, 5th and 6th in the drivers championship and second in the makes was the best it could with a four-year-old design. In 1998, the car was slightly updated, and found new life in the International Sports Racing Series (later called FIA Sportscar Championship), winning every race and scoring the championship's two top spots with the winners Emmanuel Collard and Vincenzo Sospiri and runners-up Didier Theys and Fredy Lienhard. In America, the car won three rounds in the IMSA Championship (including Sebring) and took Wayne Taylor to second in the final standings while Ferrari won the makes championship. In the rival USRRC Can-Am championship, the 333 SP finally managed to take the Daytona 24 Hours crown.

Starting from 1999, the car found its niche in the European races, as the newly introduced American Le Mans Series saw factory-backed Audi and BMW entries dominating against privateer Ferraris. The cars were consistently outclassed in the ALMS races, and in 2000 Doran Racing even fit a Judd engine in an attempt to stay competitive. However, across the Atlantic, the 333 SP was the car to own, and in 1999, Collard and Sospiri renewed their ISRS title, edging out Christian Pescatori, who won the following year, with David Terrien, making it three championships in a row for the JMB Racing-entered Ferrari.

As the 333 SP became outdated in chassis, engine and aerodynamics, it gradually disappeared from international sports car racing. In 2001, no Ferrari prototype raced in the ALMS, although the Risi Competizione car made a few appearances in Grand-Am and Doran Racing's Judd-powered chassis won the 2001 6 Hours of Watkins Glen, while in Europe, Marco Zadra won the 2001 FIA Sportscar Championship but the car was not as dominant as it had once been.

In 2002, the 333 SP was absent from the championship, but made a few appearances the following year, powered by a Judd engine, at the hands of Giovanni Lavaggi's GLV-Brums team. The 333 SP's final appearance was at the 2003 500km of Monza.

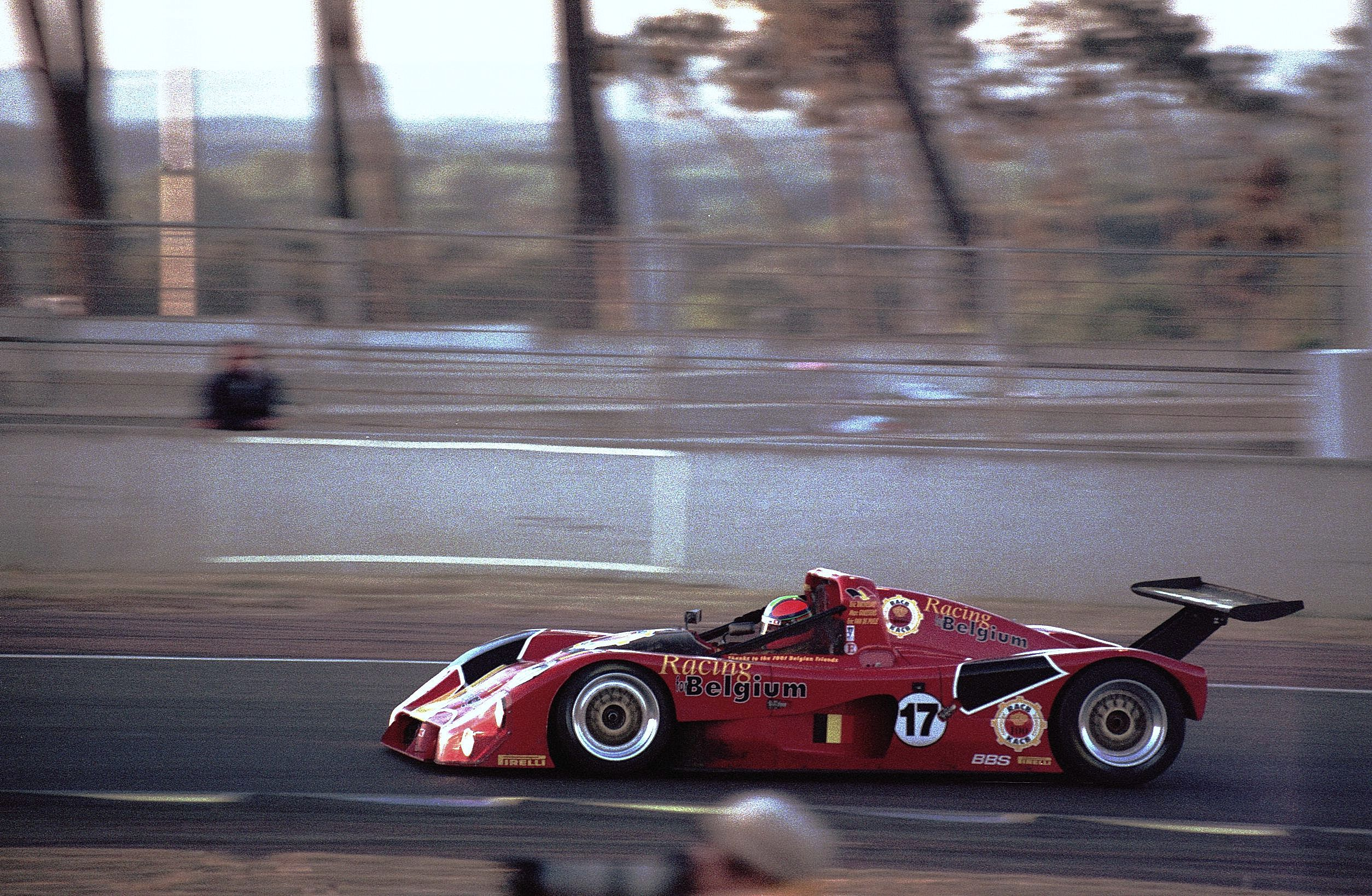
Ferrari 333 SP at the 1996 24 Hours of Le Mans

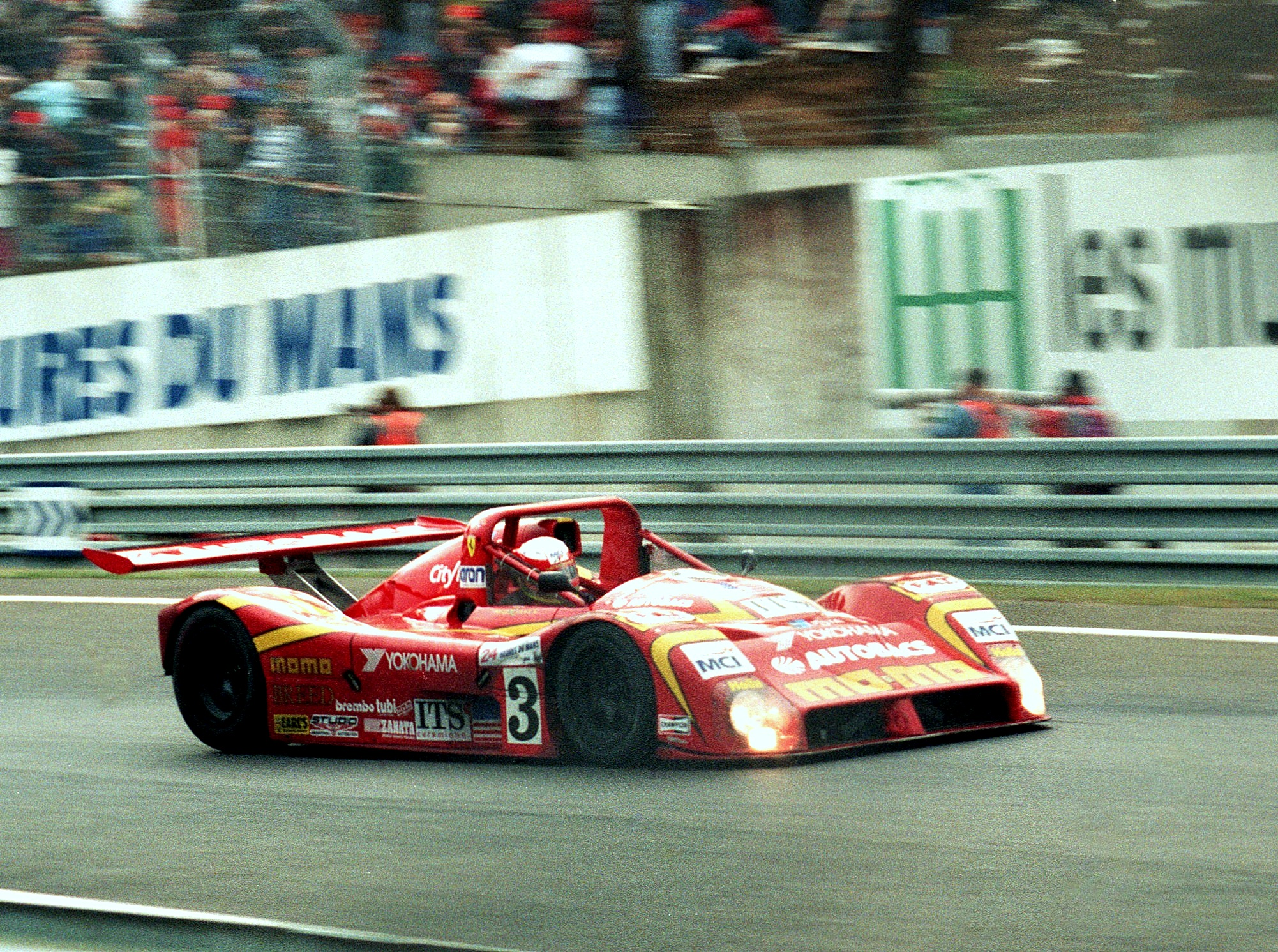
Ferrari 333 SP at the 1997 24 Hours of Le Mans

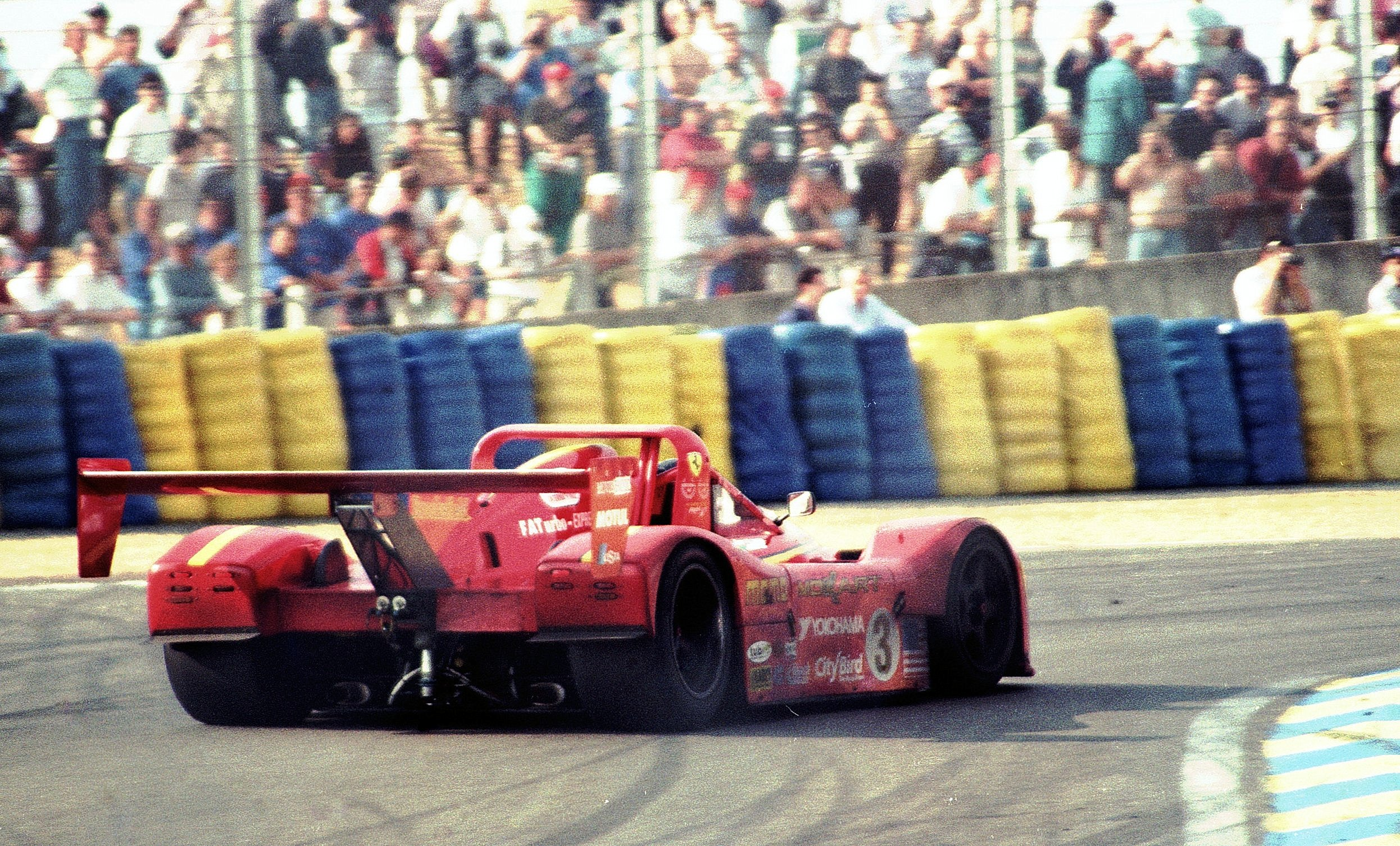
Ferrari 333 SP at the 1998 24 Hours of Le Mans

=== Complete 24 Hours of Le Mans results ===
Year	Entrant	No	Drivers	Class	Laps	Pos.	Class Pos.
1995	(United States) Euromotorsport Racing	1 img	(Italy) Massimo Sigala (United States) Jay Cochran (France) René Arnoux	LM-WSC	7 (3hr)	DNF (electrics)	
1996	(United States) Team Scandia; Racing For Belgium	17 img img	(Belgium) Eric van de Poele (Belgium) Marc Goossens (Belgium) Éric Bachelart	IMSA-WSC	208 (16hr)	DNF (accident)	
1996	(United States) Team Scandia (United States) Rocketsports Racing	18 img	(United States) Andy Evans (Spain) Fermín Vélez (France) Yvan Muller	IMSA-WSC	31 (4hr)	DNF (out of fuel)	
1997	(Italy) Moretti Racing Inc.	3 img img	(Italy) Gianpiero Moretti (Belgium) Didier Theys (Italy) Max Papis	LMP	321	6th	3rd
1997	(France) Pilot Racing	4 img img	(France) Michel Ferté (Spain) Adrián Campos (United States) Charlie Nearburg	LMP	18 (3hr)	DNF (out of fuel)	
1998	(United States) Doyle-Risi Racing	12 img img	(South Africa) Wayne Taylor (Belgium) Eric van de Poele (Spain) Fermín Vélez	LMP1	332	8th	1st
1998	(United States) Moretti Racing Inc.	3 img img	(Italy) Gianpiero Moretti (Italy) Mauro Baldi (Belgium) Didier Theys	LMP1	311	14th	3rd
1998	(France) Pilot Racing	10 img img	(France) Michel Ferté (France) Pascal Fabre (France) François Migault	LMP1	203 (17hr)	DNF (gearbox)	
1998	(France) Jabouille-Boursche	5 img img	(Italy) Vincenzo Sospiri (France) Jean-Christophe Boullion (France) Jérôme Policand	LMP1	187 (13hr)	DNF (gearbox)	

=== Complete IMSA GT Championship results ===
Year	Entrant	No	Drivers	1	2	3	4	5	6	7	8	9
Year	Entrant	No	Drivers	DAY	SEB	ATL	LRP	WGI	IND	MTY	POR	PHX
1994	Momo	30	(Italy) Gianpiero Moretti			2	1	1	1	DNS	2	2
1994	Momo	30	(Chile) Eliseo Salazar	2		2	1	1	1		2	2
1994	Euromotorsport	5	(Italy) Mauro Baldi			Ret	Ret					
1994	Euromotorsport	50	(United States) Jay Cochran			1	2		DNS	5		Ret
1994	Euromotorsport	50	(United Kingdom) Russell Spence							5		
1994	Team Scandia	3	(Canada) Ross Bentley			5						
1994	Team Scandia	3	(United States) Andy Evans			5	3	Ret	2	1	Ret	5
1994	Team Scandia	3	(United States) Charles Morgan				3					
1994	Team Scandia	3	(United States) Eddie Cheever					Ret				
1994	Team Scandia	3	(Spain) Fermín Vélez						2	1	Ret	5
1994	Team Scandia	50	(Italy) Mauro Baldi					Ret				
1994	Team Scandia	50	(United States) Jay Cochran					Ret				

== Bibliography ==
- Cook, Earl; Cook, Gail (1996). A close look – the Ferrari 333 SP. Covers '94 – '96. Clearwater: American Racing.
- Seibert, Dirk; Carrieri, Peter (1999). Ferrari 333 SP (in German). Vol. 13. Stuttgart: Motor Buch Verlag. ISBN 978-3-613-01965-2.
- O'Neil, Terry (2015). Ferrari 333 SP. WSC Giants Series. Veloce Publishing. ISBN 978-1-84584-758-6.
- O'Neil, Terry (2020). Ferrari 333 SP: A Pictorial History 1993–2003. Dalton Watson Fine Books. ISBN 978-1-85443-305-3.
