= Fredy Lienhard =

Swiss racing driver (born 1947)

Fredy Lienhard, Sr. (born 14 September 1947 in Herisau) is a Swiss racing driver.

In 1968, Lienhard founded Lista Racing, and throughout the 1970s and 1980s, he competed in Formula Vee and Formula Two. In 1993 and 1994, he moved to sports car racing competing in a Lola Can-Am car in Interserie division 2. In 1995, he acquired a Ferrari 333 SP and began racing in the European Sportscar Championship and IMSA GT Championship with teammate Didier Theys, winning the 24 Hours of Zolder in 1997. He moved to the American Le Mans Series in 1999. In 2002, he moved to the Rolex Sports Car Series SRP class with a new Judd powered Dallara SP1 and won the 2002 24 Hours of Daytona with teammates Theys, Mauro Baldi and Max Papis. In 2003, he competed in only two races due to a busy business schedule but began racing more regularly again in 2006 and 2007 competing in select ALMS and Le Mans Series races and continued to do so in 2008.

Lienhard resides in Niederteufen and is the owner of Lista Office LO and Alid Finanz AG, a manufacturer of office furniture. His son Fredy Lienhard, Jr. is also a racing driver. He sponsors the Formula Lista Junior and Formula Renault 2.0 Switzerland single-seater series.

== Racing record ==
=== Complete European Formula Two Championship results ===
(key) (Races in bold indicate pole position; races in italics indicate fastest lap)

Year	Entrant	Chassis	Engine	1	2	3	4	5	6	7	8	9	10	11	12	Pos.	Pts
1983	Horag Hotz Racing	March	BMW	SIL	THR	HOC	NÜR	VAL	PAU	JAR	DON	MIS; 6	PER; 10	ZOL	MUG	23rd	1
