= FIA Sportscar Championship =

Sports car racing series

The FIA Sportscar Championship was a sports car racing series created by John Mangoletsi and got the approval of the Fédération Internationale de l'Automobile (FIA) in 2001. It was a series similar to the FIA GT Championship, concentrating on two classes of open-cockpit sports prototypes in endurance races mostly around Europe. The series was folded after the 2003 season.

== History ==
Following the demise of the World Sportscar Championship in 1992, Europe was left without a major sportscar series. In the United States however, attempts were underway to recreate the glory of the World Sportscar Championship with the IMSA GTP series returning to cheaper, open-cockpit sportscars to replace their highly technological and expensive closed-cockpit sportscars that were similar to those used in the World Sportscar Championship at its end. Following on this successful formula, in 1997 John Mangoletsi developed the International Sports Racing Series, a European-based series for open-cockpit sportscars. It would be supported by major teams like Rafanelli, Riley & Scott, Kremer Racing, Joest Racing and Konrad Motorsport and by manufacturers such as Ferrari, which was having success with its new 333 SP sports racer.

The International Sports Racing Series was open to Sportscars complying with either FIA SR1 or FIA SR2 regulations. The SR1 class was for cars with engines limited to a maximum capacity of 6000cc if naturally aspirated or 4000cc if supercharged. The SR2 class was for cars with production based engines limited to a maximum of six cylinders and a maximum capacity of 3000cc. The SR1 cars were similar to those contesting the LMP Class in the 24 Hours of Le Mans while the SR2 cars were similar to cars in the CN class as used in hillclimb events. In 1999, the series was officially recognized by the FIA and renamed the Sports Racing World Cup. Ferrari's success with the 333SP was proven with a large number of entrants making it the chassis of choice in SR1, while Riley & Scott, Lola, and other manufacturers attempted to overcome the dominant marque, Ferrari.

In 2001, the series was officially taken over by the FIA and renamed as the FIA Sportscar Championship and it continued to expand into new markets, including a partnership with Grand-Am Road Racing in the United States. This partnership involved sharing races and eventually, common regulations. With the creation of the American Le Mans Series in 1999 and the European Le Mans Series in 2001, the FIA Sportscar Championship found it increasingly difficult to attract top teams and manufacturers. Grand-Am Road Racing changed to adapt to this shift in sportscar design by dropping the SRP1 class and phasing out the SRP2 class (eliminated in 2004) in 2003 in favor of adopting its own rulebook for prototype closed-top race cars built on inexpensive tube-frame chassis known as Daytona Prototype, named for the former sanctioning body's base close to Daytona International Speedway. By that time, the FIA Sportscar Championship was suffering from a decline in entries, leading to its demise at the end of the 2003 season. The FIA chose instead to back the new Le Mans Endurance Series that debuted in 2004, ensuring the continuation of Sportscar racing in Europe.

== Champions ==
	SR1 Drivers	SR2 Drivers
	SR1 Constructors	SR2 Constructors
	SR1 Teams	SR2 Teams
1997 International Sports Racing Series	Titles not awarded	
1998 International Sports Racing Series	(France) Emmanuel Collard (Italy) Vincenzo Sospiri	(France) Jean-Claude de Castelli
1998 International Sports Racing Series	Title not awarded	Title not awarded
1998 International Sports Racing Series	(France) JB Giesse Team Ferrari	(France) Waterair Sport
1999 Sports Racing World Cup	(France) Emmanuel Collard (Italy) Vincenzo Sospiri	(Italy) Angelo Lancelotti
1999 Sports Racing World Cup	Title not awarded	Title not awarded
1999 Sports Racing World Cup	(France) JB Giesse Team Ferrari	(Italy) Cauduro Tampolli Team
2000 Sports Racing World Cup	(Italy) Christian Pescatori (France) David Terrien	(United Kingdom) Peter Owen (United Kingdom) Mark Smithson
2000 Sports Racing World Cup	Title not awarded	Title not awarded
2000 Sports Racing World Cup	(France) JMB Giesse Team Ferrari	(United Kingdom) Redman Bright
2001 FIA Sportscar Championship	(Italy) Marco Zadra	(United States) Larry Oberto (Sweden) Thed Björk
2001 FIA Sportscar Championship	(Italy) Ferrari	(United Kingdom) Lola Cars International
2001 FIA Sportscar Championship	(Italy) BMS Scuderia Italia	SportsRacing Team Sweden
2002 FIA Sportscar Championship	(Netherlands) Jan Lammers (Netherlands) Val Hillebrand	(Italy) Mirko Savoldi (Italy) Piergiuseppe Peroni
2002 FIA Sportscar Championship	(Japan) Dome	(Italy) Lucchini Engineering
2002 FIA Sportscar Championship	(Netherlands) Racing for Holland	(Italy) Lucchini Engineering
2003 FIA Sportscar Championship	(Netherlands) Jan Lammers (Netherlands) John Bosch	(Italy) Mirko Savoldi (Italy) Piergiuseppe Peroni
2003 FIA Sportscar Championship	(Japan) Dome	(Italy) Lucchini Engineering
2003 FIA Sportscar Championship	(Netherlands) Racing for Holland	(Italy) Lucchini Engineering

== See also ==
- European Le Mans Series
- World Sportscar Championship
- FIA GT Championship
