= Emmanuel Collard =

French racing driver (born 1971)

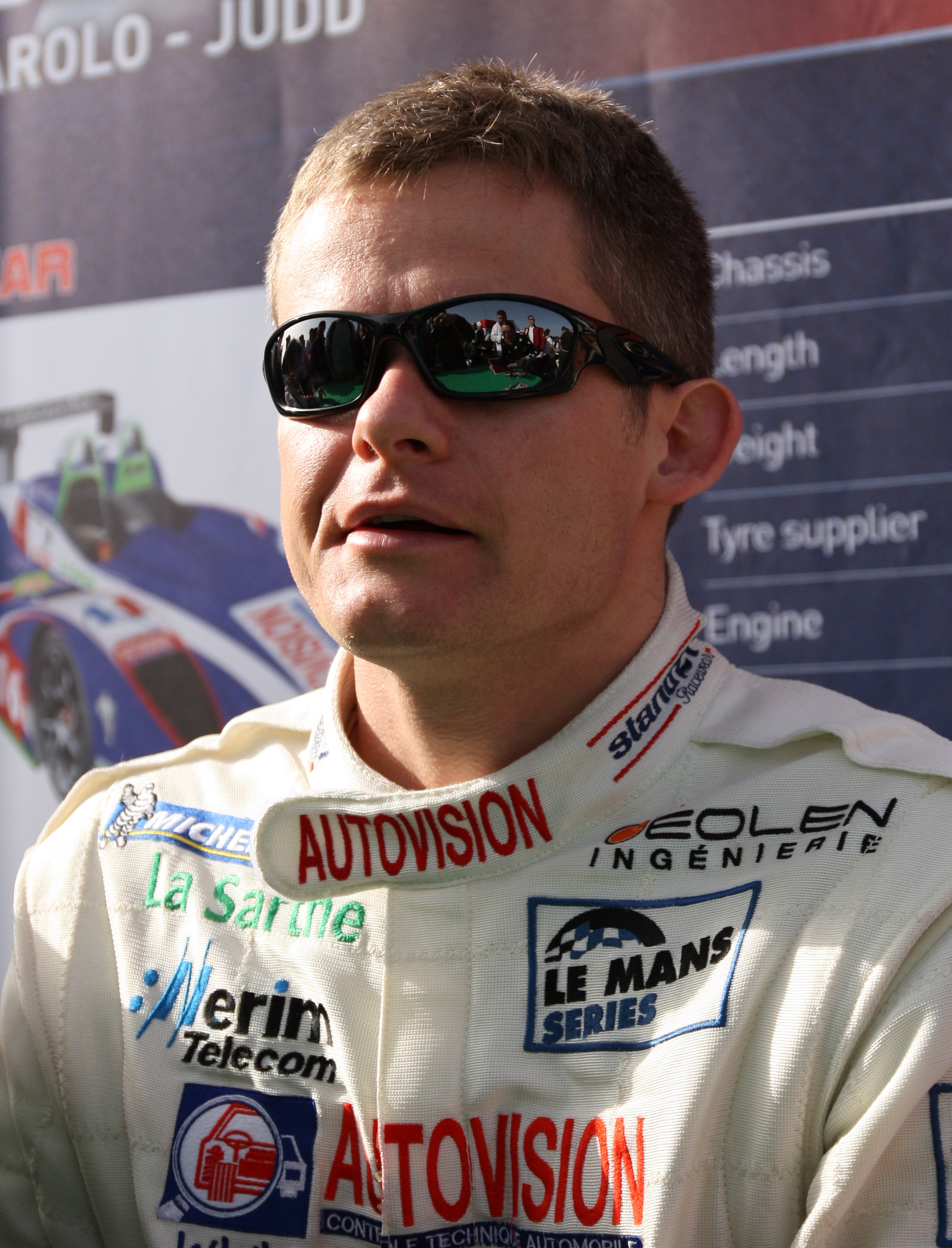
- Collard in 2011
- Nationality: (France) French
- Born: 3 April 1971 (age 55)
- Categorisation: FIA Platinum (until 2017); FIA Gold (2018–2021); FIA Silver (2022–)

24 Hours of Le Mans career
- Years: 1995–2022
- Teams: Larbre Compétition, La Filière, Porsche AG, Toyota Motorsport (Toyota Team Europe), DAMS, Team Cadillac, Alex Job Racing, Pescarolo Sport, Team Essex, Corvette Racing, Prospeed Competition, AF Corse, TDS Racing, Team Penske
- Best finish: 2nd (2005)
- Class wins: 1 (2003, 2009)

Emmanuel Collard (born 3 April 1971) is a French professional racing driver. He is a former member of the Porsche Junioren factory team, but also drives for other marques.

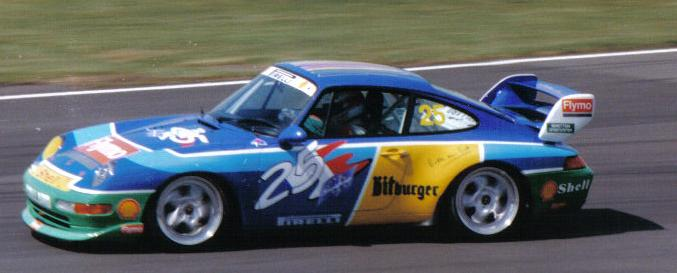
Collard driving in the Porsche Supercup in 1995. His car's livery reflects his role as the Benetton Formula One team's test driver.

Born in Arpajon, Essonne, Collard is the winner of the Le Mans Series for Pescarolo Sport in 2005 and 2006 with Jean-Christophe Boullion and in 2011 with Julien Jousse. He also won the 1998 and 1999 Sports Racing World Cup, and the 2008 12 Hours of Sebring overall in Penske Racing's Porsche RS Spyder Evo LMP2 alongside Timo Bernhard and Romain Dumas.

Collard also was the Formula One test driver for Prost Grand Prix in 1997, Benetton in the late 1990s, and Ligier-Ford in 1990.

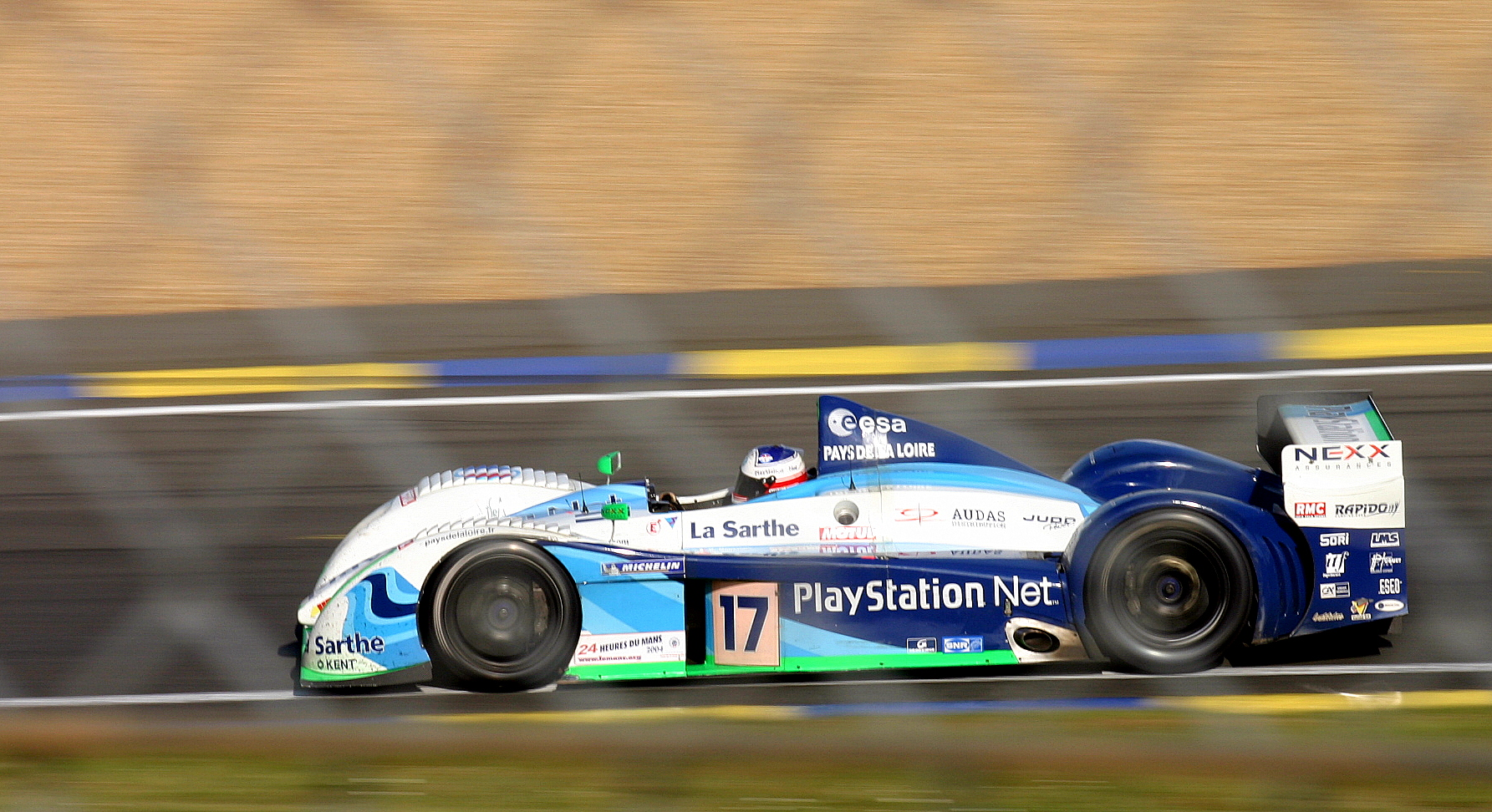
Collard starred for Pescarolo in LMP1, winning three Le Mans Series titles, two Le Mans 24h podiums and pole in 2005.

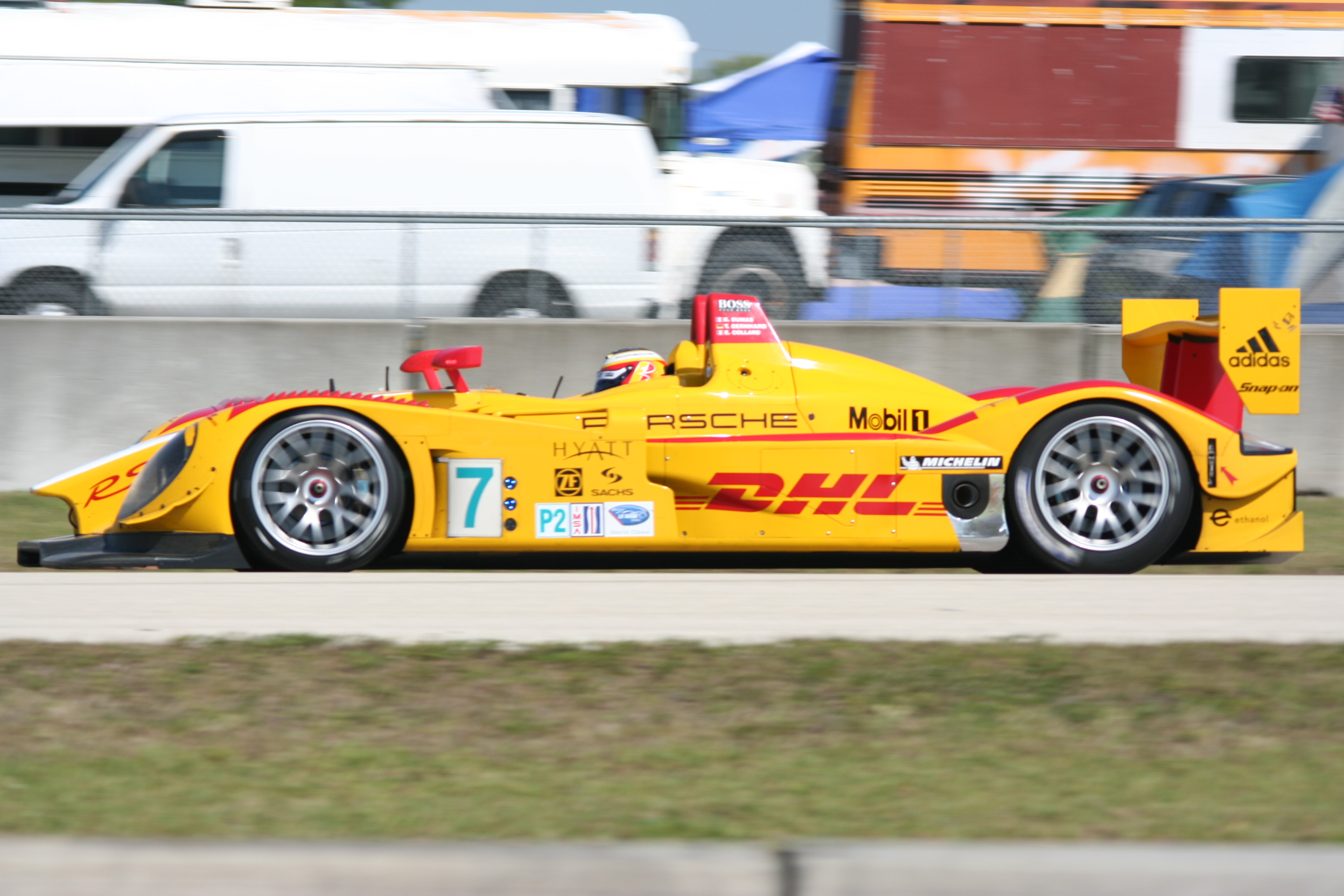
Collard won the 2008 Sebring 12h overall in the Penske Porsche LMP2.

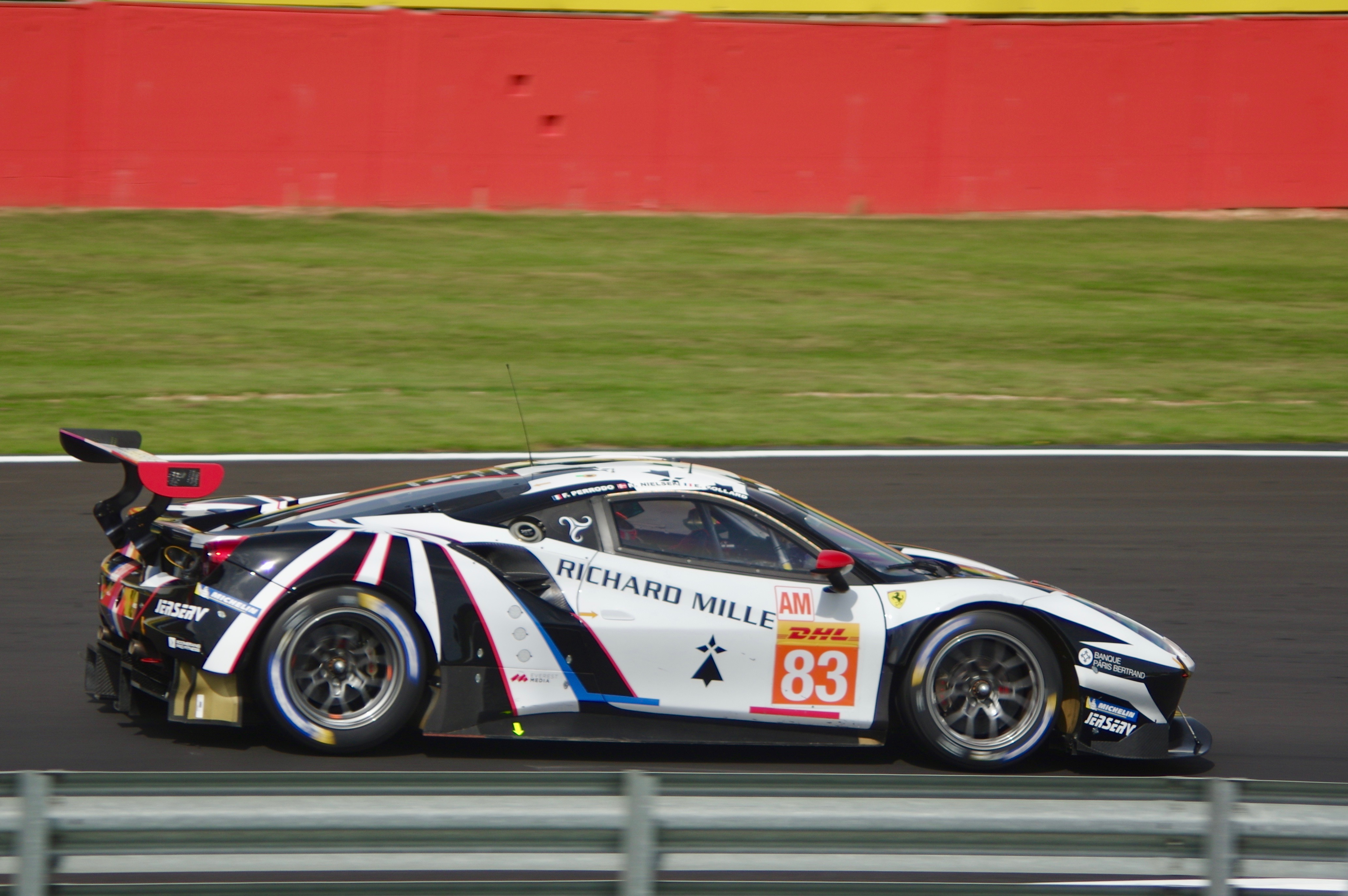
Collard at the wheel of his AF Corse Ferrari 488 at Silverstone in 2019.

== Racing record ==
=== Complete International Formula 3000 results ===
(key) (Races in bold indicate pole position) (Races in italics indicate fastest lap)

Year	Entrant	1	2	3	4	5	6	7	8	9	10	DC	Points
1991	Apomatox	VAL	PAU	JER	MUG	PER	HOC	BRH	SPA	BUG; Ret	NOG; Ret	NC	0
1992	Apomatox	SIL; Ret	PAU; Ret	CAT; 4	PER; Ret	HOC; 12	NÜR; 4	SPA; DNQ	ALB; 3	NOG; 15	MAG; 4	8th	13
1993	Apomatox	DON; 10	SIL; Ret	PAU; Ret	PER; 9	HOC; Ret	NÜR; 8	SPA; 8	**MAG**; Ret	NOG; 3		12th	4

=== 24 Hours of Le Mans results ===
Year	Team	Co-Drivers	Car	Class	Laps	Pos.	Class Pos.
1995	(France) Larbre Compétition	(France) Dominique Dupuy (France) Stéphane Ortelli	Porsche 911 GT2 Evo	GT1	82	DNF	DNF
1996	(France) La Filière Elf	(France) Henri Pescarolo (France) Franck Lagorce	Courage C36-Porsche	LMP1	327	7th	**2nd**
1997	(Germany) Porsche AG	(Germany) Ralf Kelleners (France) Yannick Dalmas	Porsche 911 GT1	GT1	327	DNF	DNF
1998	(Japan) Toyota Motorsports (Germany) Toyota Team Europe	(United Kingdom) Martin Brundle (France) Éric Hélary	Toyota GT-One	GT1	191	DNF	DNF
1999	(Japan) Toyota Motorsports (Germany) Toyota Team Europe	(United Kingdom) Martin Brundle (Italy) Vincenzo Sospiri	Toyota GT-One	LMGTP	90	DNF	DNF
2000	(France) Team DAMS	(France) Éric Bernard (France) Franck Montagny	Cadillac Northstar LMP	LMP900	300	19th	9th
2001	(France) DAMS	(France) Éric Bernard (Belgium) Marc Goossens	Cadillac Northstar LMP01	LMP900	56	DNF	DNF
2002	(United States) Team Cadillac	(France) Éric Bernard (Finland) JJ Lehto	Cadillac Northstar LMP02	LMP900	334	12th	10th
2003	(United States) Alex Job Racing (United States) Petersen Motorsports	(Germany) Sascha Maassen (Germany) Lucas Luhr	Porsche 911 GT3-RS	GT	320	14th	**1st**
2004	(France) Pescarolo Sport	(France) Sébastien Bourdais (France) Nicolas Minassian	Pescarolo C60-Judd	LMP1	282	DNF	DNF
2005	(France) Pescarolo Sport	(France) Jean-Christophe Boullion (France) Érik Comas	Pescarolo C60 Hybrid-Judd	LMP1	368	**2nd**	**2nd**
2006	(France) Pescarolo Sport	(France) Érik Comas (France) Nicolas Minassian	Pescarolo C60 Hybrid-Judd	LMP1	352	5th	4th
2007	(France) Pescarolo Sport	(France) Jean-Christophe Boullion (France) Romain Dumas	Pescarolo 01-Judd	LMP1	358	**3rd**	**3rd**
2008	(France) Pescarolo Sport	(France) Jean-Christophe Boullion (France) Romain Dumas	Pescarolo 01-Judd	LMP1	238	DNF	DNF
2009	(Denmark) Team Essex	(Denmark) Casper Elgaard (Denmark) Kristian Poulsen	Porsche RS Spyder Evo	LMP2	357	10th	**1st**
2010	(United States) Corvette Racing	(United Kingdom) Oliver Gavin (Monaco) Olivier Beretta	Chevrolet Corvette C6.R	GT2	255	DNF	DNF
2011	(France) Pescarolo Team	(France) Christophe Tinseau (France) Julien Jousse	Pescarolo 01-Judd	LMP1	305	DNF	DNF
2012	(France) Pescarolo Team	(United Kingdom) Stuart Hall	Pescarolo 03-Judd	LMP1	20	DNF	DNF
2013	(Belgium) Prospeed Competition	(France) François Perrodo (France) Sébastien Crubilé	Porsche 911 GT3 RSR	GTE; Am	298	36th	9th
2014	(Belgium) Prospeed Competition	(France) François Perrodo (Finland) Markus Palttala	Porsche 911 GT3 RSR	GTE; Am	194	DNF	DNF
2015	(Italy) AF Corse	(Portugal) Rui Águas (France) François Perrodo	Ferrari 458 Italia GT2	GTE; Am	330	26th	4th
2016	(Italy) AF Corse	(Portugal) Rui Águas (France) François Perrodo	Ferrari 458 Italia GT2	GTE; Am	331	27th	**2nd**
2017	(France) TDS Racing	(France) François Perrodo (France) Matthieu Vaxivière	Oreca 07-Gibson	LMP2	213	DNF	DNF
2020	(Italy) AF Corse	(Denmark) Nicklas Nielsen (France) François Perrodo	Ferrari 488 GTE Evo	GTE; Am	339	26th	**3rd**
2022	(United States) Team Penske	(United States) Dane Cameron (Brazil) Felipe Nasr	Oreca 07-Gibson	LMP2	368	9th	5th

=== Complete European Le Mans Series results ===
(key) (Races in bold indicate pole position; races in italics indicate fastest lap)

Year	Entrant	Class	Car	Engine	1	2	3	4	5	6	7	Pos.	Points
2001	Alex Job Racing	GT	Porsche 911 GT3-RS	Porsche 3.6L Flat-6	**SEB**; 1	DON	JAR; 3	EST	MOS	VAL	PET	19th	49
2004	Pescarolo Sport	LMP1	Pescarolo C60	Judd GV5 5.0L V10	MNZ; 4	NÜR	SIL	SPA				19th	5
2005	Pescarolo Sport	LMP1	Pescarolo C60 Hybrid	Judd GV5 5.0L V10	**SPA**; 2	MNZ; 1	SIL; 8	NÜR; 4	**IST**; 1			1st	34
2006	Pescarolo Sport	LMP1	Pescarolo C60 Hybrid	Judd GV5 S2 5.0L V10	**IST**; 1	SPA; 1	NÜR; 1	DON; 1	**JAR**; 1			1st	50
2007	Pescarolo Sport	LMP1	Pescarolo 01	Judd GV5.5 S2 5.5 L V10	MNZ; 2	VAL	NÜR; 3	SPA; 2	SIL; 2	INT; 4		6th	32.5
2008	Pescarolo Sport	LMP1	Pescarolo 01	Judd GV5.5 S2 5.5 L V10	CAT; 4	MNZ; Ret	SPA; 5	NÜR; Ret	SIL			16th	9
2009	Team Essex	LMP2	Porsche RS Spyder Evo	Porsche MR6 3.4 L V8	CAT	**SPA**; 1	ALG					16th	11
2009	Pescarolo Sport	LMP1	Pescarolo 01	Judd GV5.5 S2 5.5 L V10				NÜR; Ret	SIL			NC	0
2011	Pescarolo Sport	LMP1	Pescarolo 01 Evo	Judd GV5 S2 5.0 L V10	LEC; 1	SPA; 6	IMO; 7	SIL; 6	EST; 1			1st	50
2013	Prospeed Competition	LMGTE	Porsche 997 GT3-RSR	Porsche 4.0 L Flat-6	SIL; 5	IMO	RBR; 5	HUN; 4	LEC; 6			8th	40
2014	Crubilé Sport	LMGTE	Porsche 997 GT3 RSR	Porsche 4.0 L Flat-6	SIL; 8	IMO; 10						18th	13
2014	AF Corse	LMGTE	Ferrari F458 Italia	Ferrari 4.5 L V8			RBR; 8	LEC; Ret	EST; 8			18th	13
2020	AF Corse	LMGTE	Ferrari 488 GTE Evo	Ferrari F154CB 3.9 L Turbo V8	LEC	SPA; 2	LEC	MNZ	ALG; 8			NC	0
2021	AF Corse	LMGTE	Ferrari 488 GTE Evo	Ferrari F154CB 3.9 L Turbo V8	CAT; WD	**RBR**; 1	LEC; 3	MNZ; 3	SPA; 1	ALG; 10		3rd	83
2024	AF Corse	LMGT3	Ferrari 296 GT3	Ferrari F163 3.0 L Turbo V6	CAT; 8	LEC; 6	IMO; 6	SPA; 3	MUG; 4	ALG; Ret		8th	47

=== Complete FIA World Endurance Championship results ===
Year	Entrant	Class	Car	Engine	1	2	3	4	5	6	7	8	9	Rank	Points
2012	Pescarolo Team	LMP1	Pescarolo 01	Judd GV5 S2 5.0 L V10	SEB; 5	SPA								29th	10
2012	Pescarolo Team	LMP1	Pescarolo 03	Judd DB 3.4 L V8			LMS; Ret	SIL	SÃO	BHR	FUJ	SHA		29th	10
2013	Prospeed Competition	LMGTE Am	Porsche 997 GT3-RSR	Porsche 4.0 L Flat-6	SIL	SPA	LMS; 9	SÃO	COA	FUJ	SHA			22nd	15
2013	AF Corse	LMGTE Am	Ferrari 458 Italia GT2	Ferrari 4.5 L V8								BHR; 3		22nd	15
2014	Prospeed Competition	LMGTE Am	Porsche 997 GT3-RSR	Porsche 4.0 L Flat-6	SIL; Ret	SPA; 6	LMS; Ret							9th	58
2014	Prospeed Competition	LMGTE Am	Porsche 911 RSR	Porsche 4.0 L Flat-6				**COA**; 7	FUJ; 3	SHA; 4	BHR; 7	SÃO; 5		9th	58
2015	AF Corse	LMGTE Am	Ferrari 458 Italia GT2	Ferrari 4.5 L V8	SIL; 2	SPA; 2	LMS; 3	NÜR; 3	COA; 3	FUJ; 3	SHA; 1	BHR; 4		2nd	148
2016	AF Corse	LMGTE Am	Ferrari 458 Italia GT2	Ferrari 4.5 L V8	SIL; 1	SPA; 2	LMS; 1	NÜR; 2	MEX; 2	COA; 6	FUJ; 2	SHA; 2	BHR; 3	1st	188
2017	TDS Racing	LMP2	Oreca 07	Gibson GK428 4.2 L V8	SIL; 3	SPA; 9	LMS; Ret	NÜR; 8	MEX; 7	COA; 7	FUJ; 4	SHA; 6	BHR; 9	14th	55
2019–20	AF Corse	LMGTE Am	Ferrari 488 GTE Evo	Ferrari F154CB 3.9 L Turbo V8	SIL; 1	FUJ; 2	SHA; 4	BHR; 4	COA; 4	SPA; 1	LMS; 3	BHR; 2		1st	167
2022	Team Penske	LMP2	Oreca 07	Gibson GK428 4.2 L V8	SEB; 8	SPA; 4	LMS; 4	MNZ	FUJ	BHR				10th	42

^{*} Season still in progress.

Sporting positions
Preceded by Olivier Panis	Championnat de France Formula Renault 2.0; Champion; 1990	Succeeded by Olivier Couvreur
Preceded by Jean-Pierre Malcher	Porsche Supercup; Champion; 1996	Succeeded by Patrick Huisman
Preceded by Inaugural	FIA Sportscar Championship; Champion; 1998 and 1999; With: Vincenzo Sospiri	Succeeded by Christian Pescatori; David Terrien
Preceded by Johnny Herbert; Jamie Davies	Le Mans Series; Champion; 2005 and 2006; With: Jean-Christophe Boullion	Succeeded by Stéphane Sarrazin; Pedro Lamy
Preceded by Stéphane Sarrazin	Le Mans Series; Champion; 2011; With: Julien Jousse	Succeeded by Mathias Beche; Pierre Thiriet
Preceded by Andrea Bertolini; Aleksey Basov; Viktor Shaitar	FIA Endurance Trophy for LMGTE Am Drivers; 2016; With: François Perrodo & Rui Águas	Succeeded by Pedro Lamy; Mathias Lauda; Paul Dalla Lana
Preceded by Jörg Bergmeister; Patrick Lindsey; Egidio Perfetti	FIA Endurance Trophy for LMGTE Am Drivers; 2019-20; With: François Perrodo & Nicklas Nielsen	Succeeded by Nicklas Nielsen; François Perrodo; Alessio Rovera
