= Autodrom Most =

Motor racing circuit in Czech Republic

- Full Circuit (2005–present)
- Location: Most, Czech Republic
- Coordinates: 50°31′21″N 13°36′2″E
- Capacity: 150,000
- FIA Grade: 2
- Broke ground: 1978
- Opened: 1983
- Major events: Current: World SBK (2021–present); FIA European Truck Racing Czech Truck Prix (1993–present); NASCAR Euro Series (2019, 2021–present); TCR Eastern Europe (2022–present); Formula 4 CEZ Championship (2023–present); Former: WTCR Race of the Czech Republic (2021); FIM EWC 6 Hours of Most (2021); Sidecar World Championship (1997–1998, 2023–2025); ADAC GT Masters (2018–2019); European Touring Car Cup (2017); ELMS (2001); Cup of Peace and Friendship (1984–1986, 1988–1989)
- Website: http://www.autodrom-most.cz

Full Circuit (2005–present)
- Length: 4.212 km (2.617 mi)
- Turns: 21
- Race lap record: 1:22.981 ( (Germany) Bernd Herndlhofer, Arrows A22, 2020, F1)

Original Circuit (1983–2004)
- Length: 4.149 km (2.578 mi)
- Turns: 20
- Race lap record: 1:16.162 ( (Austria) Josef Neuhauser, Minardi M190, 2000, Interserie)

Autodrom Most is a hard-surfaced 4.212 km (2.617 mi) long race track for motorsport outside of the city of Most in the northwest of the Czech Republic. The racing circuit was built between 1978 and 1983, but the Most district was known for organizing motorcycle and car races earlier. Autodrome is used for races of cars, trucks, motorcycles and free circuit rides, but also for test rides of developed cars, training of drivers of fire engines, ambulance and police cars, as well as training of drivers in crisis situations, etc.

In April 2021, the Most round was announced as being added into the Superbike World Championship series with a five-year agreement.

In August 2021, Autodrom Most was announced as one of the replacement circuits for the WTCR in the 2021 season; and in November 2021, it was announced that Autodrom Most would be permanently included in the 2022 race calendar. But on 19 March 2022, it was announced that Czech round was cancelled due to the state of emergency and logistical issues.

== Events ==
Current

- April: Histo-Cup Austria Season Opening Most
- May: Superbike World Championship, Supersport World Championship, Sportbike World Championship, VFV Großer Preis der Stadt Most
- June: IDM Superbike Championship
- July: Formula Student Czech
- August: FIA European Truck Racing Championship Czech Truck Prix, NASCAR Euro Series NASCAR GP Czechia - Autodrom Most NASCAR Show, TCR Eastern Europe Touring Car Series, Formula 4 CEZ Championship, GT Cup Series

Future

- FIM Women's Circuit Racing World Championship (2027)

Former

- ADAC GT Masters (2018–2019)
- ADAC TCR Germany Touring Car Championship (2018–2019)
- Austria Formula 3 Cup (1994–2008, 2010–2016, 2018–2019)
- Cup of Peace and Friendship (1984–1986, 1988–1989)
- EuroBOSS Series (2002)
- European Touring Car Cup (2017)
- FIM Endurance World Championship
  - 6 Hours of Most (2021)
- FIM Superbike European Championship (1990–1991, 1994–1996)
- Formula König (2004)
- Formula Renault 2.0 Middle European Championship (2004, 2006–2008, 2010)
- Formula Renault Northern European Cup (2009–2014)
- German Formula Three Championship (1991)
- GT4 Central European Cup (2018)
- IMSA European Le Mans Series
  - ELMS at Most (2001)
- Interserie (1983–2003)
- MAXX Formula (2020–2021)
- Northern Talent Cup (2022–2025)
- Porsche Carrera Cup Germany (2019)
- Sidecar World Championship (1997–1998, 2023–2025)
- Supersport 300 World Championship (2021–2025)
- World Touring Car Cup
  - FIA WTCR Race of the Czech Republic (2021)

== Lap records ==
As of August 2026, the fastest official race lap records at the Autodrom Most are listed as:

Category	Time	Driver	Vehicle	Event
Full Circuit (2005–present): 4.212 km (2.617 mi)
Formula One	1:22.981	Bernd Herndlhofer	Arrows A22	2020 MAXX Formula MAXX GP Czech Republic
Formula Three	1:28.795	Akash Nandy	Dallara F308	2015 Most Austria F3 Cup round
LMP3	1:29.634	Miro Konôpka	Ligier JS P320	2025 Most FIA CEZ Endurance round
World SBK	1:29.920	Nicolò Bulega	Ducati Panigale V4 R	2026 Most World SBK round
GT3	1:30.840	Filip Salaquarda	Audi R8 LMS GT3 Evo	2023 Most ESET V4 Cup round
Lamborghini Super Trofeo	1:30.991	Adam Konôpka	Lamborghini Huracán LP 620-2 Super Trofeo EVO2	2025 Most GT Cup round
Formula Renault 2.0	1:31.547	Oliver Rowland	Tatuus FR2.0/13	2013 Most Formula Renault NEC round
SRO GT2	1:32.182	Marius Aigner	KTM X-Bow GT2	2025 Most FIA CEZ Endurance round
Formula 4	1:33.111	Teo Borenstein	Tatuus F4-T421	2026 Most Formula 4 CEZ Championship round
FIM EWC	1:33.875	Marvin Fritz	Yamaha YZF-R1	2021 6 Hours of Most
Porsche Carrera Cup	1:34.122	Arne Hoffmeister	Porsche 911 (992 I) GT3 Cup	2023 Most Porsche Sprint Challenge Central Europe round
World SSP	1:34.130	Jaume Masià	Ducati Panigale V2	2026 Most World SSP round
TCR Touring Car	1:39.503	Mikel Azcona	Cupra León Competicion TCR	2021 WTCR Race of Czech Republic
World SPB	1:39.556	Matteo Vannucci	Aprilia RS660 Factory	2026 Most World SPB round
GT4	1:39.911	Miroslav Mikeš	Mercedes-AMG GT4	2025 Most GT Cup round
Stock car racing	1:39.971	Thomas Toffel	Chevrolet Camaro EuroNASCAR	2026 Most NASCAR Euro Series round
SEAT León Supercopa	1:43.423	Christjohannes Schreiber	SEAT León Cupra R Mk2	2016 Most Eset Tourenwagen Cup round
Moto3	1:43.979	Robin Siegert	Honda NSF250R	2025 Most Northern Talent Cup round
Supersport 300	1.45.666	Carter Thompson	Kawasaki Ninja 400	2024 Most Supersport 300 round
250cc	1:46.530	Rossi Moor	KTM 250 FRR	2022 Most Northern Talent Cup round
Renault Clio Cup	1:49.412	Tomas Pekar	Renault Clio R.S. IV Cup	2020 Most Clio Cup Central Europe round
Truck racing	2:01.340	David Vršecký	Freightliner	2009 Most ETRC round
Super 1600	2:02.348	Martin Hlavna	Ford Fiesta ST	2017 Most FIA Central Europe Challenge round
Original Circuit (1983–2004): 4.149 km (2.578 mi)
Interserie	1:16.162	Josef Neuhauser	Minardi M190	2000 1st Most Interserie round
Group C	1:17.745	Robbie Stirling	Lola T92/10	1996 Most Interserie round
LMP900	1:21.025	Stefan Johansson	Audi R8	2001 ELMS at Most
Formula Three	1:21.025	Andre Fibier	Dallara F398	1999 1st Most Austria F3 Cup round
Group C2	1:21.643	Ranieri Randaccio	Spice SE90C	1993 Most Interserie round
LMP675	1:23.650	Jordi Gene	Reynard 2KQ	2001 ELMS at Most
GT1 (GTS)	1:29.006	Ian McKellar, Jr.	Saleen S7-R	2001 ELMS at Most
Superbike	1:30.957	Christer Lindholm	Yamaha YZF-R7	1999 Most IDM Superbike round
GT	1:33.205	Wolfgang Kaufmann	Porsche 911 (996) GT3-R	2001 ELMS at Most
Truck racing	1:50.260	Ludovic Faure	Mercedes-Benz Atego	2000 Most ETRC round
Street Circuit (1976–1982): 3.450 km (2.144 mi)
Group 6	1:16.760	Bob Wollek	Porsche 936/80	1982 Most Interserie round
Group 7	1:21.530	Peter Hoffmann	McLaren M8F Chevrolet	1979 Most Interserie round

== Gallery ==
Original Circuit (1983–2004)

Full Circuit (2005–present)

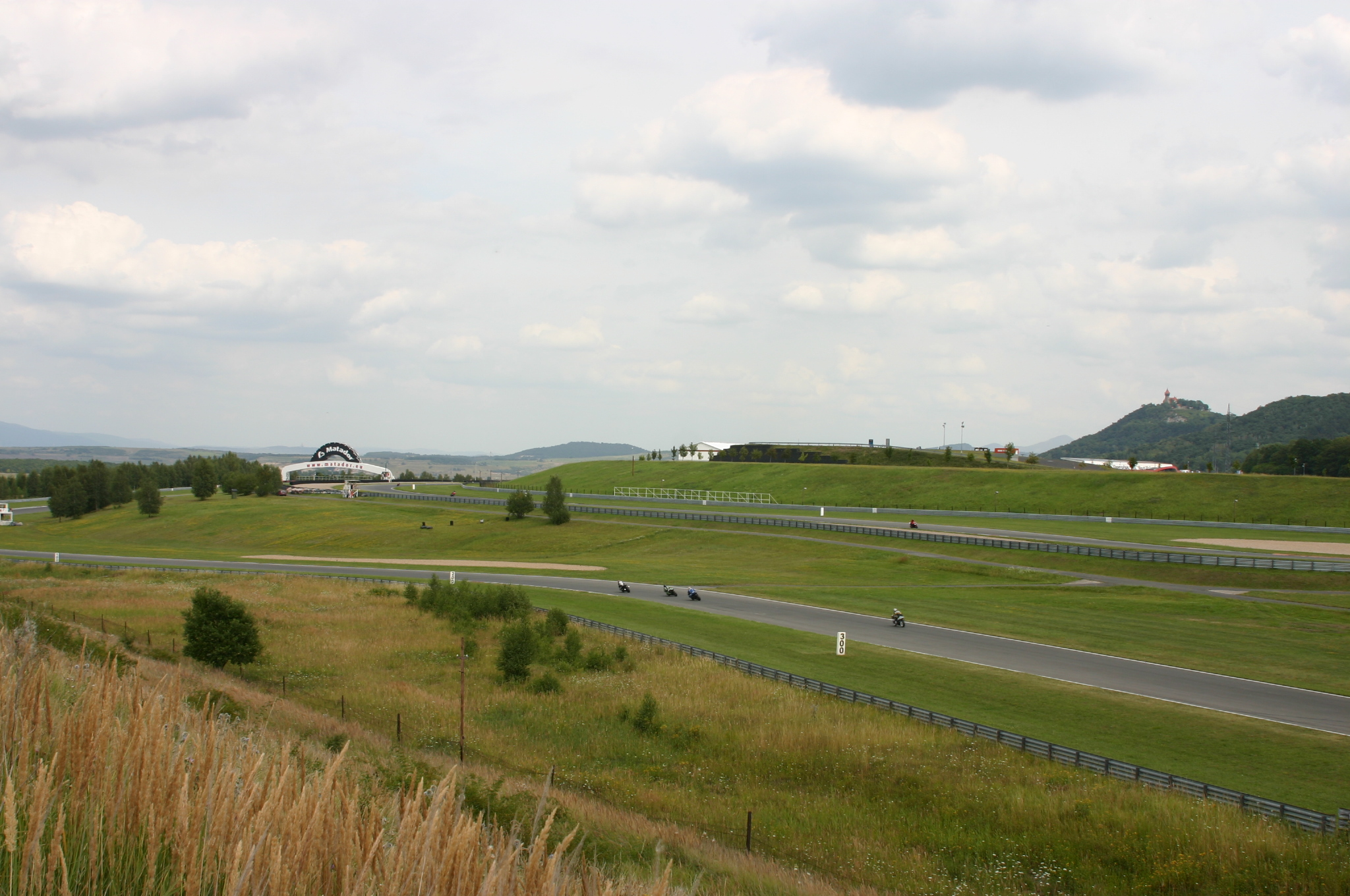
View of the circuit

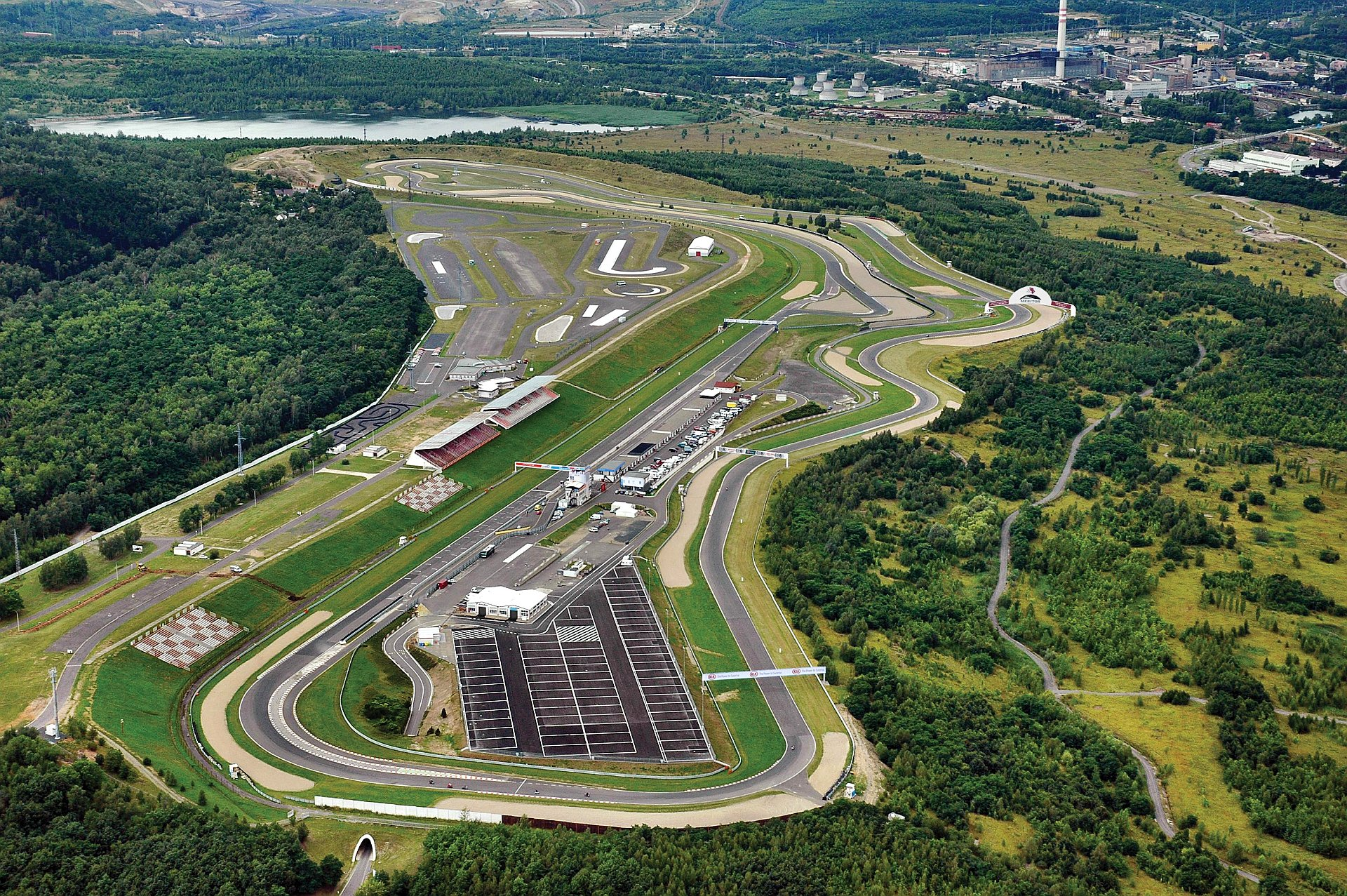
View from the air

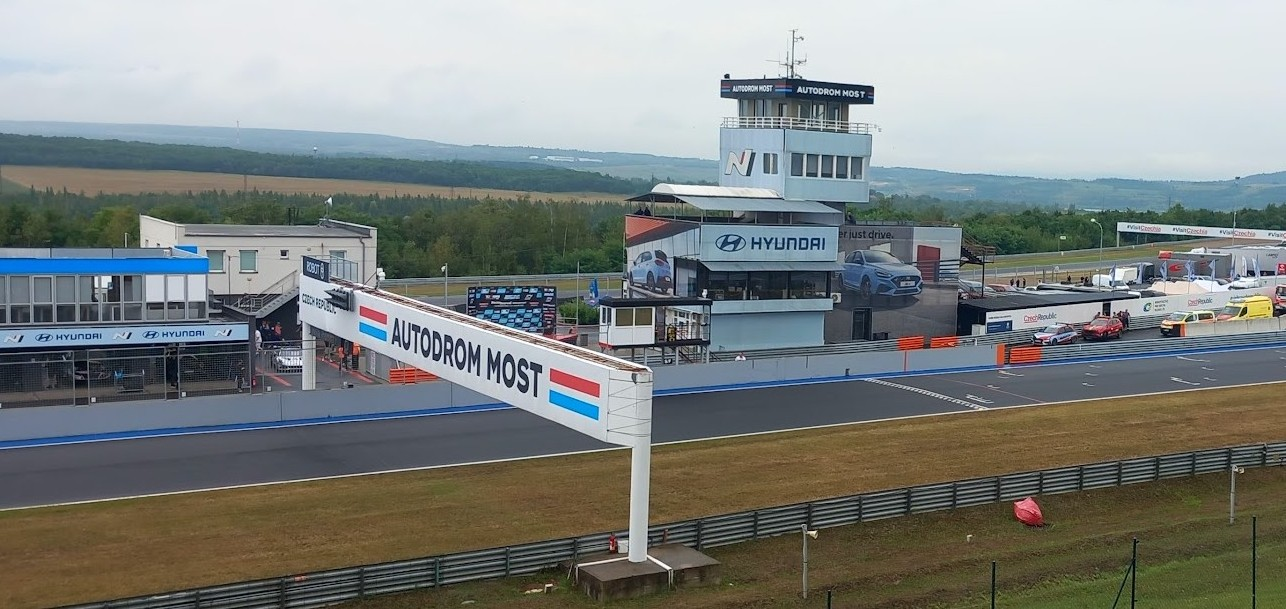
Main building, control tower and start line of Autodrom Most

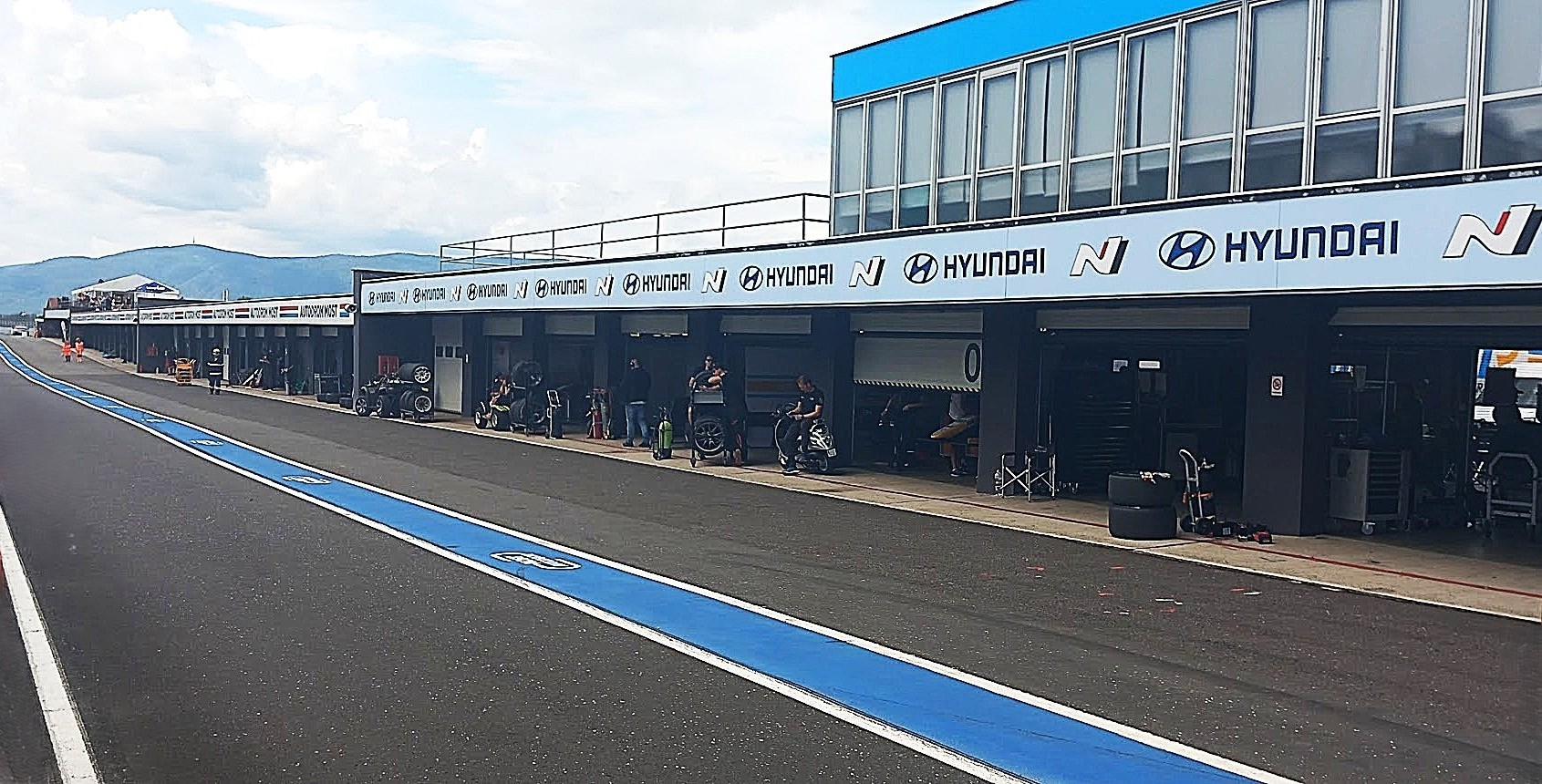
Pitlane and garages at Autodrom Most

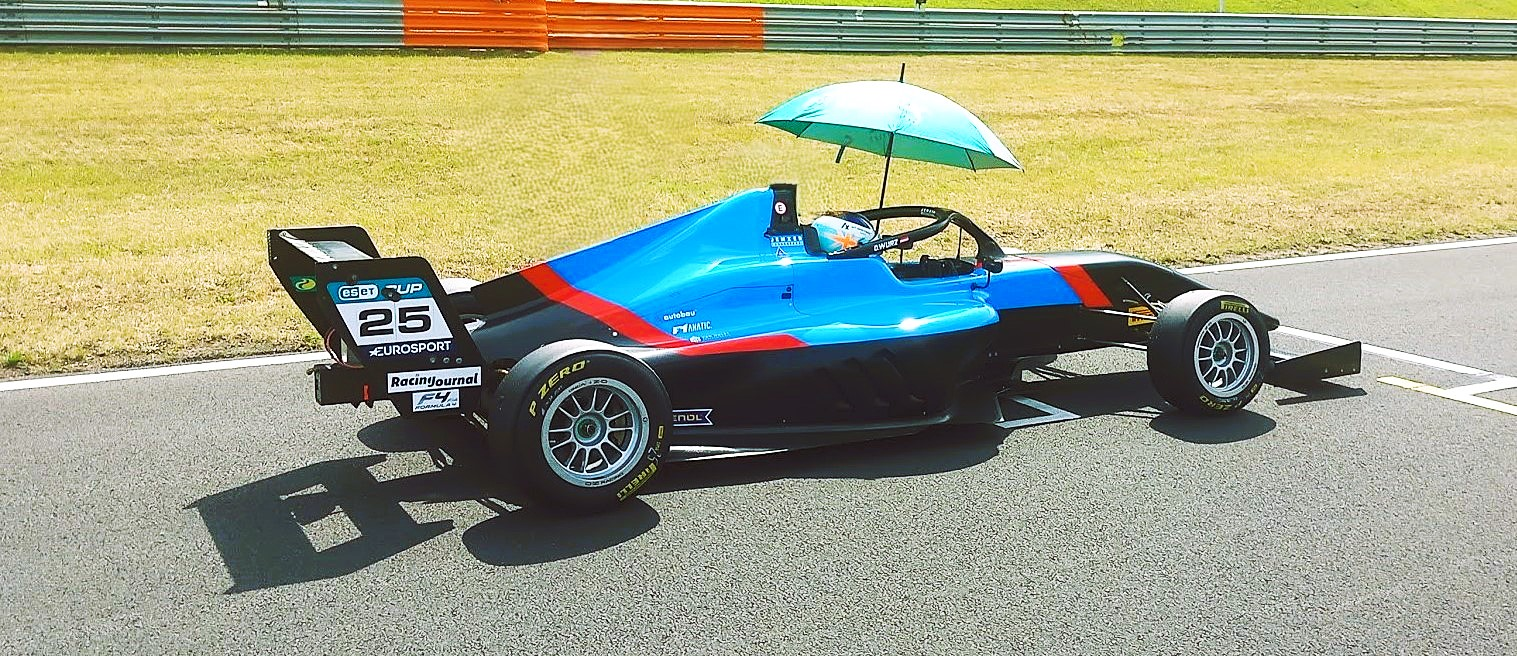
Oscar Wurz, driving for Jenzer Motorsport during the 2024 Formula 4 CEZ Championship season, in which he won the title.
