= 2001 ELMS at Vallelunga =

Layout of the ACI Vallelunga Circuit (1963-2004)

The 2001 ELMS at Vallelunga was the sixth race of the 2001 European Le Mans Series season. It took place at Autodromo di Vallelunga, Italy, on September 2, 2001.

== Official results ==
Class winners in bold.

Pos	Class	No	Team	Drivers	Chassis	Tyre	Laps
Pos	Class	No	Team	Drivers	Engine	Tyre	Laps
1	**LMP900**	**9**	**(United Kingdom) Lanesra**	**(United Kingdom) Richard Dean (South Africa) Gary Formato**	**Panoz LMP-1 Roadster-S**	**A**	**137**
1	**LMP900**	**9**	**(United Kingdom) Lanesra**	**(United Kingdom) Richard Dean (South Africa) Gary Formato**	**Élan 6L8 6.0L V8**	**A**	**137**
2	**GTS**	**41**	**(United Kingdom) Ray Mallock Ltd. (RML)**	**(United Kingdom) Ian McKellar Jr. (United Kingdom) Chris Goodwin**	**Saleen S7-R**	**D**	**134**
2	**GTS**	**41**	**(United Kingdom) Ray Mallock Ltd. (RML)**	**(United Kingdom) Ian McKellar Jr. (United Kingdom) Chris Goodwin**	**Ford 7.0L V8**	**D**	**134**
3	**GT**	**66**	**(United Kingdom) Harlow Motorsport**	**(United Kingdom) Terry Rymer (Sweden) Magnus Wallinder**	**Porsche 911 GT3-R**	**D**	**127**
3	**GT**	**66**	**(United Kingdom) Harlow Motorsport**	**(United Kingdom) Terry Rymer (Sweden) Magnus Wallinder**	**Porsche 3.6L Flat-6**	**D**	**127**
4	GT	77	(Germany) Freisinger Motorsport	(France) Romain Dumas (France) Cyril Chateau	Porsche 911 GT3-RS	**Y**	126
4	GT	77	(Germany) Freisinger Motorsport	(France) Romain Dumas (France) Cyril Chateau	Porsche 3.6L Flat-6	**Y**	126
5	GT	65	(Spain) Paco Orti Racing	(Spain) Paco Orti (Germany) Wolfgang Kaufmann	Porsche 911 GT3-R	**D**	125
5	GT	65	(Spain) Paco Orti Racing	(Spain) Paco Orti (Germany) Wolfgang Kaufmann	Porsche 3.6L Flat-6	**D**	125
6	GT	67	(United Kingdom) Harlow Motorsport	(United Kingdom) Gavin Pickering (United Kingdom) Adam Simmons	Porsche 911 GT3-R	**D**	125
6	GT	67	(United Kingdom) Harlow Motorsport	(United Kingdom) Gavin Pickering (United Kingdom) Adam Simmons	Porsche 3.6L Flat-6	**D**	125
7	GT	62	(United Kingdom) Cirtek Motorsport	(France) Xavier Pompidou (United Kingdom) Tony Littlejohn	Porsche 911 GT3-R	?	123
7	GT	62	(United Kingdom) Cirtek Motorsport	(France) Xavier Pompidou (United Kingdom) Tony Littlejohn	Porsche 3.6L Flat-6	?	123
8	GTS	46	(United Kingdom) Cirtek Motorsport	(Australia) Charlie Cox (United Kingdom) Stephen Stokoe (United Kingdom) Robert Schirle	Porsche 911 GT2	?	123
8	GTS	46	(United Kingdom) Cirtek Motorsport	(Australia) Charlie Cox (United Kingdom) Stephen Stokoe (United Kingdom) Robert Schirle	Porsche 3.8L Turbo Flat-6	?	123
9	GT	61	(United Kingdom) P.K. Sport	(United Kingdom) Piers Masarati (Italy) Maurizio Possumato	Porsche 911 GT3-R	**D**	123
9	GT	61	(United Kingdom) P.K. Sport	(United Kingdom) Piers Masarati (Italy) Maurizio Possumato	Porsche 3.6L Flat-6	**D**	123
10	GTS	26	(Germany) Konrad Team Saleen	(Austria) Franz Konrad (Switzerland) Walter Brun	Saleen S7-R	**G**	117
10	GTS	26	(Germany) Konrad Team Saleen	(Austria) Franz Konrad (Switzerland) Walter Brun	Ford 7.0L V8	**G**	117
11	GT	64	(United Kingdom) Sebah Automotive, Ltd.	(United States) Stephen Earle (United Kingdom) Bart Hayden	Porsche 911 GT3-R	**A**	105
11	GT	64	(United Kingdom) Sebah Automotive, Ltd.	(United States) Stephen Earle (United Kingdom) Bart Hayden	Porsche 3.6L Flat-6	**A**	105
12	**LMP675**	**28**	**(France) Didier Bonnet Racing**	**(France) François Jakubowski (France) Xavier Bich**	**Debora LMP200**	**A**	**98**
12	**LMP675**	**28**	**(France) Didier Bonnet Racing**	**(France) François Jakubowski (France) Xavier Bich**	**BMW 3.2L I6**	**A**	**98**
13	GT	60	(United Kingdom) P.K. Sport	(United Kingdom) Robin Liddell (United Kingdom) Mike Youles	Porsche 911 GT3-RS	**D**	66
13	GT	60	(United Kingdom) P.K. Sport	(United Kingdom) Robin Liddell (United Kingdom) Mike Youles	Porsche 3.6L Flat-6	**D**	66
14 DNF	GT	68	(United Kingdom) Atomic Kitten Racing	(United Kingdom) Roger Waters (United Kingdom) Tom Bellamy	Chevrolet Corvette LM-GT	**D**	40
14 DNF	GT	68	(United Kingdom) Atomic Kitten Racing	(United Kingdom) Roger Waters (United Kingdom) Tom Bellamy	Chevrolet 5.7L V8	**D**	40

== Statistics ==
- Pole Position - #9 Lanesra - 1:06.987
- Fastest Lap - #9 Lanesra - 1:08.207
- Distance - 441.414 km
- Average Speed - 160.385 km/h

European Le Mans Series
Previous race: 2001 ELMS at Most	2001 season	Next race: 2001 Petit Le Mans
