= 2001 European Le Mans Series =

Only season for the IMSA European Le Mans Series

The 2001 European Le Mans Series season was the only season for the IMSA European Le Mans Series. It is a series for Le Mans Prototypes (LMP) and Grand Touring (GT) race cars divided into 4 classes: LMP900, LMP675, GTS, and GT. It began 17 March 2001 and ended 6 October 2001 after 7 races.

The series came about following the expansion of Don Panoz's American Le Mans Series to include European rounds in 2000. The ELMS become a separate series for 2001, although following the same IMSA and ACO rules that the ALMS followed, and even having shared events among the two series. Like the Petit Le Mans for the ALMS, the 1000 km of Estoril was meant to be a unique event that would earn automatic entries to the 24 Hours of Le Mans for its winners. A lack of interest from the European racing community and competition from the FIA's series, meant that this would be the only season of ELMS. Another planned series, known as Asian-Pacific Le Mans Series (APLMS) was planned to begin in late 2001, but never occurred.

Following the demise of the European Le Mans Series, the ACO would attempt to create another European-based sportscar series in 2003 with the more successful Le Mans Endurance Series. The Le Mans Endurance Series was eventually renamed the European Le Mans Series in 2012.

== History ==
With the Automobile Club de l'Ouest (ACO) allowing Don Panoz to bring the rules and racing formulas of the 24 Hours of Le Mans to America with the creation of the Petit Le Mans in 1998, Don Panoz attempted to build up a series to be based around Petit Le Mans. The aged IMSA sportscar series was taken over and became the new American Le Mans Series, and met with much success in 1999. Following this success, Panoz attempting to bring sportscar racing back to Europe, which had lacked a major sportscar series since the demise of the World Sportscar Championship in 1992. This led to the 2000 American Le Mans Series season, which included two races in Europe as the Nürburgring and Silverstone Circuit, as well as a round in Australia. These races would serve as a precursor to what would become the separate European Le Mans Series in 2001.

The European Le Mans Series was launched for 2001 with 5 races, including a premier 1000 km race at Estoril, which would be the European equivalent of the 1000 mile Petit Le Mans and earn automatic entries to the 24 Hours of Le Mans for each class winner.

To aid in the development of the ELMS, the 2001 season shared some races between both ALMS and ELMS. The 12 Hours of Sebring and Petit Le Mans, normally ALMS races, were considered optional races for ELMS teams. At the same time, the ELMS races at Donington Park and Jarama were considered optional for ALMS teams. This allowed for the possibility of boosting the draw from international teams to either series.

Unfortunately the series was unable to earn much attention from European sportscar teams, especially since the final FIA Sportscar Championship and FIA GT Championship series used similar cars, but different rules which would require teams to modify their cars or buy new cars to comply with ELMS rules. This means that the car count for the 2001 season was small. For the ELMS events that included ALMS teams, very few teams actually bothered to make the trip across the Atlantic to participate in races that appeared to have very few serious competitors. Of the ALMS teams that did race, nearly all were factory backed squads that had the money to spend on transporting their equipment to Europe. Thus the entry lists for each race fell from 25 at the beginning of the season to a mere 14 at season's end, with some classes only having one or two competitors.

With a lack of involvement from teams, and less interest from the media due to the lack of teams, the European Le Mans Series was forced to fold following the 2001 season.

The demise of the European Le Mans Series would not be the end of sportscar racing in Europe. In 2003, the Automobile Club de l'Ouest announced their intentions to create their own European-based series, named the Le Mans Endurance Series, which would be similar to the European Le Mans Series, but feature only 1000 km races instead of the shorter, 2 Hour 45 Minute races used by ELMS. This series would be far more successful, with a large number of participants from the very beginning.

=== APLMS ===
At the same time in the development of the European Le Mans Series, Don Panoz also proposed the idea of yet another series. Originally named the Asian Le Mans Series, it was later known as the Asian-Pacific Le Mans Series (APLMS). Like the European Le Mans Series, this APLMS would bring an ACO-backed sportscar series to Asia and the Pacific. This could be seen as a resurrection of the All Japan Sports Prototype Championship (JSPC) which had ended in 1992. The ACO had previous backed a single Japanese event, the 1999 Le Mans Fuji 1000km which combined Le Mans cars with JGTC machines for automatic entries to the 2000 24 Hours of Le Mans. This idea was followed by the American Le Mans Series with the 2000 Race of a Thousand Years race at the Adelaide Street Circuit in Australia. These two events served as a precursor to the planned APLMS series, and at the time of the creation of ELMS, Don Panoz announced his intention to hold an exhibition APLMS race at Sepang International Circuit in Malaysia in late 2001.

As the ELMS season went on, it became apparent that there was a lack of interest in the series, and Don Panoz decided that the APLMS would likely have even less interest. Thus the APLMS exhibition race and all plans for a series were scrapped.

== Schedule ==
Besides Sebring, Estoril, and Petit Le Mans, all events were 2 hours and 45 minutes in length.

Rnd	Race	Circuit	Date
1	(United States) Exxon Superflo 12 Hours of Sebring^{†}	Sebring International Raceway	17 March
2	(United Kingdom) ELMS Race at Donington Park^{†}	Donington Park	14 April
3	(Spain) ELMS Race at Jarama^{†}	Circuito Permanente Del Jarama	20 May
4	(Portugal) 1000 km of Estoril	Autódromo do Estoril	15 July
5	(Czech Republic) ELMS Race at Most	Autodrom Most	5 August
6	(Italy) ELMS Race at Vallelunga	Autodromo di Vallelunga	2 September
7	(United States) Audi presents Petit Le Mans^{†}	Road Atlanta	6 October

† - Joint event with ALMS.

The Salzburgring had planned to host a race on the 5th of August but was cancelled.

== Season results ==
Overall winner in bold.

Rnd	Circuit	LMP900 Winning Team	LMP675 Winning Team	GTS Winning Team	GT Winning Team	Results
Rnd	Circuit	LMP900 Winning Drivers	LMP675 Winning Drivers	GTS Winning Drivers	GT Winning Drivers	Results
1	Sebring	**(Germany) #1 Audi Sport North America**	None	(Germany) #26 Konrad Team Saleen	(United States) #23 Alex Job Racing	Results
1	Sebring	**(Italy) Michele Alboreto** **(Italy) Rinaldo Capello** **(France) Laurent Aïello**		(United Kingdom) Oliver Gavin (United States) Terry Borcheller (Austria) Franz Konrad	(Germany) Sascha Maassen (Germany) Lucas Luhr (France) Emmanuel Collard	Results
2	Donington	**(Germany) #1 Audi Sport Team Joest**	(United Kingdom) #21 Rowan Racing	(United Kingdom) #41 RML	(United States) #23 Alex Job Racing	Results
2	Donington	**(Denmark) Tom Kristensen** **(Italy) Rinaldo Capello**	(United Kingdom) Martin O'Connell (United Kingdom) Warren Carway	(Belgium) Bruno Lambert (United Kingdom) Ian McKellar Jr.	(Germany) Lucas Luhr (Germany) Sascha Maassen	Results
3	Jarama	**(Germany) #1 Audi Sport Team Joest**	(United States) #5 Dick Barbour Racing	(Germany) #26 Konrad Team Saleen	(Germany) #43 Team Schnitzer	Results
3	Jarama	**(Denmark) Tom Kristensen** **(Italy) Rinaldo Capello**	(Belgium) Eric van de Poele (Belgium) Didier de Radigues	(Switzerland) Toni Seiler (Switzerland) Walter Brun (Austria) Franz Konrad	(Germany) Dirk Müller (Sweden) Fredrik Ekblom	Results
4	Estoril	**(France) #72 Pescarolo Sport**	None	(United Kingdom) #41 RML	(Germany) #77 Freisinger Motorsport	Results
4	Estoril	**(France) Jean-Christophe Boullion** **(France) Laurent Redon** **(France) Boris Derichebourg**		(Belgium) Bruno Lambert (United Kingdom) Ian McKellar Jr. (United Kingdom) Chris Goodwin	(France) Xavier Pompidou (France) Romain Dumas	Results
5	Most	**(United Kingdom) #7 Johansson Motorsport**	(France) #38 ROC	(United Kingdom) #41 RML	(United Kingdom) #60 P.K. Sport	Results
5	Most	**(Sweden) Stefan Johansson** **(France) Patrick Lemarié**	(Spain) Jordi Gené (Switzerland) Christophe Pillon	(Belgium) Bruno Lambert (United Kingdom) Ian McKellar Jr.	(United Kingdom) Robin Liddell (United Kingdom) Mike Youles	Results
6	Vallelunga	**(United Kingdom) #9 Lanesra**	(France) #28 Didier Bonnet Racing	(United Kingdom) #41 RML	(United Kingdom) #66 Harlow Motorsport	Results
6	Vallelunga	**(United Kingdom) Richard Dean** **(South Africa) Gary Formato**	(France) François Jakubowski (France) Xavier Bich	(United Kingdom) Ian McKellar Jr. (United Kingdom) Chris Goodwin	(United Kingdom) Terry Rymer (Sweden) Magnus Wallinder	Results
7	Road Atlanta	**(Germany) #2 Audi Sport North America**	(United States) #57 Dick Barbour Racing	(United States) #4 Corvette Racing	(United States) #6 PTG	Results
7	Road Atlanta	**(Germany) Frank Biela** **(Italy) Emanuele Pirro**	(Canada) Scott Maxwell (Canada) John Graham (Venezuela) Milka Duno	(United States) Kelly Collins (United States) Andy Pilgrim (France) Franck Fréon	(Germany) Hans Joachim Stuck (United States) Boris Said (United States) Bill Auberlen	Results

== Teams' Championship ==
Points are awarded to the finishers in the following order:

- 25-21-19-17-15-14-13-12-11-10-...

Exception being for 12 Hours of Sebring, 1000 km of Estoril, and Petit Le Mans which awarded in the following order:

- 30-26-24-22-20-19-18-17-16-15-...

Points were awarded in two separate ways. Only the best finish out of the two American rounds (1 and 7) was included. In addition to this, only the top five finishes for the entire season were included. Points earned but not counting towards the team's total are listed in italics.

Teams only score the points of their highest finishing entry in each race. Teams which participated at Sebring and Petit Le Mans but did not attend any European events are also not counted towards the ELMS championships.

=== LMP900 standings ===
Pos	Team	Chassis	Engine	Rd 1	Rd 2	Rd 3	Rd 4	Rd 5	Rd 6	Rd 7	Total
1	(United Kingdom) Johansson Motorsport	Audi R8	Audi 3.6L Turbo V8	22	19	19	26	25		26	115
2	(Germany) Audi Sport North America	Audi R8	Audi 3.6L Turbo V8	30	25	25				30	80
3	(France) Pescarolo Sport	Courage C60	Peugeot A32 3.2L Turbo V6	18	17		30				65
4	(United States) Panoz Motorsports	Panoz LMP07; Panoz LMP-1 Roadster-S	Élan (Zytek) 4.0L V8; Élan 6L8 6.0L V8	17	14	17				19	50
5	(United Kingdom) Lanesra Racing	Panoz LMP-1 Roadster-S	Élan 6L8 6.0L V8					21	25		46
6	(United Kingdom) Westward Racing	Panoz LMP-1 Roadster-S	Élan 6L8 6.0L V8		15						15
7	(France) Team PlayStation (Oreca)	Chrysler LMP	Mopar 6.0L V8		12						12
8	(United Kingdom) Team Ascari	Ascari A410	Judd GV4 4.0L V10		11						11

=== LMP675 standings ===
Pos	Team	Chassis	Engine	Rd 1	Rd 2	Rd 3	Rd 4	Rd 5	Rd 6	Rd 7	Total
1=	(France) Didier Bonnet Racing	Debora LMP200	BMW 3.2L I6				30	21	25		76
1=	(United States) Dick Barbour Racing	Reynard 01Q	Judd KV675 3.4L V8		21	25				30	76
3	(United States) Roock-KnightHawk Racing	Lola B2K/40	Nissan (AER) VQL 3.4L V8	30		21				22	51
4	(France) Racing Organisation Course	Reynard 2KQ	Volkswagen 2.0L Turbo I4					25		19	44
5	(United Kingdom) Rowan Racing	Pilbeam MP84	Nissan (AER) VQL 3.0L V6		25						25

=== GTS standings ===
Pos	Team	Chassis	Engine	Rd 1	Rd 2	Rd 3	Rd 4	Rd 5	Rd 6	Rd 7	Total
1	(United Kingdom) Ray Mallock Ltd.	Saleen S7-R	Ford 7.0L V8		25	19	30	25	25		124
2	(Germany) Konrad Team Saleen	Saleen S7-R	Ford 7.0L V8	30	21	25	26		19	26	121
3	(United Kingdom) Brookspeed	Chrysler Viper GTS-R	Chrysler 8.0L V10				24			17	41
4	(Germany) Konrad Motorsport	Porsche 911 GT2; Saleen S7-R	Porsche 3.8L Turbo Flat-6; Ford 7.0L V8			21				19	40
5	(United Kingdom) Cirtek Motorsport	Porsche 911 GT2	Porsche 3.8L Turbo Flat-6						21		21

=== GT standings ===
Pos	Team	Chassis	Engine	Rd 1	Rd 2	Rd 3	Rd 4	Rd 5	Rd 6	Rd 7	Total
1	(United Kingdom) P.K. Sport	Porsche 911 GT3-RS	Porsche 3.6L Flat-6		19	17	26	25	14		101
2	(Spain) Paco Orti Racing	Porsche 911 GT3-R	Porsche 3.6L Flat-6		14	14	20	19	19		86
3	(United Kingdom) Harlow Motorsport	Porsche 911 GT3-R	Porsche 3.6L Flat-6			11	24	15	25		75
4	(United States) Alex Job Racing	Porsche 911 GT3-RS	Porsche 3.6L Flat-6	30	25	19				24	74
5	(United Kingdom) Sebah Automotive, Ltd.	Porsche 911 GT3-R	Porsche 3.6L Flat-6		8	10	13	21	13	16	73
6	(Germany) Seikel Motorsport	Porsche 911 GT3-RS	Porsche 3.6L Flat-6	19	17	13	22			18	71
7	(Germany) Freisinger Motorsport	Porsche 911 GT3-RS	Porsche 3.6L Flat-6	16			30		21		67
8	(Germany) BMW Motorsport	BMW M3 GTR	BMW 4.0L V8	24	10	25				26	61
9	(Canada) Kyser Racing	Porsche 911 GT3-R	Porsche 3.6L Flat-6	18	15					17	33
10	(United Kingdom) Cirtek Motorsport	Porsche 911 GT3-R	Porsche 3.6L Flat-6	15					15		30
11=	(Australia) Skea Racing International	Porsche 911 GT3-R	Porsche 3.6L Flat-6				12	17			29
11=	(France) Noël del Bello Racing	Porsche 911 GT3-R	Porsche 3.6L Flat-6		12		17				29
13	(United Kingdom) Atomic Kitten Motorsport	Chevrolet Corvette LM-GT	Chevrolet LS1 5.7L V8				14		11		25
14	(France) Luc Alphand Aventures	Porsche 911 GT3-R	Porsche 3.6L Flat-6				19				19
15	(Spain) Racing Engineering	Porsche 911 GT3-R	Porsche 3.6L Flat-6				16				16
