= 2022 Northern Talent Cup =

2022 Northern Talent Cup
Previous:	2021	Next:	2023

The 2022 Northern Talent Cup is the third season of the Northern Talent Cup. The season will start on May 13 at the Circuit Bugatti, and will end on September 4 at the Red Bull Ring. The series race using KTM 250 Standard.

== Calendar and results ==
Calendar
Round	Date	Circuit	Pole position	Race winner	Sources
1	May 14	(France) Circuit Bugatti	(Hungary) Rossi Moor	(Hungary) Rossi Moor	
1	May 15	(France) Circuit Bugatti	(Hungary) Rossi Moor	(Hungary) Kevin Farkas	
2	May 21	(Germany) Oschersleben	(Hungary) Rossi Moor	(Switzerland) Lenoxx Phommara	
2	May 22	(Germany) Oschersleben	(Hungary) Rossi Moor	(Hungary) Rossi Moor	
3	June 18	(Germany) Sachsenring	(Netherlands) Jurrien van Crugten	(Hungary) Rossi Moor	
3	June 19	(Germany) Sachsenring	(Netherlands) Jurrien van Crugten	(Hungary) Kevin Farkas	
4	June 25	(Netherlands) TT Circuit Assen	(Netherlands) Jurrien van Crugten	(Hungary) Rossi Moor	
4	June 26	(Netherlands) TT Circuit Assen	(Netherlands) Jurrien van Crugten	(Germany) Dustin Schneider	
5	July 30	(Czech Republic) Autodrom Most	(Switzerland) Maxime Schmid	(Hungary) Rossi Moor	
5	July 31	(Czech Republic) Autodrom Most	(Switzerland) Maxime Schmid	(Hungary) Kevin Farkas	
6	August 13	(Netherlands) TT Circuit Assen			
6	August 14	(Netherlands) TT Circuit Assen			
7	September 3	(Austria) Red Bull Ring			
7	September 4	(Austria) Red Bull Ring			

== Entry list ==
2022 provisional entry list
Team	Bike	No.	Rider
JRP Junior Academy Team	KTM 250 FRR	3	(Germany) Luca Göttlicher
MCA Racing	KTM 250 FRR	7	(Germany) Rocco Caspar Sessler
Busch und Wagner Racing Team	KTM 250 FRR	10	(Germany) Valentino Herrlich
Chrobák Motorsport Egyesület	KTM 250 FRR	12	(Hungary) Martin Vincze
Helena und Julius Racing Team - HJRT	KTM 250 FRR	15	(Germany) Julius Coenen
Brno Circuit JRT	KTM 250 FRR	16	(Czech Republic) Michael Prokeš
Junior Black Nights	KTM 250 FRR	18	(Belgium) Noa Cuypers
TeamNL Open Line	KTM 250 FRR	19	(Netherlands) Rio Olofsen
Goblin Racing	KTM 250 FRR	20	(Germany) Dustin Schneider
BRR Team	KTM 250 FRR	21	(Hungary) Lorinc Laszlo
SP-Moto Junior Team Ukraine	KTM 250 FRR	22	(Ukraine) Sviatoslav Pylypenko
Agria Racing Team	KTM 250 FRR	28	(Hungary) Kevin Farkas
Brno Circuit JRT	KTM 250 FRR	29	(Czech Republic) Filip Novotný
KNMV/DG Motorsport by MIJN VERANDA.NU	KTM 250 FRR	31	(Netherlands) Delano Greven
SP-Moto Junior Team Ukraine	KTM 250 FRR	33	(Ukraine) David Sidorov
BB64 Academy	KTM 250 FRR	36	(Netherlands) Jurrien van Crugten
Junior Black Nights	KTM 250 FRR	41	(Belgium) Loris Dekkers
Frellsen RR	KTM 250 FRR	42	(Denmark) Julius Ahrenkiel-Frellsen
Forty Racing	KTM 250 FRR	44	(Hungary) Tibor Varga
FAIRIUM Next Generation Riders Team	KTM 250 FRR	46	(Italy) Matteo Masili
Team Phommara	KTM 250 FRR	48	(Switzerland) Lenoxx Phommara
Team Phommara	KTM 250 FRR	53	(Switzerland) Levin Phommara
HK Racing	KTM 250 FRR	57	(Austria) Kilian Holzer
TeamNL Open Line	KTM 250 FRR	5; 77	(Netherlands) Tom Kuil (Netherlands) Loris Veneman
FAIRIUM Next Generation Riders Team	KTM 250 FRR	92	(Hungary) Rossi Moor
Team Schmid	KTM 250 FRR	95	(Switzerland) Maxime Schmid
Source: NorthernTalentCup.com

== Riders' Championship standings ==
Points were awarded to the top fifteen riders, provided the rider finished the race.

Position	1st	2nd	3rd	4th	5th	6th	7th	8th	9th	10th	11th	12th	13th	14th	15th
Points	25	20	16	13	11	10	9	8	7	6	5	4	3	2	1

Pos.	Rider	BUG (France)		OSC (Germany)		SAC (Germany)		ASS1 (Netherlands)		MOS (Czech Republic)		ASS2 (Netherlands)		RBR (Austria)		Pts
1	(Hungary) Rossi Moor	1^{P}	3^{P}	3^{P}	1^{P}	1	2	1		1	2	4	2			230
2	(Hungary) Kevin Farkas	4	1	DNS	5	2	1	2	9	2	1	1	1			216
3	(Germany) Dustin Schneider	9	5	4	3	3	6	7	1		5	7	5	3	8	166
4	(Netherlands) Loris Veneman	2	1	5												164
5	(Netherlands) Jurrien van Crugten					^{P}	^{P}	^{P}	^{P}	^{P}						148
6	(Hungary) Tibor Varga															136
7	(Hungary) Martin Vincze															133
8	(Switzerland) Lennox Phommara															117
9	(Germany) Valentino Herrlich															92
10	(Austria) Kilian Holzer															187
11	(Italy) Matteo Masili															83
12	(Germany) Roco Sessler															75
13	(Germany) Julius Coenen															69
14	(Belgium) Noa Cuypers															64
15	(Switzerland) Maxime Schmid															60
16	(Germany) Luca Göttlicher															35
17	(Czech Republic) Filip Novotný															29
18	(Ukraine) David Sidorov															14
19	(Netherlands) Tom Kuil															10
20	(Netherlands) Rio Olofsen															9
21	(Denmark) Julius Ahrenkiel-Frellsen															6
22	(Hungary) Laszlo Lorinc															4
23	(Czech Republic) Michael Prokeš															4
24	(Netherlands) Delano Greven															3
25	(Belgium) Loris Dekkers															3
26	(Switzerland) Levin Phommara															3
	(Ukraine) Sviatoslav Pylpenko															0
