= 2001 ELMS at Most =

Layout of the Autodrom Most (1983-2004)

The 2001 ELMS at Most was the fifth round of the 2001 European Le Mans Series season. It took place at Autodrom Most, Czech Republic, on August 5, 2001.

== Official results ==
Class winners in bold.

Pos	Class	No	Team	Drivers	Chassis	Tyre	Laps
Pos	Class	No	Team	Drivers	Engine	Tyre	Laps
1	**LMP900**	**7**	**(United Kingdom) Johansson Motorsport (United Kingdom) Arena Motorsport**	**(Sweden) Stefan Johansson (France) Patrick Lemarié**	**Audi R8**	MI	**117**
1	**LMP900**	**7**	**(United Kingdom) Johansson Motorsport (United Kingdom) Arena Motorsport**	**(Sweden) Stefan Johansson (France) Patrick Lemarié**	**Audi 3.6L Turbo V8**	MI	**117**
2	**LMP675**	**38**	**(France) Racing Organisation Course**	**(Spain) Jordi Gené (Switzerland) Christophe Pillon**	**Reynard 2KQ**	MI	**113**
2	**LMP675**	**38**	**(France) Racing Organisation Course**	**(Spain) Jordi Gené (Switzerland) Christophe Pillon**	**Volkswagen 2.0L Turbo I4**	MI	**113**
3	LMP900	9	(United Kingdom) Lanesra	(Czech Republic) Tomáš Enge (Czech Republic) Jaroslav Janiš	Panoz LMP-1 Roadster-S	A	111
3	LMP900	9	(United Kingdom) Lanesra	(Czech Republic) Tomáš Enge (Czech Republic) Jaroslav Janiš	Élan 6L8 6.0L V8	A	111
4	**GTS**	**41**	**(United Kingdom) Ray Mallock Ltd. (RML)**	**(Belgium) Bruno Lambert (United Kingdom) Ian McKellar Jr.**	**Saleen S7-R**	D	**106**
4	**GTS**	**41**	**(United Kingdom) Ray Mallock Ltd. (RML)**	**(Belgium) Bruno Lambert (United Kingdom) Ian McKellar Jr.**	**Ford 7.0L V8**	D	**106**
5	**GT**	**60**	**(United Kingdom) P.K. Sport**	**(United Kingdom) Mike Youles (United Kingdom) Robin Liddell**	**Porsche 911 GT3-RS**	D	**102**
5	**GT**	**60**	**(United Kingdom) P.K. Sport**	**(United Kingdom) Mike Youles (United Kingdom) Robin Liddell**	**Porsche 3.6L Flat-6**	D	**102**
6	GT	64	(United Kingdom) Sebah Automotive	(United Kingdom) Bart Hayden (United States) Stephen Earle	Porsche 911 GT3-R	A	101
6	GT	64	(United Kingdom) Sebah Automotive	(United Kingdom) Bart Hayden (United States) Stephen Earle	Porsche 3.6L Flat-6	A	101
7	GT	65	(Spain) Paco Orti Racing	(Spain) Paco Orti (Germany) Wolfgang Kaufmann	Porsche 911 GT3-R	D	100
7	GT	65	(Spain) Paco Orti Racing	(Spain) Paco Orti (Germany) Wolfgang Kaufmann	Porsche 3.6L Flat-6	D	100
8	GT	73	(Australia) Skea Racing International	(United Kingdom) Richard Dean (Italy) Giovanni Anapoli	Porsche 911 GT3-R	D	99
8	GT	73	(Australia) Skea Racing International	(United Kingdom) Richard Dean (Italy) Giovanni Anapoli	Porsche 3.6L Flat-6	D	99
9	GTS	26	(Germany) Konrad Motorsport	(United States) Charles Slater (Poland) Maciej Stanco	Porsche 911 GT2	D	70
9	GTS	26	(Germany) Konrad Motorsport	(United States) Charles Slater (Poland) Maciej Stanco	Porsche 3.8L Turbo Flat-6	D	70
10 DSQ^{†}	GT	61	(United Kingdom) P.K. Sport	(United Kingdom) Robert Babikan (United Kingdom) Piers Masarati (Czech Republic) Milan Maderyč	Porsche 911 GT3-R	D	99
10 DSQ^{†}	GT	61	(United Kingdom) P.K. Sport	(United Kingdom) Robert Babikan (United Kingdom) Piers Masarati (Czech Republic) Milan Maderyč	Porsche 3.6L Flat-6	D	99
10 DNF	GT	67	(United Kingdom) Harlow Motorsport	(United Kingdom) Gavin Pickering (United Kingdom) Adam Simmons	Porsche 911 GT3-R	D	89
10 DNF	GT	67	(United Kingdom) Harlow Motorsport	(United Kingdom) Gavin Pickering (United Kingdom) Adam Simmons	Porsche 3.6L Flat-6	D	89
11 DNF	GT	74	(Australia) Skea Racing International	(Portugal) Bernardo Sá Nogueira (United Kingdom) Nigel Rata (Austria) Thomas Jacocitsch	Porsche 911 GT3-R	D	87
11 DNF	GT	74	(Australia) Skea Racing International	(Portugal) Bernardo Sá Nogueira (United Kingdom) Nigel Rata (Austria) Thomas Jacocitsch	Porsche 3.6L Flat-6	D	87
12 DNF	GT	66	(United Kingdom) Harlow Motorsport	(United Kingdom) Geoff Lister (United Kingdom) Terry Rymer	Porsche 911 GT3-R	D	76
12 DNF	GT	66	(United Kingdom) Harlow Motorsport	(United Kingdom) Geoff Lister (United Kingdom) Terry Rymer	Porsche 3.6L Flat-6	D	76
13 DNF	LMP675	28	(France) Didier Bonnet Racing	(France) Guillaume Gomez (France) David Dussau	Debora LMP200	A	48
13 DNF	LMP675	28	(France) Didier Bonnet Racing	(France) Guillaume Gomez (France) David Dussau	BMW 3.2L I6	A	48

† - Car #61 was disqualified for aggressive driving and avoidable contact with another car.

== Statistics ==
- Pole Position - #7 Johansson Motorsport - 1:18.110
- Fastest Lap - #7 Johansson Motorsport - 1:21.025
- Distance - 485.316 km
- Average Speed - 175.538 km/h

European Le Mans Series
Previous race: 2001 1000km of Estoril	2001 season	Next race: 2001 ELMS at Vallelunga
