= 2001 1000km of Estoril =

Layout of the Autódromo do Estoril

The 2001 1000km of Estoril was the fourth race of the 2001 European Le Mans Series season. It took place at Autódromo do Estoril, Portugal, on July 15, 2001.

Although it was planned for 1000 km, the race had to be stopped when it ran over its 6-hour maximum limit. The overall winner in LMP, as well as the class winners in GTS and GT, each won automatic entry to the 2002 24 Hours of Le Mans. The winning team was initially disqualified after the podium ceremony for an incident with Tom Coronel's Audi during the race, but later reinstated.

== Official results ==
Class winners in bold.

| Pos | Class | No | Team | Drivers | Chassis | Tyre | Laps |
| Pos | Class | No | Team | Drivers | Engine | Tyre | Laps |
|---|---|---|---|---|---|---|---|
| 1 | **LMP900** | **72** | **(France) Pescarolo Sport** | **(France) Jean-Christophe Boullion (France) Laurent Redon (France) Boris Derichebourg** | **Courage C60** | MI | **209** |
| 1 | **LMP900** | **72** | **(France) Pescarolo Sport** | **(France) Jean-Christophe Boullion (France) Laurent Redon (France) Boris Derichebourg** | **Peugeot 3.2L Turbo V6** | MI | **209** |
| 2 | **GTS** | **41** | **(United Kingdom) Ray Mallock Ltd. (RML)** | **(Belgium) Bruno Lambert (United Kingdom) Ian McKellar Jr. (United Kingdom) Chris Goodwin** | **Saleen S7-R** | D | **197** |
| 2 | **GTS** | **41** | **(United Kingdom) Ray Mallock Ltd. (RML)** | **(Belgium) Bruno Lambert (United Kingdom) Ian McKellar Jr. (United Kingdom) Chris Goodwin** | **Ford 7.0L V8** | D | **197** |
| 3 | GTS | 26 | (Germany) Konrad Team Saleen | (United States) Charles Slater (Switzerland) Walter Brun (Austria) Franz Konrad | Saleen S7-R | G | 193 |
| 3 | GTS | 26 | (Germany) Konrad Team Saleen | (United States) Charles Slater (Switzerland) Walter Brun (Austria) Franz Konrad | Ford 7.0L V8 | G | 193 |
| 4 DNF | LMP900 | 7 | (United Kingdom) Johansson Motorsport (United Kingdom) Arena Motorsport | (Sweden) Stefan Johansson (Netherlands) Tom Coronel (France) Patrick Lemarié | Audi R8 | MI | 192 |
| 4 DNF | LMP900 | 7 | (United Kingdom) Johansson Motorsport (United Kingdom) Arena Motorsport | (Sweden) Stefan Johansson (Netherlands) Tom Coronel (France) Patrick Lemarié | Audi 3.6L Turbo V8 | MI | 192 |
| 5 | **GT** | **77** | **(Germany) Freisinger Motorsport** | **(France) Xavier Pompidou (France) Romain Dumas** | **Porsche 911 GT3-RS** | Y | **191** |
| 5 | **GT** | **77** | **(Germany) Freisinger Motorsport** | **(France) Xavier Pompidou (France) Romain Dumas** | **Porsche 3.6L Flat-6** | Y | **191** |
| 6 | GT | 60 | (United Kingdom) P.K. Sport | (United Kingdom) Mike Youles (United Kingdom) Robin Liddell (United Kingdom) Piers Masarati | Porsche 911 GT3-RS | D | 191 |
| 6 | GT | 60 | (United Kingdom) P.K. Sport | (United Kingdom) Mike Youles (United Kingdom) Robin Liddell (United Kingdom) Piers Masarati | Porsche 3.6L Flat-6 | D | 191 |
| 7 | GT | 66 | (United Kingdom) Harlow Motorsport | (United Kingdom) Terry Rymer (United Kingdom) Gavin Pickering (United Kingdom) Adam Simmons | Porsche 911 GT3-R | D | 189 |
| 7 | GT | 66 | (United Kingdom) Harlow Motorsport | (United Kingdom) Terry Rymer (United Kingdom) Gavin Pickering (United Kingdom) Adam Simmons | Porsche 3.6L Flat-6 | D | 189 |
| 8 | GT | 52 | (Germany) Seikel Motorsport | (Sweden) Magnus Wallinder (United Kingdom) Geoff Lister (Portugal) Manuel Mello Breyner | Porsche 911 GT3-RS | Y | 189 |
| 8 | GT | 52 | (Germany) Seikel Motorsport | (Sweden) Magnus Wallinder (United Kingdom) Geoff Lister (Portugal) Manuel Mello Breyner | Porsche 3.6L Flat-6 | Y | 189 |
| 9 | GT | 65 | (Spain) Paco Orti Racing | (Spain) Paco Orti (Spain) Jesús Diez de Villaroel (Portugal) Bernardo Sá Nogueira | Porsche 911 GT3-R | D | 188 |
| 9 | GT | 65 | (Spain) Paco Orti Racing | (Spain) Paco Orti (Spain) Jesús Diez de Villaroel (Portugal) Bernardo Sá Nogueira | Porsche 3.6L Flat-6 | D | 188 |
| 10 | GT | 70 | (France) Luc Alphand Aventures | (France) Luc Alphand (France) Luis Marques | Porsche 911 GT3-R | P | 187 |
| 10 | GT | 70 | (France) Luc Alphand Aventures | (France) Luc Alphand (France) Luis Marques | Porsche 3.6L Flat-6 | P | 187 |
| 11 | GT | 61 | (United Kingdom) P.K. Sport | (United Kingdom) Mark Humphrey (United Kingdom) Fred Moss (United Kingdom) Basil Demeroutis | Porsche 911 GT3-R | D | 184 |
| 11 | GT | 61 | (United Kingdom) P.K. Sport | (United Kingdom) Mark Humphrey (United Kingdom) Fred Moss (United Kingdom) Basil Demeroutis | Porsche 3.6L Flat-6 | D | 184 |
| 12 | GT | 63 | (France) Noël del Bello Racing | (France) Sylvain Noël (France) Patrick Caternet (Belgium) Dirk Schoysman | Porsche 911 GT3-R | D | 181 |
| 12 | GT | 63 | (France) Noël del Bello Racing | (France) Sylvain Noël (France) Patrick Caternet (Belgium) Dirk Schoysman | Porsche 3.6L Flat-6 | D | 181 |
| 13 | GTS | 56 | (United Kingdom) Brookspeed Racing | (Portugal) Pedro Mello Breyner (Portugal) Tiago Monteiro (United Kingdom) Bobby Verdon-Roe | Chrysler Viper GTS-R | D | 181 |
| 13 | GTS | 56 | (United Kingdom) Brookspeed Racing | (Portugal) Pedro Mello Breyner (Portugal) Tiago Monteiro (United Kingdom) Bobby Verdon-Roe | Chrysler 8.0L V10 | D | 181 |
| 14 | GT | 74 | (Australia) Skea Racing International | (United Kingdom) Nigel Rata (United Kingdom) John Sheldon (Austria) Thomas Jacobitsch | Porsche 911 GT3-R | D | 180 |
| 14 | GT | 74 | (Australia) Skea Racing International | (United Kingdom) Nigel Rata (United Kingdom) John Sheldon (Austria) Thomas Jacobitsch | Porsche 3.6L Flat-6 | D | 180 |
| 15 DNF | GT | 71 | (Spain) Racing Engineering | (Spain) Andrés Vilariño (Italy) Luca Riccitelli (Portugal) Ni Amorim | Porsche 911 GT3-R | D | 180 |
| 15 DNF | GT | 71 | (Spain) Racing Engineering | (Spain) Andrés Vilariño (Italy) Luca Riccitelli (Portugal) Ni Amorim | Porsche 3.6L Flat-6 | D | 180 |
| 16 | GT | 68 | (United Kingdom) Atomic Kitten Racing | (United Kingdom) Tom Bellamy (United Kingdom) Roger Walters | Chevrolet Corvette LM-GT | D | 174 |
| 16 | GT | 68 | (United Kingdom) Atomic Kitten Racing | (United Kingdom) Tom Bellamy (United Kingdom) Roger Walters | Chevrolet 5.7L V8 | D | 174 |
| 17 DNF | GT | 64 | (United Kingdom) Sebah Automotive | (United Kingdom) Bart Hayden (United Kingdom) Hugh Hayden (United States) Stephen Earle | Porsche 911 GT3-R | A | 114 |
| 17 DNF | GT | 64 | (United Kingdom) Sebah Automotive | (United Kingdom) Bart Hayden (United Kingdom) Hugh Hayden (United States) Stephen Earle | Porsche 3.6L Flat-6 | A | 114 |
| 18 DNF | GT | 73 | (Australia) Skea Racing International | (United Kingdom) Johnny Mowlem (United Kingdom) Richard Dean | Porsche 911 GT3-R | D | 98 |
| 18 DNF | GT | 73 | (Australia) Skea Racing International | (United Kingdom) Johnny Mowlem (United Kingdom) Richard Dean | Porsche 3.6L Flat-6 | D | 98 |
| 19 DNF | LMP675 | 28 | (France) Didier Bonnet Racing | (France) David Dussau (France) Xavier Bich (France) Guillaume Gomez | Debora LMP200 | A | 57 |
| 19 DNF | LMP675 | 28 | (France) Didier Bonnet Racing | (France) David Dussau (France) Xavier Bich (France) Guillaume Gomez | BMW 3.2L I6 | A | 57 |

== Statistics ==
- Pole Position - #7 Johansson Motorsport - 1:28.876
- Fastest Lap - #7 Johansson Motorsport - 1:31.341
- Distance - 874.038 km
- Average Speed - 145.52 km/h

European Le Mans Series
| Previous race: 2001 ELMS at Jarama | 2001 season | Next race: 2001 ELMS at Most |
