= Saleen S7 =

Sports car manufactured by Saleen

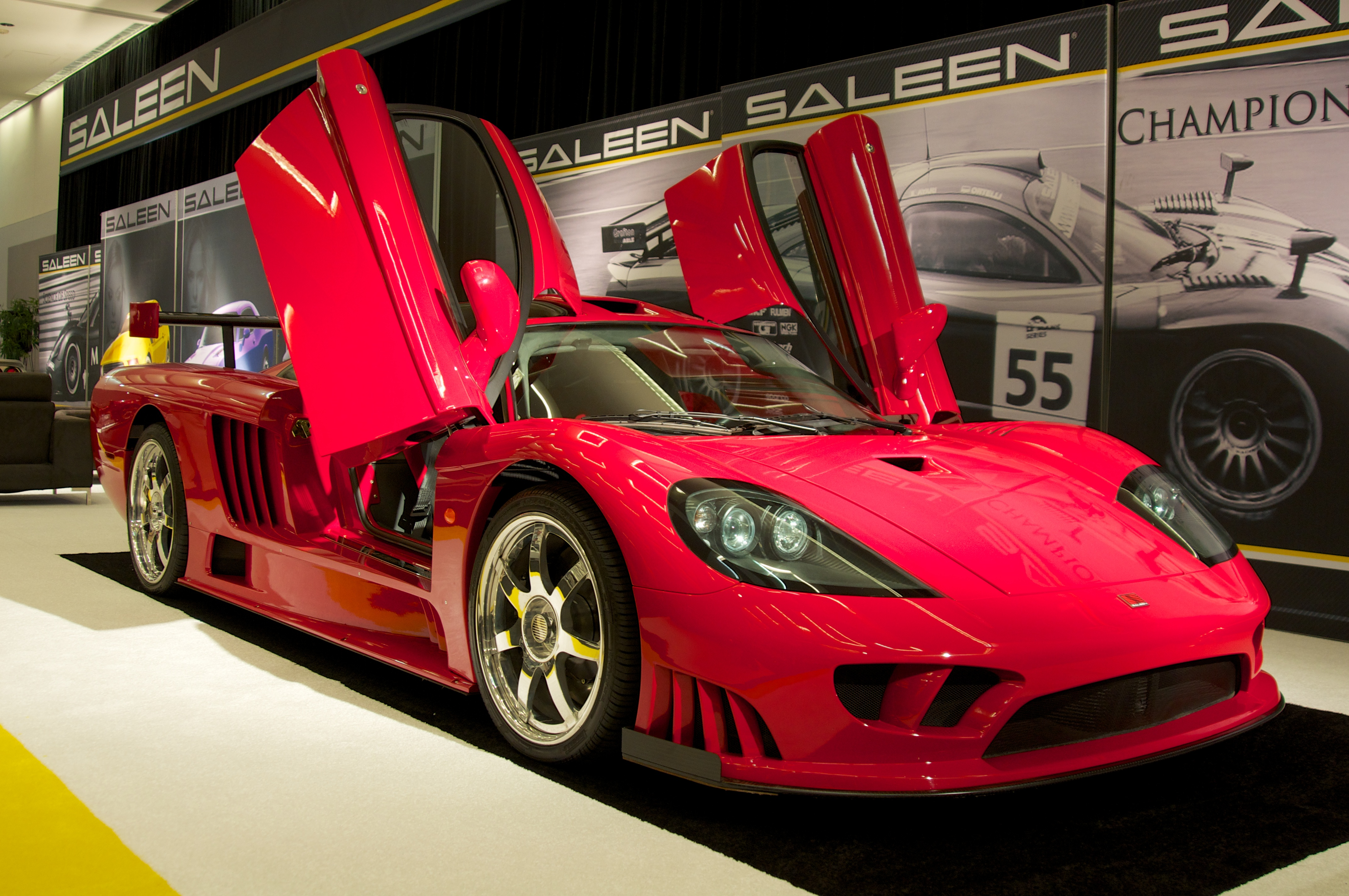

Overview
- Manufacturer: Saleen
- Production: 2000–2009
- Assembly: United States: Irvine, California
- Designer: Steve Saleen; Phil Frank

Body and chassis
- Class: Sports car (S)
- Body style: 2-door coupé
- Layout: Rear mid-engine, rear-wheel drive
- Doors: Butterfly

Powertrain
- Engine: 427 cu in (7.0 L) Ford Windsor V8 (naturally aspirated / twin-turbocharged)
- Power output: 550 hp (558 PS; 410 kW) (S7); 750 hp (760 PS; 559 kW) (S7 Twin Turbo)
- Transmission: 6-speed manual

Dimensions
- Wheelbase: 106.3 in (2,700 mm)
- Length: 188 in (4,775 mm)
- Width: 78 in (1,981 mm)
- Height: 41 in (1,041 mm)
- Curb weight: 2,865 lb (1,300 kg)

The Saleen S7 is an American hand-built, high-performance sports car designed and built by American automobile manufacturer Saleen Automotive, Inc. It was developed jointly by Steve Saleen for the initial concept, direction and engine, Hidden Creek Industries for resources and initial funding, and Phil Frank for aerodynamic, body and interior CAD design and development. The chassis and suspension were built in Irvine, CA.

It was the first fully proprietary car produced by Saleen and became America's sixth mid-engine production sports car coming after the Pontiac Fiero, Consulier GTP, Mosler Raptor, Vector W8, and M12. The S7 debuted on August 19, 2000, at the Monterey Historic Races. The all-aluminium engine is a proprietary unit developed and built in house. It is a bored-and-stroked derivative of Ford's small block, with Cleveland-style canted valve heads which have been extensively reworked and modified. Having a large displacement of 427 cubic inches (7.0 L) the engine is based on and has been developed around the more compact and lighter small-block architecture and is in fact not based on the FE big-block. It proved remarkably tractable and flexible for a high-output requirement—550 hp (410 kW) at 6,400 rpm. In 2005, the S7 gained a more powerful twin-turbocharged powerplant which boosted engine power to 750 hp (559 kW) and estimated top speed of 250 mph (402 km/h).

== Overview ==
=== Exterior ===
The body of the car, made entirely from carbon fiber, incorporates the use of scoops, spoilers, and other aerodynamic features to create Split Channel airflow throughout the car. At 160 mph (257 km/h), the car creates its own weight in downforce.

=== Interior ===
Leather appears throughout the cabin, with aluminum accents. The S7 comes with a set of custom-fit luggage. Because of the car's mid-engine layout, it has two trunks at the front and rear. Other features include an LCD monitor, rear-view camera, quick-release steering wheel and a 240 mph (390 km/h) speedometer. The cabin is of an asymmetrical layout, and comes with fixed seats, with the driver's seat positioned toward the center to improve both the driver's visibility and center the driver's weight in the vehicle.

=== Chassis ===
The chassis uses a space frame design consisting of 4130 lightweight steel and aluminium honeycomb composite reinforcing panels. It is divided into bolt-fastened sub-assemblies to allow for rapid access to critical subsystems. This design contributes to the car's light overall weight of 2,865 lb (1,300 kg).

=== Performance ===
The naturally aspirated version of the S7 is able to accelerate from 0–60 mph (97 km/h) in an estimated 3.3 seconds, and to 100 mph (161 km/h) in an estimated 7.6 seconds. It completes a standing 1/4 mile (402 m) in an estimated 11.36 seconds, reaching 127 mph (204 km/h). Top speed was claimed to be 220 mph (354 km/h), but this has never been confirmed in testing.

=== Electrical systems ===
Standard electronics include: Power windows, power door locks, remote control operated doors, hood, trunk, and engine compartment openers, electronic power steering with redundant safety circuits, 110 volt inlet for maintaining the battery, electronic heated front window, shut off control for electronic fuel pump upon crash impact and a rearview camera system with in-dash flip-up monitor and navigation. The electrical wire harnesses were said to be manufactured with the "highest quality materials." Teflon-coated tinned military specification wire, cannon plugs, gold plated pins and sockets were used for the connectors, and wire harnesses were wrapped with a high-temperature glass mesh under a woven Kevlar outer skin.

== S7 Twin Turbo ==
=== Engine ===
The engine is upgraded with Garrett twin-turbochargers producing 5.5 psi (0.38 bar) of boost, increasing the maximum power output to 750 hp (559 kW; 760 PS) at 6,300 rpm and the maximum torque to 700 lb⋅ft (949 N⋅m) at 4,800 rpm. The front and rear diffusers and the rear spoiler were also reworked to increase downforce by 60%.

Gear	1	2	3	4	5	6	Final Drive
Ratio	2.86:1	1.61:1	1.14:1	0.96:1	0.81:1	0.64:1	3.70:1

=== Performance ===
Manufacturer estimates:

- 0–60 mph (97 km/h): 2.7 sec
- 0–100 mph (161 km/h): 5.9 sec
- 0–200 mph (322 km/h): 27 sec
- 1/4 mile (402 m): 10.5 sec
- Top speed: 248 mph (399 km/h)

=== Competition package ===
In 2006, Saleen offered an optional competition package for the S7 Twin Turbo. The package offers a 33% increase in power, to a total of approximately 1,000 hp (1,014 PS; 746 kW), as well as changes to the suspension, a revised front and rear diffuser, and an optional aerodynamic package with carbon fiber front and rear spoilers.

== S7 LM ==
In 2017, Saleen announced the relaunch of the S7 sports car. The new car, called the S7 LM commemorated Saleen's success in motorsports. Additional wind tunnel development lead to modifications in the exterior design which includes a full-width rear spoiler, side skirts and under body channels along with new forged alloy wheels. The interior comes with bucket seats, a digital tachometer, shift light indicator and a 240 mph speedometer. The engine has an increased power output of 1,300 hp (969 kW). In 2019, it was reported that the power output and performance of the car were updated. The engine was now rated at 1,500 hp (1,119 kW) and 1,398 lb⋅ft (1,895 N⋅m) of torque. Performance figures include a 0-62 mph (100 km/h) acceleration time of 2.2 seconds and a claimed top speed of 298 mph (480 km/h). It wasn't clear how many cars would be made.

== S7-R ==
Saleen S7-R
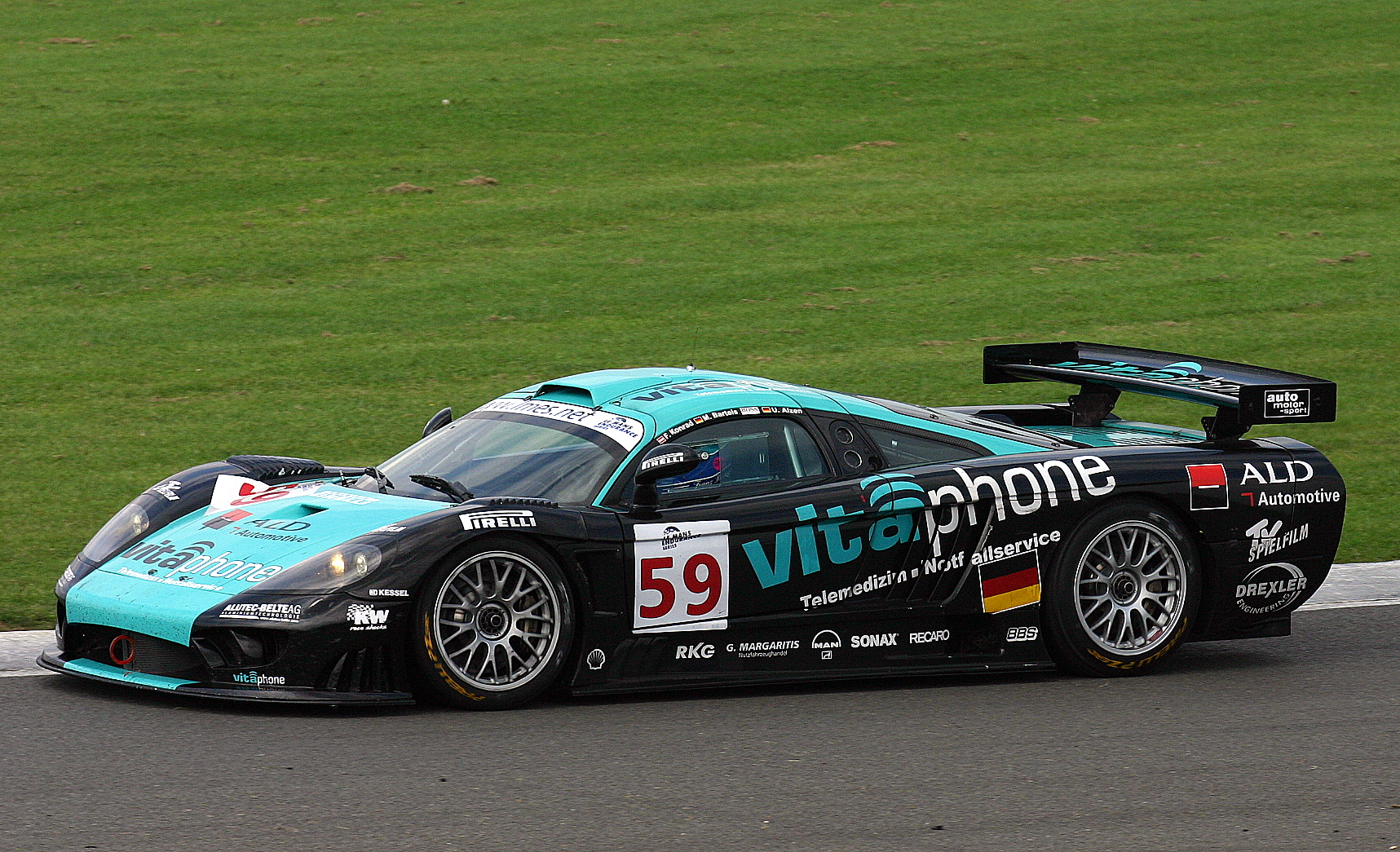
- Category: ALMS/Grand-Am GTS (GT1); FIA GT
- Constructor: Saleen
- Production: 2001–2007

Technical specifications
- Chassis: Honeycomb body panels on steel spaceframe
- Suspension: Double wishbones, pushrod-actuated coil springs over shock absorbers, anti-roll bars
- Length: 4,774 mm (188.0 in)
- Width: 1,990 mm (78 in)
- Height: 1,041 mm (41.0 in)
- Axle track: 1,748 mm (68.8 in) (front); 1,710 mm (67 in) (rear)
- Wheelbase: 2,700 mm (110 in)
- Engine: Ford Windsor 7.0 L (430 cu in) OHV 90° V8 mid-engined, rear-wheel-drive
- Torque: 550–610 lb⋅ft (750–830 N⋅m) (restricted); 740 lb⋅ft (1,000 N⋅m) (unrestricted)
- Transmission: 6-speed manual (later sequential)
- Power: 600–630 hp (450–470 kW) (restricted); 760 hp (570 kW) (unrestricted)
- Weight: 1,100–1,150 kg (2,430–2,540 lb)
- Brakes: Brembo 6-caliper vented discs
- Tires: 325/650R18" (front); 325/705R18" (rear)

Competition history
- Debut: 2001 24 Hours of Daytona

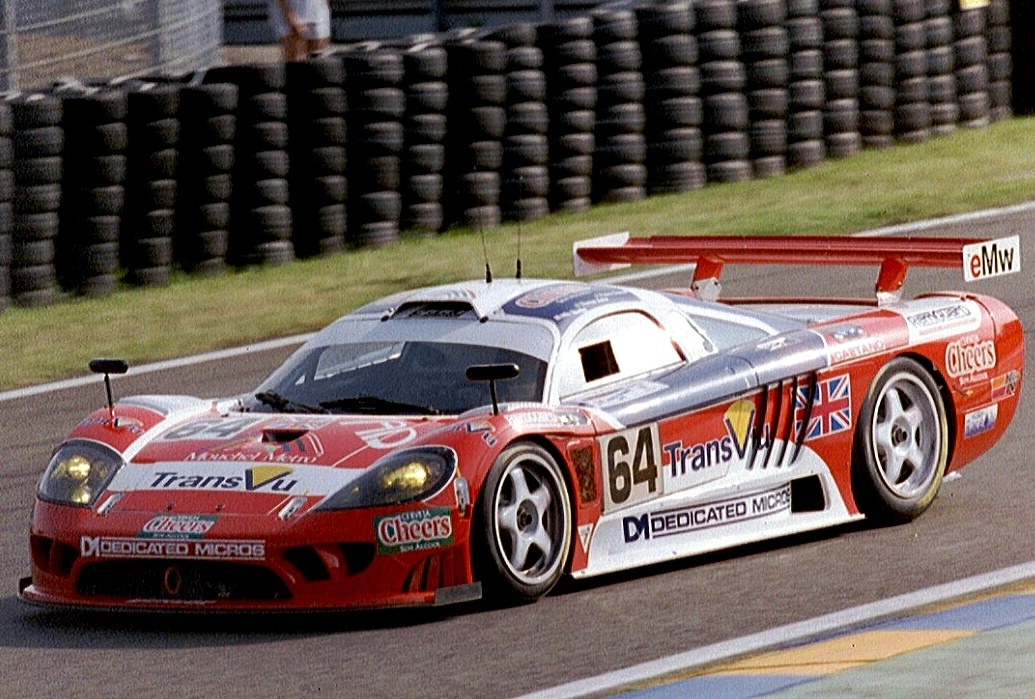
Saleen S7-R of Graham Nash Motorsports

The Saleen S7-R is a racing version of the standard, naturally aspirated S7, produced from 2000 to 2007. It was designed to compete in grand tourer–style motorsports series and events such as the American Le Mans Series, FIA GT Championship, and 24 Hours of Le Mans. The 7.0 L (427 cu. in.) naturally-aspirated V8 engine produces about 631 hp, and 610 lb-ft of torque, using two air intake restrictor plates. Unrestricted, however, the engine is capable of producing a massive 760 hp, and 740 lb-ft of torque. Ray Mallock Ltd. (RML) assembled the first few S7-Rs under the supervision of Saleen's engineering team in their workshops in Britain, before Saleen assumed control over all S7-R assembly with the French Oreca squad executing final outfitting in 2006. A total of fourteen S7-Rs were completed to race-ready condition. Seven additional S7-Rs were assembled to a level of completeness requiring the assignment of Vehicle Identification Numbers; however, these chassis were never outfitted into complete vehicles.

In 2004, Ferrari had gathered VIPs and automotive press around the world at Ferrari's Autodromo Enzo e Dino Ferrari race track for the round 8 of the FIA GT Super Racing Weekend Imola to witness the sure victory of their race cars and then new Maserati MC12 GT1 against foreign competition. Vitaphone Racing's S7-R driven by Michael Bartels and Uwe Alzen competed against two Maserati MC12s, three Ferrari 550s, three Ferrari 575s and two Lamborghini Murcielagos in GT Class specification securing the overall win. Ferrari's then CEO Luca Cordero di Montezemolo was in attendance of the race and he admitted the S7-R's victory by saying "We were no match for the Saleen today". It was regarded as one of the biggest upsets in auto racing history by the automotive press as a race car from a low volume manufacturer had beaten Ferrari at their home track.

=== Racing history ===
The Saleen S7 has been very successful in international motorsports having amassed many victories in professional racing in a number of different classes competing across the globe in America, Asia and Europe. The first S7-R assembled by RML was completed in late 2000 and made its racing debut in the American Le Mans Series event at Laguna Seca Raceway. Run by Saleen-Allen Speedlab, the car finishes in 26th place. For 2001, the first customer chassis would be completed, and their respective teams would enter various championships: Fordahl Motorsports ran in the Grand American Road Racing Championship, RML ran the European Le Mans Series, and Konrad Motorsport ran both ALMS and ELMS. This car with chassis number 001 was named Christine by Saleen engineers.

The S7-R quickly showed its capabilities, when Konrad finished in sixth place at the 12 Hours of Sebring, earning their first class victory. Fordahl won seven Grand American events en route to finishing second in the class championship, while RML won four ELMS events and won that championship by a mere point over the Konrad Saleens. Saleen-Allen Speedlab also earned a podium finish at the 24 Hours of Le Mans with an 18th-place finish overall.

For 2002, Konrad Motorsport concentrated mostly on the American Le Mans Series (the ELMS having been dissolved following 2001), while Park Place Racing took over Fordahl's entry in Grand American. Newcomer Graham Nash Motorsport won both the British GT and Spanish GT Championships. Park Place won four races and earned their first championship title, while Graham Nash won nine British GT and four Spanish GT races, earning them the title in both series. Konrad Motorsport however struggled against the faster, higher-budget Corvette Racing team and could not score any victories, but were able to finish second in the championship.

Konrad Motorsport chose to move their Saleen squad to Europe in order to compete in the FIA GT Championship in 2003, leaving North America without a full-season competitor for the S7-R as Park Place abandoned the Grand American championship. Graham Nash joined Konrad in FIA GT, earning a sixth-place finish in the championship. For 2004, Saleen would have a resurgence of teams as RML returned to run FIA GT, Dominique Dupuy's DDO team entered the FFSA GT Championship, Konrad assisted the new Vitaphone Racing, and ACEMCO Motorsports purchased two brand-new S7-Rs, modified to better compete in the American Le Mans Series. Vitaphone earned three victories in FIA GT en route to a fourth place in the championship, while DDO earned two victories in FFSA GT.

Fortunes would quickly turn for the S7-Rs in the 2005 season. Konrad and Graham Nash saw their racing efforts downsized as the teams hit economic problems. Vitaphone Racing moved on from the S7-R and raced a Maserati MC12 to the FIA GT championship. This left ACEMCO to take second in the American Le Mans Series, while DDO earned the only Saleen wins that year with three.

In an attempt to rebound from 2005, Saleen chose to concentrate on select series and events. ACEMCO dropped out from the American Le Mans Series in order to concentrate solely on entering the 2006 24 Hours of Le Mans where they earned an 11th-place finish, the best ever by a Saleen at the time. Oreca was chosen to prepare new S7-R chassis with upgrades under the supervision of Saleen engineers William Tally, Derk Hartland, Randall Speir, Matthew W. Wright and William Kreig to make them more competitive, which led to the team earning two victories in the Le Mans Series and winning the 2006 FFSA GT Championship. In FIA GT, Zakspeed took over as the factory squad with Balfe Racing running as a privateer. Zakspeed managed to earn two victories and earn themselves fourth in the championship.

For 2007, Zakspeed was forced to abandon their FIA GT effort as the team went bankrupt during the off-season. ACEMCO also was forced to withdraw and offer their S7-Rs for sale. Oreca finish-assembled two more chassis using subassemblies provided by Saleen, with one going to the Italian Racing Box squad who would compete alongside Oreca in the Le Mans Series. Oreca won four races during the season.

In 2010, the Oreca finish-assembled S7-R (chassis number 610) of Larbre Compétition won the final and its only LMGT1 class victory at the 24 Hours of Le Mans. Initial fabrication and assembly of this chassis was performed by Saleen's Irvine, CA engineering team in 2006–2007 after normal business hours due to a shortage of funding. Subsequently, Saleen engineers named the car Melissa, after the girlfriend of one of the Saleen race engineers.

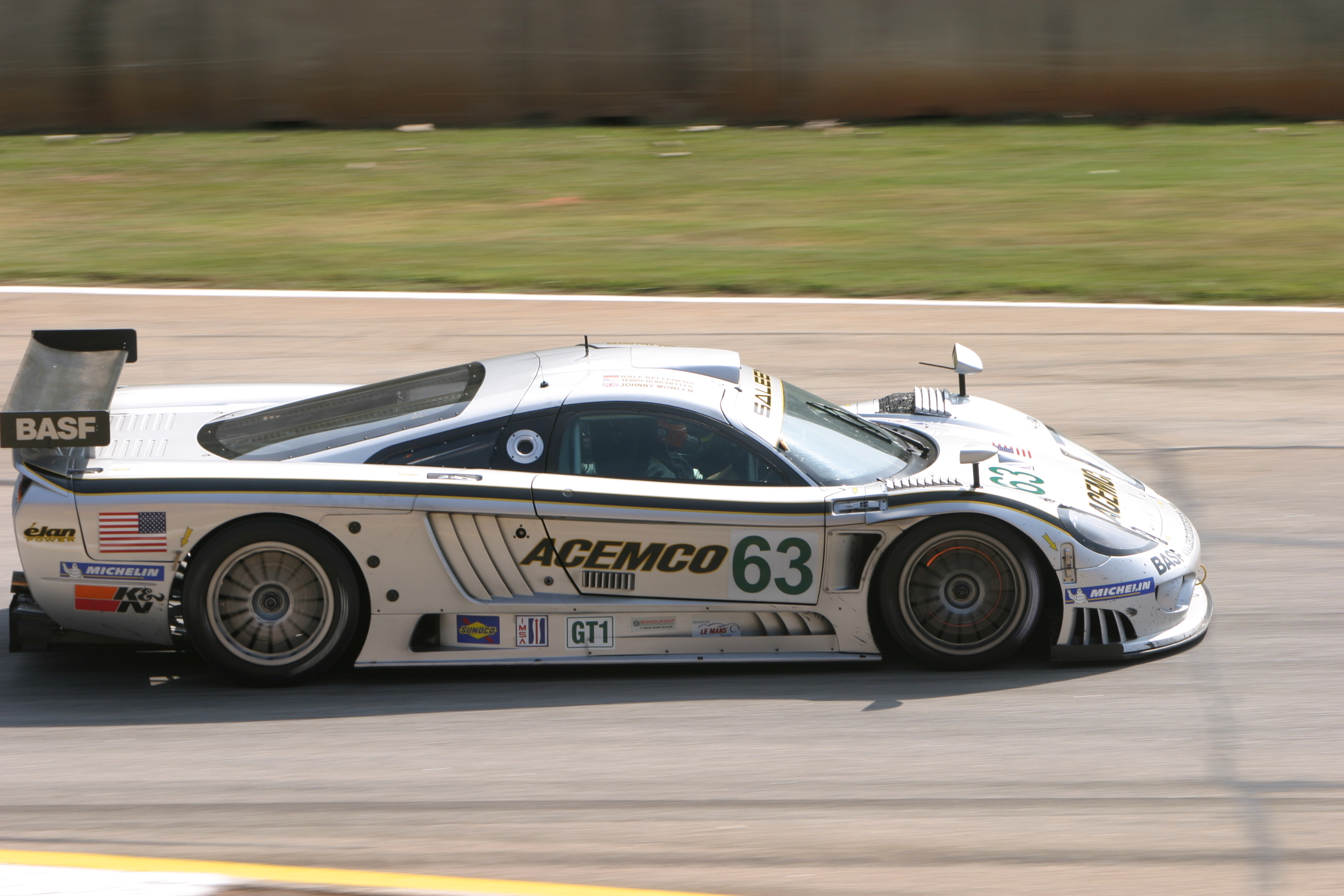
The ACEMCO Motorsports S7-R the 2005 Petit Le Mans.

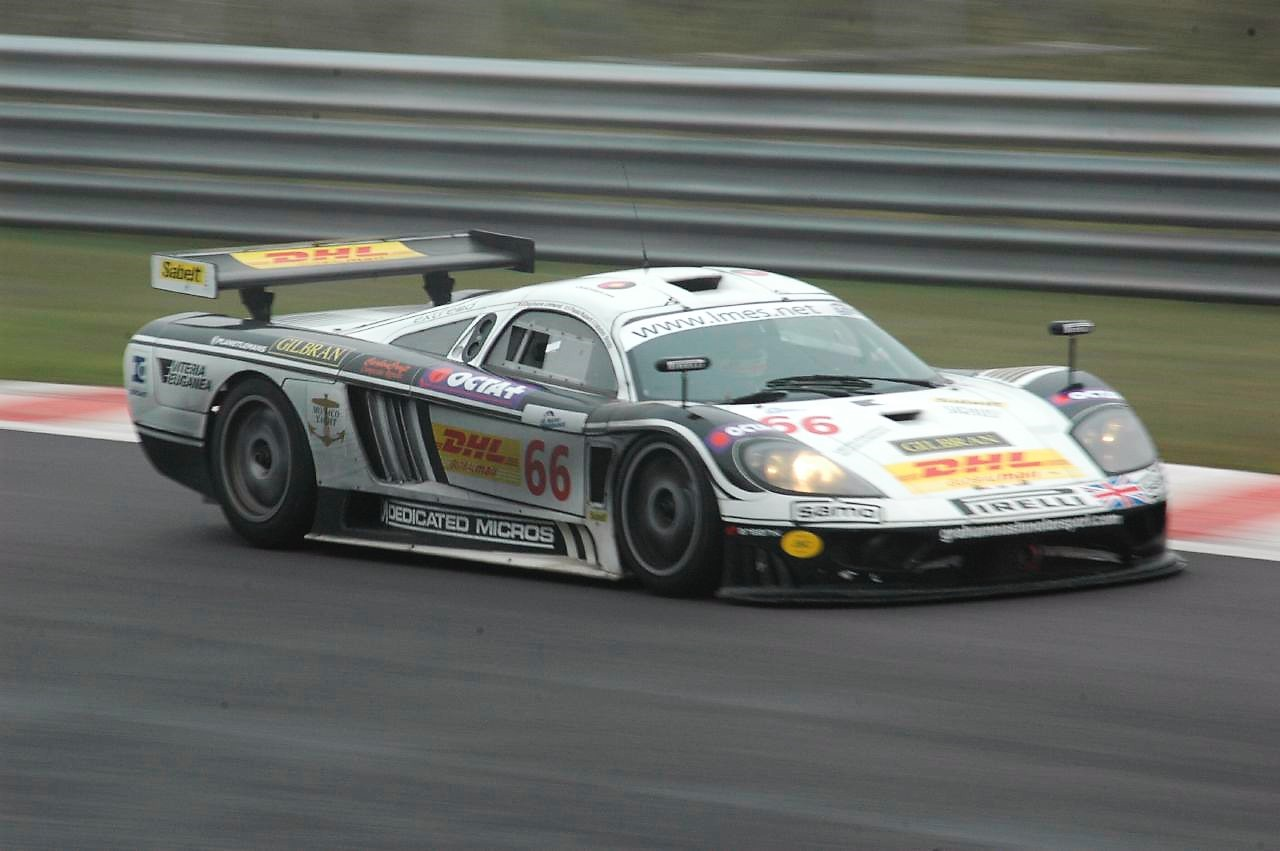
Graham Nash Motorsport's S7-R at the 2005 1000 km of Spa.

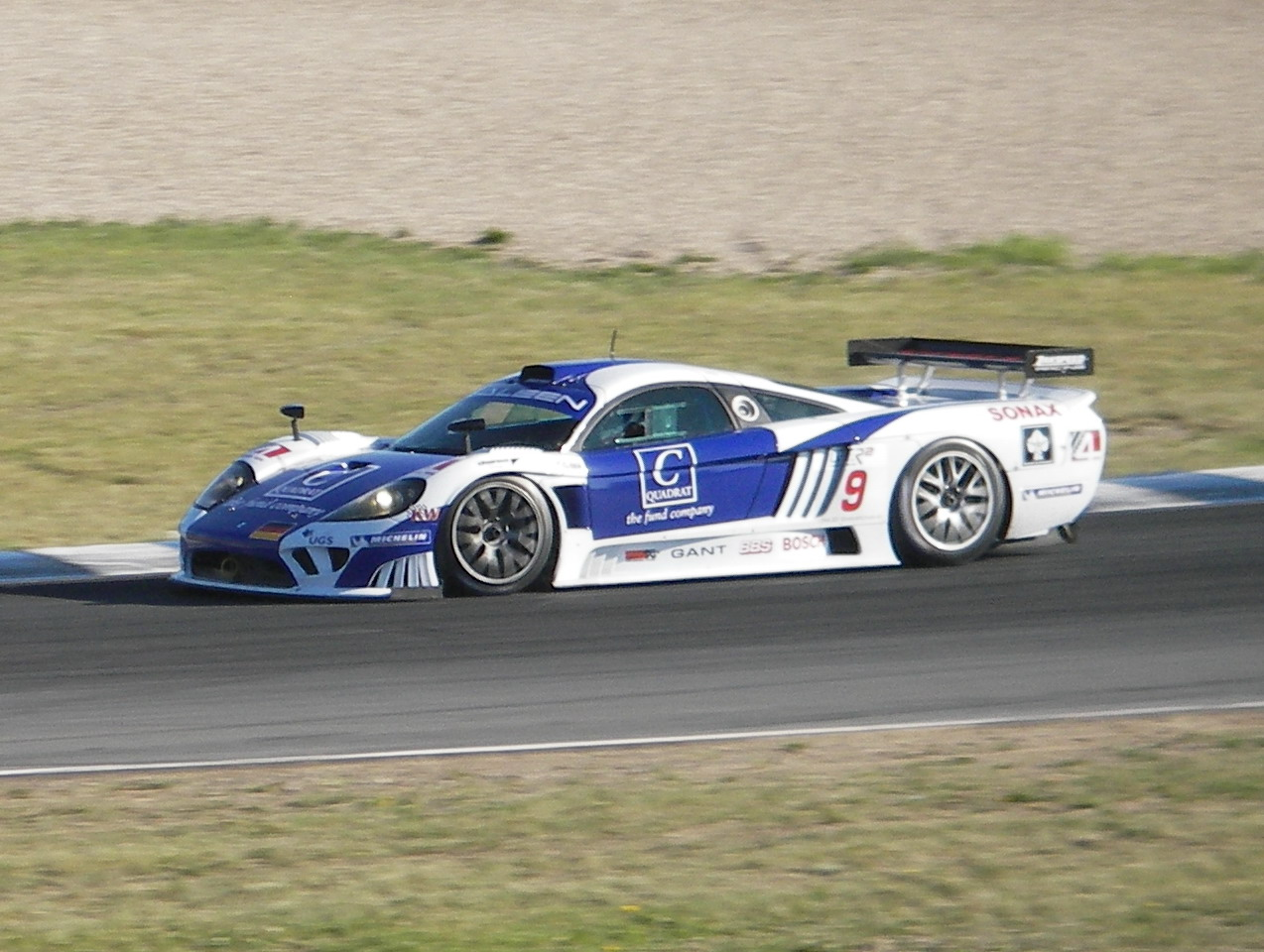
Zakspeed's S7-R in the FIA GT Championship's 2006 Oschersleben 500 km.

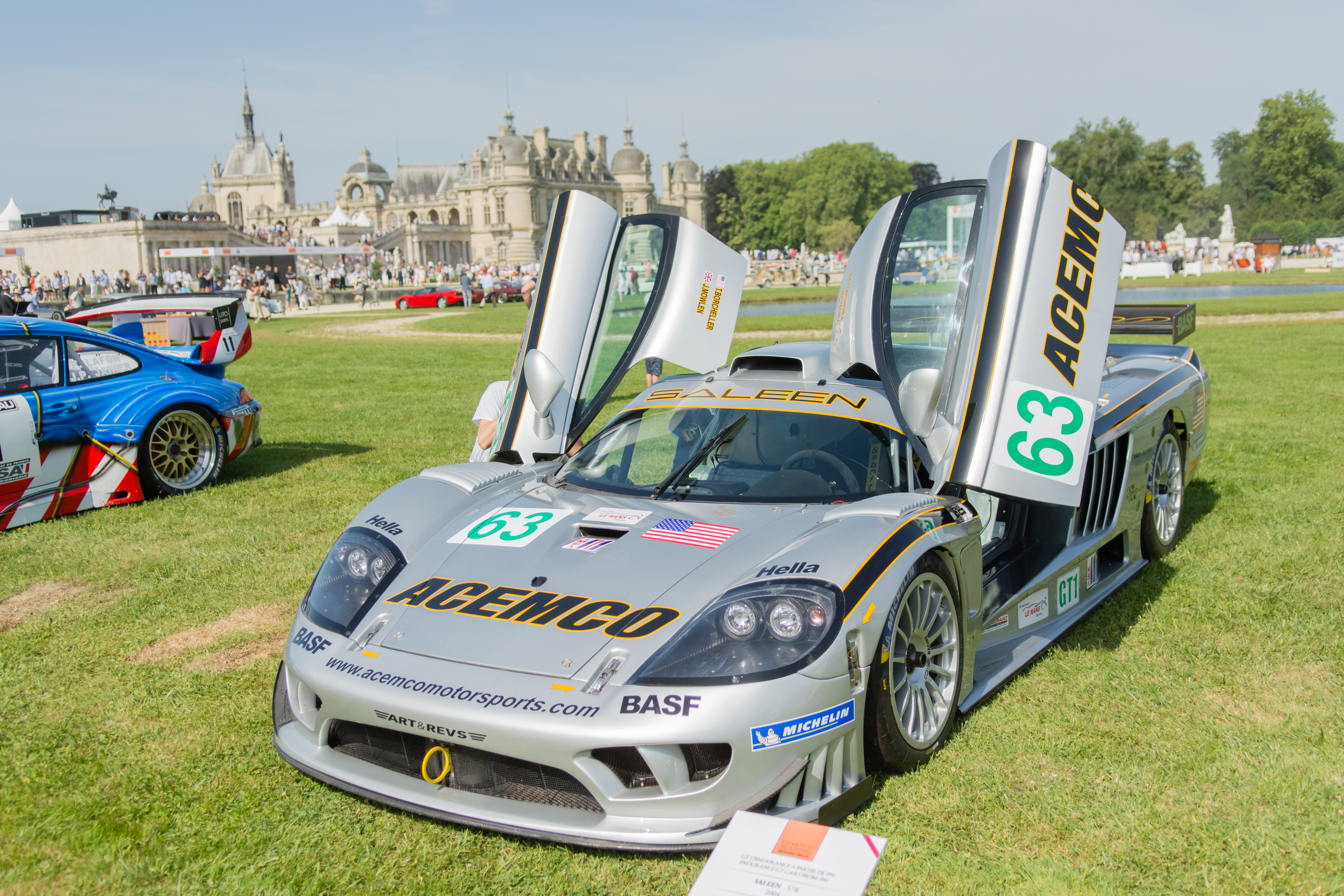
The ACEMCO Motorsports S7-R #63

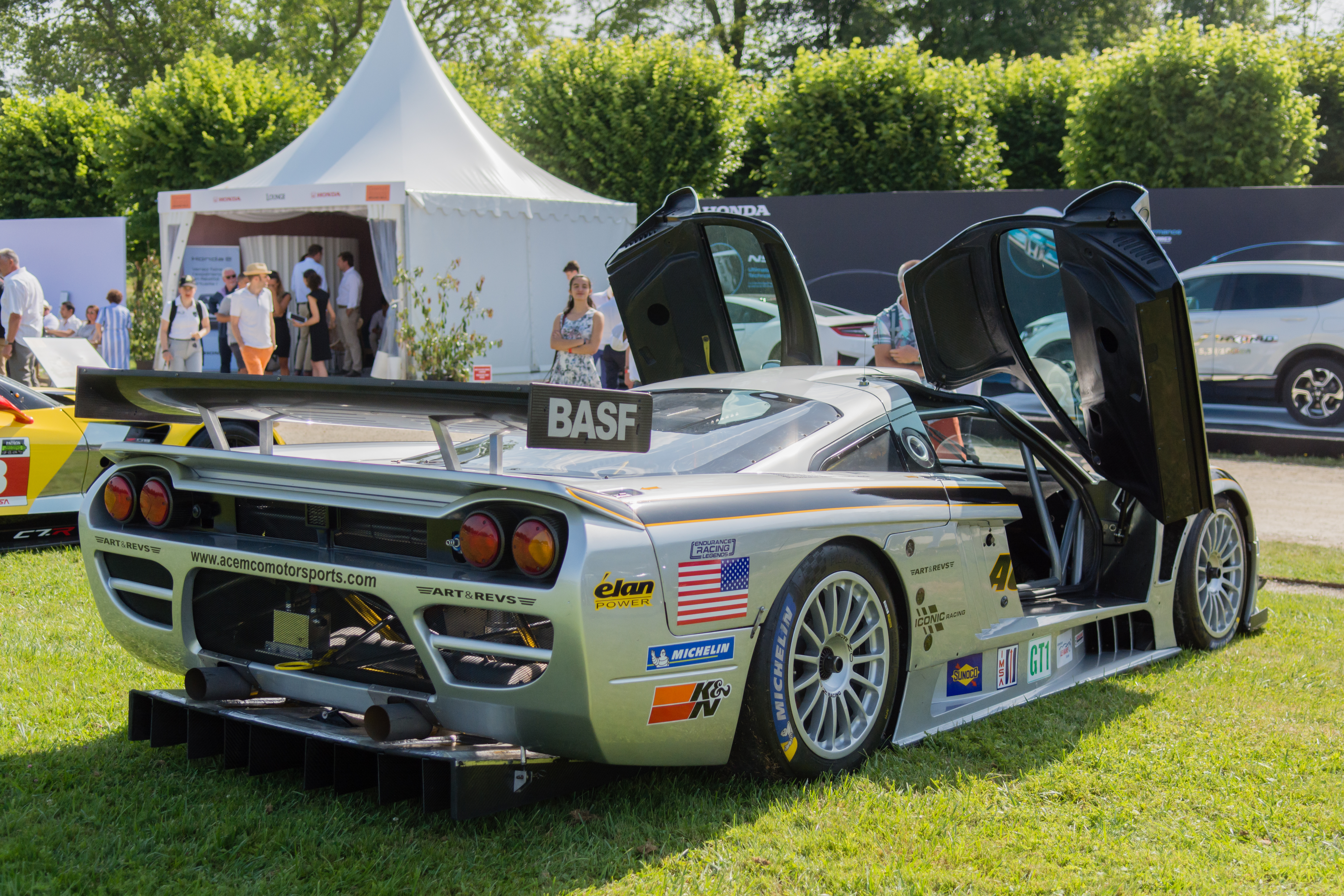
The ACEMCO Motorsports S7-R #63

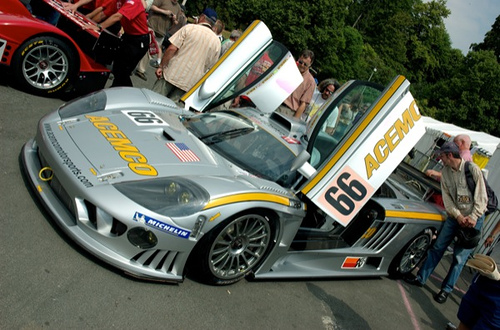
The ACEMCO Motorsports S7-R #66

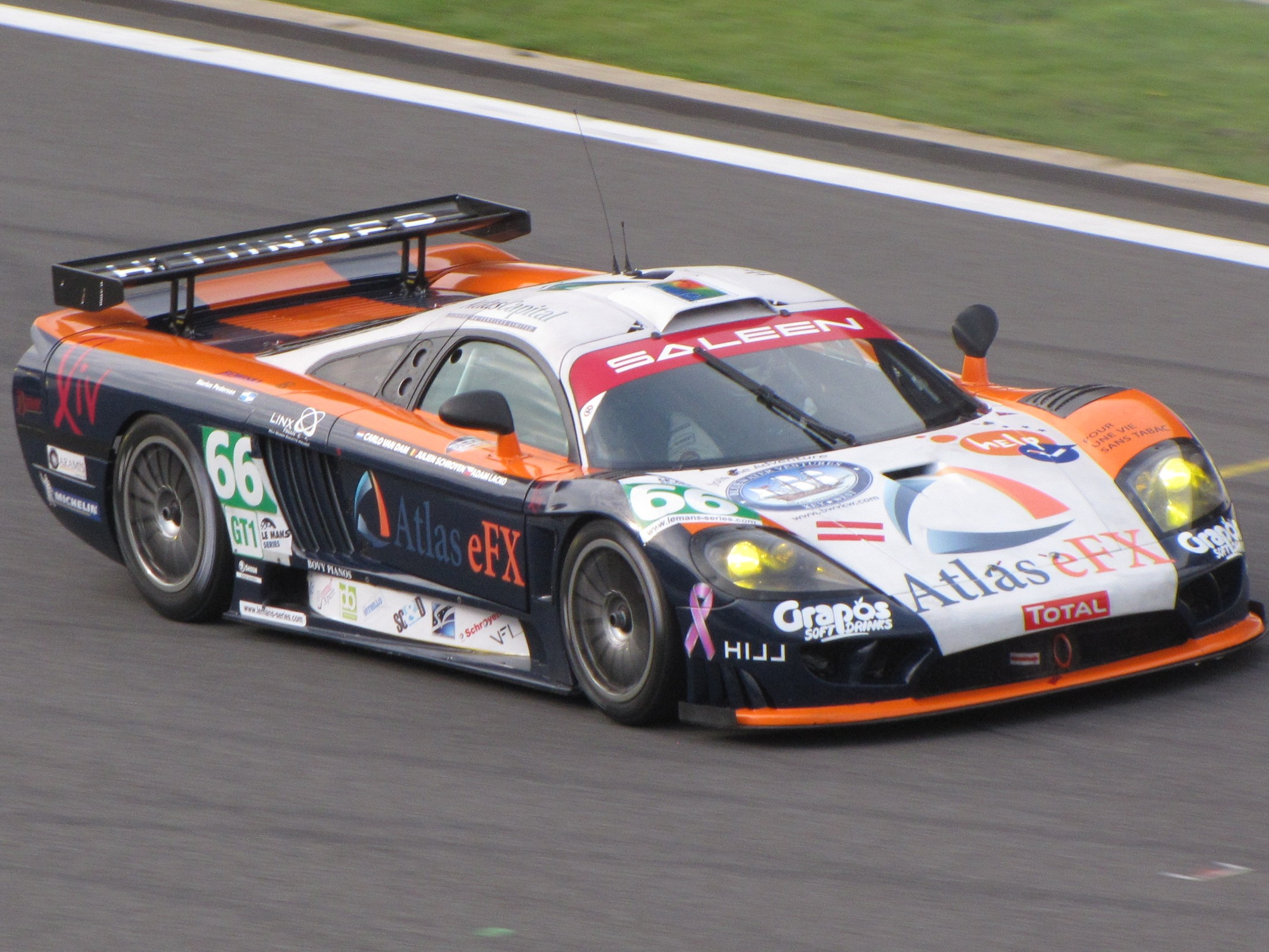
The Atlas eFX Saleen S7-R
