= Debora LMP2 =

Debora LMP2 refers to a series of Le Mans Prototypes built by Debora:

- Debora LMP200, used between 2001 and 2003.
- Debora LMP201, used in 1995.
- Debora LMP294, used in 1994.
- Debora LMP295, used in 1995.
- Debora LMP296, used between 1996 and 1999.
- Debora LMP297, used between 1997 and 1998.
- Debora LMP299, used between 2000 and 2002.
- Debora LMP2000, used in 2000.
