= 2003 1000 km of Le Mans =

Map of the Bugatti Circuit

The 2003 1000 km of Le Mans was a one-off sports car event run under the organization of the Automobile Club de l'Ouest (ACO) in preparation for the Le Mans Endurance Series that began in 2004. It was run on 9 November 2003 at the Bugatti Circuit near Le Mans, France.

== Development ==
The ACO, having previous helped in the creation of the American Le Mans Series with the running of the 1998 Petit Le Mans, as well as a failed attempt at a Japanese sportscar series with the 1999 Le Mans Fuji 1000km, created the 1000 km of Le Mans as an experimental event to gauge the desire for teams to participate in a European-based endurance sportscar series under Le Mans rules.

Previously, the FIA Sportscar and FIA GT Championships had run primarily in Europe, but were not running as a combined series, one concentrating on prototypes and the other grand tourers, and featured mostly sprint or middle-distance races. Don Panoz, creator of the American Le Mans Series, had attempted to create a European series to combine the two types of sportscars with the European Le Mans Series, but had failed to gain enough entrants. The ACO, weary of the same occurrence, decided to hold a single race to see how much participation there would actually be.

Although officially run under the Le Mans Endurance Series name, this did not count towards any championship. In order to help bolster the number of entrants, the ACO promised winners in each of the four race classes automatic invitations to the 2004 24 Hours of Le Mans.

Unlike the usual 24 Hours of Le Mans run in June at the 13 km Circuit de la Sarthe, the 1000 km of Le Mans ran on the 4.3 km Bugatti Circuit which did not use closed public roads.

== Official results ==
Class winners in bold. Cars failing to complete 75% of winner's distance marked as Not Classified (NC).

Pos	Class	No	Team	Drivers	Chassis	Tyre	Laps
Pos	Class	No	Team	Drivers	Engine	Tyre	Laps
1	**LMP900**	**5**	**Audi Sport Japan Team Goh**	**(Denmark) Tom Kristensen (Japan) Seiji Ara**	**Audi R8**	M	**208**
1	**LMP900**	**5**	**Audi Sport Japan Team Goh**	**(Denmark) Tom Kristensen (Japan) Seiji Ara**	**Audi 3.6L Turbo V8**	M	**208**
2	LMP900	2	(France) Pescarolo Sport	(France) Stéphane Sarrazin (France) Franck Lagorce (France) Sébastien Bourdais	Courage C60 Evo	M	205
2	LMP900	2	(France) Pescarolo Sport	(France) Stéphane Sarrazin (France) Franck Lagorce (France) Sébastien Bourdais	Peugeot A32 3.2L Turbo V6	M	205
3	LMP900	8	(Netherlands) Racing for Holland	(Netherlands) Jan Lammers (United Kingdom) Andy Wallace	Dome S101	D	204
3	LMP900	8	(Netherlands) Racing for Holland	(Netherlands) Jan Lammers (United Kingdom) Andy Wallace	Judd GV4 4.0L V10	D	204
4	**LMP675**	**13**	**(France) Courage Compétition**	**(Belgium) Wim Eyckmans (Russia) Roman Rusinov (Italy) Enrico Muscioni**	**Courage C65**	M	**197**
4	**LMP675**	**13**	**(France) Courage Compétition**	**(Belgium) Wim Eyckmans (Russia) Roman Rusinov (Italy) Enrico Muscioni**	**JPX 3.4L V6**	M	**197**
5	**GTS**	**88**	**(United Kingdom) Care Racing**	**(United Kingdom) Jamie Davies (United Kingdom) Darren Turner**	**Ferrari 550-GTS Maranello**	M	**195**
5	**GTS**	**88**	**(United Kingdom) Care Racing**	**(United Kingdom) Jamie Davies (United Kingdom) Darren Turner**	**Ferrari F133 5.9L V12**	M	**195**
6	GTS	80	(United Kingdom) Care Racing	(Netherlands) Peter Kox (United Kingdom) Tim Sugden	Ferrari 550-GTS Maranello	M	194
6	GTS	80	(United Kingdom) Care Racing	(Netherlands) Peter Kox (United Kingdom) Tim Sugden	Ferrari F133 5.9L V12	M	194
7	LMP675	18	(United States) Intersport Racing	(United States) Jon Field (United States) Duncan Dayton (United States) Larry Connor	Lola B01/60	G	191
7	LMP675	18	(United States) Intersport Racing	(United States) Jon Field (United States) Duncan Dayton (United States) Larry Connor	Judd KV675 3.4L V8	G	191
8	GTS	86	(France) Larbre Compétition	(France) Christophe Bouchut (Belgium) Vincent Vosse (France) Sébastian Dumez	Chrysler Viper GTS-R	M	190
8	GTS	86	(France) Larbre Compétition	(France) Christophe Bouchut (Belgium) Vincent Vosse (France) Sébastian Dumez	Chrysler 356-T6 8.0L V10	M	190
9	LMP900	9	(United Kingdom) Taurus Racing	(United Kingdom) Phil Andrews (United Kingdom) Justin Keen (Italy) Giovanni Lavaggi	Lola B2K/10	D	190
9	LMP900	9	(United Kingdom) Taurus Racing	(United Kingdom) Phil Andrews (United Kingdom) Justin Keen (Italy) Giovanni Lavaggi	Judd GV4 4.0L V10	D	190
10	**GT**	**47**	**(United Kingdom) Cirtek Motorsport**	**(Austria) Philipp Peter (Austria) Klaus Engelhorn (Italy) Andrea Montermini**	**Ferrari 360 Modena GTC**	P	**189**
10	**GT**	**47**	**(United Kingdom) Cirtek Motorsport**	**(Austria) Philipp Peter (Austria) Klaus Engelhorn (Italy) Andrea Montermini**	**Ferrari F131 3.6L V8**	P	**189**
11	GT	39	(Germany) Freisinger Motorsport	(France) Stéphane Ortelli (France) Stéphane Daoudi (Russia) Alexey Vasilyev	Porsche 996 GT3-RS	D	189
11	GT	39	(Germany) Freisinger Motorsport	(France) Stéphane Ortelli (France) Stéphane Daoudi (Russia) Alexey Vasilyev	Porsche 3.6L Flat-6	D	189
12	GT	38	(United Kingdom) PK Sport Ltd.	(United Kingdom) Robin Liddell (France) Jean-Philippe Belloc	Porsche 996 GT3-RS	P	188
12	GT	38	(United Kingdom) PK Sport Ltd.	(United Kingdom) Robin Liddell (France) Jean-Philippe Belloc	Porsche 3.6L Flat-6	P	188
13	GT	36	(United Kingdom) Sebah QM Automotive	(France) Xavier Pompidou (France) Emmanuel Collard	Porsche 996 GT3-R	D	186
13	GT	36	(United Kingdom) Sebah QM Automotive	(France) Xavier Pompidou (France) Emmanuel Collard	Porsche 3.6L Flat-6	D	186
14	GT	33	(France) Bernard Jubin	(France) Sylvain Noël (France) Christophe Tinseau	Porsche 996 GT3-RS	P	186
14	GT	33	(France) Bernard Jubin	(France) Sylvain Noël (France) Christophe Tinseau	Porsche 3.6L Flat-6	P	186
15	LMP675	24	(France) Rachel Welter	(France) Olivier Porta (France) Richard Balandras (Japan) Yojiro Terada	WR LMP01	M	185
15	LMP675	24	(France) Rachel Welter	(France) Olivier Porta (France) Richard Balandras (Japan) Yojiro Terada	Peugeot 2.0L Turbo I4	M	185
16	GT	30	(United Kingdom) Scuderia Ecosse	(United Kingdom) Tim Mullen (United Kingdom) Marino Franchitti (Canada) Chris Niarchos	Ferrari 360 Modena GTC	P	185
16	GT	30	(United Kingdom) Scuderia Ecosse	(United Kingdom) Tim Mullen (United Kingdom) Marino Franchitti (Canada) Chris Niarchos	Ferrari F131 3.6L V8	P	185
17	GT	46	(United Kingdom) DeWALT-Racesports Salisbury	(United Kingdom) Michael Caine (United Kingdom) Richard Stanton (United Kingdom) Bob Berridge	TVR Tuscan T400R	D	182
17	GT	46	(United Kingdom) DeWALT-Racesports Salisbury	(United Kingdom) Michael Caine (United Kingdom) Richard Stanton (United Kingdom) Bob Berridge	TVR Speed Six 4.0L I6	D	182
18	GT	49	(United Kingdom) Morgan Motor Company	(United Kingdom) Adam Sharpe (New Zealand) Neil Cunningham	Morgan Aero 8R	D	178
18	GT	49	(United Kingdom) Morgan Motor Company	(United Kingdom) Adam Sharpe (New Zealand) Neil Cunningham	BMW (Mader) 4.5L V8	D	178
19	GT	45	(United Kingdom) DeWALT-Racesports Salisbury	(United Kingdom) Amanda Stretton (Belgium) Fanny Duchateau (United States) Liz Halliday	TVR Tuscan T400R	D	175
19	GT	45	(United Kingdom) DeWALT-Racesports Salisbury	(United Kingdom) Amanda Stretton (Belgium) Fanny Duchateau (United States) Liz Halliday	TVR Speed Six 4.0L I6	D	175
20	LMP675	12	(France) PiR	(France) Pierre Bruneau (France) Marc Rostan	Pilbeam MP84	D	173
20	LMP675	12	(France) PiR	(France) Pierre Bruneau (France) Marc Rostan	Nissan (AER) VQL 3.0L V6	D	173
21	GT	40	(Germany) Seikel Motorsport	(United Kingdom) Johnny Mowlem (Italy) Alex Caffi (Italy) Gabrio Rosa	Porsche 996 GT3-RS	Y	173
21	GT	40	(Germany) Seikel Motorsport	(United Kingdom) Johnny Mowlem (Italy) Alex Caffi (Italy) Gabrio Rosa	Porsche 3.6L Flat-6	Y	173
22	LMP900	7	(United Kingdom) Fred Goddard	(South Africa) Earl Goddard (United Kingdom) Martin Short (United Kingdom) Warren Carway	Reynard 01Q	D	172
22	LMP900	7	(United Kingdom) Fred Goddard	(South Africa) Earl Goddard (United Kingdom) Martin Short (United Kingdom) Warren Carway	Ford (Nicholson-McLaren) 4.0L V8	D	172
23	GTS	66	(Germany) Konrad Motorsport	(Germany) Wolfgang Kaufmann (Switzerland) Toni Seiler (Austria) Franz Konrad	Saleen S7-R	D	170
23	GTS	66	(Germany) Konrad Motorsport	(Germany) Wolfgang Kaufmann (Switzerland) Toni Seiler (Austria) Franz Konrad	Ford 7.0L V8	D	170
24	GT	32	(Netherlands) System Force Motorsport	(Netherlands) Peter van Merksteijn Sr. (Netherlands) Frans Munsterhuis	Porsche 996 GT3-RS	P	169
24	GT	32	(Netherlands) System Force Motorsport	(Netherlands) Peter van Merksteijn Sr. (Netherlands) Frans Munsterhuis	Porsche 3.6L Flat-6	P	169
25	GT	42	(Netherlands) Spyker Automobilien	(Belgium) Patrick van Schoote (Germany) Norman Simon	Spyker C8 Double-12R	D	169
25	GT	42	(Netherlands) Spyker Automobilien	(Belgium) Patrick van Schoote (Germany) Norman Simon	Audi 4.0L V8	D	169
26	GT	41	(Germany) T2M Motorsport	(France) Georges Forgeois (United Kingdom) Paul Daniels (Belgium) Wim Coekelberghs	Porsche 996 GT3-RS	M	165
26	GT	41	(Germany) T2M Motorsport	(France) Georges Forgeois (United Kingdom) Paul Daniels (Belgium) Wim Coekelberghs	Porsche 3.6L Flat-6	M	165
27	LMP675	25	(France) Gerard Welter	(France) Jean-René de Fournoux (France) Bastien Brière (France) William David	WR LMP02	M	163
27	LMP675	25	(France) Gerard Welter	(France) Jean-René de Fournoux (France) Bastien Brière (France) William David	Peugeot 3.4L V6	M	163
28	GT	34	(France) Noël del Bello	(France) Jean-Luc Maury-Laribière (France) Patrick Caternet (United States) Philip Collin	Porsche 996 GT3-RS	M	161
28	GT	34	(France) Noël del Bello	(France) Jean-Luc Maury-Laribière (France) Patrick Caternet (United States) Philip Collin	Porsche 3.6L Flat-6	M	161
29	LMP900	4	(United Kingdom) Lister Racing	(United Kingdom) Jamie Campbell-Walter (United Kingdom) Nathan Kinch (Netherlands) Tom Coronel	Lister Storm LMP	D	144
29	LMP900	4	(United Kingdom) Lister Racing	(United Kingdom) Jamie Campbell-Walter (United Kingdom) Nathan Kinch (Netherlands) Tom Coronel	Chevrolet LS1 6.0L V8	D	144
NC	GT	48	(France) Olivier Baron	(France) Bruno Houzelot (France) Denis Cohignac (France) André-Alain Corbel	Porsche 996 GT3-R	P	125
NC	GT	48	(France) Olivier Baron	(France) Bruno Houzelot (France) Denis Cohignac (France) André-Alain Corbel	Porsche 3.6L Flat-6	P	125
DNF	LMP675	15	(France) Didier Bonnet Racing	(France) Renaud Derlot (Switzerland) Roland Bossy	Debora LMP200	M	141
DNF	LMP675	15	(France) Didier Bonnet Racing	(France) Renaud Derlot (Switzerland) Roland Bossy	BMW (Mader) 3.4L I6	M	141
DNF	LMGTP	10	(United States) JML Team Panoz	(Monaco) Olivier Beretta (Belgium) David Saelens	Panoz Esperante GTR-1	M	126
DNF	LMGTP	10	(United States) JML Team Panoz	(Monaco) Olivier Beretta (Belgium) David Saelens	Ford (Élan) 6L8 6.0L V8	M	126
DNF	GT	35	(France) XL Racing	(France) Gilles Vannelet (France) Bernard Rousselot (France) Gaël Lesoudier	Ferrari 550 Maranello	P	84
DNF	GT	35	(France) XL Racing	(France) Gilles Vannelet (France) Bernard Rousselot (France) Gaël Lesoudier	Ferrari F133 5.5L V12	P	84
DNF	LMP675	14	(United Kingdom) RML	(Brazil) Thomas Erdos (United Kingdom) Mike Newton (United Kingdom) Chris Goodwin	MG-Lola EX257	D	65
DNF	LMP675	14	(United Kingdom) RML	(Brazil) Thomas Erdos (United Kingdom) Mike Newton (United Kingdom) Chris Goodwin	MG (AER) XP20 2.0L Turbo I4	D	65
DNF	LMP900	6	(United States) Intersport Racing	(United States) Clint Field (United States) Rick Sutherland (Canada) John Graham	Riley & Scott Mk III C	D	23
DNF	LMP900	6	(United States) Intersport Racing	(United States) Clint Field (United States) Rick Sutherland (Canada) John Graham	Ford (Roush) 6.0L V8	D	23
DNS	GT	31	(United Kingdom) RJ Cole (United Kingdom) Xero Competition	(United Kingdom) Ricky Cole (Republic of Ireland) Peter Le Bas (United Kingdom) Paula Cook	Chevrolet Corvette LM-GT	D	-
DNS	GT	31	(United Kingdom) RJ Cole (United Kingdom) Xero Competition	(United Kingdom) Ricky Cole (Republic of Ireland) Peter Le Bas (United Kingdom) Paula Cook	Chevrolet LS1 5.7L V8	D	-
DNS	LMP900	3	(United Kingdom) Team Nasamax	(Canada) Robbie Stirling (South Africa) Werner Lupberger (France) Romain Dumas	Reynard 01Q	D	-
DNS	LMP900	3	(United Kingdom) Team Nasamax	(Canada) Robbie Stirling (South Africa) Werner Lupberger (France) Romain Dumas	Cosworth XD 2.7L Turbo V8 (Bio-Ethanol)	D	-

=== Statistics ===
- Pole Position - #5 Audi Sport Japan Team Goh - 1:27.775
- Distance - 869.44 km
- Average Speed - 144.952 km/h

== Post-Race ==
Following a successful turn out from a large number of European teams, as well as a handful of American and Japanese teams, the event was considered a success. With this, the ACO pushed forward with their development of the Le Mans Endurance Series, debuting in 2004. This move would also lead to the demise of the FIA Sportscar Championship, as prototype teams chose instead to participate in LMES.

Since this event, the LMES has not returned to Le Mans as part of their regular schedule, although many LMES participants race in the 24 Hours of Le Mans.
