= 2007 1000 km of Spa =

The Circuit de Spa-Francorchamps

The 2007 1000km of Spa was the fourth automobile endurance round for Le Mans Prototype and Le Mans Grand Touring vehicles of the 2007 Le Mans Series season. It took place at the Circuit de Spa-Francorchamps, Belgium, on 19 August 2007.

== Official results ==
Class winners in bold. Cars failing to complete 70% of winner's distance marked as Not Classified (NC).

Pos	Class	No	Team	Drivers	Chassis	Tyre	Laps
Pos	Class	No	Team	Drivers	Engine	Tyre	Laps
1	**LMP1**	**8**	**(France) Team Peugeot Total**	**(France) Stéphane Sarrazin (Portugal) Pedro Lamy**	**Peugeot 908 HDi FAP**	MI	**143**
1	**LMP1**	**8**	**(France) Team Peugeot Total**	**(France) Stéphane Sarrazin (Portugal) Pedro Lamy**	**Peugeot HDi 5.5L Turbo V12 (Diesel)**	MI	**143**
2	LMP1	16	(France) Pescarolo Sport	(France) Emmanuel Collard (France) Jean-Christophe Boullion	Pescarolo 01	MI	141
2	LMP1	16	(France) Pescarolo Sport	(France) Emmanuel Collard (France) Jean-Christophe Boullion	Judd GV5.5 S2 5.5L V10	MI	141
3	**LMP2**	**25**	**(United Kingdom) Ray Mallock Ltd. (RML)**	**(United Kingdom) Mike Newton (Brazil) Thomas Erdos**	**MG-Lola EX264**	MI	**140**
3	**LMP2**	**25**	**(United Kingdom) Ray Mallock Ltd. (RML)**	**(United Kingdom) Mike Newton (Brazil) Thomas Erdos**	**AER P07 2.0L Turbo I4**	MI	**140**
4	LMP1	17	(France) Pescarolo Sport	(Switzerland) Harold Primat (France) Christophe Tinseau	Pescarolo 01	MI	138
4	LMP1	17	(France) Pescarolo Sport	(Switzerland) Harold Primat (France) Christophe Tinseau	Judd GV5.5 S2 5.5L V10	MI	138
5	LMP2	40	(Portugal) Quifel ASM Team	(Portugal) Miguel Amaral (Spain) Miguel Ángel de Castro (Spain) Angel Burgueño	Lola B05/40	D	137
5	LMP2	40	(Portugal) Quifel ASM Team	(Portugal) Miguel Amaral (Spain) Miguel Ángel de Castro (Spain) Angel Burgueño	AER P07 2.0L Turbo I4	D	137
6	**GT1**	**55**	**(France) Team Oreca**	**(Monaco) Stéphane Ortelli (France) Soheil Ayari**	**Saleen S7-R**	MI	**137**
6	**GT1**	**55**	**(France) Team Oreca**	**(Monaco) Stéphane Ortelli (France) Soheil Ayari**	**Ford 7.0L V8**	MI	**137**
7	LMP2	27	(Switzerland) Horag Racing	(Switzerland) Fredy Lienhard (Belgium) Didier Theys (Belgium) Eric van de Poele	Lola B05/40	MI	136
7	LMP2	27	(Switzerland) Horag Racing	(Switzerland) Fredy Lienhard (Belgium) Didier Theys (Belgium) Eric van de Poele	Judd XV675 3.4L V8	MI	136
8	GT1	50	(France) Aston Martin Racing Larbre	(France) Christophe Bouchut (Italy) Fabrizio Gollin (Switzerland) Gabriele Gardel	Aston Martin DBR9	MI	136
8	GT1	50	(France) Aston Martin Racing Larbre	(France) Christophe Bouchut (Italy) Fabrizio Gollin (Switzerland) Gabriele Gardel	Aston Martin 6.0L V12	MI	136
9	GT1	72	(France) Luc Alphand Aventures	(France) Luc Alphand (France) Jérôme Policand (France) Patrice Goueslard	Chevrolet Corvette C6.R	MI	134
9	GT1	72	(France) Luc Alphand Aventures	(France) Luc Alphand (France) Jérôme Policand (France) Patrice Goueslard	Chevrolet LS7.R 7.0L V8	MI	134
10	GT1	59	(United Kingdom) Team Modena	(Spain) Antonio García (Brazil) Christian Fittipaldi	Aston Martin DBR9	MI	134
10	GT1	59	(United Kingdom) Team Modena	(Spain) Antonio García (Brazil) Christian Fittipaldi	Aston Martin 6.0L V12	MI	134
11	LMP2	35	(Spain) Saulnier Racing	(France) Jacques Nicolet (France) Alain Filhol (France) Bruce Jouanny	Courage LC75	MI	133
11	LMP2	35	(Spain) Saulnier Racing	(France) Jacques Nicolet (France) Alain Filhol (France) Bruce Jouanny	AER P07 2.0L Turbo I4	MI	133
12	LMP1	18	(United Kingdom) Rollcentre Racing	(United Kingdom) Stuart Hall (Portugal) João Barbosa (United Kingdom) Martin Short	Pescarolo 01	D	133
12	LMP1	18	(United Kingdom) Rollcentre Racing	(United Kingdom) Stuart Hall (Portugal) João Barbosa (United Kingdom) Martin Short	Judd GV5.5 S2 5.5L V10	D	133
13	GT1	65	(Austria) Jetalliance Racing	(Austria) Karl Wendlinger (Austria) Lukas Lichtner-Hoyer (Austria) Thomas Grüber	Aston Martin DBR9	MI	132
13	GT1	65	(Austria) Jetalliance Racing	(Austria) Karl Wendlinger (Austria) Lukas Lichtner-Hoyer (Austria) Thomas Grüber	Aston Martin 6.0L V12	MI	132
14	LMP2	31	(United States) Binnie Motorsports	(United States) William Binnie (United Kingdom) Allen Timpany (United Kingdom) Chris Buncombe	Lola B05/42	MI	132
14	LMP2	31	(United States) Binnie Motorsports	(United States) William Binnie (United Kingdom) Allen Timpany (United Kingdom) Chris Buncombe	Zytek ZG348 3.4L V8	MI	132
15	LMP1	19	(United Kingdom) Chamberlain-Synergy Motorsport	(United Kingdom) Gareth Evans (United Kingdom) Bob Berridge (United Kingdom) Peter Owen	Lola B06/10	MI	132
15	LMP1	19	(United Kingdom) Chamberlain-Synergy Motorsport	(United Kingdom) Gareth Evans (United Kingdom) Bob Berridge (United Kingdom) Peter Owen	AER P32T 4.0L Turbo V8	MI	132
16	LMP1	9	(United Kingdom) Creation Autosportif	(United Kingdom) Jamie Campbell-Walter (Japan) Shinji Nakano^{†} (Switzerland) Felipe Ortiz	Creation CA07	D	130
16	LMP1	9	(United Kingdom) Creation Autosportif	(United Kingdom) Jamie Campbell-Walter (Japan) Shinji Nakano^{†} (Switzerland) Felipe Ortiz	Judd GV5.5 S2 5.5L V10	D	130
17	**GT2**	**77**	**(Germany) Team Felbermayr-Proton**	**(Germany) Marc Lieb (France) Xavier Pompidou**	**Porsche 997 GT3-RSR**	P	**130**
17	**GT2**	**77**	**(Germany) Team Felbermayr-Proton**	**(Germany) Marc Lieb (France) Xavier Pompidou**	**Porsche 3.8L Flat-6**	P	**130**
18	GT2	96	(United Kingdom) Virgo Motorsport	(United Kingdom) Robert Bell (Denmark) Allan Simonsen	Ferrari F430GT	D	129
18	GT2	96	(United Kingdom) Virgo Motorsport	(United Kingdom) Robert Bell (Denmark) Allan Simonsen	Ferrari 4.0L V8	D	129
19	GT2	97	(Italy) G.P.C. Sport	(Spain) Sergio Hernández (Italy) Alessandro Bonetti (Italy) Fabrizio de Simone	Ferrari F430GT	P	128
19	GT2	97	(Italy) G.P.C. Sport	(Spain) Sergio Hernández (Italy) Alessandro Bonetti (Italy) Fabrizio de Simone	Ferrari 4.0L V8	P	128
20	GT2	90	(Germany) Farnbacher Racing	(Germany) Pierre Ehret (Germany) Dirk Werner (Denmark) Lars-Erik Nielsen	Porsche 997 GT3-RSR	P	128
20	GT2	90	(Germany) Farnbacher Racing	(Germany) Pierre Ehret (Germany) Dirk Werner (Denmark) Lars-Erik Nielsen	Porsche 3.8L Flat-6	P	128
21	GT1	51	(France) Aston Martin Racing Larbre	(Belgium) Gregory Franchi (Switzerland) Steve Zacchia (United Kingdom) Gregor Fisken	Aston Martin DBR9	MI	126
21	GT1	51	(France) Aston Martin Racing Larbre	(Belgium) Gregory Franchi (Switzerland) Steve Zacchia (United Kingdom) Gregor Fisken	Aston Martin 6.0L V12	MI	126
22	GT2	78	(Italy) Scuderia Villorba Corse	(Italy) Alex Caffi (Italy) Denny Zardo	Ferrari F430GT	P	126
22	GT2	78	(Italy) Scuderia Villorba Corse	(Italy) Alex Caffi (Italy) Denny Zardo	Ferrari 4.0L V8	P	126
23	GT2	98	(Belgium) Ice Pol Racing Team	(Belgium) Yves Lambert (Belgium) Christian Lefort (Belgium) Stéphane Lémeret	Ferrari F430GT	P	126
23	GT2	98	(Belgium) Ice Pol Racing Team	(Belgium) Yves Lambert (Belgium) Christian Lefort (Belgium) Stéphane Lémeret	Ferrari 4.0L V8	P	126
24	GT2	88	(Germany) Team Felbermayr-Proton	(Germany) Christian Ried (Austria) Horst Felbermayr Jr. (Germany) Marc Basseng	Porsche 997 GT3-RSR	P	126
24	GT2	88	(Germany) Team Felbermayr-Proton	(Germany) Christian Ried (Austria) Horst Felbermayr Jr. (Germany) Marc Basseng	Porsche 3.8L Flat-6	P	126
25	LMP1	15	(Czech Republic) Charouz Racing System	(Czech Republic) Jan Charouz (Germany) Stefan Mücke	Lola B07/17	MI	125
25	LMP1	15	(Czech Republic) Charouz Racing System	(Czech Republic) Jan Charouz (Germany) Stefan Mücke	Judd GV5.5 S2 5.5L V10	MI	125
26	GT2	94	(Switzerland) Speedy Racing Team	(Switzerland) Andrea Chiesa (United Kingdom) Jonny Kane (Italy) Andrea Belicchi	Spyker C8 Spyder GT2-R	D	124
26	GT2	94	(Switzerland) Speedy Racing Team	(Switzerland) Andrea Chiesa (United Kingdom) Jonny Kane (Italy) Andrea Belicchi	Audi 3.8L V8	D	124
27	GT2	80	(Belgium) Prospeed Competition	(Belgium) Rudi Penders (Belgium) Franz Lamot (Belgium) Bart Couwberghs	Porsche 997 GT3-RSR	MI	123
27	GT2	80	(Belgium) Prospeed Competition	(Belgium) Rudi Penders (Belgium) Franz Lamot (Belgium) Bart Couwberghs	Porsche 3.8L Flat-6	MI	123
28	GT2	99	(Monaco) JMB Racing	(Switzerland) Paolo Maurizio Basso (United Kingdom) Bo McCormick (Netherlands) Peter Kutemann	Ferrari F430GT	D	122
28	GT2	99	(Monaco) JMB Racing	(Switzerland) Paolo Maurizio Basso (United Kingdom) Bo McCormick (Netherlands) Peter Kutemann	Ferrari 4.0L V8	D	122
29	GT2	95	(United Kingdom) James Watt Automotive	(United Kingdom) Paul Daniels (United Kingdom) Dave Cox (Switzerland) Joël Camathias	Porsche 997 GT3-RSR	D	120
29	GT2	95	(United Kingdom) James Watt Automotive	(United Kingdom) Paul Daniels (United Kingdom) Dave Cox (Switzerland) Joël Camathias	Porsche 3.8L Flat-6	D	120
30	GT2	79	(Germany) Team Felbermayr-Proton	(Austria) Horst Felbermayr Sr. (Germany) Gerold Ried (United States) Philip Collin	Porsche 911 GT3-RSR	P	112
30	GT2	79	(Germany) Team Felbermayr-Proton	(Austria) Horst Felbermayr Sr. (Germany) Gerold Ried (United States) Philip Collin	Porsche 3.6L Flat-6	P	112
31	LMP2	45	(United Kingdom) Embassy Racing	(United Kingdom) Warren Hughes (United Kingdom) Darren Manning	Radical SR9	D	110
31	LMP2	45	(United Kingdom) Embassy Racing	(United Kingdom) Warren Hughes (United Kingdom) Darren Manning	Judd XV675 3.4L V8	D	110
32 NC	LMP2	26	(Italy) Ranieri Randaccio	(Italy) Ranieri Randaccio (Italy) Gianni Collini	Lucchini LMP2/04	D	97
32 NC	LMP2	26	(Italy) Ranieri Randaccio	(Italy) Ranieri Randaccio (Italy) Gianni Collini	Nicholson-McLaren 3.3L V8	D	97
33 DNF	LMP2	32	(France) Barazi-Epsilon	(Denmark) Juan Barazi (Netherlands) Michael Vergers (Saudi Arabia) Karim Ojjeh	Zytek 07S/2	MI	125
33 DNF	LMP2	32	(France) Barazi-Epsilon	(Denmark) Juan Barazi (Netherlands) Michael Vergers (Saudi Arabia) Karim Ojjeh	Zytek ZG348 3.4L V8	MI	125
34 DNF	GT2	83	(Italy) G.P.C. Sport	(Italy) Luca Drudi (Italy) Gabrio Rosa (United Kingdom) Johnny Mowlem	Ferrari F430GT	P	113
34 DNF	GT2	83	(Italy) G.P.C. Sport	(Italy) Luca Drudi (Italy) Gabrio Rosa (United Kingdom) Johnny Mowlem	Ferrari 4.0L V8	P	113
35 DNF	GT2	85	(Netherlands) Spyker Squadron	(Czech Republic) Jaroslav Janiš (Netherlands) Peter Kox	Spyker C8 Spyder GT2-R	D	108
35 DNF	GT2	85	(Netherlands) Spyker Squadron	(Czech Republic) Jaroslav Janiš (Netherlands) Peter Kox	Audi 3.8L V8	D	108
36 DNF	GT2	76	(France) IMSA Performance Matmut	(France) Raymond Narac (Austria) Richard Lietz	Porsche 997 GT3-RSR	MI	83
36 DNF	GT2	76	(France) IMSA Performance Matmut	(France) Raymond Narac (Austria) Richard Lietz	Porsche 3.8L Flat-6	MI	83
37 DNF	LMP2	21	(United Kingdom) Team Bruichladdich Radical	(United Kingdom) Tim Greaves (United Kingdom) Stuart Moseley	Radical SR9	D	81
37 DNF	LMP2	21	(United Kingdom) Team Bruichladdich Radical	(United Kingdom) Tim Greaves (United Kingdom) Stuart Moseley	AER P07 2.0L Turbo I4	D	81
38 DNF	GT2	84	(United Kingdom) Chad Peninsula Panoz	(United Kingdom) John Harsthorne (United Kingdom) Sean McInerney (United Kingdom) Michael McInerney	Panoz Esperante GT-LM	P	66
38 DNF	GT2	84	(United Kingdom) Chad Peninsula Panoz	(United Kingdom) John Harsthorne (United Kingdom) Sean McInerney (United Kingdom) Michael McInerney	Ford (Élan) 5.0L V8	P	66
39 DNF	GT2	82	(United Kingdom) Team LNT	(United Kingdom) Richard Dean (United Kingdom) Lawrence Tomlinson	Panoz Esperante GT-LM	P	58
39 DNF	GT2	82	(United Kingdom) Team LNT	(United Kingdom) Richard Dean (United Kingdom) Lawrence Tomlinson	Ford (Élan) 5.0L V8	P	58
40 DNF	GT2	81	(United Kingdom) Team LNT	(United Kingdom) Tom Kimber-Smith (United Kingdom) Danny Watts	Panoz Esperante GT-LM	P	58
40 DNF	GT2	81	(United Kingdom) Team LNT	(United Kingdom) Tom Kimber-Smith (United Kingdom) Danny Watts	Ford (Élan) 5.0L V8	P	58
41 DNF	GT1	73	(France) Luc Alphand Aventures	(France) Jean-Luc Blanchemain (France) Sébastien Dumez (Belgium) Vincent Vosse	Chevrolet Corvette C5-R	MI	53
41 DNF	GT1	73	(France) Luc Alphand Aventures	(France) Jean-Luc Blanchemain (France) Sébastien Dumez (Belgium) Vincent Vosse	Chevrolet LS7.R 7.0L V8	MI	53
42 DNF	LMP1	3	(Monaco) Scuderia Lavaggi	(Italy) Giovanni Lavaggi (Germany) Wolfgang Kaufmann	Lavaggi LS1	D	49
42 DNF	LMP1	3	(Monaco) Scuderia Lavaggi	(Italy) Giovanni Lavaggi (Germany) Wolfgang Kaufmann	Ford (PME) 6.0L V8	D	49
43 DNF	LMP2	44	(Germany) Kruse Motorsport	(France) Jean de Pourtales (Austria) Norbert Siedler	Pescarolo 01	KU	46
43 DNF	LMP2	44	(Germany) Kruse Motorsport	(France) Jean de Pourtales (Austria) Norbert Siedler	Judd XV675 3.4L V8	KU	46
44 DNF	LMP2	20	(France) Pierre Bruneau	(France) Pierre Bruneau (France) Marc Rostan (United Kingdom) Simon Pullan	Pilbeam MP93	MI	37
44 DNF	LMP2	20	(France) Pierre Bruneau	(France) Pierre Bruneau (France) Marc Rostan (United Kingdom) Simon Pullan	Judd XV675 3.4L V8	MI	37
45 DNF	LMP1	10	(United Kingdom) Arena Motorsports International	(Japan) Hayanari Shimoda (Sweden) Stefan Johansson	Zytek 07S	MI	33
45 DNF	LMP1	10	(United Kingdom) Arena Motorsports International	(Japan) Hayanari Shimoda (Sweden) Stefan Johansson	Zytek 2ZG408 4.0L V8	MI	33
46 DNF	LMP1	7	(France) Team Peugeot Total	(France) Nicolas Minassian (Spain) Marc Gené	Peugeot 908 HDi FAP	MI	32
46 DNF	LMP1	7	(France) Team Peugeot Total	(France) Nicolas Minassian (Spain) Marc Gené	Peugeot HDi 5.5L Turbo V12 (Diesel)	MI	32
47 DNF	GT1	61	(Italy) Racing Box	(Italy) Piergiuseppe Perazzini (Italy) Marco Cioci (Belgium) Kurt Mollekens	Saleen S7-R	MI	29
47 DNF	GT1	61	(Italy) Racing Box	(Italy) Piergiuseppe Perazzini (Italy) Marco Cioci (Belgium) Kurt Mollekens	Ford 7.0L V8	MI	29
48 DNF	GT2	89	(Denmark) Team Markland Racing	(Denmark) Kurt Thiim (Denmark) Thorkild Thyrring	Chevrolet Corvette Z06	D	25
48 DNF	GT2	89	(Denmark) Team Markland Racing	(Denmark) Kurt Thiim (Denmark) Thorkild Thyrring	Chevrolet LS7 7.0L V8	D	25
49 DNF	LMP1	13	(France) Courage Compétition	(France) Jean-Marc Gounon (France) Guillaume Moreau (Russia) Vitaly Petrov	Courage LC70	MI	23
49 DNF	LMP1	13	(France) Courage Compétition	(France) Jean-Marc Gounon (France) Guillaume Moreau (Russia) Vitaly Petrov	AER P32T 3.6L Turbo V8	MI	23
50 DNF	LMP1	12	(France) Courage Compétition	(Switzerland) Alexander Frei (France) Jonathan Cochet	Courage LC70	MI	15
50 DNF	LMP1	12	(France) Courage Compétition	(Switzerland) Alexander Frei (France) Jonathan Cochet	AER P32T 3.6L Turbo V8	MI	15

† - Shinji Nakano was excluded from the results of the race for avoidable contact with another car.

== Statistics ==
- Pole Position - #7 Team Peugeot Total - 2:00.105
- Fastest Lap - #8 Team Peugeot Total - 2:03.316
- Average Speed - 172.790 km/h

Le Mans Series
Previous race: 2007 1000km of Nürburgring	2007 season	Next race: 2007 1000km of Silverstone
