= 2000 24 Hours of Le Mans =

68th 24 Hours of Le Mans endurance race

Previous: 1999	Next: 2001
Index: Races | Winners

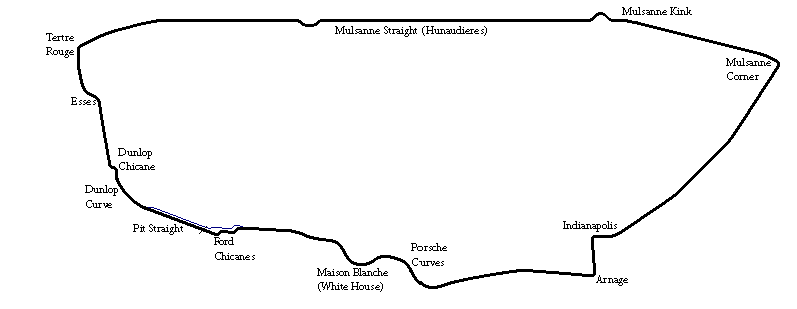
Le Mans in 2000

The 2000 24 Hours of Le Mans was the 68th Grand Prix of Endurance, and took place on 17 and 18 June 2000.

== Pre-race ==
After the 1999 race, most of the manufacturers in the top classes went in different directions. BMW and Toyota went into Formula One, while Mercedes-Benz left sportscar racing after the CLR accidents, returning to the DTM. Nissan also left due to financial difficulties.

Other than the French privateers Pescarolo, Oreca and DAMS, only Audi and Panoz remained from the previous year, while newcomer Cadillac joined.

== Race notes ==
Approximately 200,000 people attended the race. The 1-2-3 finish of the Audi LMP900s marked the beginning of two dynasties, Audi's and Tom Kristensen's in the top-finishing Audi.

The Oreca team's GTS class winning, seventh place overall, 333 lap finish with the Chrysler Viper was the best ever with that car. It faced serious competition within its class from Corvette Racing's new C5.R., which would within the next two years top the Viper's distance record and establish itself as the car to beat among the GT classes.

== Official results ==
Class winners are denoted in bold.

Pos	Class	No	Team	Drivers	Chassis	Tyre	Laps
Pos	Class	No	Team	Drivers	Engine	Tyre	Laps
1	**LMP900**	**8**	**(Germany) Audi Sport Team Joest**	**(Germany) Frank Biela (Denmark) Tom Kristensen (Italy) Emanuele Pirro**	**Audi R8**	M	**368**
1	**LMP900**	**8**	**(Germany) Audi Sport Team Joest**	**(Germany) Frank Biela (Denmark) Tom Kristensen (Italy) Emanuele Pirro**	**Audi 3.6 L Turbo V8**	M	**368**
2	LMP900	9	(Germany) Audi Sport Team Joest	(France) Laurent Aïello (United Kingdom) Allan McNish (Monaco) Stéphane Ortelli	Audi R8	M	367
2	LMP900	9	(Germany) Audi Sport Team Joest	(France) Laurent Aïello (United Kingdom) Allan McNish (Monaco) Stéphane Ortelli	Audi 3.6 L Turbo V8	M	367
3	LMP900	7	(Germany) Audi Sport Team Joest	(Germany) Christian Abt (Italy) Michele Alboreto (Italy) Rinaldo Capello	Audi R8	M	365
3	LMP900	7	(Germany) Audi Sport Team Joest	(Germany) Christian Abt (Italy) Michele Alboreto (Italy) Rinaldo Capello	Audi 3.6 L Turbo V8	M	365
4	LMP900	16	(France) Pescarolo Sport	(France) Olivier Grouillard (France) Sébastien Bourdais (France) Emmanuel Clérico	Courage C52	M	344
4	LMP900	16	(France) Pescarolo Sport	(France) Olivier Grouillard (France) Sébastien Bourdais (France) Emmanuel Clérico	Peugeot A32 3.2 L Turbo V6	M	344
5	LMP900	12	(United States) Panoz Motorsports	(United States) Johnny O'Connell (Japan) Hiroki Katoh (France) Pierre-Henri Raphanel	Panoz LMP-1 Roadster-S	M	342
5	LMP900	12	(United States) Panoz Motorsports	(United States) Johnny O'Connell (Japan) Hiroki Katoh (France) Pierre-Henri Raphanel	Élan 6L8 6.0 L V8	M	342
6	LMP900	23	(Japan) TV Asahi Team Dragon	(Japan) Toshio Suzuki (Japan) Masami Kageyama (Japan) Masahiko Kageyama	Panoz LMP-1 Roadster-S	M	340
6	LMP900	23	(Japan) TV Asahi Team Dragon	(Japan) Toshio Suzuki (Japan) Masami Kageyama (Japan) Masahiko Kageyama	Élan 6L8 6.0 L V8	M	340
7	**LMGTS**	**51**	**(France) Viper Team Oreca**	**(France) Dominique Dupuy (Monaco) Olivier Beretta (Austria) Karl Wendlinger**	**Chrysler Viper GTS-R**	M	**333**
7	**LMGTS**	**51**	**(France) Viper Team Oreca**	**(France) Dominique Dupuy (Monaco) Olivier Beretta (Austria) Karl Wendlinger**	**Chrysler 8.0 L V10**	M	**333**
8	LMP900	22	(Japan) TV Asahi Team Dragon	(Japan) Keiichi Tsuchiya (Japan) Akira Iida (Japan) Masahiko Kondo	Panoz LMP-1 Roadster-S	M	330
8	LMP900	22	(Japan) TV Asahi Team Dragon	(Japan) Keiichi Tsuchiya (Japan) Akira Iida (Japan) Masahiko Kondo	Élan 6L8 6.0 L V8	M	330
9	LMGTS	53	(France) Viper Team Oreca	(United States) David Donohue (Portugal) Ni Amorim (France) Anthony Beltoise	Chrysler Viper GTS-R	M	328
9	LMGTS	53	(France) Viper Team Oreca	(United States) David Donohue (Portugal) Ni Amorim (France) Anthony Beltoise	Chrysler 8.0 L V10	M	328
10	LMGTS	64	(United States) Corvette Racing	(France) Franck Fréon (United States) Andy Pilgrim (United States) Kelly Collins	Chevrolet Corvette C5-R	G	327
10	LMGTS	64	(United States) Corvette Racing	(France) Franck Fréon (United States) Andy Pilgrim (United States) Kelly Collins	Chevrolet LS7R 7.0 L V8	G	327
11	LMGTS	63	(United States) Corvette Racing	(United States) Chris Kneifel (Canada) Ron Fellows (United Kingdom) Justin Bell	Chevrolet Corvette C5-R	G	326
11	LMGTS	63	(United States) Corvette Racing	(United States) Chris Kneifel (Canada) Ron Fellows (United Kingdom) Justin Bell	Chevrolet LS7R 7.0 L V8	G	326
12	LMGTS	52	(France) Viper Team Oreca	(United States) Tommy Archer (Belgium) Marc Duez (Netherlands) Patrick Huisman	Chrysler Viper GTS-R	M	324
12	LMGTS	52	(France) Viper Team Oreca	(United States) Tommy Archer (Belgium) Marc Duez (Netherlands) Patrick Huisman	Chrysler 8.0 L V10	M	324
13	LMGTS	57	(Netherlands) Carsport Holland	(Netherlands) Mike Hezemans (Netherlands) David Hart (Netherlands) Hans Hugenholtz	Chrysler Viper GTS-R	M	317
13	LMGTS	57	(Netherlands) Carsport Holland	(Netherlands) Mike Hezemans (Netherlands) David Hart (Netherlands) Hans Hugenholtz	Chrysler 8.0 L V10	M	317
14	LMGTS	60	(Germany) Konrad Motorsport	(United States) Charles Slater (United States) Tommy Kendall (Germany) Jürgen von Gartzen	Porsche 911 GT2	D	317
14	LMGTS	60	(Germany) Konrad Motorsport	(United States) Charles Slater (United States) Tommy Kendall (Germany) Jürgen von Gartzen	Porsche 3.8 L Turbo Flat-6	D	317
15	LMP900	11	(United States) Panoz Motorsports	(Australia) David Brabham (Denmark) Jan Magnussen (United States) Mario Andretti	Panoz LMP-1 Roadster-S	M	315
15	LMP900	11	(United States) Panoz Motorsports	(Australia) David Brabham (Denmark) Jan Magnussen (United States) Mario Andretti	Élan 6L8 6.0 L V8	M	315
16	**LMGT**	**73**	**(Japan) Team Taisan Advan**	**(Japan) Hideo Fukuyama (Japan) Atsushi Yogo (Belgium) Bruno Lambert**	**Porsche 911 GT3-R**	Y	**310**
16	**LMGT**	**73**	**(Japan) Team Taisan Advan**	**(Japan) Hideo Fukuyama (Japan) Atsushi Yogo (Belgium) Bruno Lambert**	**Porsche 3.6 L Flat-6**	Y	**310**
17	LMGT	82	(Australia) Skea Racing International	(United Kingdom) Johnny Mowlem (United States) David Murry (Germany) Sascha Maassen	Porsche 911 GT3-R	P	304
17	LMGT	82	(Australia) Skea Racing International	(United Kingdom) Johnny Mowlem (United States) David Murry (Germany) Sascha Maassen	Porsche 3.6 L Flat-6	P	304
18	LMGT	76	(Germany) Seikel Motorsport	(Morocco) Max Cohen-Olivar (Belgium) Michel Neugarten (Canada) Anthony Burgess	Porsche 911 GT3-R	D	302
18	LMGT	76	(Germany) Seikel Motorsport	(Morocco) Max Cohen-Olivar (Belgium) Michel Neugarten (Canada) Anthony Burgess	Porsche 3.6 L Flat-6	D	302
19	LMP900	3	(France) DAMS	(France) Éric Bernard (France) Emmanuel Collard (France) Franck Montagny	Cadillac Northstar LMP	P	300
19	LMP900	3	(France) DAMS	(France) Éric Bernard (France) Emmanuel Collard (France) Franck Montagny	Cadillac Northstar 4.0 L Turbo V8	P	300
20	LMP900	6	(France) Mopar Team Oreca	(Belgium) Didier Theys (Belgium) Jeffrey van Hooydonk (France) Didier André	Reynard 2KQ-LM	M	292
20	LMP900	6	(France) Mopar Team Oreca	(Belgium) Didier Theys (Belgium) Jeffrey van Hooydonk (France) Didier André	Mopar 6.0 L V8	M	292
21	LMP900	1	(United States) Team Cadillac	(France) Franck Lagorce (United States) Butch Leitzinger (United Kingdom) Andy Wallace	Cadillac Northstar LMP	P	291
21	LMP900	1	(United States) Team Cadillac	(France) Franck Lagorce (United States) Butch Leitzinger (United Kingdom) Andy Wallace	Cadillac Northstar 4.0 L Turbo V8	P	291
22	LMP900	2	(United States) Team Cadillac	(South Africa) Wayne Taylor (Italy) Max Angelelli (Belgium) Eric van de Poele	Cadillac Northstar LMP	P	287
22	LMP900	2	(United States) Team Cadillac	(South Africa) Wayne Taylor (Italy) Max Angelelli (Belgium) Eric van de Poele	Cadillac Northstar 4.0 L Turbo V8	P	287
23	LMGT	79	(France) Perspective Racing	(France) Thierry Perrier (France) Jean-Louis Ricci (France) Romano Ricci	Porsche 911 GT3-R	P	286
23	LMGT	79	(France) Perspective Racing	(France) Thierry Perrier (France) Jean-Louis Ricci (France) Romano Ricci	Porsche 3.6 L Flat-6	P	286
24	LMGT	80	(Belgium) M1 Club-Renstal Excelsior	(Belgium) Philippe Verellen (Belgium) Rudi Penders (Belgium) Kurt Dujardyn	Porsche 911 GT3-R	P	285
24	LMGT	80	(Belgium) M1 Club-Renstal Excelsior	(Belgium) Philippe Verellen (Belgium) Rudi Penders (Belgium) Kurt Dujardyn	Porsche 3.6 L Flat-6	P	285
25	**LMP675**	**32**	**(Canada) Multimatic Motorsports**	**(Canada) Scott Maxwell (Canada) John Graham (Canada) Greg Wilkins**	**Lola B2K/40**	P	**274**
25	**LMP675**	**32**	**(Canada) Multimatic Motorsports**	**(Canada) Scott Maxwell (Canada) John Graham (Canada) Greg Wilkins**	**Nissan-AER VQL 3.0 L V6**	P	**274**
26	LMP675	36	(France) Rachel Welter	(France) Richard Balandras (Japan) Yojiro Terada (France) Sylvain Boulay	WR LMP	M	266
26	LMP675	36	(France) Rachel Welter	(France) Richard Balandras (Japan) Yojiro Terada (France) Sylvain Boulay	Peugeot 2.0 L Turbo I4	M	266
27	LMGT	75	(Germany) Manthey Racing	(United States) Michael Brockman (United States) Mike Lauer (United States) Gunnar Jeannette	Porsche 911 GT3-R	D	261
27	LMGT	75	(Germany) Manthey Racing	(United States) Michael Brockman (United States) Mike Lauer (United States) Gunnar Jeannette	Porsche 3.6 L Flat-6	D	261
NC	LMP900	10	(Denmark) Team Den Blå Avis	(Denmark) John Nielsen (Italy) Mauro Baldi (Germany) Klaus Graf	Panoz LMP-1 Roadster-S	P	205
NC	LMP900	10	(Denmark) Team Den Blå Avis	(Denmark) John Nielsen (Italy) Mauro Baldi (Germany) Klaus Graf	Élan 6L8 6.0 L V8	P	205
DNF	LMGTS	59	(Germany) Freisinger Motorsport	(Germany) Wolfgang Kaufmann (Japan) Yukihiro Hane (Japan) Katsunori Iketani	Porsche 911 GT2	D	313
DNF	LMGTS	59	(Germany) Freisinger Motorsport	(Germany) Wolfgang Kaufmann (Japan) Yukihiro Hane (Japan) Katsunori Iketani	Porsche 3.8 L Turbo Flat-6	D	313
DNF	LMGT	81	(Switzerland) Haberthur Racing	(Italy) Gabrio Rosa (France) Michel Ligonnet (Italy) Fabio Babini	Porsche 911 GT3-R	P	310
DNF	LMGT	81	(Switzerland) Haberthur Racing	(Italy) Gabrio Rosa (France) Michel Ligonnet (Italy) Fabio Babini	Porsche 3.6 L Flat-6	P	310
DNF	LMP900	17	(France) SMG Compétition	(France) Philippe Gache (South Africa) Gary Formato (France) Didier Cottaz	Courage C60	P	219
DNF	LMP900	17	(France) SMG Compétition	(France) Philippe Gache (South Africa) Gary Formato (France) Didier Cottaz	Judd GV4 4.0 L V10	P	219
DNF	LMGTS	56	(Japan) Team Goh	(Switzerland) Walter Brun (Switzerland) Toni Seiler (Germany) Christian Gläsel	Chrysler Viper GTS-R	M	210
DNF	LMGTS	56	(Japan) Team Goh	(Switzerland) Walter Brun (Switzerland) Toni Seiler (Germany) Christian Gläsel	Chrysler 8.0 L V10	M	210
DNF	LMGTS	54	(France) Paul Belmondo Racing	(France) Boris Derichebourg (France) Guy Martinolle (France) Jean-Claude Lagniez	Chrysler Viper GTS-R	D	180
DNF	LMGTS	54	(France) Paul Belmondo Racing	(France) Boris Derichebourg (France) Guy Martinolle (France) Jean-Claude Lagniez	Chrysler 8.0 L V10	D	180
DNF	LMP900	15	(Germany) Thomas Bscher Promotion	(Germany) Thomas Bscher (United Kingdom) Geoff Lees (France) Jean-Marc Gounon	BMW V12 LM	G	180
DNF	LMP900	15	(Germany) Thomas Bscher Promotion	(Germany) Thomas Bscher (United Kingdom) Geoff Lees (France) Jean-Marc Gounon	BMW S70 6.0 L V12	G	180
DNF	LMP675	35	(France) Gerard Welter	(France) Xavier Pompidou (France) Stéphane Daoudi (France) Jean-Bernard Bouvet	WR LMP	M	169
DNF	LMP675	35	(France) Gerard Welter	(France) Xavier Pompidou (France) Stéphane Daoudi (France) Jean-Bernard Bouvet	Peugeot 2.0 L Turbo I4	M	169
DNF	LMP900	21	(Italy) Team Rafanelli SRL	(Italy) Domenico Schiattarella (Belgium) Didier de Radiguès (Italy) Emanuele Naspetti	Lola B2K/10	M	154
DNF	LMP900	21	(Italy) Team Rafanelli SRL	(Italy) Domenico Schiattarella (Belgium) Didier de Radiguès (Italy) Emanuele Naspetti	Judd GV4 4.0 L V10	M	154
DNF	LMP900	24	(United States) Johansson-Matthews Racing	(Sweden) Stefan Johansson (United Kingdom) Guy Smith (United States) Jim Matthews	Reynard 2KQ-LM	Y	133
DNF	LMP900	24	(United States) Johansson-Matthews Racing	(Sweden) Stefan Johansson (United Kingdom) Guy Smith (United States) Jim Matthews	Judd GV4 4.0 L V10	Y	133
DNF	LMGT	72	(Spain) Racing Engineering	(Spain) Tomás Saldaña (Spain) Jesús Diez Villaroel (Italy) Giovanni Lavaggi	Porsche 911 GT3-R	D	78
DNF	LMGT	72	(Spain) Racing Engineering	(Spain) Tomás Saldaña (Spain) Jesús Diez Villaroel (Italy) Giovanni Lavaggi	Porsche 3.6 L Flat-6	D	78
DNF	LMP675	34	(France) ROC	(Spain) Jordi Gené (France) Jean-Christophe Boullion (France) Jérôme Policand	Reynard 2KQ-LM	M	72
DNF	LMP675	34	(France) ROC	(Spain) Jordi Gené (France) Jean-Christophe Boullion (France) Jérôme Policand	Volkswagen HPT16 2.0 L Turbo I4	M	72
DNF	LMP675	33	(France) ROC	(Germany) Ralf Kelleners (France) David Terrien (Switzerland) Jean-Denis Délétraz	Reynard 2KQ-LM	M	44
DNF	LMP675	33	(France) ROC	(Germany) Ralf Kelleners (France) David Terrien (Switzerland) Jean-Denis Délétraz	Volkswagen HPT16 2.0 Turbo I4	M	44
DNF	LMP900	20	(Germany) Konrad Motorsport	(Netherlands) Jan Lammers (Netherlands) Tom Coronel (Netherlands) Peter Kox	Lola B2K/10	D	38
DNF	LMP900	20	(Germany) Konrad Motorsport	(Netherlands) Jan Lammers (Netherlands) Tom Coronel (Netherlands) Peter Kox	Ford-Roush 6.0 L V8	D	38
DNF	LMGT	77	(France) Larbre Compétition	(France) Patrice Goueslard (France) Christophe Bouchut (France) Jean-Luc Chéreau	Porsche 911 GT3-R	M	34
DNF	LMGT	77	(France) Larbre Compétition	(France) Patrice Goueslard (France) Christophe Bouchut (France) Jean-Luc Chéreau	Porsche 3.6 L Flat-6	M	34
DNF	LMGT	78	(France) Jean-Luc Maury-Laribière	(France) Jean-Luc Maury-Laribière (France) Bernard Chauvin (Italy) Angelo Zadra	Porsche 911 GT3-R	D	32
DNF	LMGT	78	(France) Jean-Luc Maury-Laribière	(France) Jean-Luc Maury-Laribière (France) Bernard Chauvin (Italy) Angelo Zadra	Porsche 3.6 L Flat-6	D	32
DNF	LMP675	30	(France) Didier Bonnet	(France) Patrick Lemarié (France) Jean-Francois Yvon (France) Yann Goudy	Debora LMP2000	A	24
DNF	LMP675	30	(France) Didier Bonnet	(France) Patrick Lemarié (France) Jean-Francois Yvon (France) Yann Goudy	BMW 3.2 L I6	A	24
DNF	LMGT	71	(United States) Michael Colucci Racing	(United States) Shane Lewis (United States) Cort Wagner (United States) Bob Mazzuoccola	Porsche 911 GT3-R	M	22
DNF	LMGT	71	(United States) Michael Colucci Racing	(United States) Shane Lewis (United States) Cort Wagner (United States) Bob Mazzuoccola	Porsche 3.6 L Flat-6	M	22
DNF	LMP900	4	(France) DAMS	(Belgium) Marc Goossens (France) Christophe Tinseau (Denmark) Kristian Kolby	Cadillac Northstar LMP	P	4
DNF	LMP900	4	(France) DAMS	(Belgium) Marc Goossens (France) Christophe Tinseau (Denmark) Kristian Kolby	Cadillac Northstar 4.0 L Turbo V8	P	4
DNF	LMP900	5	(France) Mopar Team Oreca	(France) Yannick Dalmas (France) Nicolas Minassian (France) Jean-Philippe Belloc	Reynard 2KQ-LM	M	1
DNF	LMP900	5	(France) Mopar Team Oreca	(France) Yannick Dalmas (France) Nicolas Minassian (France) Jean-Philippe Belloc	Mopar 6.0 L V8	M	1
DSQ^{†}	LMGT	83	(United States) Dick Barbour Racing	(Germany) Dirk Müller (Germany) Lucas Luhr (France) Bob Wollek	Porsche 911 GT3-R	M	319
DSQ^{†}	LMGT	83	(United States) Dick Barbour Racing	(Germany) Dirk Müller (Germany) Lucas Luhr (France) Bob Wollek	Porsche 3.6 L Flat-6	M	319

† - #83 Dick Barbour Racing was disqualified for an illegally sized fuel tank in post-race inspection.

=== Statistics ===
- Pole Position — Allan McNish, #9 Audi Sport Team Joest - 3:36.124
- Fastest Lap — Allan McNish, #9 Audi Sport Team Joest - 3:37.359
- Distance - 5007.99 km
- Average Speed - 207.00 km/h
- Highest Trap Speed — Audi R8 - 337 km/h (race)
