= Bernard Santal =

Swiss racing driver (born 1960

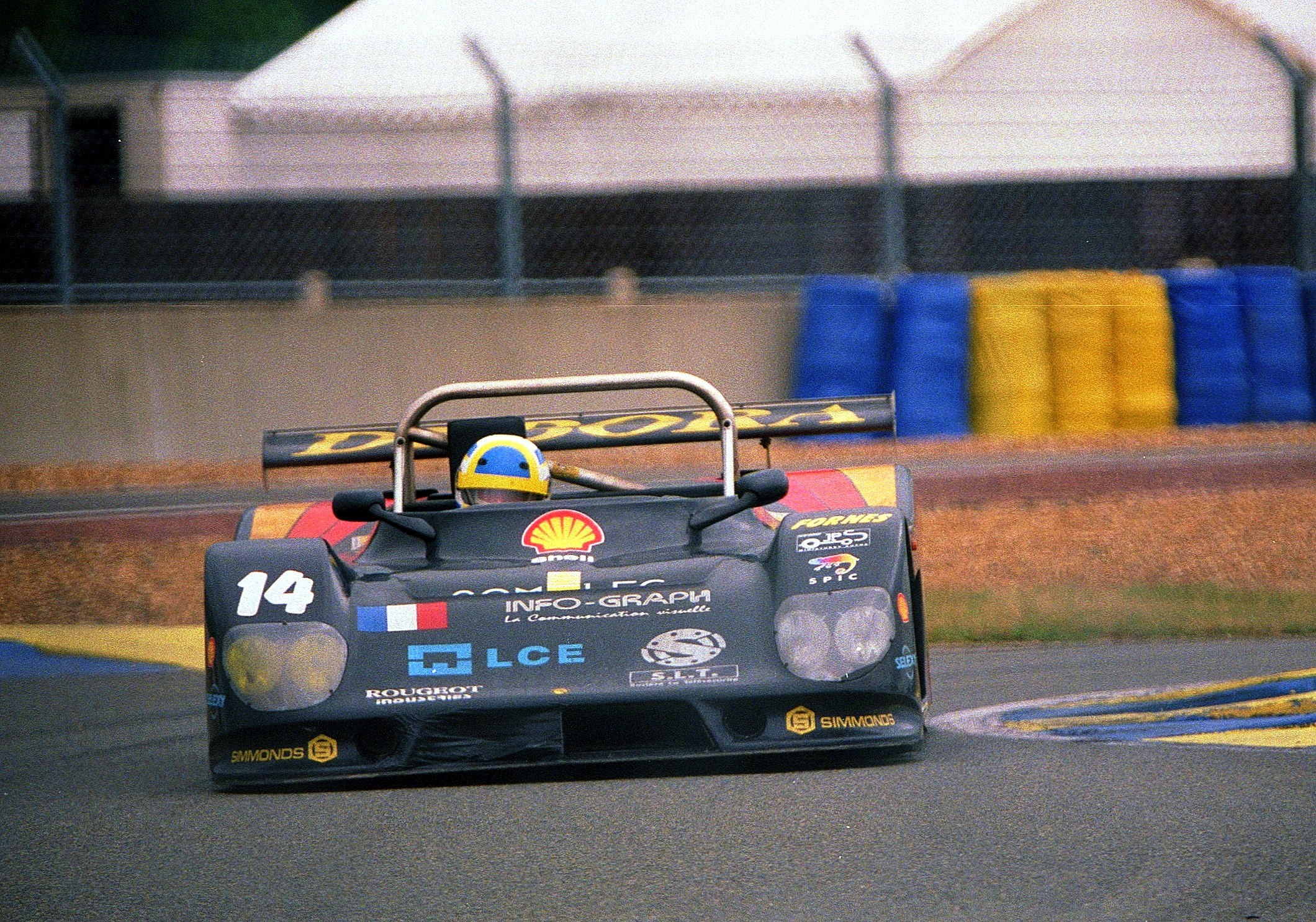

Bernard Santal (born 17 February 1960) is a Swiss former racing driver.

== Career ==
Born in Geneva five years after the Swiss federation had banned all motorsport activities within its borders in the wake of the 1955 Le Mans disaster, Santal initially worked as a cheesemaker. In 1982, he joined the Ecole Avia La Châtre team to compete in French Formula Three for eight of the thirteen rounds that season. His first race, at the wheel of a Toyota powered Ralt RT3 ended after spinning and stalling the car on lap nineteen, and he subsequently switched to the team's identically powered Martini MK34. Two points finished followed in Lédenon and Nogaro, before his gearbox blew up at Albi and an attempt to qualify for the Monaco F3 race was also in vain. He switched back to the Ralt, and immediately scored sixth place at Croix-En-Ternois before finishing fourth at the European F3 round in the team's home race in Chàtre. The following week he scored his first win in Formula Three at Paul Ricard, then at Albi's season finale his second podium to round out his first season in motorsport.

For 1983, Santal moved up to European Formula Three with Schwaller Motorsport, staying with the Ralt RT3. After failing to qualify at Vallelunga and failing to finish at Zolder, he scored twelfth at Magny-Cours before again failing to qualify for the Monaco F3 race. His next top ten came at Silverstone that doubled as a round of Britain's F3 championship where he finished eighth. His best finish of the year came at the Öesterriechring where he came second that began a string of four consecutive race finishes to end the season, the best of which was fourth at Nogaro.

In 1984, another European F3 campaign followed, again with a new team. This time it was with Coloni, just a few years before they graduated to F1. After seven races Coloni dropped Santal after consecutive accidents at Silverstone and Monaco, and went on to win that year's title with Ivan Capelli. Completing the year with five races between David Price Racing and Ecole Avia La Châtre saw a podium at Knutstorp while driving for the former in a Volkswagen powered Ralt. He also scored top five finishes at Nogaro and Jarama with the British outfit.

1984 saw Santal again without a full-season drive. Staying with Ecole Avia La Châtre, now known as Avia Sports he was just nine tenths off the podium at his first race of the year in Nogaro. Consecutive retirements at Magny-Cours and Ledenon however meant he was once again out of a drive and his next race was a year to the day of his Ledenon outing. Signing a deal to drive with French F3 veterans Jacky Carmigon Racing with their Dallara F386, but as with Avia the partnership lasted three races with 11th place at Magny-Cours his only finish for the team. A one-off drive for Horag-Hortz ended in a retirement, and he failed to qualify in his only International F3000 attempt with Jordan later that year.

Santal returned to racing in April the following year, although by now his single-seater career was over. 1987 saw Santal compete in touring cars for Dixi Sport's Alfa Romeo 75. Paired with Ferdinand De Lesseps, the pair were last of the running cars in Donington's season opener before placing tenth at the World Touring Car Championshp round at Jarama. Estoril saw them finish 16th in their last race as a duo. Santal's final outing for Dixi Sport came at Dijon, where he finished 28th with Frederic Delavallade. His final outing in the Alfa Romeo came as a one-off drive for Luigi Motorsport, and paired with Frederic Delavalle the pair finished 13th at Zolder.

In August, Santal also secured himself a drive in that year's 24 Hours of Spa with Euromotorsport. Driving a Ford Escort RS200 with Romain Feitler and Gaston Rahier, the trio retired after 240 laps.

1988 saw Santal continue his touring car career, switching to the Maserati Biturbo 331 of the Conquista team, though his pairing with Swede Thomas Lindstrom was largely fruitless. Two retirements in the opening rounds of that year's European championship at Dijon and Valellunga left Santal without a finished race until July of that year, where the pair finished fifteenth at the Nurburgring. Joined by Gaston Rahier once again for the Spa 24 Hours the trio never ran a single lap, owing to a driveshaft failure prior to the start. After this, the pair went their separate ways at the season finale in Nogaro, with Santal contesting the Silverstone round with Swiss privateers Bemani Motorernbau. Together with fellow Swiss driver Philippe Müller he drove the team's Toyota Supra to sixteenth.

In the midst of this, Santal had also found a seat in the World Sportscar Championship in a Sauber-Mercedes C8 for Noël del Bello's privateer team, virtually the only customer operation that existed for the car. Though Santal contested four races that season, he failed to finish any. On three occasions the 5-litre V8 Mercedes engine gave way, at Monza before the race had even begun. Paired up with del Bello himself and Jacques Guillot at Silverstone the trio's race ended on lap 69. Le Mans was a similar story, this time with Belgian Bernard De Dryver replacing Guillot, and del Bello staying to complete the trio. The car had been running swimmingly until half distance, when after thirteen hours and 157 laps the engine gave way again. Santal would contest only the Brands Hatch 1000km round after this, the fuel pump failing after 104 laps.

Santal began 1989 with his only outing in the French Touring Car Championship, where he reunited with Jacques Guillot, finishing fifth in their Mercedes 190E. Le Mans beckoned again, this time with the Courage works team. He was this year by Bernard De Dryver, along with Patrick Gonin in the team's Cougar C22/Porsche and lasted 14 hours before the electronics failed after 168 laps. He then made his IMSA debut for the works Spice Engineering squad, contesting two rounds with their Pontiac powered SE90 at San Antonio and Sear's Point (now known as Sonoma), a best finish of eighth coming in the former.

The results caught the attention of fellow Swiss driver turned team owner Walter Brun, who gave Santal his first full season drive in many a year. Between 1990 and 1991 Santal made eleven appearances for Brun Motorsport in the World Sportscar Championship in their Porsche 962C, and while they finished consistently the crew struggled to breach the top-ten. In fact Santal's first outing at Silverstone proved his best result with the team, scoring eighth in the 480km race with Massimo Sigala sharing driving duties. Tenth at that year's Le Mans was the only other truly notable result and his first Le Mans finish, with Harald Huysman and Sigala sharing the car. Other results included a fifteenth place finish at Donington in which Santal drove the entire race himself.

Santal would make three starts in 1991 for Brun Motorsport, the first of which saw both he and co-driver Oscar Laurrari disqualified for over-fuelling their car on the final pitstop at Suzuka, before that year's Le Mans ended with a broken headgasket after 10 hours and 138 laps, sharing with Huysman and Canadian Robbie Stirling. Partnered up with Brun regular Jesus Pareja, the pair lasted just 12 laps before the engine gave way in what proved the last outing for Brun Motorsport, who left the World Sportscar Championship at the end of 1991.

Following this, Santal contested Le Mans thrice more, once in 1993 with the Welter Racing Team that had previously set the all-time speed record on the Mulsanne straight at 405km/h (252mph) in 1988. Partnered with Patrick Gonin and Alain Lamouille the trio scored a class win in Category 3 after 268 laps in the works LM93, powered by the same engine that propelled Peugeot's 405 to Dakar Rally and Pikes Peak glory.

1994 saw Santal aboard a Debora-LMP294 with Pascal Dro and Georges Tessier, though their Alfa Romeo engine gave them considerable trouble and accident damage forced their retirement after just 79 laps and eleven hours. The following year was an improvement, as Santal returned with Didier Bonnet's team to take his second class win at Le Mans with Patrice Roussel and Eduard Sezionale, this time in category 2 with an evolved version of the 1994 Debora, albeit with Cosworth power.

Following that year's Le Mans, Santal retired from racing, making one exception with Stratton Racing for the 24 Hours of Spa support race in British GT in 2010, driving an Aston Martin Vantage DBSR9 to 50th with Angelos Metaxa.

== Racing Record ==
=== Complete International Formula 3000 results ===
(key) (Races in bold indicate pole position; races in italics indicate fastest lap.)

Year	Entrant	Chassis	Engine	1	2	3	4	5	6	7	8	9	10	11	Pos.	Pts
1986	Eddie Jordan Racing	March 86B	Ford Cosworth	SIL	VLL	PAU	SPA	IMO	MUG	PER	ÖST; Ret	BIR	BUG	JAR; DNQ	NC	0

=== Complete French Supertouring Championship Results ===
(key) (Races in bold indicate pole position; races in italics indicate fastest lap.)

Year	Entrant	Chassis	1	2	3	4	5	6	7	8	9	10	11	Pos.	Pts
1989	Bernard Santal	Mercedes 190E	NOG	LMS	PRC	MOC; 5	DIJ	LAC	ROU	CRO	ALB	LED	PAU	NC	0

=== Complete British Formula Three Series Results ===
(key) (Races in bold indicate pole position; races in italics indicate fastest lap.)

Year	Entrant	Chassis	Engine	1	2	3	4	5	6	7	8	9	10	11	12	13	14	15	16	17	18	19	20	Pos.	Pts
1983	Schwaller Motorsport	Ralt RT3	Toyota	SIL	THR	SIL	DON	THR	SIL	THR	BRH	SIL; 8	SIL	CAD	SNE	SIL	DON	OUL	SIL	OUL	THR	SIL	THR	NC	0

=== Complete European Formula Three Results ===
(key) (Races in bold indicate pole position; races in italics indicate fastest lap.)

Year	Entrant	Chassis	Engine	1	2	3	4	5	6	7	8	9	10	11	12	13	14	15	16	Pts	Pos
1982	Ecole Avia La Chàtre	Ralt RT3	Toyota	MUG	HOC	DON	ZOL	DON	MOC	OES	ZAN	SIL	MON	PER	CHA; 4	KNU	NOG; Ret	JAR	KAS	3	16th
