= 1995 24 Hours of Daytona =

Motor racing meeting

Previous: 1994	Next: 1996
Index: Races | Winners

Track map of Daytona International Speedway

The 1995 Rolex 24 at Daytona was a 24-hour endurance sports car race held on February 4–5, 1995 at the Daytona International Speedway road course. The race served as the opening round of the 1995 IMSA GT Championship.

Victory overall and in the LM WSC class went to the No. 10 Kremer Racing Kremer K8 driven by Giovanni Lavaggi, Jürgen Lässig, Marco Werner, and Christophe Bouchut. Victory in the WSC class went to the No. 2 Brix Racing Spice BDG-02 driven by Jeremy Dale, Jay Cochran, Fredrik Ekblom. Victory in the GTS-1 class went to the No. 70 Roush Racing Ford Mustang driven by Tommy Kendall, Paul Newman (at age 70), Mike Brockman, and Mark Martin. The GTS-2 class was won by the No. 54 Stadler Motorsport Porsche 911 Carrera RSR driven by Enzo Calderari, Lilian Bryner, Renato Mastropietro, and Ulli Richter.

== Race results ==
Class winners in bold.

Pos	Class	No	Team	Drivers	Car	Laps
1	**LM WSC**	**10**	**(Germany) Kremer Racing**	**(Italy) Giovanni Lavaggi (Germany) Jürgen Lässig (Germany) Marco Werner (France) Christophe Bouchut**	**Kremer K8**	**690**
2	**WSC**	**2**	**(United States) Brix Racing**	**(Canada) Jeremy Dale (United States) Jay Cochran (Sweden) Fredrik Ekblom**	**Spice BDG-02**	**685**
3	**GTS-1**	**70**	**(United States) Roush Racing**	**(United States) Tommy Kendall (United States) Paul Newman (United States) Mike Brockman (United States) Mark Martin**	**Ford Mustang**	**682**
4	GTS-1	01	(United States) Rohr Corp.	(United States) Hurley Haywood (United States) David Murry (Germany) Bernd Mayländer (United States) Jochen Rohr	Porsche 911 GT2	655
5	**GTS-2**	**54**	**(Switzerland) Stadler Motorsport**	**(Switzerland) Enzo Calderari (Switzerland) Lilian Bryner (Italy) Renato Mastropietro (Germany) Ulli Richter**	**Porsche 911 Carrera RSR**	**654**
6	GTS-2	93	Ecuador Mobil 1 Racing	(Ecuador) Jean-Pierre Michelet (Ecuador) Henry Taleb (New Zealand) Rob Wilson (United States) John Fergus	Nissan 240SX	653
7	GTS-2	55	(Costa Rica) Jorge Trejos	(United States) Dennis Aase (Costa Rica) Jorge Trejos (Costa Rica) Javier Quiros (United States) Martin Snow	Porsche 964 Carrera RSR	646
8	WSC	50	(United States) Euromotorsport Racing, Inc.	(Italy) Gianfranco Brancatelli (Italy) Massimo Sigala (United States) Elton Julian (Italy) Fabrizio Barbazza	Ferrari 333 SP	645
9	GTS-2	40	(Germany) Dören	(Germany) Karl-Christian Lück (Germany) Dieter Lindenbaum (Germany) Hermann Tilke (Germany) Edgar Dören	Porsche 911 Carrera RSR	645
10	GTS-1	96	(United States) Morrison Motorsports	(United States) John Heinricy (United States) Stu Hayner (United States) Andy Pilgrim (United States) Don Knowles	Chevrolet Corvette	643
11	GTS-2	02	(United States) Rohr Corp.	(Austria) Johannes Huber (United States) Lloyd Hawkins (Germany) Andreas Knapp-Voith (Austria) Niki Siokola	Porsche 964 Carrera RSR	640
12	WSC	63	(United States) Downing/Atlanta Racing	(United States) Jim Downing (United States) Butch Hamlet (United States) Jim Pace (United States) Tim McAdam	Kudzu DG-3 WSC	637
13	GTS-2	26	(United States) Alex Job Racing	(United States) Joe Cogbill (United States) Jack Lewis (United States) Monte Shelton (United States) Charles Slater	Porsche 911	633
14	GTS-2	82	(United States) Wendy's Race Team	(United States) Dick Greer (United States) Al Bacon (United States) Peter Uria (United States) Mike Mees (United States) Terry Lingner	Mazda RX-7	619
15	GTS-1	5	(United States) Brix Racing	(United States) Price Cobb (United States) Mark Dismore (United States) Darin Brassfield (United Kingdom) Calvin Fish	Oldsmobile Cutlass Supreme	613
16	GTS-1	65	(United States) Roush Racing	(Puerto Rico) Wally Castro (Puerto Rico) Rolando Falgueras (Puerto Rico) Manolo Villa (Puerto Rico) Biagio Parisi (Puerto Rico) Axel Rivera	Ford Mustang	607
17	GTS-1	53	(United States) Bill McDill	(United States) Bill McDill (United States) Tom Juckette (United States) Jim Trotnow (United States) Richard McDill	Chevrolet Camaro	602
18 DNF	GTS-2	85	(United States) Daytona Racing	(Germany) Wolfgang Land (Germany) Arnold Mattschull (Germany) Alexander Mattschull (United States) Bill Auberlen (United States) Ron Finger	Porsche 993 Carrera RSR	587
19	GTS-1	91	(Germany) Konrad Motorsport	(Germany) Bernd Netzeband (Netherlands) Bert Ploeg (Germany) Edgar Althoff (Brazil) Régis Schuch	Porsche 911 Turbo	582
20	GTS-2	25	(United States) Alex Job Racing	(United States) Gerry Jackson (United States) Bruce Barkelew (Italy) Angelo Cilli (United States) Anthony Lazzaro	Porsche 911	581
21	GTS-1	75	(United States) Cunningham Racing	(New Zealand) Steve Millen (United States) Johnny O'Connell (United States) John Morton	Nissan 300ZX Turbo	575
22	GTS-2	52	(United States) Andy Strasser	(United States) Andy Strasser (United States) Kevin Wheeler (United States) Jamie Busby (United States) Dennis DeFranceschi (United States) Alan Ludwig	Porsche 911 Carrera RSR	566
23	GTS-2	08	(United States) G&W Motorsports	(United States) Weldon Scrogham (United States) Steve Marshall (United States) John Biggs (United States) Danny Marshall	Porsche 911 Carrera RSR	564
24	GTS-2	09	(United States) Flis Brothers	(United States) Craig Conway (United States) Todd Flis (United States) Richard Nisbett (United States) Troy Flis	Mitsubishi Eclipse	562
25	GTS-1	69	(Germany) Gustl Spreng Racing	(Germany) Fritz Müller (United States) Ray Mummery (Germany) Gustl Spreng	Porsche 993 Carrera Turbo	553
26	GTS-2	24	(United States) Jarett Freeman	(United States) Jarett Freeman (United States) Simon Gregg (United States) Max Schmidt (United States) Nort Northam	Porsche 993 Cup	553
27	GTS-2	04	(United States) Rohr Corp.	(United States) Dick Downs (United States) Larry Schumacher (United States) Richard Raimist (Germany) Wolfgang Haugg	Porsche 911 SC	550
28	GTS-1	4	(United States) Brix Racing	(United States) R. K. Smith (United Kingdom) Calvin Fish (United States) Brian DeVries (United States) Irv Hoerr	Oldsmobile Cutlass Supreme	547
29 DNF	GTS-2	99	(Germany) Konrad Motorsport	(Germany) Karl-Heinz Wlazik (Canada) Ira Storfer (Germany) Helmut Reis (Austria) Franz Konrad	Porsche 911 Carrera RSR	524
30 DNF	WSC	43	(United States) Payne Williams Racing	(United States) Brian Williams (United States) John Mirro (United States) Lee Payne (United States) David Loring (United States) Don Kitch Jr.	Denali	512
31	GTS-1	95	(United States) Morrison Motorsports	(United States) Jim Minneker (United States) Charles Morgan (United States) Del Percilla (United States) Rob Morgan	Chevrolet Corvette	511
32	WSC	0	(United States) Chuck Cottrell	(United States) Chuck Cottrell (United States) Leigh Miller (United States) Mike Holt (United States) Chuck Goldsborough (Panama) Elias Chocron (United States) Ted Anderson (United States) Eric van Cleef (United States) Don Kitch Jr.	Kudzu DG-2 WSC	489
33	GTS-1	64	(United States) Mel A. Butt	(United States) Mel Butt (United States) Jim Higgs (United States) Bob Barker (United States) Ronald Zitza	Chevrolet Camaro	480
34	GTS-1	61	(United States) Callaway Competition	(Italy) Enrico Bertaggia (Belgium) Philippe Olczyk (Germany) Seppi Wendlinger (United States) Johnny Unser	Callaway Corvette	473
35	WSC	30	(Italy) Momo Corse	(Italy) Giampiero Moretti (South Africa) Wayne Taylor (Chile) Eliseo Salazar (Belgium) Didier Theys	Ferrari 333 SP	467
36	GTS-1	31	(United Kingdom) Kent Racing	(United Kingdom) Robert Nearn (United Kingdom) Nigel Smith (Chile) Juan Gac (United States) Kent Painter	Chevrolet Camaro	450
37	WSC	7	(United States) Bobby Brown Motorsports	(United States) Dominic Dobson (United States) Bill Cooper (United States) Don Bell (United States) Paul Debban	Spice HC94	447
38 DNF	LM WSC	00	(Germany) Konrad Motorsport	(Netherlands) Cor Euser (Brazil) Antônio Hermann (United Kingdom) Tiff Needell (Austria) Franz Konrad	Kremer K8	436
39 DNF	WSC	3	(United States) Scandia Racing Team	(Spain) Fermín Vélez (United States) Andy Evans (United States) Paul Gentilozzi (Belgium) Eric van de Poele	Ferrari 333 SP	417
40	WSC	51	(United States) Scott Flatt	(United States) Bruce Trenery (United States) Vic Rice (United Kingdom) Grahame Bryant (United States) Buddy Norton (United Kingdom) Jeffrey Pattinson	Cannibal	407
41 DNF	WSC	33	(United States) Scandia Racing Team	(Italy) Mauro Baldi (Italy) Michele Alboreto (Sweden) Stefan Johansson	Ferrari 333 SP	405
42	GTS-1	15	Team Argentina	(Argentina) Luis Delconte (Argentina) Alejandro Spinella (Argentina) Fabian Hermoso (Argentina) Facundo Gilbicella	Oldsmobile Cutlass Supreme	402
43	GTS-1	87	(United States) John Annis	(United States) John Annis (United States) Dom DeLuca (United States) David Donavon (United States) Tom Paligraf	Chevrolet Camaro	387
44	GTS-1	34	(United States) RFF Racing	(United States) Len McCue (United States) Gary Grubbs (United States) Greg Cecil (United States) Bob Hudgins (United States) Ray Halin	Chevrolet Camaro	376
45	GTS-2	57	(United States) Kryderacing	(United States) Reed Kryder (France) Christian Heinkélé (Germany) Klaus Roth (United States) Frank Del Vecchio	Nissan 240SX	373
46 DNF	GTS-1	17	(United States) Dave White	(United States) Arthur Pilla (United States) Kenper Miller (United States) Charles Mendez (United States) Dave White	Porsche 911 Turbo	368
47 DNF	GTS-2	88	(United States) Douglas Campbell	(United States) Ralph Thomas (United States) John Bourassa (United States) Douglas Campbell (United States) Amos Johnson	Mazda RX-7	335
48 DNF	GTS-1	92	(United States) Hoyt Overbagh	(United States) Oma Kimbrough (United States) Mark Montgomery (Italy) Mauro Casadei (United States) David Kicak (United States) Steve Golden (United States) Hoyt Overbagh	Chevrolet Camaro	317
49 DNF	GTS-1	90	(United States) Riggins Competition	(United States) Craig Carter (United States) Andy Petery (United States) Tommy Riggins (United States) Les Delano	Oldsmobile Cutlass Supreme	316
50 DNF	GTS-2	32	(United States) Comprent Motor Sports	(Chile) Juan Carlos Carbonell (United States) Michael Smellie (United States) John Finger (United States) Lambert McLaurin	Mazda MX-6	294
51 DNF	WSC	20	(United States) Warren Mosler	(United States) Chet Fillip (United States) Jeff McComb (United States) Brian Berry (United States) Mac DeMere (United States) Don Fuller	Consulier Intruder	291
52	WSC	37	(United States) Pegasus Racing	(Belgium) Éric Bachelart (United States) Michael Dow (Germany) Oliver Kuttner (United States) Rick Ferguson	Pegasus	290
53	GTS-1	21	(United Kingdom) Kent Racing	(France) Guy Kuster (Italy) Sergio Brambilla (Italy) Mauro Borella (United States) Kent Painter (United States) Scott Gaylord	Chevrolet Camaro	280
54 DNF	GTS-2	68	(United States) Hendricks Porsche	(United States) Joe Danaher (United States) Hugh Johnson (United States) Charles Coker (United States) Cort Wagner	Porsche 968 Turbo	259
55 DNF	GTS-1	97	(Canada) Vic Sifton	(United States) Robert Kahn (Canada) Victor Sifton (Canada) Trevor Seibert (United States) Joe Varde	Chevrolet Lumina	253
56 DNF	GTS-2	22	(United States) Fabcar	(United States) Tom Hessert Jr. (United States) Steve Durst (United States) John Higgins (United States) Mark Abel	Porsche 911	246
57 DNF	GTS-1	77	(United States) Tim Banks	(United States) Don Arpin (United States) Tim Banks (United States) Paul Reckert (United States) John Bumb	Oldsmobile Cutlass Supreme	237
58 DNF	GTS-2	12	(United States) Prototype Technology Group, Inc.	(Austria) Dieter Quester (United States) John Paul Jr. (United States) Pete Halsmer (United States) David Donohue	BMW M3 E36	221
59 DNF	GTS-2	86	(United States) Daytona Racing	(United States) Mark Mehalic (United States) Ron Finger (Germany) Martin Dose	Porsche 993 Carrera RSR	207
60 DNF	WSC	8	(United States) Support Net Racing, Inc.	(United States) Henry Camferdam (South Africa) Ben Morgenrood (United States) Roger Mandeville	Hawk MD3R	160
61 DNF	GTS-1	74	(United States) Champion Porsche	(Germany) Hans-Joachim Stuck (Canada) Bill Adam (Germany) Harald Grohs (Peru) Neto Jochamowitz (United States) Dorsey Schroeder	Porsche 911 GT2	159
62 DNF	WSC	44	(United States) Screaming Eagles Racing	(United States) Craig T. Nelson (Canada) Ross Bentley (United States) Dan Clark (United States) Margie Smith-Haas	Spice SE90	156
63 DNF	GTS-1	62	(United States) Curren Motorsports	(United States) Mark Kennedy (United States) Billy Bies (United States) David Rankin (United States) Tom Curren	Oldsmobile Cutlass Supreme	132
64 DNF	WSC	9	(United States) Auto Toy Store, Inc.	(United Kingdom) Andy Wallace (Netherlands) Jan Lammers (United Kingdom) Derek Bell	Spice SE90	100
65 DNF	WSC	6	(United States) Power Macintosh Racing	(United States) Dan Marvin (Sweden) Stanley Dickens (United States) Jeff Gray (United States) Rick Sutherland	Spice AK93	92
66 DNF	GTS-2	18	(United States) Dan Lewis	(United States) Tommy Johnson (United Kingdom) John Sheldon (United States) Dan Lewis (United States) Rick Fairbanks	Mazda MX-6	91
67 DNF	GTS-1	23	(United States) Bob Hundredmark	(United States) Bob Hundredmark (United States) Ken Fengler (United States) Steve Pfeffer (United States) Gene Henry	Oldsmobile Cutlass Supreme	78
68 DNF	GTS-2	58	(United States) Pro-Technik Racing	(United States) Mike Smith (Canada) Doug Frazier (United States) Jim Matthews (United States) Sam Shalala	Porsche 993 Carrera	65
69 DNF	GTS-2	13	(United States) Prototype Technology Group, Inc.	(United States) Boris Said (United Kingdom) Justin Bell (Germany) Ronny Meixner	BMW M3 E36	60
70 DNF	GTS-1	11	(United States) John Josey	(United States) Ken Bupp (United States) Scott Watkins (United States) Luis Sereix (United States) Danuel Urrutia	Ford Mustang	49
71 DNF	GTS-1	66	(United States) Team Gunnar	(United States) Chapman Root (United Kingdom) Jonathan Baker (United States) Cort Wagner (El Salvador) Carlos Moran	Porsche 911 Carrera RSR	24
72 DNF	GTS-1	38	(United States) Earl Segredahl	(United States) Tony Ave (United States) Ray Irwin (United States) Doug Nies (United States) Earl Segredahl	Chevrolet Camaro	17
73 DNF	WSC	16	(United States) Dyson Racing	(United Kingdom) James Weaver (United States) Rob Dyson (United States) Scott Sharp (United States) Butch Leitzinger	Riley & Scott Mk III	11
74 DNF	GTS-1	72	(United States) Champion Porsche	(Peru) Neto Jochamowitz (United States) Mike Peters (United States) Jeff Purner (Italy) Marco Apicella	Porsche 964 Turbo	0
