= Debora LMP2000 =

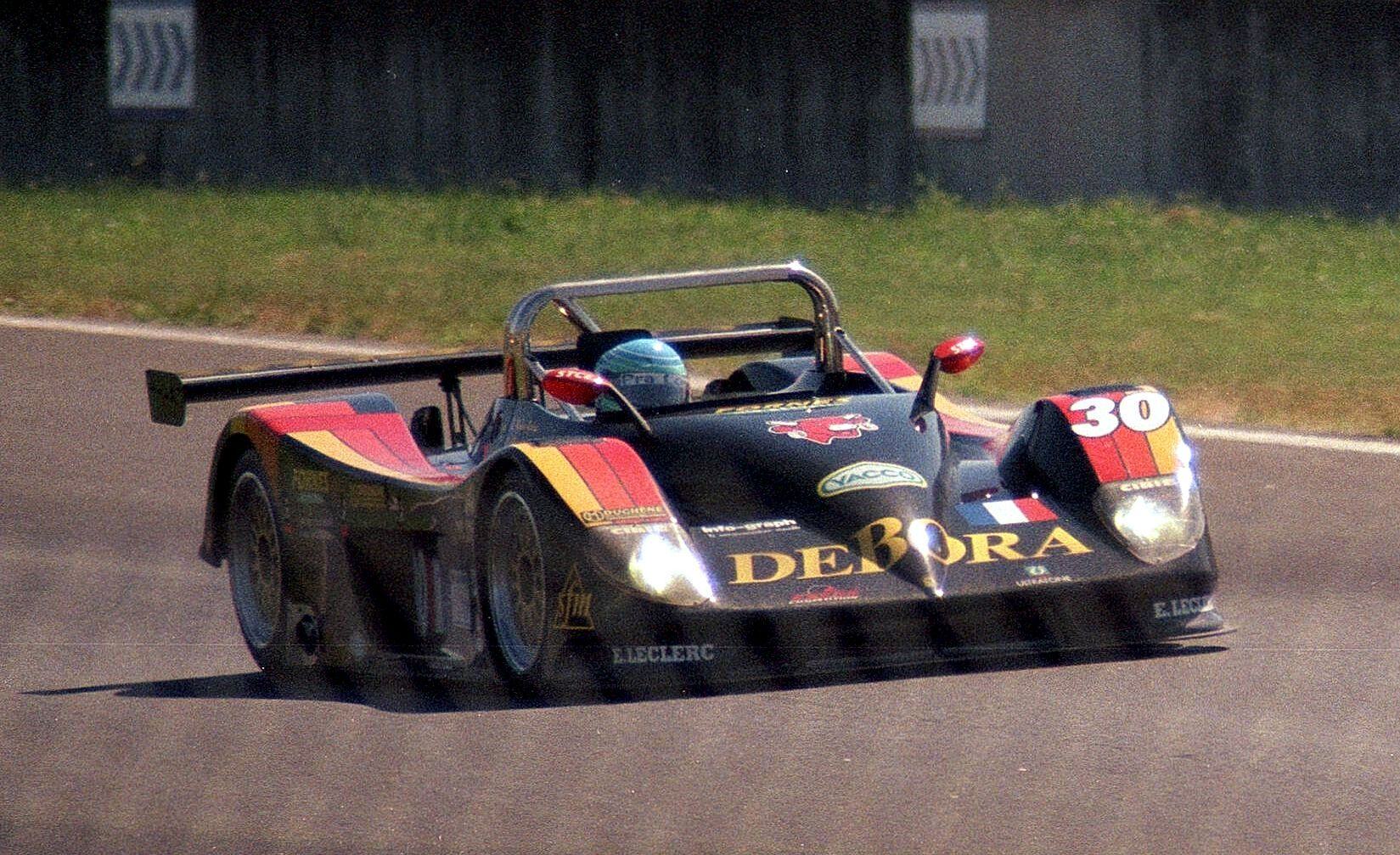
- The No. 30 LMP2000 of Didier Bonnet during the 2000 24 Hours of Le Mans
- Constructor: Debora
- Predecessor: Debora LMP297
- Successor: Debora LMP200

Technical specifications
- Engine: BMW 3,000–3,200 cc (183.1–195.3 cu in) naturally-aspirated I6 mid-engined
- Tyres: Avon

Competition history
- Notable entrants: Didier Bonnet Racing
- Notable drivers: (France) Patrick Lemarié (France) Jean-Francois Yvon (France) Yann Goudy
- Debut: 2000 24 Hours of Le Mans
Races	Wins
4 (5 entries)	0

The Debora LMP2000 was a Le Mans Prototype, built by Debora in 2000 for use in the 24 Hours of Le Mans and the Sports Racing World Cup. The car was initially fitted with a 3.2-litre BMW straight-six engine, but had a 3-litre BMW straight-six fitted for the Sports Racing World Cup. One chassis is known to have been built.

== Racing history ==
The Debora LMP2000 was initially entered in the test session for the 24 Hours of Le Mans in 2000 by Didier Bonnet Racing, but did not actually run in the session. Didier Bonnet Racing selected Patrick Lemarié, Yann Goudy and Jean-François Yvon to drive in the 24 Hours of Le Mans race, with the car competing in the LMP675 class, and fitted with a 3.2-litre BMW/Mader straight-six engine. However, after just under two hours, and having completed 24 laps, the team were forced to retire, as the engine had developed an oil leak. Debora and Didier Bonnet Racing lodged a joint-entry for the Brno round of the Sports Racing World Cup (SRWC), but did not actually compete. Didier Bonnet Racing entered Yvon and David Dussau in the following round of the SRWC, held at Donington Park, having fitted a 3-litre BMW straight-six engine in the car; the team finished in eighth overall, and third in the SRL class. Pascal Fabre replaced Dussau for the Nürburgring round, and the team finished 16th overall, and fifth in the SRL class. Goudy partnered Fabre for the penultimate round of the season, held at Magny-Cours; a gearbox failure after 36 minutes, and 21 laps, forced the team to retire. The team did not enter the final round of the season, held at Kyalami; and the car was not used again. Didier Bonnet Racing finished the Sports Racing World Cup season classified joint-tenth in the SRL category, with 20 points; level with Sports Racing Team Sweden and Scuderia Giudici.
