= Yann Goudy =

French racing driver

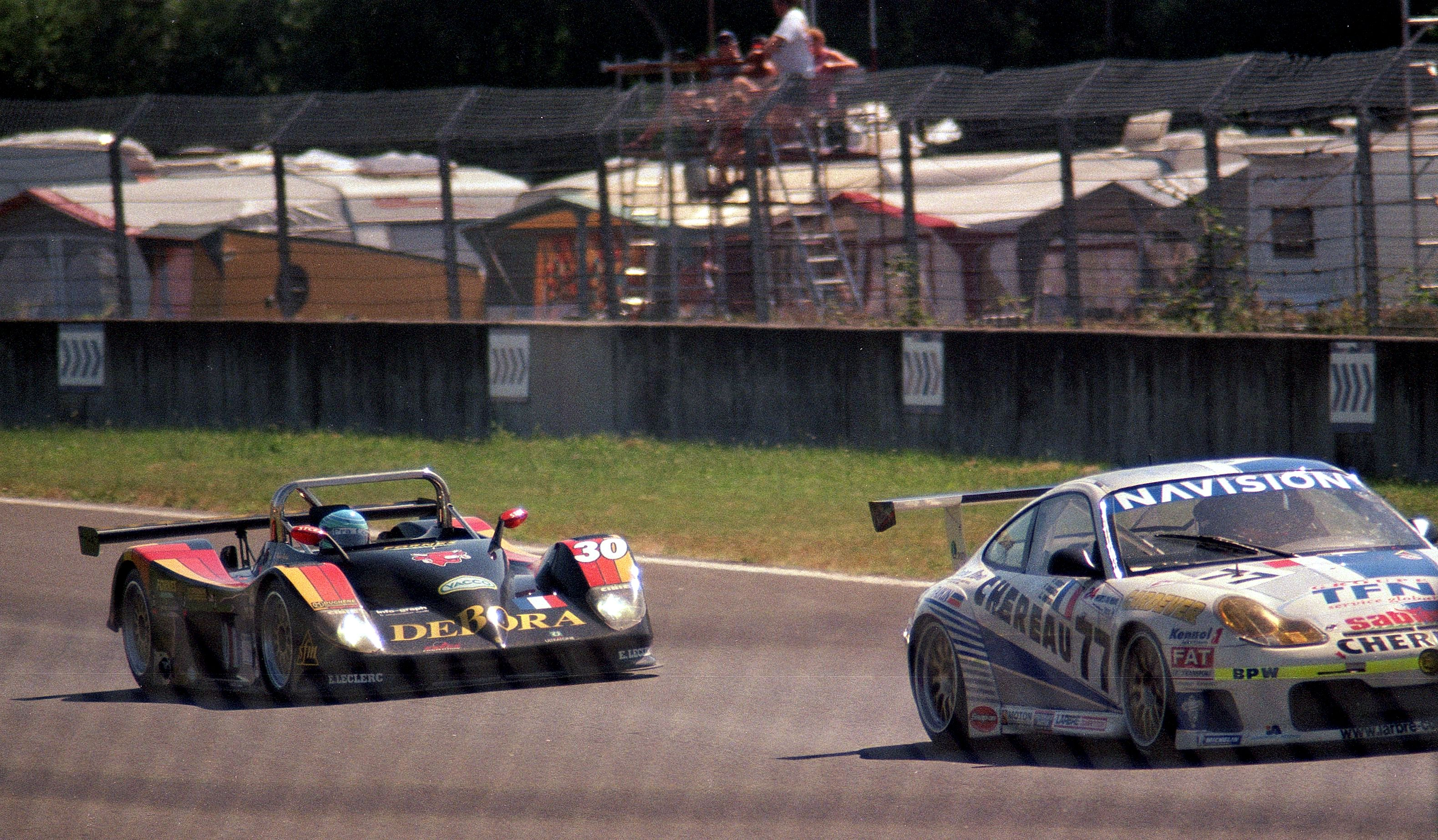
- Born: 7 November 1975 (age 50)
- Occupation: racing driver

Yann Goudy (born 7 November 1975) is a French racing driver.

Goudy raced just once in the International Formula 3000 series. After a hiatus away from racing, he now races in the European Le Mans Series.

== Racing history ==
=== Career summary ===
Season	Series	Team	Races	Wins	Poles	F.Laps	Podiums	Points	Position
1995	French Formula Three Championship - Class B	Exess Compétition	7	1	0	0	2	56	5th
1996	French Formula Three Championship - Class B	Exess Compétition	13	0	0	0	2	72	6th
1998	French Formula Three Championship	LD Autosport	?	0	0	0	0	1	15th
1998	French Formula Three Championship - Class B	LD Autosport	17	1	1	0	6	125	3rd
1998	French Formula Three Championship	LD Autosport	20	0	0	0	0	10	15th
1998	French Formula Three Championship - Class B	LD Autosport	11	8	10	0	9	252	1st
1999	French Formula Three Championship	LD Autosport	11	0	0	0	0	56	12th
2000	Italian Formula 3000	Monaco Motorsport Junior Team	8	0	0	0	0	0	NC
2000	24 Hours of Le Mans - LMP675	Didier Bonnet Racing	1	0	0	0	0	0	NC
2001	FIA International Formula 3000	Kid Jensen Racing	1	0	0	0	0	0	NC
2002	FFSA GT Championship	GTEC Sport	1	0	0	0	0	0	NC
2013	Blancpain Endurance Series - Pro-Am	ART Grand Prix	3	0	0	0	0	13	26th
2014	European Le Mans Series - GTC	ART Grand Prix	5	0	0	0	1	45	5th

== 24 Hours of Le Mans results ==
Year	Team	Co-Drivers	Car	Class	Laps	Pos.	Class Pos.
2000	(France) Didier Bonnet Racing	(France) Patrick Lemarié (France) Jean-François Yvon	Debora LMP2000-BMW	LMP675	24	DNF	DNF
