= Debora LMP295 =

Debora LMP295 Debora LMP201
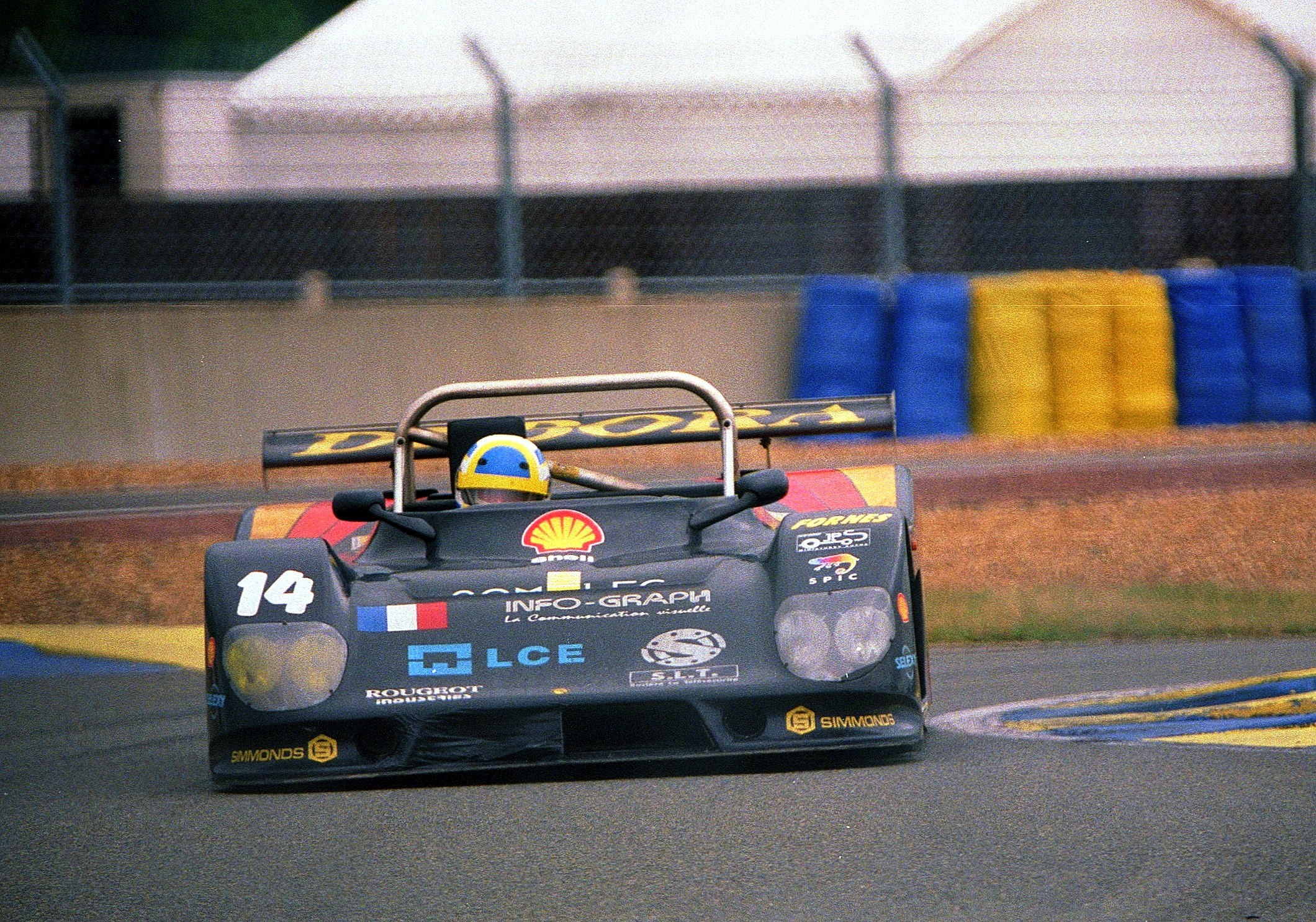
- Category: LMP2
- Constructor: Debora
- Predecessor: Debora LMP294
- Successor: Debora LMP296

Technical specifications
- Engine: Cosworth-Ford 1,996 cc (121.8 cu in) I4 turbocharged mid-engined
- Tyres: Michelin

Competition history
- Notable entrants: Didier Bonnet Racing
- Notable drivers: LMP295: Patrice Roussel/Edouard Sezionale/Bernard Santal; LMP201: Bernard Santal/Didier Bonnet
- Debut: 1995 24 Hours of Le Mans
Races	Wins
LMP295: 1 LMP201: 0 (1 entry)	LMP295: 1 (LMP2 class); LMP201: 0
- Teams' Championships: 1: (1995 24 Hours of Le Mans, LMP2 category)
- Constructors' Championships: 1: (1995 24 Hours of Le Mans, LMP2 category)
- Drivers' Championships: 1: (1995 24 Hours of Le Mans, LMP2 category)

The Debora LMP295 and Debora LMP201 were Le Mans Prototypes built by Debora in 1995 for the 24 Hours of Le Mans. One of each type was built, and both cars featured the same 2-litre Cosworth-Ford turbocharged straight-four engine. Both cars were only entered in the 1995 24 Hours of Le Mans, whilst the LMP295 took Didier Bonnet Racing's best ever result in the race.

== Racing history ==
Debora built two separate cars for the 1995 24 Hours of Le Mans; the LMP295, and the LMP201. Both cars used the same 2-litre Cosworth-Ford turbocharged straight-four engine, and both were run by Didier Bonnet Racing. The LMP295 chassis was designated #LMP295-01, whilst the LMP201 chassis was designated as the #LMP295-02. Both cars made their public debut in the Pre-qualifying session for the 24 Hours of Le Mans; the LMP201 was driven by Didier Bonnet and Bernard Santal, and was prequalified in 26th place, whilst the LMP295 was tested, but not used to pre-qualify with. However, the LMP201 was not listed as having pre-qualified, so Didier Bonnet Racing used the LMP295 instead, and entered Santal, Patrice Roussel and Edouard Sezionale in the car; they finished twentieth, and last, having completed 223 laps, but were the only LMP2 car to finish the race, and won the LMP2 class as a result. This would be Didier Bonnet Racing's best ever finish at the event. Neither the LMP201, nor the LMP295 were used again, as Debora built the new LMP296 for 1996.
