= Debora SP92 =

1992 Le Mans Prototype by Debora

- Category: Category 4
- Constructor: Debora
- Predecessor: None
- Successor: Debora SP93

Technical specifications
- Engine: Alfa Romeo 3,000 cc (183.1 cu in) V6 naturally aspirated mid-engined
- Tyres: Pirelli

Competition history
- Notable entrants: Didier Bonnet Racing
- Notable drivers: Didier Bonnet; Gérard Tremblay; Jacques Heuclin
- Debut: 1992 24 Hours of Le Mans
Races	Wins	Poles	F/Laps
1	0	0	0
- Teams' Championships: 0
- Constructors' Championships: 0
- Drivers' Championships: 0

The Debora SP92 was a Le Mans Prototype built by Debora in 1992 for the 24 Hours of Le Mans. Didier Bonnet Racing ran the car, which was fitted with a 3-litre Alfa Romeo V6 engine, in the race. Only one was built, and it was not used again after the 1992 24 Hours of Le Mans, being replaced by the Debora SP93.

== Racing history ==
The Debora SP92 was entered in the Category 4 class of the 1992 24 Hours of Le Mans by Didier Bonnet Racing. Didier Bonnet, Gérard Tremblay and Jacques Heuclin were selected to drive the car, which was fitted with a 3-litre Alfa Romeo V6 engine. The car was qualified in 29th place, but lasted just 25 laps of the race, before clutch failure forced the team out of the race. The car was not used again, as it was replaced by the Debora SP93 for the following season.
