= Debora SP93 =

Debora SP93 Debora LMP294
- Category: SP93: LMP; LMP294: LMP2
- Constructor: Debora
- Predecessor: Debora SP92
- Successor: Debora LMP295

Technical specifications
- Engine: Alfa Romeo 3,000 cc (183.1 cu in) V6 naturally aspirated mid-engined
- Tyres: Pirelli

Competition history
- Notable entrants: Didier Bonnet Racing; R.D.C. Schweiz
- Notable drivers: SP93: Yvan Muller/Georges Tessier/Gérard Tremblay/Didier Bonnet; LMP294: Bruno Miot/Georges Tessier/Pascal Dro/Bernard Santal/Josef Pfyl
- Debut: SP93: 1993 24 Hours of Le Mans; LMP294: 1994 24 Hours of Le Mans
Races	Wins
SP93: 2 LMP294: 1	SP93: 0 LMP294: 0

The Debora SP93 was a C3 class sports-prototype built by Debora for hillclimbing and for the French Coupe Alfa Romeo. It was updated to the Debora LMP294 in 1994 for the same event. Both cars were fitted with a 3-litre Alfa Romeo V6 engine, and both were run at the 24 Hours of Le Mans by Didier Bonnet Racing. Only two chassis, #C393-01 for Le Mans and #C393-02 for the "Coupe Alfa Romeo", were built, and were used for both the SP93 and the LMP294.

== Racing history ==
The SP93 first appeared in the test session for the 1993 24 Hours of Le Mans, with Yvan Muller, Georges Tessier, Gérard Tremblay and Didier Bonnet listed to drive the car. Didier Bonnet Racing entered it, with the car being fitted with a 3-litre Alfa Romeo V6 engine and competing in the LMP class. The car set a time fast enough for 18th, and was the only LMP-class car to attend the event. Muller, Tremblay and Tessier drove the car in the race, but retired after 253 laps due to engine failure; however, they completed more laps than three of the finishers. For 1994, the car was updated into the LMP294, and Bruno Miot was selected to drive it in the 1994 24 Hours of Le Mans test session; he set a time good enough for 19th overall, and second in the LMP2 category. For the race, Georges Tessier, Pascal Dro and Bernard Santal were selected to drive the car; this time, an accident forced the team to retire after 79 laps. The car was not raced again for four years, until R.D.C. Schweiz entered Josef Pfyl in the Most round of the Interserie in 1998; the car had been reverted to the SP93 specification, and was classified in the Div.II-Euroserie category. Pfyl was able to finish 15th overall in the first heat, and eleventh in class; this was not fast enough for him to compete in the second heat, and the chassis was never used again.
