= European Formula Three =

European Formula Three can refer to:

- The FIA European Formula 3 Championship (1975–1984)
- The FIA European Formula Three Cup, a one-off race (1985–1990, 1999–2004)
- The Formula 3 Euro Series (2003–2012)
- The FIA European Formula Three Championship (2012–2018)
