= Debora LMP200 =

- Constructor: Debora
- Predecessor: Debora LMP299 and Debora LMP2000

Technical specifications
- Engine: BMW 3,000–3,200 cc (183.1–195.3 cu in) naturally-aspirated I6; Mader-BMW 3,393 cc (207.1 cu in) naturally-aspirated I6 mid-engined
- Tyres: Avon

Competition history
- Notable entrants: Didier Bonnet Racing; Debora Automotive
- Debut: 2001 1000km of Estoril
Races	Wins
7 (10 entries)	2 (LMP675 class)
- Teams' Championships: 1: (2001 ELMS, LMP675 category)

The Debora LMP200 was a Le Mans Prototype, built by Debora in 2001 for use in the European Le Mans Series. Initially fitted with a 3.2-litre BMW straight-six engine, it was refitted with a 3-litre BMW straight-six in 2002, and then a 3.4-litre Mader-BMW straight-six in 2003. One car is known to have been built. The LMP200 was used by Didier Bonnet Racing when they won the European Le Mans Series in 2001.

== Racing history ==
=== 2001 ===
The Debora LMP200 was first entered in the 24 Hours of Le Mans in 2001 by Didier Bonnet Racing, but the team's entry was not accepted. Instead, the team debuted the car at the Estoril 1000 Kilometres, which formed part of the European Le Mans Series; the car was fitted with a 3.2-litre BMW straight-six engine, and David Dussau, Guillaume Gomez and Xavier Bich were selected to drive. However, after one-and-three-quarter hours, and 57 laps, the car lost a wheel and was forced to retire. At 2 Hours 45 Minutes Most, the car (driven by Dussau and Gomez) was classified in 13th overall, and second in the LMP675 class; but had retired after an hour and fifty minutes, and 48 laps, due to overheating caused by a water leak. The LMP200's final appearance in 2001 came at the 2 Hours 45 Minutes Vallelunga, where it finished for the first time; the car, driven by Bich and François Jakubowski, finished twelfth overall, and won the LMP675 class. Didier Bonnet Racing won the LMP675 category of the European Le Mans Series, with 77 points; 5 more than nearest rival Dick Barbour Racing.

=== 2002 ===
In 2002, Didier Bonnet Racing once again attempted to enter the LMP200 in the 24 Hours of Le Mans; however, their entry was again rejected. The car was next entered by Debora Automobiles in the Magny-Cours round of the FIA Sportscar Championship; however, the LMP200, driven by Gilles Duqueine, Jean-François Yvon and Michel Maisonneuve and refitted with a 3-litre BMW straight-six engine for the SR2 category, retired due to electrical failure after one hour, having completed 47 laps. The factory entered the car in the following round, held at Dijon-Prenois; Duqueine, Dominique Lacaud and Didier Miquée finished eighth overall, and fifth in class. The car made its final appearance in 2002 at the Spa-Francorchamps round of the FIA Sportscar Championship, with Debora entering Bich and Roland Bossy; the team were running ninth overall, and fourth in class, when the race was halted around the two-hour mark due to heavy rain. Debora were classified fourth in the SR2 Manufacturer's Championship with 24 points, 24 behind Lola, and 14 ahead of Rapier 6.

=== 2003 ===
In 2003, Didier Bonnet Racing tried for a third time to enter the LMP200 at the 24 Hours of Le Mans; once again, their entry was declined. Instead, the car made its first appearance of 2003 in the 1000 km of Le Mans; Didier Bonnet Racing entered Bossy and Renaud Derlot in the event, with a 3.4-litre Mader-BMW straight-six being fitted for the event. However, exhaust problems forced the team to retire after five-and-a-quarter hours, having completed 141 laps. This proved to be the car's last ever race, as it was not entered again.
