= Giovanni Lavaggi =

Italian racing driver (born 1958)

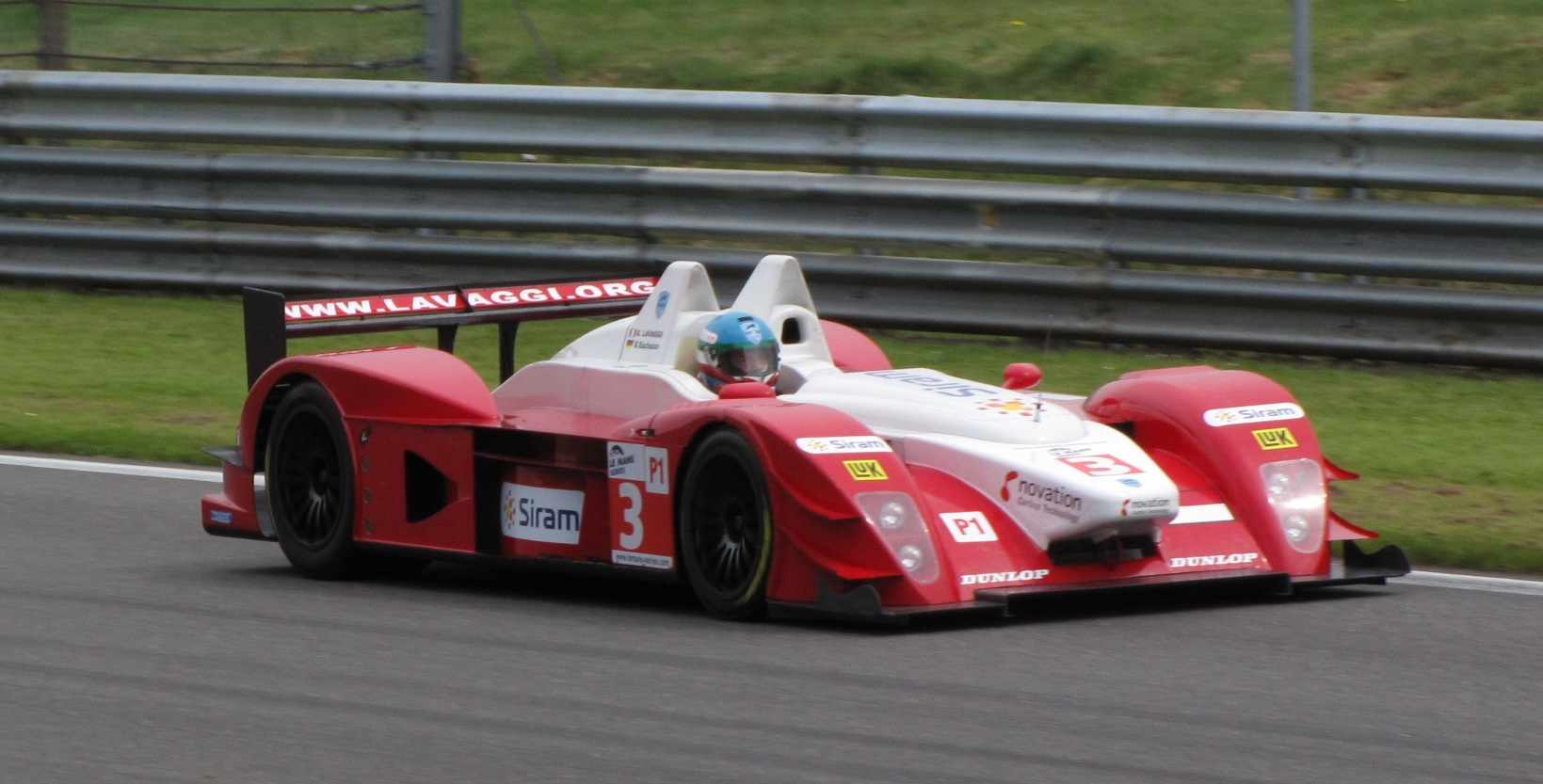
- Lavaggi driving his Lavaggi LS1 at Spa in 2009
- Born: 18 February 1958 (age 68); Augusta, Italy

Formula One World Championship career
- Nationality: (Italy) Italian
- Active years: 1995–1996
- Team(s): Pacific, Minardi
- Entries: 10 (7 starts)
- Championships: 0
- Wins: 0
- Podiums: 0
- Career points: 0
- Pole positions: 0
- Fastest laps: 0
- First entry: 1995 German Grand Prix
- Last entry: 1996 Japanese Grand Prix

Championship titles
- 1995 1993: 24 Hours of Daytona; Interserie

Giovanni Lavaggi (born 18 February 1958) is an Italian former racing driver.

Despite Lavaggi being a nobleman by background, he could not count on personal financial resources; therefore he started racing only at the age of 26. Nevertheless, he managed to reach the top class of motorsport, racing in Formula One in 1995 and 1996. His first involvement in F1 was in 1992 when, being a mechanical engineer, he was official test driver for the March F1 team. In 1995, he drove for Lotus-Pacific for four races in which he was forced to retire due to gearbox problems. In the second part of 1996 racing season, he joined the Minardi team for six races. His best result was a tenth place at the Hungaroring, which was the second best result of the year for Minardi team.

Lavaggi lives in Monte Carlo.

== Early life ==
Lavaggi was born in Augusta, Sicily on 18 February 1958, being of noble heritage. He studied mechanical engineering at Milan Polytechnic.

== Racing career ==
Lavaggi's racing career started in 1984, inspired by Henry Morrogh who judged him the best student he ever had at his racing school. That year he was official driver of the constructor Ermolli in the Italian Formula Panda championship where he was classified second, winning more races than any other driver. Not having enough sponsorship to afford a whole season in Formula Three, he did a few races in the Italian Formula Three Championship before turning to Group C sports cars, in order to gain international experience. In this category, he soon became a driver for the Porsche Kremer Team, for whom he became the 1993 Interserie champion, winning six of the season's total of 12 races and taking four further podium finishes. He also won the 1995 Daytona 24 Hours, driving nine hours in a team of four drivers. He scored two more wins in the FIA Sportscar Championship, including the 1000 km of Monza, where he drove five of the race's six hours and took five more podium places and two pole positions.

Lavaggi's first race in F1 was at the German Grand Prix for Pacific in 1995. Prior to this, he was a test driver for March during the 1992 season. He tested the Pacific PR02 twice before his first race for the British team - once at Silverstone and once at Snetterton. He was a rookie, but, at the same time, being 35 years old, he was the oldest driver in the field; therefore, he had to fight against the scepticism of the F1 media. The Pacific PR02 was an unreliable machine and he retired from all 4 races in 1995. His last experience in F1 was the 1996 Bologna Motorshow. Racing in a Minardi against two Benettons (driven by Jarno Trulli and Giancarlo Fisichella), two Ligiers (Olivier Panis and Shinji Nakano) and the other Minardi (Tarso Marques), he finished second, losing the final against Fisichella by a nose.

After his F1 career, Lavaggi drove in several endurance racing championships. In 2001, he competed in the FIA Sportscar Championship, winning a race at Monza after benefiting from multiple reliability issues for cars ahead. He raced in the series again in 2003. After entering several races of the Le Mans Endurance Series in 2004 and 2005, Lavaggi founded his own team "Scuderia Lavaggi" ahead of the 2006 Le Mans Series season. With that, he also became a race car constructor, designing and building his own Le Mans Prototype, the Lavaggi LS1. He raced the car in the Le Mans Series until 2009.

Lavaggi was nicknamed "Johnny Carwash" (an approximate translation of his name from Italian to English, John Washes) by people in the paddock; US talk show host David Letterman helped bring the nickname to popular attention.

== Family ==
The Lavaggi noble family moved from Genoa to Sicily (Palermo) in 1420 and then from Palermo to Augusta in 1711. A cousin of Giovanni’s grandfather, also called Giovanni Lavaggi, was a war hero. He was a pilot of the Italian Air Force and he died because of the sabotage of his airplane, while bringing to Asmara the Italian minister of public works Luigi Razza, who also was killed in the crash. In the cities of Catania and Augusta, Via Giovanni Lavaggi (Giovanni Lavaggi Road) is named after him.

== Racing record ==
=== Complete 24 Hours of Le Mans results ===
Year	Team	Co-Drivers	Car	Class	Laps	Pos.	Class Pos.
1989	(Germany) Porsche Kremer Racing	(Japan) Kunimitsu Takahashi (Italy) Bruno Giacomelli	Porsche 962C	C1	303	DNF	DNF
1990	(United Kingdom) Team Davey	(Morocco) Max Cohen-Olivar (United Kingdom) Tim Lee-Davey	Porsche 962C	C1	306	19th	19th
1992	(Germany) Porsche Kremer Racing	(Germany) Manuel Reuter (Denmark) John Nielsen	Porsche 962CK6	C3	334	7th	**2nd**
1993	(Germany) Porsche Kremer Racing	(Germany) Jürgen Lässig (South Africa) Wayne Taylor	Porsche 962CK6	C2	328	12th	7th
2000	(Spain) Repsol Racing Engineering	(Spain) Tomás Saldaña (Spain) Jesús Diez Villaroel	Porsche 911 GT3-R	GT	78	DNF	DNF

=== Complete International Formula 3000 results ===
(key) (Races in bold indicate pole position; races in italics indicate fastest lap.)

Year	Entrant	1	2	3	4	5	6	7	8	9	10	DC	Points
1991	Crypton Engineering	VAL; DNQ	PAU; DNQ	JER; DNQ	MUG; DNQ	PER; Ret						NC	0
1991	Roni Team						HOC; DNQ	BRH; DNQ	SPA; DNQ	BUG; DNQ	NOG; 12	NC	0

=== American Open-Wheel racing results ===
(key) (Races in bold indicate pole position, races in italics indicate fastest race lap)

==== PPG Indycar Series ====
(key) (Races in bold indicate pole position)

Year	Team	No.	Chassis	Engine	1	2	3	4	5	6	7	8	9	10	11	12	13	14	15	16	Rank	Points	Ref
1994	Euromotorsports	50	Lola T9300	Ilmor C	SRF	PHX	LBH	INDY	MIL	DET; DNQ	POR										**38th**	**0**	
1994	Leader Cards Racing	23	Lola T9300	Ilmor C								CLE; 30	TOR	MCH	MDO	NHA	VAN	ROA; 15	NAZ	LAG; DNQ	**38th**	**0**	

=== Complete Formula One results ===
(key)

Year	Entrant	Chassis	Engine	1	2	3	4	5	6	7	8	9	10	11	12	13	14	15	16	17	WDC	Points
1995	Pacific Grand Prix Ltd	Pacific PR02	Ford V8	BRA	ARG	SMR	ESP	MON	CAN	FRA	GBR	GER; Ret	HUN; Ret	BEL; Ret	ITA; Ret	POR	EUR	PAC	JPN	AUS	NC	0
1996	Minardi Team	Minardi M195B	Ford V8	AUS	BRA	ARG	EUR	SMR	MON	ESP	CAN	FRA	GBR	GER; DNQ	HUN; 10†	BEL; DNQ	ITA; Ret	POR; 15	JPN; DNQ		NC	0

† Driver did not finish the race, but was still classified as they completely 90% of the race distance.

=== Complete Le Mans Series results ===
(key) (Races in bold indicate pole position; races in italics indicate fastest lap)

Year	Entrant	Class	Car	Engine	1	2	3	4	5	6	Pos.	Pts
2004	Auto Palace	GT	Ferrari 360 Modena GTC	Ferrari 3.6L V8	MNZ; Ret	NÜR; 6	SIL; Ret	SPA			22nd	4
2005	James Watt Automotive	GT2	Porsche 911 GT3-RS	Porsche 3.6L Flat-6	SPA; Ret	MNZ	SIL	NÜR	IST		NC	0
2006	Lavaggi Sport	LMP1	Lavaggi LS1	Ford (PME) 6.0L V8	IST	SPA	NÜR	DON	JAR; Ret		NC	0
2007	Scuderia Lavaggi	LMP1	Lavaggi LS1	Ford (PME) 6.0L V8	MNZ; Ret	VAL	NÜR; Ret	SPA; Ret	SIL	INT	NC	0
2008	Scuderia Lavaggi	LMP1	Lavaggi LS1	AER P32C 4.0 L Turbo V8	CAT; Ret	MNZ	SPA; Ret	NÜR; NC	SIL		NC	0
2009	Scuderia Lavaggi	LMP1	Lavaggi LS1	AER P32C 4.0 L Turbo V8	CAT	SPA; NC	ALG	NÜR; Ret	SIL		NC	0
