= Lavaggi LS1 =

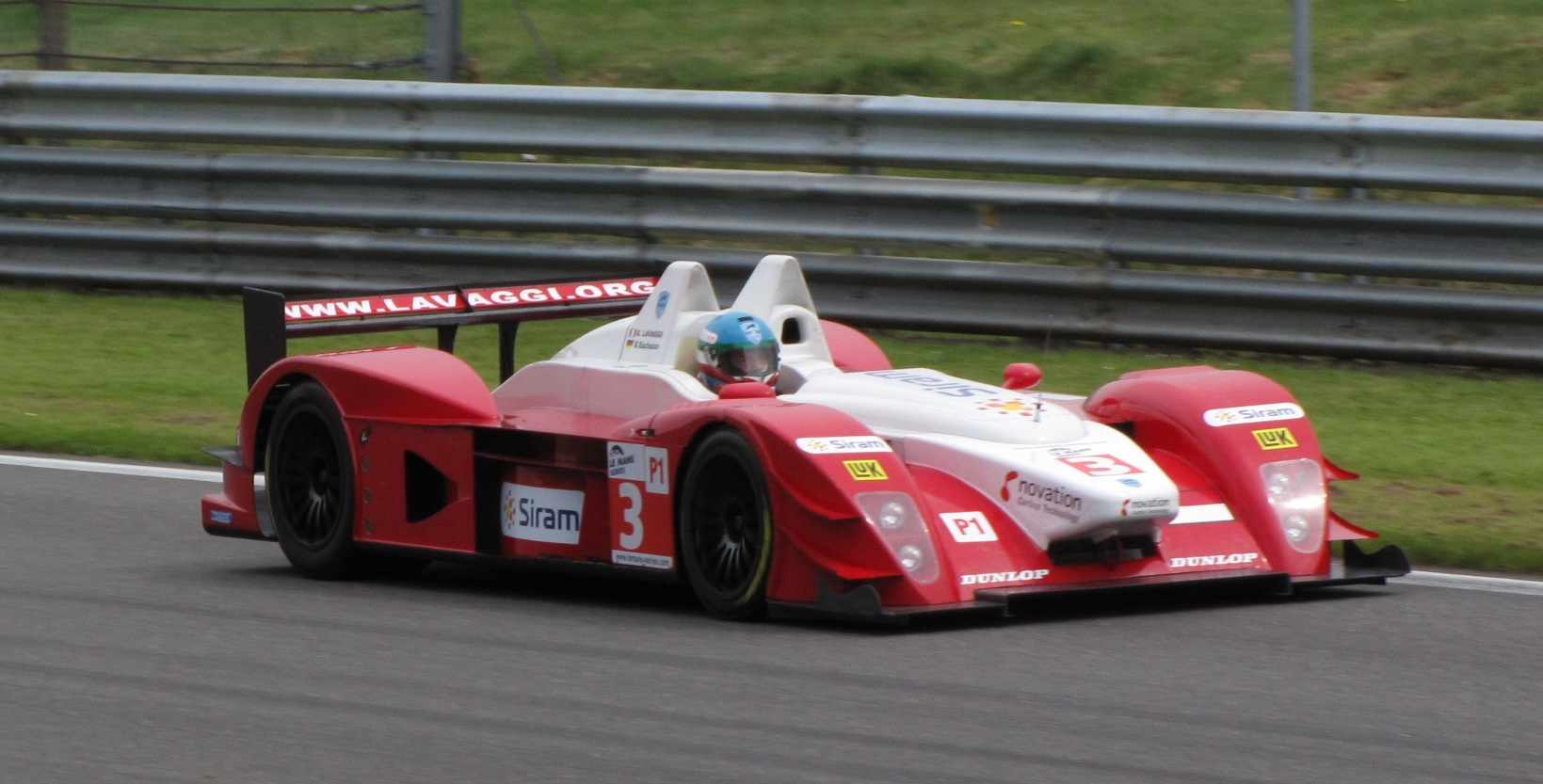
- Category: LMP1
- Constructor: Scuderia Lavaggi
- Designer: Giovanni Lavaggi

Technical specifications
- Chassis: Carbon fibre composite monocoque
- Suspension (front): Double wishbone, push-rod actuated springs connected to Sachs dampers, with anti-roll bar
- Suspension (rear): Double wishbone, push-rod actuated springs connected to Sachs dampers, with anti-roll bar
- Length: 4,650 mm (183.1 in)
- Width: 2,000 mm (78.7 in)
- Wheelbase: 2,865 mm (112.8 in)
- Engine: 2006–2007: PME-built Ford 6,000 cc (366.1 cu in) 16-valve, OHV V8, mid engine mounted longitudinally 2008–2009: AER P32C 4,000 cc (244.1 cu in) 32 valve, DOHC V8 with twin-turbochargers
- Transmission: Hewland 6-speed sequential manual
- Weight: 925 kg (2,039.3 lb)
- Tyres: Dunlop

Competition history
- Notable entrants: Scuderia Lavaggi
- Notable drivers: Giovanni Lavaggi; Xavier Pompidou; Marcelo Puglisi; Cristian Corsini; Wolfgang Kaufmann
- Debut: 2006 1000km of Nürburgring
Races	Wins	Poles	F/Laps
11 (12 entries)	0 (1 class)	1	1
- Teams' Championships: 0
- Constructors' Championships: 0
- Drivers' Championships: 0

The Lavaggi LS1 is a Le Mans Prototype (LMP1) built by Scuderia Lavaggi of the former F1 driver Giovanni Lavaggi. Completed in 2006, the LS1, initially using a 6-litre Ford V8 engine, made its racing debut at the last race of the year at Jarama, driven by the driver-constructor himself and by Xavier Pompidou as co-driver. With no previous tests whatsoever, in the second free practices, the car was just 2.8 seconds slower than the fastest one, even if slowed down by electronic problems, which pestered the team during the whole race weekend and caused also two engines failure.

The following years, Scuderia Lavaggi was strongly affected by the 2008 financial crisis. The sponsors who were supporting the Lavaggi LS1 project disappeared and Giovanni had to face the racing seasons and the car’s updates imposed by the rules changes, with his own resources.

For 2010, ACO imposed new rules that would have meant heavy modifications to the Lavaggi LS1, including the adoption of a different type of engine. Then, persisting the bad financial global situation, Giovanni Lavaggi decided to retire the car at the end of the 2009 season.

== Development ==
In 2004, the FIA and the ACO launched a unique new regulation for sports cars, split in two classes called LMP1 And LMP2. Giovanni Lavaggi, who is a mechanical engineer from the "Politecnico of Milan", motivated by the desire to emulate those men who have written motorsport history (such as Jack Brabham, Bruce McLaren, Enzo Ferrari, and others), decided to start his own project and, actually, has managed to bring a myth back to life: the myth of the "driver-constructor". Giovanni Lavaggi: "The idea to participate in races with a car designed and built by myself was always one of my wishes. Since I was a little boy, the high admiration I always felt for the real big names in the motorsport world, was making me dream that I could be able to emulate them one day. And who knows? May be the fact of being born on 18th February, exactly the same day as Enzo Ferrari, has influenced my destiny by an unknown astrological effect and keeps my passion burning." [1] The Lavaggi LS1 was the first Le Mans Prototype to have been built and designed in Monte Carlo. The car featured a 6-litre Ford-based V8 engine (built in North Carolina by Pro-Motor Engines) mated to a 6-speed gearbox designed by Lavaggi on a Hewland base, and was painted in the red-and-white racing livery of Monaco. It has a carbon fibre composite monocoque chassis, and uses Brembo carbon disc brakes with six-piston calipers, whilst the front and rear suspensions consist of double wishbones, push-rod actuated springs connected to Sachs dampers, and anti-roll bars . The car made its first public static appearance at the 1000 km of Nürburgring in July 2006, which was the third round of the Le Mans Series (LMS).

== Racing history ==
=== 2006–2007 ===
Two races later, at the LMS season finale (the 1000 km of Jarama), the car competed for the first time, with Lavaggi partnering Xavier Pompidou. The team had struggled with engine and engine management issues all weekend. The car’s electric project and installation had been entrusted to a third party therefore Scuderia Lavaggi found itself in a difficult situation. During winter, Giovanni Lavaggi found out the electronic problem, which was solved designing in house new looms. Unfortunately, in the 2007 pre-season test held at Paul Ricard, other two engines broke down, this time because of internal lubrication problem. It took the whole season to realize that the problem was due to the wrong design of the dry sump. The Scuderia Lavaggi took part at the Monza event where Marcello Puglisi was selected as second driver. Puglisi was replaced by Cristian Corsini for the 1000 km of Nürburgring and the car's last appearance of the 2007 season came at the 1000 km of Spa, where Wolfgang Kaufmann was selected to partner Lavaggi. Troubled from engine failures Scuderia Lavaggi couldn’t finish any of those races; just in Spa, two engines had to be replaced. In fact, at the end of the season, Lavaggi stated that he hadn't had a single mechanical issue apart from the engine failures, with the rest of the car proving reliable despite having covered around 2,500 km (1,553 mi), and the limited testing the team had done.

=== 2008–2009 ===
After the numerous problems with the engine, Lavaggi replaced the Ford unit with a 4.0-litre AER P32C twin-turbocharged V8; That was a big effort for the small Scuderia Lavaggi, especially because the team lost its supporters due to the 2008 financial crisis. Lavaggi, with Kaufmann as co-driver, was still able to do three races of the Le Mans Series. This time Scuderia Lavaggi had bad luck suffering minor problems that prevented the team from scoring any result. At Barcelona the alternator broke down, at Spa the fuel dry-break coupling suddenly disconnected, which made the car stop at Stavelot corner and, at Nürburgring, a joint failure on the engine caused a water leak and the engine overheating. Hopefully the good engine installation made by Scuderia Lavaggi prevented the engine from breaking down and the car could see the chequered flag, but, because of the time lost in the pits to solve the problem, the laps completed were not enough to be classified as a finisher. The car's final entry of the season came in the non-championship 6 Hours of Vallelunga event; Lavaggi and Kaufmann took pole position and the fastest lap, but an engine oil leak affecting the clutch, relegated the car from the 1st to the 10th place overall.

Despite the poor financial situation, and the changes to the LMP regulations for 2009, imposing heavy modifications to the car, Lavaggi opted to carry on running the LS1 for another season. Having not enough money to study the modifications in a wind tunnel, the aerodynamic changes made the car very difficult to drive and the performance was very poor. At the first race in Spa, although the car was running at the end of the race, the pair had completed just 49 laps due to a broken electronic cable, and were not classified. One more LMS entry would follow, in the fourth round of the series (the 1000 km of Nürburgring), but this time the car lasted little longer than 40 minutes, and 21 laps, before being retired because of a clutch failure. This would prove to be the LS1's last race, as an entry at the 6 Hours of Vallelunga was unsuccessful; the organizers opted to allow slower touring cars to compete, and the LS1, as the single LMP1 entry, was deemed too fast to compete with them, and Lavaggi withdrew the car.

At present, the Lavaggi LS1 is in the 2008 configuration with the AER engine still installed. Since Giancarlo Minardi organises the "Minardi Day" at Imola circuit, Lavaggi is honouring the event showing up with his car. In the future, it might be possible to see the car competing again in an historic championship, such as "FIA Masters" or "Endurance Global Legends".
