= Debora =

French automobile manufacturer

Debora Racing Cars is a French car builder, popular with private racing teams, based in Besançon, France. Teams generally use their chassis to take part in Le Mans style endurance racing such as Magny Cours, Jarama and le Mans.

Engines have been known to come from a 3-litre BMW and a 2-litre Ford Cosworth Turbo on the Jarama racetrack 1997.

Sponsored by Waterair in 1998 the Debora two car team did a little better with one of the cars coming in 15th a mere 19 laps behind the winner.

Later in '98 at the ISRS world championships, Debora carried off the trophy for SR2 driven by De Castelli, Jakubowski & Bruneau.

In July 2000 during the US Le Mans series held at the Nürburgring in Germany, a private driving the Orphee-sponsored Debora car powered by a BMW engine came tenth. Full details of the race finishers can be found here.

In 2001 at the Le Mans series they did not finish as the car overheated due to a water leak after 48 laps. But at ELMS, Debora took the category SR2 with Dussau et Gomez

in Magny Cours 2002 French hopes in SR2 rested with PiR Competition with their selection of Pilbeam and Debora chassis. Team boss/driver Pierre Bruneau hoped that local Sodemo Peugeot power would thrust them towards the front. "We have tested at Magny Cours about six weeks ago with the Pilbeam and got some good results", said the enthusiastic Bruneau. "We also took the Debora to Dijon last week and made a lot of improvements, so we are confident of some good points this weekend." British racer Paul Daniels also showed well that season and teamed up in the Debora with Frenchman Philippe Hottinguer (who drove with the team at Barcelona) and Italian Ludovico Manfredi (who drove for PiR at the corresponding event in 2001). More home support came in the way of Didier Bonnet's return to the Championship with his faithful Debora BMW combination.

== Cars ==
- Debora LMP200, used between 2001 and 2003.
- Debora LMP201, used in 1995.
- Debora LMP294, used in 1994.
- Debora LMP295, used in 1995.
- Debora LMP296, used between 1996 and 1999.
- Debora LMP297, used between 1997 and 1998.
- Debora LMP299, used between 2000 and 2002.
- Debora LMP2000, used in 2000.
- Debora SP92, used in 1992.
- Debora SP93, used in 1993 and 1998
