= Circuito del Jarama =

Motorsport venue in Madrid, Spain

Circuito de Madrid Jarama - RACE
- Grand Prix Circuit (1991–present)

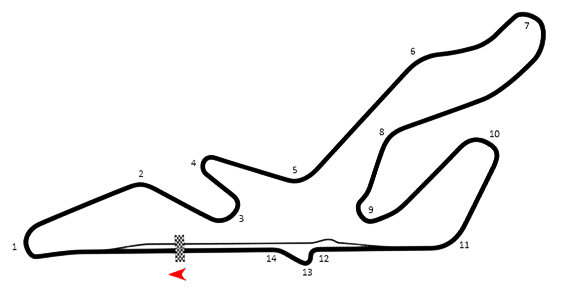
- Formula E Circuit (2026)
- Location: San Sebastián de los Reyes, Spain
- Coordinates: 40°37′2″N 3°35′8″W
- Capacity: 25,000
- FIA Grade: 2 (Grand Prix); FE (Fórmula E)
- Owner: Royal Automobile Club of Spain (1981–present)
- Broke ground: 1966
- Opened: 1 July 1967; 59 years ago
- Architect: John Hugenholtz
- Former names: Circuito del Jarama; Circuito Permanente del Jarama
- Major events: Current: Formula E Madrid ePrix (2026); FIA European Truck Racing Championship; GP Camiones de España (1987–2019, 2021–present); TCR Spain (2021–2022, 2024, 2026); Former: Formula One; Spanish Grand Prix (1968, 1970, 1972, 1974, 1976–1979, 1981); Grand Prix motorcycle racing 5 different motorcycle Grands Prix including Spanish motorcycle Grand Prix (1969, 1971, 1973, 1975, 1977–1988, 1991, 1993, 1998); European Le Mans Series; 1000 km Jarama (2001, 2006); World SBK (1991–1992); FIM Endurance World Championship (1969, 1983); FIA ETCR (2022); Sidecar World Championship (1981, 1991); FIA GT (2001–2002); Superleague Formula (2009–2010); ETCC (1968–1972, 1974–1979, 1985–1986, 1988, 2001–2002); World Sportscar Championship (1987–1989); World Touring Car Championship (1987)
- Website: http://www.jarama.org/

Grand Prix Circuit (1991–present)
- Length: 3.850 km (2.392 mi)
- Turns: 14
- Race lap record: 1:20.011 ( (Netherlands) Yelmer Buurman, Panoz DP09, 2009, SF)

Formula E Circuit (2026)
- Length: 3.934 km (2.444 mi)
- Turns: 14
- Race lap record: 1:32.941 ( (Netherlands) Nyck de Vries, Mahindra M12Electro, 2026, F-E)

Grand Prix Circuit (1980–1990)
- Length: 3.314 km (2.059 mi)
- Turns: 14
- Race lap record: 1:15.467 ( (Australia) Alan Jones, Williams FW07B, 1980, F1)

Original Grand Prix Circuit (1967–1979)
- Length: 3.404 km (2.115 mi)
- Turns: 15
- Race lap record: 1:16.440 ( (Canada) Gilles Villeneuve, Ferrari 312T4, 1979, F1)

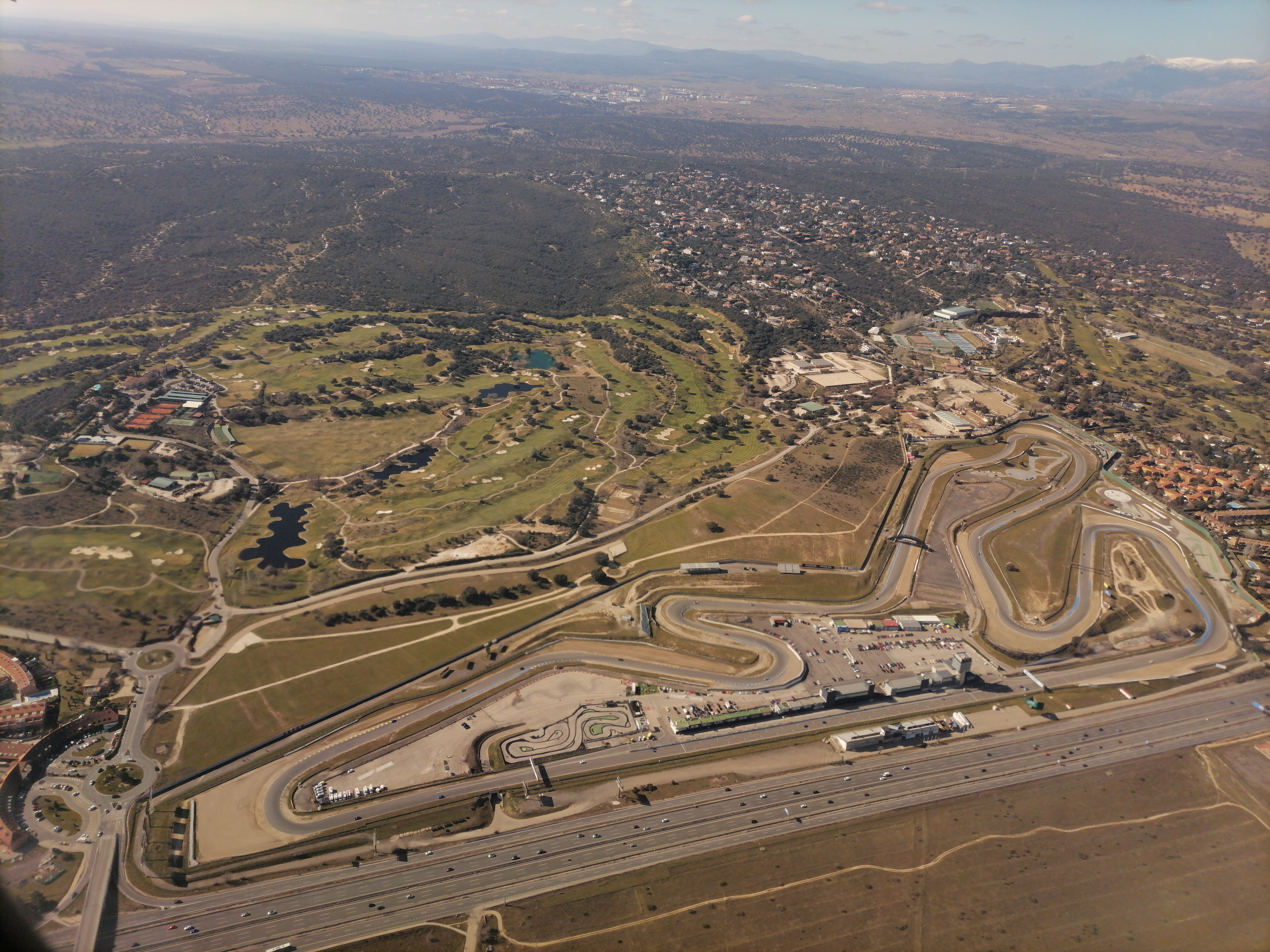
Aerial view of the Jarama Circuit in 2023.

The Circuito de Madrid Jarama - RACE, formerly known as Circuito del Jarama and Circuito Permanente del Jarama, is a motorsport racetrack located in San Sebastián de los Reyes, 32 km (20 mi) north of Madrid. It was home to the Spanish Grand Prix nine times between 1968 and 1981, and the Spanish motorcycle Grand Prix 15 times between 1969 and 1988.

Designed by John Hugenholtz (who also created Suzuka), the 3.850 km (2.392 mi) circuit was built by Alessandro Rocci in 1967 on arid scrub land.

== History ==
It has a short main straight and most of the course consisted of tight, twisty corners so overtaking was extremely difficult. An example of this came when Gilles Villeneuve successfully defended his lead throughout the 1981 Spanish Grand Prix, despite a tail of four potentially faster cars. Villeneuve's turbocharged Ferrari 126CK, while powerful and fast on the straight, did not have as efficient ground effect aerodynamics as his pursuers - Jacques Laffite (V12 Ligier-Matra), John Watson (McLaren-Ford), Carlos Reutemann (Williams-Ford), and Elio de Angelis (Lotus-Ford) and was slower through the turns. This victory was to be the last one of Villeneuve's career.

Jarama hosted its last Formula One race in 1981 when it was deemed too narrow for modern racing. It still holds sports car, touring car and motorcycle races. The circuit was lengthened in 1991, and then upgraded in 2015.

In 1987, Jarama hosted Round 2 of the inaugural World Touring Car Championship for Group A cars, the 1987 Jarama 4 Hours. The race was won by Roberto Ravaglia and Emanuele Pirro driving a Schnitzer Motorsport BMW M3 (E30). Pole position for the race had been taken by triple Le Mans 24 Hour winner Klaus Ludwig in a Ford Sierra RS Cosworth turbo with a time of 1:31.434, while the fastest lap was by England's Andy Rouse (also in a Sierra Cosworth) with a time of 1:33.710.

Since February 2022, the circuit's name is changed as Circuito de Madrid Jarama - RACE.

== Layout history ==
Circuito de Madrid Jarama - RACE Layout History
Original Grand Prix Circuit (1967–1990)

Grand Prix Circuit (1991–present)

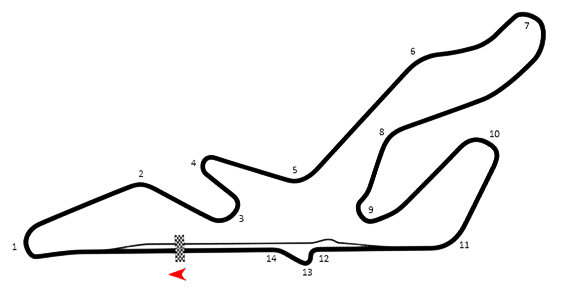
Formula E Circuit (2026)

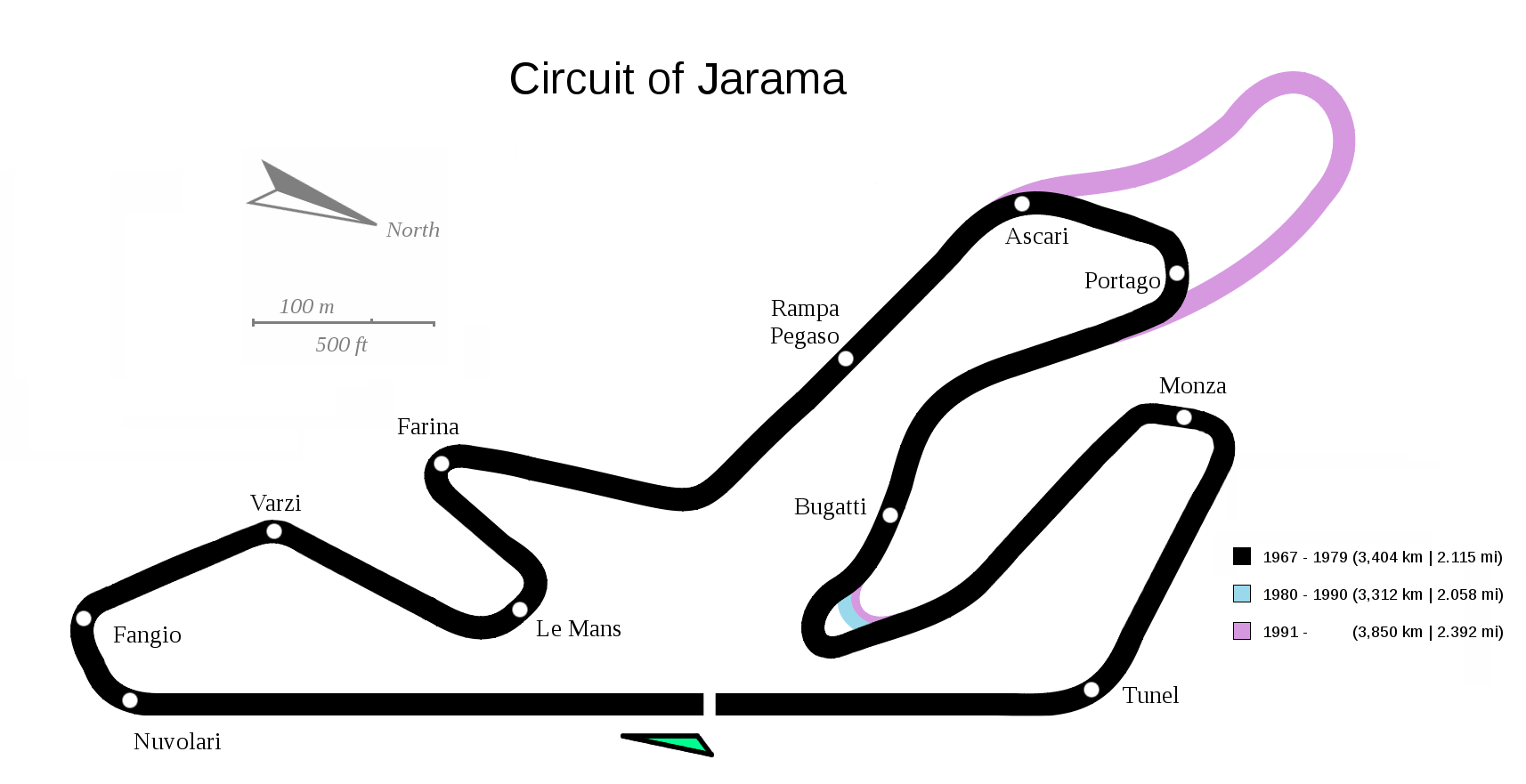
Differences of Circuito del Jarama layouts

== Events ==
Current

- March: Formula E Madrid ePrix, TCR Spain Touring Car Championship, Eurocup-3 Spanish Winter Championship, GR Cup Spain, Copa Nacional Renault, Eurocup-4 Spanish Winter Championship
- May: Drift Masters
- June: Supercars Endurance Series Jarama Classic
- August: F4 Spanish Championship
- October: FIA European Truck Racing Championship GP Camiones de España, Spanish Truck Championship

Former

- BPR Global GT Series
  - 4 Hours of Jarama (1994–1996)
- EuroBOSS Series (2008)
- European 2-Litre Sports Car Championship (1971–1972, 1974)
- European F3 Open Championship (2001–2010)
- European Formula Two Championship (1967–1969, 1971, 1983)
- European Touring Car Championship (1968–1972, 1974–1979, 1985–1986, 1988, 2001–2002)
- FIA European Formula 3 Championship (1977–1984)
- FIA ETCR – eTouring Car World Cup (2022)
- FIA GT Championship (2001–2002)
- FIA GT3 European Championship (2010)
- FIM Endurance World Championship (1969, 1983)
- Formula 750 (1974, 1976–1978)
- Formula One
  - Spanish Grand Prix (1968, 1970, 1972, 1974, 1976–1981)
- Formula Renault 2000 Eurocup (1994, 1996, 1998–1999, 2001–2002)
- French Formula Renault Championship (1986, 1994)
- Grand Prix motorcycle racing
  - European motorcycle Grand Prix (1991)
  - FIM motorcycle Grand Prix (1993)
  - Madrid motorcycle Grand Prix (1998)
  - Portuguese motorcycle Grand Prix (1987)
  - Spanish motorcycle Grand Prix (1969, 1971, 1973, 1975, 1977–1986, 1988)
- GTR Euroseries (1998)
- IMSA European Le Mans Series (2001)
- International Formula 3000 (1986–1987)
- International Sports Racing Series (1997)
- Le Mans Series
  - 1000 km Jarama (2006)
- Sidecar World Championship (1981, 1991)
- Superbike World Championship (1991–1992)
- Superleague Formula
  - Superleague Formula round Spain (2009–2010)
- TCR Europe Touring Car Series (2020)
- V de V Sports (2007–2011, 2017)
- World Series by Nissan (1998–2004)
- World Sportscar Championship
  - Trofeo Repsol Jarama (1987–1989)
- World Touring Car Championship (1987)

== Lap records ==
Klaas Zwart held the unofficial lap record with a lap of 1:16.994 with Jaguar R5 in a demonstration event in 2017. As of June 2026, the fastest official race lap records at the Circuito de Madrid Jarama - RACE are listed as:

Category	Time	Driver	Vehicle	Event
Grand Prix Circuit (1991–present): 3.850 km (2.392 mi)
Superleague Formula	1:20.011	Yelmer Buurman	Panoz DP09	2009 Jarama Superleague Formula round
LMP900	1:23.034	Emanuele Pirro	Audi R8	2001 ELMS at Jarama
Formula Nissan	1:23.530	Ricardo Zonta	Dallara SN01	2002 Jarama Formula Nissan round
Group C	1:24.200	Oscar Larrauri	Porsche 962C	1992 Jarama Interserie round
LMP1	1:24.570	Jean-Marc Gounon	Courage LC70	2006 1000 km of Jarama
Interserie	1:24.770	Frederico Careca	HSB-Penske PC-18 Buick	1993 Jarama Interserie round
Eurocup-3	1:25.391	Keanu Al Azhari	Dallara 326	2026 Jarama Eurocup-3 Spanish Winter Championship round
Formula One	1:25.657	Karl-Heinz Becker	Minardi M190	1995 Jarama Interserie round
LMP2	1:26.138	Miguel Angel Castro	Lola B05/40	2006 1000 km of Jarama
Group C2	1:27.490	Ranieri Randaccio	Spice SE90C	1993 Jarama Interserie round
LMP675	1:27.792	Didier de Radiguès	Reynard 01Q	2001 ELMS at Jarama
LMP3	1:29.200	Nelson Panciatici	Norma M30	2017 Jarama 4 Hours
Formula Three	1:29.375	José Manuel Pérez-Aicart	Dallara F305	2005 Jarama Spanish F3 round
WSC	1:29.472	Jérôme Policand	Courage C41	1997 International Sports Racing Series Jarama
GT1 (GTS)	1:29.783	Stéphane Ortelli	Saleen S7-R	2006 1000 km of Jarama
GT3	1:32.018	Jean-Bernard Bouvet	Ferrari 488 GT3	2017 Jarama 4 Hours
Formula 4	1:32.303	Kas Haverkort	Tatuus F4-T014	2020 Jarama F4 Spain round
GT1 (Prototype)	1:32.627	Geoff Lees	McLaren F1 GTR	1998 GTR Euroseries Jarama 4 Hours
GT2	1:33.248	Vimal Metha	Ferrari F430 GT2	2010 Jarama Spanish GT round
GT1	1:33.345	Jean-Marc Gounon	Ferrari F40 GTE	1996 BPR 4 Hours of Jarama
500cc	1:33.617	Carlos Checa	Honda NSR500	1998 Madrid motorcycle Grand Prix
Formula Renault 2.0	1:33.950	César Campaniço	Tatuus FR2000	2001 Jarama Formula Renault 2000 Eurocup round
GT	1:34.268	Dirk Müller	BMW M3 GTR	2001 ELMS at Jarama
250cc	1:34.941	Loris Capirossi	Honda NSR250	1993 FIM motorcycle Grand Prix
N-GT	1:36.091	Luca Riccitelli	Porsche 911 GT3-RS	2001 FIA GT Jarama 500km
Super Touring	1:36.733	Fabrizio Giovanardi	Alfa Romeo 156 D2	2001 Jarama ESTC round
World SBK	1:36.955	Doug Polen	Ducati 888 SBK	1992 Jarama World SBK round
GT4	1:37.594	Mathieu Martins	Aston Martin Vantage GT4 Evo	2026 Jarama SuperCars Endurance round
TCR Touring Car	1:38.265	Isidro Callejas	CUPRA León Competición TCR	2022 Jarama TCR Spain round
125cc	1:39.330	Kazuto Sakata	Aprilia RS125R	1998 Madrid motorcycle Grand Prix
ETCR	1:40.706	Maxime Martin	Alfa Romeo Giulia ETCR	2022 Jarama FIA ETCR round
Super 2000	1:43.094	Fabrizio Giovanardi	Alfa Romeo 156 GTA	2002 Jarama ETCC round
Renault Clio Cup	1:46.376	Alejandro Royo	Renault Clio R.S. IV	2017 Jarama Renault Clio Cup Spain round
Toyota GR Cup	1:48.640	Marco Aguilera	Toyota GR86	2026 Jarama Toyota GR Cup Spain round
Truck racing	1:57.392	Jochen Hahn	MAN TGS	2018 Jarama ETRC round
Formula E Circuit (2026): 3.934 km (2.444 mi)
Formula E	1:32.941	Nyck de Vries	Mahindra M12Electro	2026 Madrid ePrix
Grand Prix Circuit (1980–1990): 3.314 km (2.059 mi)
F1	1:15.467	Alan Jones	Williams FW07B	1980 Spanish Grand Prix
Group C	1:17.871	Hans-Joachim Stuck	Porsche 962C	1987 360 km of Jarama
F3000	1:19.510	Michel Ferte	March 86B	1986 Jarama F3000 round
Formula Two	1:20.020	Mike Thackwell	Ralt RH6/83	1983 Gran Premio de Madrid
Formula Three	1:23.440	Johnny Dumfries	Ralt RT3	1984 Jarama F3 round
Group C2	1:23.669	Fermín Vélez	Spice SE89C	1989 480 km of Jarama
500cc	1:27.990	Wayne Gardner	Honda NSR500	1987 Portuguese motorcycle Grand Prix
250cc	1:30.120	Sito Pons	Honda NSR250	1988 Spanish motorcycle Grand Prix
125cc	1:33.250	August Auinger	Morbidelli 125	1987 Portuguese motorcycle Grand Prix
Group A	1:33.710	Andy Rouse	Ford Sierra RS Cosworth	1987 Jarama 4 Hours
50cc	1:47.070	Eugenio Lazzarini	Garelli 50 GP	1983 Spanish motorcycle Grand Prix
Grand Prix Circuit (1967–1979): 3.404 km (2.115 mi)
F1	1:16.440	Gilles Villeneuve	Ferrari 312T4	1979 Spanish Grand Prix
Sports 2000	1:24.450	Jean-Pierre Jabouille	Alpine A441	1974 Jarama 2-Litre Championship round
Formula Three	1:27.290	Alain Prost	Martini MK21B	1978 Jarama European F3 round
Formula Two	1:28.200	Jean-Pierre Beltoise	Matra MS7	1968 Jarama F2 round
Group 6	1:30.700	Jorge de Bagration	Porsche 908/02	1970 Jarama Spanish SCC round
Formula 5000	1:30.900	Peter Gethin	McLaren M10A	1969 Madrid Grand Prix
Group 5 sports car	1:30.900	Alex Soler-Roig	Porsche 917	1970 Jarama Trofeo Primavera
500cc	1:33.900	Kenny Roberts	Yamaha YZR500	1979 Spanish motorcycle Grand Prix
Group 2	1:34.740	Toine Hezemans	Ford Capri RS3100	1974 Jarama ETCC round
Group 4	1:35.420	Reinhold Jöst	Porsche Carrera RSR	1975 Jarama ETCC round
250cc	1:36.200	Kork Ballington	Kawasaki KR250	1979 Spanish motorcycle Grand Prix
350cc	1:39.900	Michel Rougerie	Yamaha TZ 350	1977 Spanish motorcycle Grand Prix
125cc	1:42.000	Ángel Nieto	Minarelli 125 GP	1979 Spanish motorcycle Grand Prix
Group 5 touring car	1:46.100	Dieter Quester	BMW 2002 Ti	1969 Jarama ETCC round
50cc	1:50.300	Eugenio Lazzarini	Kreidler 50 GP	1977 Spanish motorcycle Grand Prix
Group 3	2:09.100	Juan Merelo	Alpine A110	1970 Jarama Spanish SCC round
