= 1000 km Jarama =

1000 Km del Jarama
- Venue: Circuito del Jarama
- First race: 1967
- Last race: 2006
- Most wins (driver): Alex Soler-Roig (3)
- Most wins (team): GTC Motorsport (3)
- Most wins (manufacturer): Porsche (5)

The 1000 Kilometres of Jarama is a sports car race held at Circuito del Jarama in San Sebastián de los Reyes, Spain. The race began in 1967, and has been a part of the European 2-Litre Sportscar Championship, World Sportscar Championship, BPR Global GT Series, International Sports Racing Series, European Le Mans Series, and Le Mans Series.

== Results ==
| Year | Overall winner(s) | Entrant | Car | Distance/Duration | Race title | Championship | Report |
|---|---|---|---|---|---|---|---|
| 1967 | (Spain) Alex Soler-Roig | | Porsche 906 | 100 km (62 mi) | Gran Premio de Madrid | Non-championship | report |
1968: Not held
| 1969 | (Austria) Jochen Rindt (Spain) Alex Soler-Roig | | Porsche 908/02 | 6 hours | 6 Horas de Jarama | Non-championship | report |
| 1970 | (Spain) Alex Soler-Roig (Germany) Jürgen Neuhaus | (West Germany) Gesipa Racing | Porsche 908/02 | 6 hours | 6 Horas de Jarama | Non-championship | report |
| 1971 | (Sweden) Jo Bonnier | (Switzerland) Scuderia Filipinetti | Lola T212-Ford | 2 hours | 2 Horas de Jarama | European 2-Litre Championship | report |
| 1972 | (United Kingdom) Derek Bell | (Spain) Escuderia Nacional CS | Abarth Osella SE-021 | 2 hours | Trofeo SEAT | European 2-Litre Championship | report |
1973: Not held
| 1974 | (France) Jean-Pierre Jabouille | (France) Société Alpine | Alpine A441-Renault | 2 hours | 2 Horas de Jarama | European 2-Litre Championship | report |
| 1975 | (Australia) Tim Schenken | (West Germany) Gelo Racing Team Georg Loos | Porsche Carrera RSR | 200 km (120 mi) | 200 km Jarama | European GT Championship | report |
1976-1986: Not held
| 1987 | (Netherlands) Jan Lammers (United Kingdom) John Watson | (United Kingdom) Silk Cut Jaguar | Jaguar XJR-8 | 360 km (220 mi) | Gran Premio Fortuna | World Sportscar Championship | report |
| 1988 | (United States) Eddie Cheever (United Kingdom) Martin Brundle | (United Kingdom) Silk Cut Jaguar | Jaguar XJR-9 | 360 km (220 mi) | Supersprint Jarama | World Sportscar Championship | report |
| 1989 | (West Germany) Jochen Mass (France) Jean-Louis Schlesser | (Switzerland) Team Sauber Mercedes | Sauber-Mercedes C9/88 | 480 km (300 mi) | Trofeo Repsol Jarama | World Sportscar Championship | report |
1990-1993: Not held
| 1994 | (Spain) Jesús Pareja (France) Jean-Pierre Jarier (France) Dominique Dupuy | (France) Larbre Compétition | Porsche 911 Turbo S LM | 4 hours | Gran Premio Repsol | BPR Global GT Series | report |
| 1995 | (Brazil) Maurizio Sandro Sala (United Kingdom) Ray Bellm | (United Kingdom) Gulf Racing/GTC | McLaren F1 GTR | 4 hours | Gran Premio Repsol | BPR Global GT Series | report |
| 1996 | (United Kingdom) James Weaver (United Kingdom) Ray Bellm | (United Kingdom) Gulf Racing/GTC Motorsport | McLaren F1 GTR | 4 hours | Gran Premio Repsol | BPR Global GT Series | report |
| 1997 | (France) Didier Cottaz (France) Jérôme Policand | (France) Courage Compétition | Courage C41-Porsche | 2 hours | Gran Premio Repsol | International Sports Racing Series | report |
| 1998 | (Germany) Thomas Bscher (United Kingdom) Geoff Lees | (United Kingdom) GTC/Davidoff Classics | McLaren F1 GTR | 4 hours | Gran Premio Repsol | GTR Euroseries | report |
1999-2000: Not held
| 2001 | (Italy) Rinaldo Capello (Denmark) Tom Kristensen | (Germany) Audi Sport North America | Audi R8 | 2 hours, 45 minutes | Repsol European Le Mans Series | American Le Mans Series; European Le Mans Series | report |
2002-2005: Not held
| 2006 | (France) Emmanuel Collard (France) Jean-Christophe Boullion (France) Didier André | (France) Pescarolo Sport | Pescarolo C60 Hybrid-Judd | 1,000 km (620 mi) | 1000 km del Jarama | Le Mans Series | report |
