= Courage C60 =

Racing automobile

Courage C60/C60 EVO/C60 Hybrid Pescarolo C60/C60 Hybrid
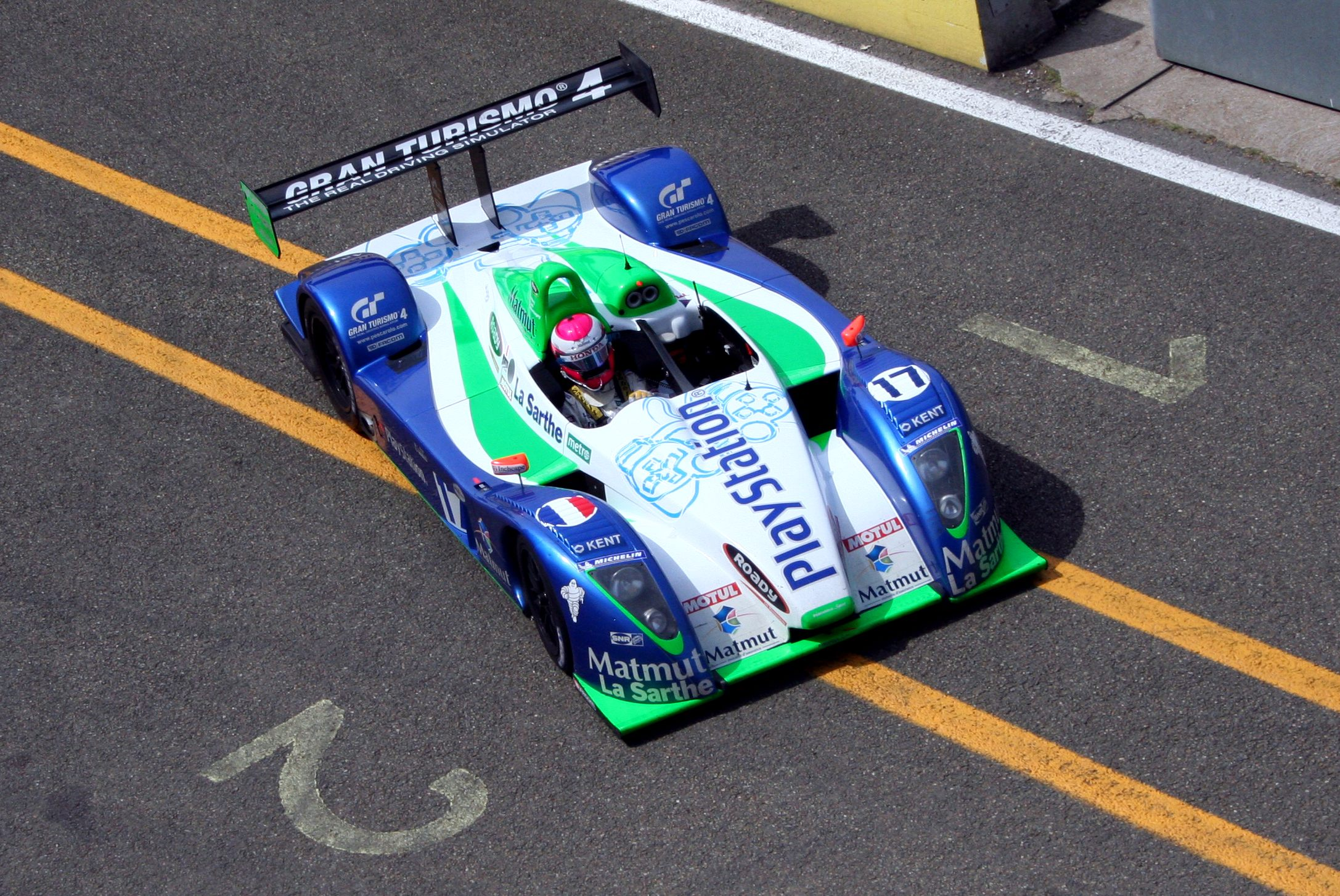
- The No. 17 Pescarolo C60 Hybrid at the 2006 24 Hours of Le Mans
- Category: LMP900/LMP1
- Constructor: Courage Compétition
- Designer(s): Paolo Catone (original); André de Cortanze (EVO and Hybrids)
- Predecessor: Courage C52
- Successor: Courage LC70; Pescarolo 01

Technical specifications
- Chassis: Carbon fibre and aluminium honeycomb monocoque
- Suspension (front): Double wishbone, pushrods and horizontally-located dynamic dampers
- Suspension (rear): Double wishbone, pushrods and horizontally-located dynamic dampers
- Length: 4,428–4,650 mm (174.3–183.1 in)
- Width: 2,000 mm (78.7 in)
- Wheelbase: 2,790–2,809 mm (109.8–110.6 in)
- Engine: Judd GV4 3,997 cc (243.9 cu in) 40 valve, DOHC V10, naturally-aspirated, mid-mounted, rear wheel drive Sodemo-Peugeot A32 3,200 cc (195.3 cu in) 24 valve, DOHC V6, twin-turbocharged Judd GV5 4,997 cc (304.9 cu in) 40 valve, DOHC V10, naturally-aspirated
- Transmission: X-Trac 6-speed sequential manual
- Weight: 900–927 kg (1,984–2,044 lb)
- Tyres: Pirelli; Michelin; Goodyear; Yokohama

Competition history
- Notable entrants: SMG Compétition; Pescarolo Sport; Courage Compétition
- Debut: 2000 Silverstone 500 USA Challenge
Races	Wins	Poles
49	14	7
- Teams' Championships: 2: (2005 Le Mans Endurance Series season, 2006 Le Mans Series season)
- Constructors' Championships: 2: (2005 Le Mans Endurance Series season, 2006 Le Mans Series season)
- Drivers' Championships: 2: (2005 Le Mans Endurance Series season, 2006 Le Mans Series season)

The Courage C60 was a Le Mans Prototype (LMP) racing car built by Courage Compétition in 2000, and used in international sports car races until 2006. A replacement for the Courage C52, it was Courage's first all-new prototype since the Courage C41 was built in 1994.

It was initially fitted with a 4-litre naturally-aspirated Judd GV4 V10 engine in 2000, and run by SMG Compétition. In 2001, Pescarolo Sport began using a 3.2-litre twin-turbocharged Sodemo-Peugeot A32 V6 engined version of the car, and the Peugeot-engined versions would prove to be the most successful. In 2004, Pescarolo redeveloped the C60 on their own, and replaced the Peugeot engines with 5-litre Judd GV5 V10s. In 2005, Courage ran two updated versions of the C60 (known as the C60 Hybrid, and using the Judd GV4 engines) as a factory effort; Pescarolo also updated their C60s into a similar Hybrid format, and took second at the 2005 and 2006 24 Hours of Le Mans, whilst also winning the Le Mans Series in both years.

In 2006, the all-new Courage LC70 was introduced by Courage, and Pescarolo introduced their 01 in 2007.

== Design and development ==
In 2000, Courage Compétition introduced the C60 as a clean-sheet replacement for the Courage C52. Like its predecessor, the C60 was designed by Paolo Catone, and was the first all-new car since the Courage C41 was introduced. The C60 used a carbon fibre and aluminium honeycomb monocoque chassis, whilst its suspension consisted of double wishbones, pushrods and horizontally-located dynamic dampers. SMG Compétition were the first team to run the car, and their C60 was fitted with a 4-litre naturally-aspirated Judd GV4 V10 engine, In 2001, Pescarolo Sport began using the C60 and their C60s used a Sodemo-developed 3.2-litre twin-turbocharged Peugeot A32 V6 engine, capable of a claimed power output of 550 hp (410 kW; 558 PS). In 2002, André de Cortanze redeveloped the C60 into the C60 Evo, which notably featured an unusual brake duct system similar to that found on an open-wheel racing car at the front of the car, whilst the rear wing endplates were redesigned and the Peugeot A32 engine now produced a claimed output of 580 hp (433 kW; 588 PS). The endplates were further developed in 2003, whilst the engine's air restrictors were decreased in size from 32.4 to 30.7 mm (1.3 to 1.2 in), resulting in the claimed power output decreasing to 510 hp (380 kW; 517 PS). In 2004, Pescarolo began running the car as a "Pescarolo C60" with a 5-litre Judd GV5 V10 engine, as Henri Pescarolo had further developed the C60. For 2005, Courage and Pescarolo both released redeveloped versions of the C60 for the new LMP1 regulations; both were designated as C60 Hybrids and used Judd engines. The Pescarolo version retained its Judd GV5 engine, with a claimed power output of 630 hp (470 kW; 639 PS), whilst the Courage version used the smaller 600 hp (447 kW; 608 PS) Judd GV4 engine, and featured a noticeably different rear wing. Courage introduced the new Catone-designed Courage LC70 in 2006 as the C60's replacement.

== Racing history ==
=== 2000–2001 ===
The C60 made its debut at the 2000 Silverstone 500 USA Challenge, when SMG Compétition's Gary Formato and Philippe Gache used the car to take tenth place, and eighth in the LMP category. For the 24 Hours of Le Mans, Gache and Formato were to be joined by Didier Cottaz, but suspension failure after 219 laps forced the team to retire. SMG ran Cottaz and Gache at the 1000 km of Nürburgring, but an accident after 44 laps lead to the team's retirement.

For 2001, Pescarolo Sport replaced their C52s with the C60. Their first race with the C60 came at the 12 Hours of Sebring, with Jean-Christophe Boullion, Sébastien Bourdais and Laurent Rédon selected to drive the car; however, engine problems after 167 laps forced them to retire, and they were classified 25th overall, and seventh in class. At the 2 Hours 30 Minutes of Catalunya, Boullion and Bourdais completed 57 laps before another engine problem forced them to retire. For the 2 Hours 45 Minutes of Donington Park, Boullion partnered Rédon to fourth place, the fastest of the non-Audi entries. However, oil pump issues struck at the 1000 km of Monza, forcing Boullion, Rédon and Bourdais to retire. Three C60s were entered in the 2001 24 Hours of Le Mans; Pescarolo ran Boullion, Bourdais and Rédon in one car, and Emmanuel Clérico, Cottaz and Boris Derichebourg in another, whilst SMG ran Gache alongside Jérôme Policand and Anthony Beltoise in their C60. Only the Boullion/Bourdais/Rédon C60 finished (in 13th overall, and 4th in the LMP900 category), as the other Pescarolo car crashed out after 42 laps, and SMG's C60 succumbed to engine problems 9 laps later. Pescarolo Sport's next race with the C60 came at the 1000 km Estoril, where Boullion, Rédon and Derichebourg were able to take the car's first ever victory, although they had initially been disqualified for ignoring blue flags; Boullion and Rédon immediately followed this with another victory in their next race, which was the 2 Hours 30 Minutes of Magny-Cours. Boullion and Derichebourg finished the season off with second at the 2 Hours 30 Minutes of Nürburgring. Courage finished the American Le Mans Series (ALMS) season classified in sixth, whilst they took fifth in the FIA Sportscar Championship, and third in the European Le Mans Series (ELMS).

=== 2002–2003 ===
For 2002, Courage Compétition began running a factory team again (using a Judd-engined C60), whilst Pescarolo Sport continued with their Peugeot-engined C60. The 2 Hours 30 Minutes of Catalunya saw Courage's Thed Björk, Derichebourg and Cottaz take fifth overall, whilst Pescarolo's Boullion and Bourdais won the race. At the 2 Hours 30 Minutes of Estoril, it was Cottaz and Derichebourg who took second for Courage, whilst Boullion and Franck Lagorce finished fourth for Pescarolo. At the 2 Hours 30 Minutes of Brno, Cottaz and Derichebourg took another second for Courage, whilst Pescarolo did not compete. Three C60s were entered for the 2002 24 Hours of Le Mans; Courage selected Cottaz, Derichebourg and Björk to drive their car, whilst Pescarolo ran Boullion, Lagorce and Bourdais in one of their C60-Peugeots, and Stéphane Ortelli, Ukyo Katayama and Éric Hélary drove their other car. Although the C60 of Ortelli/Katayama/Hélary succumbed to engine trouble after 144 laps, the other Pescarolo-entered C60 finished tenth overall, and ninth in class whilst the Courage-entered C60 finished 15th overall, and 11th in class. Pescarolo reverted to a single-car entry for the 2 Hours 30 Minutes of Magny-Cours, which, with Bourdais and Boullion at the wheel, finished in second; the Courage-entered car, driven by Cottaz and Derichebourg, succumbed to electrical issues before completing a lap. Courage did not run their car again, whilst Pescarolo's Boullion and Lagorce took third at the 2 Hours 30 Minutes of Dijon, before Bourdais and Boullion finished the season with a victory at the 2 Hours 30 Minutes of Spa. Courage finished the season tied with Dome on 97 points in the SR1 Constructor's Championship, but lost the title to Dome as they had won a single race less.

Pescarolo started the 2003 FIA Sportscar Championship season with a victory at the 2 Hours 30 Minutes of Estoril, with Boullion partnering Stéphane Sarrazin in the C60. Like the previous year, three C60s were entered at the 24 Hours of Le Mans; Courage ran Jonathan Cochet, Jean-Marc Gounon and Stéphan Grégoire in their car, whilst Pescarolo ran Boullion, Sarrazin and Lagorce in one car, with Nicolas Minassian, Soheil Ayari and Hélary in the other. The three C60s finished seventh, eighth and ninth respectively, which equated to fifth, sixth and seventh in the LMP900 category. Pescarolo followed this result with a string of retirements at the 500 km of Monza, the 2 Hours 30 Minutes of Oschersleben and the 2 Hours 30 Minutes of Donington. The 1000 km of Spa saw a return to form, as Sarrazin and Lagorce took second, before Pescarolo ended the FIA Sportscar Championship season with a victory at the 2 Hours 30 Minutes of Nogaro (where Ayari replaced Sarrazin). Despite the mid-season slump, Pescarolo were still able to deliver Courage second in the SR1 Constructor's Championship. The final race of the C60's season came at the non-championship 1000 km of Le Mans, where Sarrazin, Lagorce and Bourdais took second place.

=== 2004–2005 ===
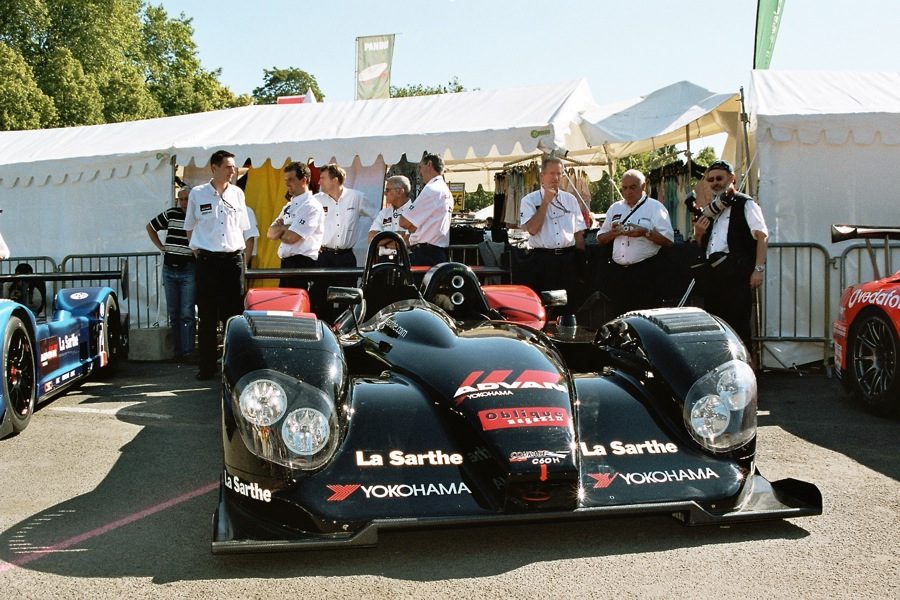
Courage Compétition's No. 13 C60 at the 2005 24 Hours of Le Mans.

In 2004, Pescarolo Sport were the only team to use the C60, which they ran as the "Pescarolo C60". The team's first race came in the 1000 km of Monza, which formed part of the new Le Mans Endurance Series (LMES); here, Ayari and Emmanuel Collard took fourth overall, and were the fastest of the non-Audi entrants. For the 24 Hours of Le Mans, Collard partnered Bourdais and Minassian in one C60, whilst Ayari drove with Érik Comas and Benoît Tréluyer in the other. Although the C60 of Collard, Bourdais and Minassian succumbed to engine trouble after 282 laps, the Ayari/Comas/Tréluyer finished fourth overall, and fastest of the non-Audi runners once more. Hélary was selected to partner Ayari at the 1000 km of Nürburgring, and this time the pair brought the C60 home in fifth overall. Pescarolo's last race of the season came at the 1000 km of Spa, where Gounon and Ayari lasted nine laps before being forced to retire due to accident damage. Pescarolo finished the LMES season in fifth place, level on points with Team Jota.

In 2005, Courage Compétition began running their updated C60 Hybrid, whilst Pescarolo also updated their C60; the two teams were the fastest and second fastest respectively at the Paul Ricard test session. At the LMES season opener, which was the 1000 km of Spa, the Courage-entered car, driven by Cochet, Christian Vann and Alexander Frei was eliminated in a pit-lane accident, whilst the Pescarolo entry, driven by Bouillon, Collard and Comas finished second. For the 24 Hours of Le Mans, both teams entered two cars; Courage entered Frei, Vann and Dominik Schwager in one car, and Cochet, Shinji Nakano and Bruce Jouanny in the other, whilst Pescarolo ran Collard, Boullion and Comas in one of their C60s, with Ayari, Hélary and Sébastien Loeb in the other. One car from each team finished; Collard, Boullion and Comas took second for Pescarolo, whilst Schwager, Frei and Vann finished eighth for Courage. Both teams reverted to single-car entries for the 1000 km of Monza, which Collard and Boullion won for Pescarolo; the Gounon/Vann/Frei combination in the Courage finished sixth overall, and fourth in the LMP1 category. For the 1000 km of Silverstone, it was Frei, Vann and Cochet, driving for Courage, who were the fastest C60; they took 14th, and 13th in class, whilst Collard and Boullion had problems and finished 34th, and 17th in class. The 1000 km of Nürburgring saw Boullion and Collard take fourth for Pescarolo, whilst Frei and Cochet took eighth for Courage. At the final round of the season, which was the 1000 km of Istanbul, Collard and Boullion took another victory for Pescarolo, whilst the Courage of Gounon and Frei took 21st overall, and eighth in class. This result meant that Pescarolo had won their first ever team's championship, whilst Courage finished seventh.

=== 2006 ===
For 2006, Pescarolo were the only team to run the C60 in the newly-renamed Le Mans Series (LMS). Collard and Boullion started the season in exactly the same way they had finished the previous one, by winning the 1000 km of Istanbul in the Pescarolo C60 Hybrid. The 1000 km of Spa saw Collard and Boullion win again, despite starting the race from the pitlane after a crash in free practice. At the 24 Hours of Le Mans, Pescarolo entered two C60s, as usual; one driven by Hélary, Loeb and Franck Montagny, whilst the other was driven by Collard, Minassian and Comas. The Montagny/Hélary/Loeb car took second overall, beating one of the brand-new Audi R10 TDIs, whilst the other car finished fifth overall, and fourth in the LMP1 category. Having returned to the LMS, Collard and Boullion were joined by Hélary for the 1000 km of Nürburgring, and the trio took another win for Pescarolo. Didier André replaced Hélary in the final two rounds, which were the 1000 km of Donington and 1000 km of Jarama, and Pescarolo won both races to complete a clean sweep. As a result, Pescarolo retained the LMP1 team's championship with the maximum score possible. The C60 was made obsolete by the new LMP1 regulations for 2007, and thus was retired, and replaced by the Pescarolo 01.
