= Menard V12 engine =

Reciprocating internal combustion engine

Menard MCT V12 engine

Overview
- Manufacturer: Menard
- Production: 2009–2011

Layout
- Configuration: 60° V12
- Displacement: 4,198 cc (256.2 cu in)
- Cylinder bore: 93 mm (3.66 in)
- Piston stroke: 51.5 mm (2.03 in)
- Valvetrain: DOHC, four-valves per cylinder

RPM range
- Max. engine speed: 12,000 rpm

Combustion
- Fuel system: Direct fuel injection
- Oil system: Dry sump

Output
- Power output: 750 hp (559 kW)
- Torque output: 376 lb⋅ft (510 N⋅m)

Dimensions
- Dry weight: 140 kg (309 lb)

The Menard V12 engine is a V12 racing engine designed, developed, and produced by Menard Competition Technologies (MCT) in partnership and collaboration with Élan Motorsport Technologies. It was specially made for the Panoz DP09 Superleague Formula open-wheel race car.

== Engine design ==
The engine was produced by MCT, and is a naturally aspirated 60° 4.2-liter V12. It was able to produce 750 hp (559 kW) at 11,750 rpm and rev up to 12,000 rpm, with a maximum torque of 510 N⋅m (376 lb⋅ft).

=== Engine details ===
- Number of Cylinders: 12
- Capacity: 4,198 cc (256.2 cu in)
- Configuration: 60° Vee
- Weight: 140 kg (308.6 lb) Dry
- Peak power: 750 bhp (559.3 kW) at 11,750 rpm
- Maximum RPM: 12,000
- Peak torque: 510 N⋅m (376.2 lb⋅ft) at 9,500–10,500 rpm

== Applications ==
- Panoz DP09
- Bloodhound SSC — First-stage engine and fuel pump drive.
