= GTR Euroseries =

The GTR Euroseries was a short-lived auto racing series which ran in 1998. It was created as an alternative to the international FIA GT Championship, while combining elements of the former BPR Global GT Series. The GTR Euroseries was created by Patrick Peter and the GTR Organisation, who had also been a founder of the BPR.

== Development ==
Following the 1996 BPR Global GT Series season, the FIA chose to promote the championship to a more international status and revamp the series into the FIA GT Championship. This was due to the increased amount of manufacturer support from the series, with makes including Mercedes-Benz, Porsche, Lotus, Panoz, and Chrysler. This increase in manufacturer input escalated the cost of being competitive in the series, driving various privateer teams out of the Championship.

At the same time, the FIA began to shorten events in the schedule. While most races in 1997 remained at four hours as they had been during BPR, others were shortened to just three hours. This was further revamped in 1998 as all events, besides the Suzuka 1000km, were run for only 500 kilometers, averaging under three hours per race.

Believing that the FIA GT Championship was moving away from the BPR Global GT Series' ideals for grand tourer racing, the Peter Organisation chose to create a new championship in 1998 as an alternative to FIA GT. This series would return to some of the concepts of BPR, such as all events being four hours in length. The series would also have a ban on direct manufacturer input, leaving the series open to small private teams who could not easily compete in the high-cost FIA GT series.

The new GTR Euroseries would also bring back some of the class structure that had been used in BPR. Besides allowing the GT1 and GT2 classes from FIA GT, the GT3 and GT4 classes also returned. These classes would be composed of cars from one-make series, such as the Porsche Supercup, Ferrari Challenge, or Venturi Trophy. Because these cars were much closer to their street legal counterparts, they were an even cheaper alternative to the GT1 and GT2 classes.

== 1998 season ==
The first round of the season in Jarama had twenty competitors appearing, with at least two cars in each class. The first race was easily won by a GT1 class competitor, Thomas Bscher, using a McLaren F1 GTR, a car which still competed in FIA GT Championship. However, the next round at Paul Ricard would not feature the McLaren, and instead the GT1 class was left with only a Porsche 911 GT2 Evo. GT2 class was the most prevalent, with nine competitors, while the GT4 class also had a variety of machines.

By the third round of the season, the series mostly became a competition with the GT2 and GT4 classes, of which most of the competitors used Porsches. A mere 12 entrants showed at Misano, while only ten arrived at the Nürburgring. The series saw some revival in its final round of the season at Spa-Francorchamps, as 19 cars were entered, but the field still consisted mostly of GT2 and GT4 teams.

During the 1998 season, the FIA GT Championship announced their plans to eliminate their GT1 class due to the high cost of the machines which ran it and the dominance of Mercedes-Benz in the Championship. This left only the smaller GT2 class, of which only Chrysler ran a factory squad. Believing the smaller FIA GT Championship would be more open to privateer teams in 1999 and due to a lack of competitors during the 1998 season, the GTR Euroseries was cancelled after five rounds due to a lack of teams entering and no desire to run a separate series in 1999.

=== Results ===
All races were four hours in length. The Misano Gold Cup allowed sports-prototypes to compete alongside the GT cars.

Rnd	Race	Circuit	Overall Winning Team	Date
Rnd	Race	Circuit	Overall Winning Drivers	Date
1	(Spain) Gran Premio Repsol	Circuito Permanente Del Jarama	(United Kingdom) #1 GTC/Davidoff Classic	March 22
1	(Spain) Gran Premio Repsol	Circuito Permanente Del Jarama	(United Kingdom) Geoff Lees (Germany) Thomas Bscher	March 22
2	(France) 4 Hours of Paul Ricard	Circuit Paul Ricard	(United Kingdom) #9 BVB Motorsport	April 26
2	(France) 4 Hours of Paul Ricard	Circuit Paul Ricard	(United Kingdom) Geoff Lister (United Kingdom) Maxwell Beaverbrook (United Kingdom) Barrie Williams	April 26
3	(Italy) Misano Gold Cup	Misano Circuit	(Belgium) #33 GLPK Racing	May 24
3	(Italy) Misano Gold Cup	Misano Circuit	(Belgium) Paul Kumpen (Belgium) Stéphane Cohen (Switzerland) Charles Margueron	May 24
4	(Germany) Intl. ACV-AvD Sprint Meeting	Nürburgring	(Germany) #35 Freisinger Motorsport	July 19
4	(Germany) Intl. ACV-AvD Sprint Meeting	Nürburgring	(Germany) Wolfgang Kaufmann (France) Michel Ligonnet	July 19
5	(Belgium) 4 Hours of Spa	Circuit de Spa-Francorchamps	(Germany) #35 Freisinger Motorsport	July 26
5	(Belgium) 4 Hours of Spa	Circuit de Spa-Francorchamps	(Germany) Wolfgang Kaufmann (France) Michel Ligonnet	July 26
