= FIA GT Championship =

Auto racing championship in Europe

- The FIA GT Championship logo.
- Category: Gran Turismo
- Country: International
- Inaugural season: 1997
- Folded: 2009
- Last Drivers' champion: GT1: Michael Bartels, Andrea Bertolini; GT2: Richard Westbrook
- Last Makes' champion: GT2: Ferrari
- Last Teams' champion: GT1: Vitaphone Racing Team; GT2: AF Corse

The FIA GT Championship was a sports car racing series organized by the Stéphane Ratel Organisation (SRO) at the behest of the Fédération Internationale de l'Automobile (FIA). The championship was mostly concentrated in Europe, but throughout the years has visited other continents including Asia and South America. At the end of 2009, the championship was replaced by the FIA GT1 World Championship, which morphed into the FIA GT Series for 2013.

== Regulations ==
FIA currently defines several categories of GT cars with the top two specifications being GT1, or Grand Touring Cars, and GT2, or Series Grand Touring Cars. Each category has an annual driver champion, team champion, and manufacturer champion. Both categories are based on production road car designs, which must be produced in a minimum quantity of 25 examples to qualify. Both types may undergo significant modifications from the road car they are based on, but GT1 allows the use of exotic materials, better aerodynamics, larger brakes, wider tyres and larger engine admission restrictors.

For the 2006 season, the FIA created a new class called GT3. GT3 cars are even closer to their production counterparts and are very simply racetrack prepared with the essentials (rollcages for safety, stripped interiors, race spec fuel tanks, etc.). All cars are performance balanced together via different weights, restrictors, tyre pressures etc. Prestigious motorsports makes such as Aston Martin, Chevrolet, Dodge, Lamborghini, Ascari and Maserati take part in FIA GT3 European Championship, a support series in some rounds of the main championship.

The FIA defines a GT car as "an open or closed automobile which has no more than one door on each side and a minimum of two seats situated one on each side of the longitudinal centre line of the car; these two seats must be crossed by the same transversal plane. This car must be able to be used perfectly legally on the open road, and adapted for racing on circuits or closed courses."

All races in the FIA GT Championship were of endurance type, a full race distance lasting a minimum of 500 km or a maximum of three hours, with the exception of the Spa 24 Hours, Istanbul 2 hours and the exhibition Mil Milhas Brasileiras, which is run over a 1,000 m (1.0 km) and was planned to be a round of the championship in 2007. However, with the release of the 2007 FIA GT Championship schedule and rules, the FIA GT series becomes more of a sprint race event, with all races being a maximum of 2 hours with the exception of the Spa 24 Hours.

== History ==
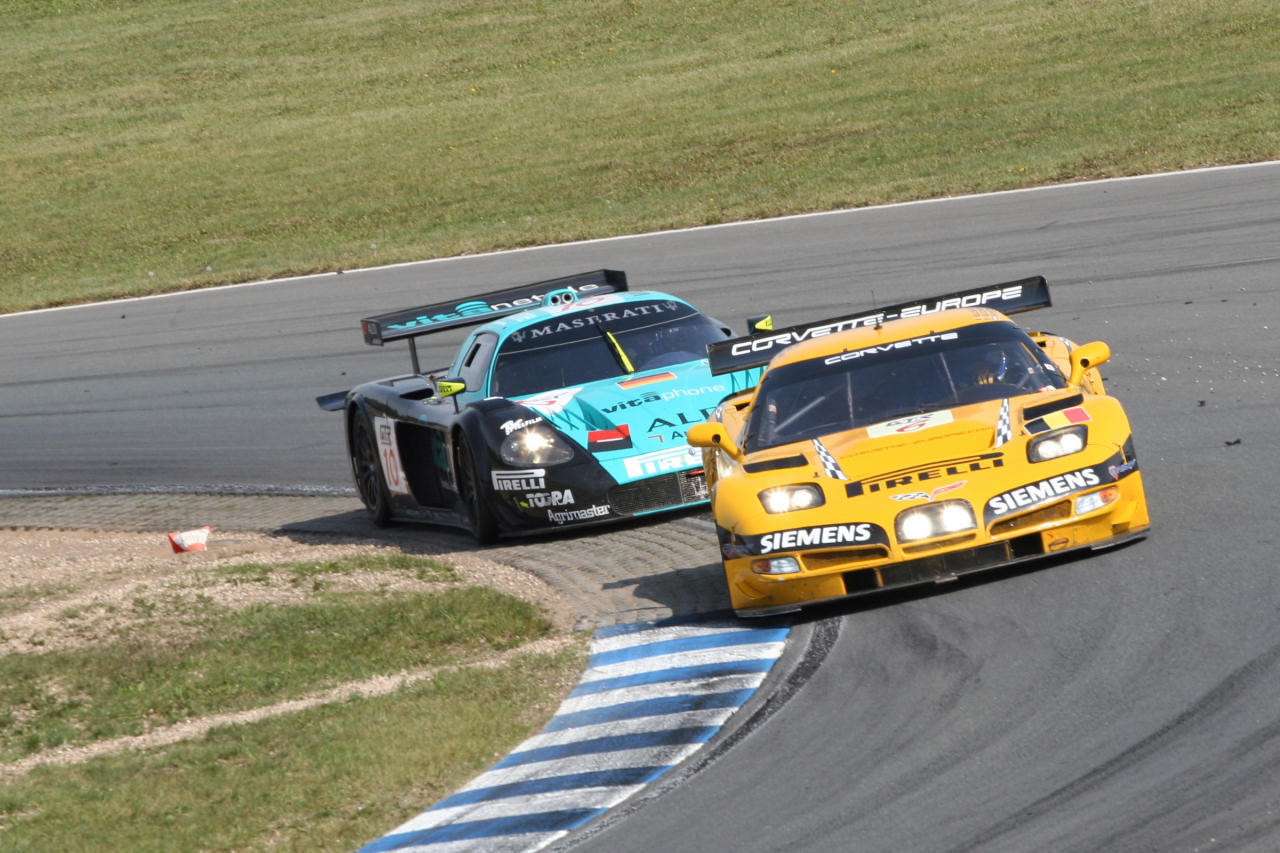
A Maserati MC12 competing against a Chevrolet Corvette C5-R

In 1997, due to increasing interest from manufacturers such as Mercedes-Benz, Porsche and Panoz, the FIA took over control of the expanding BPR Global GT Series, standardizing the race-length at 500 km instead of the usual four hours, liberalizing the technical regulations and leaving commercial exploitation in the hands of one of BPR's founders, Stéphane Ratel, who managed to get TV support from the pan-European TV station Eurosport. The new manufacturers built "homologation specials", racing-bred cars that took full advantage of the new rules, to build quasi-prototypes with very limited production runs of 25 cars. Chrysler, Lister and Marcos, not wanting to accompany the cost escalation, moved down to the GT2 class.

Mercedes completely dominated the new category and the other manufacturers pulled out after the end of the 1998 season. This left Chrysler's Viper to become the dominating car in the series, with the aging Porsche 993 GT2 and the Lister Storm providing a certain degree of competition.

However, there was no lower inexpensive category for amateur drivers, and this led to the creation of the N-GT class in 2000. While the manufacturer field in the main class blossomed, the new category became swamped with Porsches and Ferraris, but lower running costs meant both classes enjoyed a balanced number of entries. In order to boost the championship's status, the SRO added the 24 Hours of Spa, previously a touring car race, to the calendar, where it became the series' most important race. The FIA also banned official manufacturer involvement, although certain teams had preferential treatment, with Porsche establishing a "round robin" system.

After the end of the 2004 season, the FIA renamed the classes GT1 and GT2, and somewhat liberalized the GT1 regulations, allowing "supercars". While this was made to accommodate the Saleen S7, the biggest beneficiary was the purpose-built Maserati MC12, which led the FIA to impose aerodynamic limitations on the Italian car. However, thanks to a weight penalty system, the fight for the championship is protected from more domineering cars. The level of competition remains tight, with gentlemen drivers managing to fight for the wins with professional drivers, some of them with Formula One experience.

Following the 2009 season, the SRO announced that the FIA GT Championship's two categories, GT1 and GT2, would break off into separate series. The GT1 category became a world championship with rounds across the world. Cars which fit the GT1 class were eligible to race only in the FIA GT1 World Championship, as the ACO (organizer of the Le Mans 24 Hours) banned the cars from the event and all of its associated series for 2011. This meant that the category that once was eligible to race not only in the FIA GT, Le Mans Series and numerous national championships, was now only able to run in the new World Championship in 2011. A few GT1 were entered in the LMGT1 class at the 2010 Le Mans Series and 2010 24 Hours of Le Mans.

The GT1 cars continued to race in the World Championship in 2010 and 2011, but in 2012 the series switched exclusively to GT3 machinery due to shrinking car counts and the fact that most of the cars were ageing and no one was willing to build new models. This meant that the San Luis round of the 2011 season was the last time GT1 cars contested in international motorsport. The 2012 FIA GT1 season was contested with GT3 cars (yet retaining GT1 in series' title), but the series was finally cancelled after the year had concluded, being replaced by the FIA GT Series.

In 2010 the GT2 class was planned to have a separate championship having rounds held only in Europe, known as the FIA GT2 European Championship, but this series was cancelled. A lone GT2 event was held in 2010 at the Spa 24 Hours with the winners being awarded the FIA GT2 European Cup. This was the last time GT2-spec cars contested in SRO-sanctioned series.

A new Blancpain Endurance Series was announced for 2011 which re-established some of the endurance format of the former FIA GT Championship, although this series only utilised the FIA's GT3, GT4, and Supersports categories (GT2 was also planned to be in the series, but this was quickly folded as the interest level wasn't high). However, this series is not an FIA-sanctioned championship. In 2012 the series abandoned the GT4 class and moved to GT3 exclusively.

== Champions ==
As of the end of the 2009 season, Vitaphone Racing Team have won their fifth consecutive Teams' Championship in the GT1 category, while AF Corse earned their fourth consecutive title. Michael Bartels and Andrea Bertolini, both driving for Vitaphone, earned their third Drivers' Championship titles in the past four seasons. Richard Westbrook of Prospeed Competition won the GT2 Drivers' Championship. Chris Niarchos won the Citation Cup while Ferrari won the returning Manufacturers' Championship for the GT2 category.

== See also ==
- FIA GT1 World Championship
- FIA GT3 European Championship
- GT4 European Cup
- Blancpain Endurance Series
- GTR Euroseries
