= Courage C41 =

Sports prototype designed and built by Courage Compétition

Courage C41/C50/C51/C52
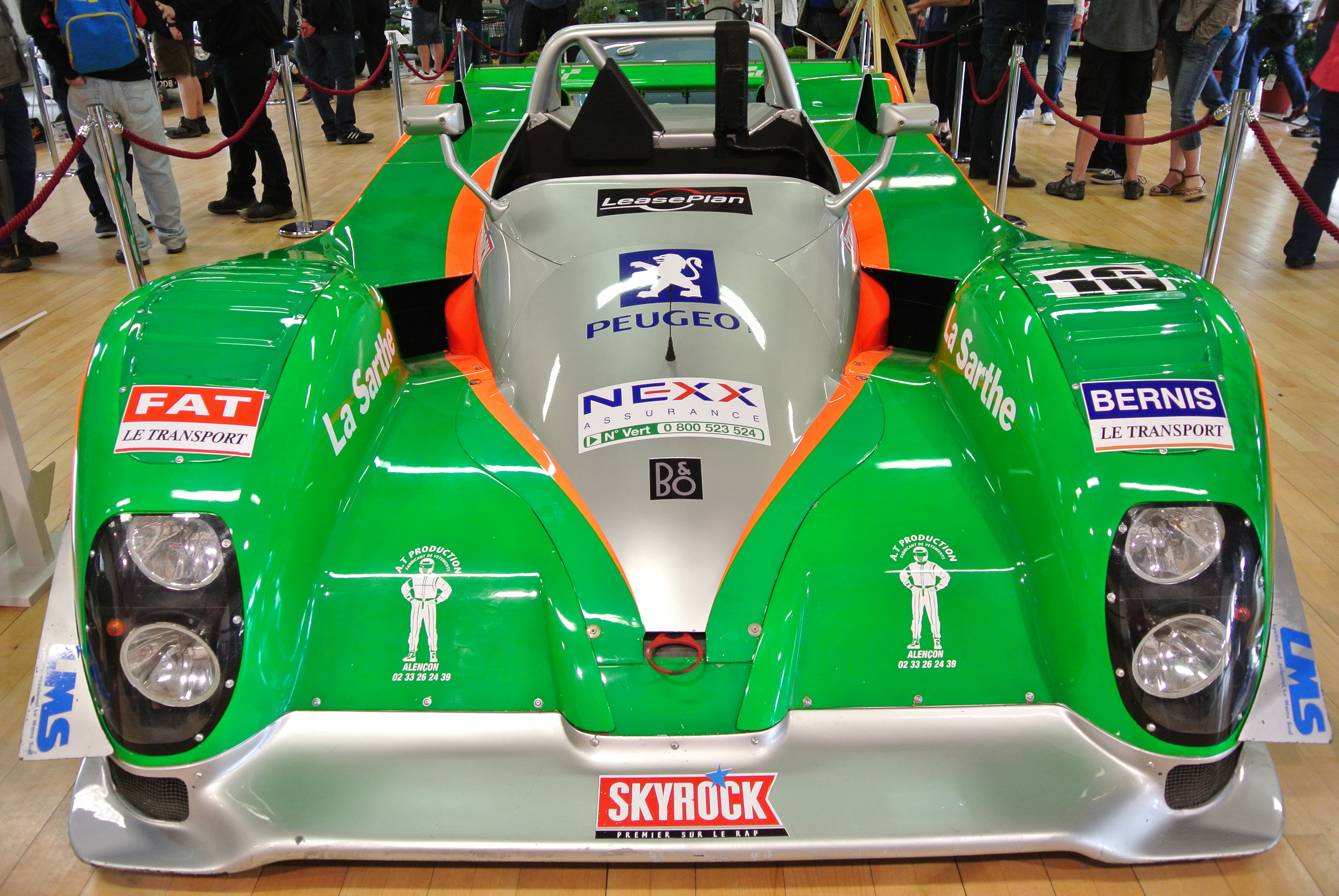
- Category: World Sports Car/LMP
- Constructor: Courage Compétition
- Designer(s): Paolo Catone
- Predecessor: Courage C36
- Successor: Courage C60

Technical specifications
- Chassis: carbon fibre and aluminium honeycomb monocoque
- Suspension (front): Fabricated steel double wishbones pushrod-operated dampers with coil springs
- Suspension (rear): Fabricated steel double wishbones pushrod-operated dampers with coil springs
- Length: 4,635 mm (182.5 in)
- Width: 2,000 mm (78.7 in)
- Height: 1,020 mm (40.2 in)
- Axle track: Front: 1,628 mm (64.1 in); Rear: 1,560 mm (61.4 in)
- Wheelbase: 2,812 mm (110.7 in)
- Engine: Comptech-Chevrolet 5,000 cc (305.1 cu in) 16 valve, OHV V8, naturally aspirated, mid-mounted, rear wheel drive Oldsmobile V8; Porsche 935 2,994 cc (182.7 cu in) 12 valve, SOHC F6, twin-turbocharged Nissan VRH35Z 3,000–3,496 cc (183.1–213.3 cu in) 32 valve, DOHC V8, twin-turbocharged Nissan VRH35L 3,496 cc (213.3 cu in) 32 valve, DOHC V8, twin-turbocharged Sodemo-Peugeot A32 3,199 cc (195.2 cu in) 24 valve, DOHC V6, twin-turbocharged
- Transmission: Intermotion FDC 5-speed Porsche 5-speed Hewland L 6-speed sequential manual
- Weight: 841–900 kg (1,854–1,984 lb)
- Tyres: Goodyear; Michelin; Pirelli

Competition history
- Notable entrants: Courage Compétition; Wheel Works Racing; Equipe Promotion Racing; Pescarolo Sport; Nissan Motorsports
- Debut: C41: 1995 24 Hours of Le Mans; C51: 1998 24 Hours of Le Mans; C50: 1999 24 Hours of Le Mans; C52: 1999 24 Hours of Le Mans
Races	Wins	Poles
C41: 26; C50: 1 C51: 1 C52: 3	C41: 2 C50: 0 C51: 0 C52: 0	C41: 2 C50: 0 C51: 0 C52: 0
- Teams' Championships: 0
- Constructors' Championships: 0
- Drivers' Championships: 0

The Courage C41 was a sports prototype racing car built by Courage Compétition in 1994, and used in international sports car races from 1995 until 1999. Designed by Paolo Catone, it initially used a 5-litre Chevrolet V8 engine, developed by Comptech, and later used the 3-litre twin-turbocharged flat-six engine from a Porsche 935, as well as an Oldsmobile V8. In 1998, two of the C41s were developed into the Courage C51, which used a 3-litre twin-turbocharged Nissan VRH35Z V8 engine, and was used in that year's 24 Hours of Le Mans. In 1999, the C41s were mostly converted to the C52 specification (although one retained its Porsche 935 flat six, and was developed into the C50, while another was entered as a Chevrolet C41 in two events); this initially used a 3.5-litre twin-turbocharged Nissan VRH35L V8, which was then replaced by a 3.2-litre twin-turbocharged Peugeot A32 V6 engine for 2000. In 2000, the C41 line was replaced by the new C60.

== Design and development ==
In 1994, Yves Courage decided to build a World Sports Car for the IMSA GT Championship, which was the Paolo Catone-designed C41. Although the C41 was entirely designed by Catone, Marcel Hubert had initially developed a long-tailed concept model for the car, but this design was scrapped after Hubert retired. Catone began to design the car, on a limited budget, in early 1994, and completed it in July 1994. The C41 used a carbon fibre and aluminium honeycomb monocoque chassis, with a rear shear plate designed to allow the usage of multiple different types of engine. The first C41 was built in October 1994, and it was fitted with a Comptech-developed 5-litre Chevrolet V8 engine, which, in 1995 24 Hours of Le Mans trim, was claimed to produce around 560 hp (418 kW; 568 PS). The power was transmitted to the rear wheels via a 5-speed Intermotion SDC gearbox, whilst Brembo brakes were used to slow the 17 in (432 mm) BBS wheels. KONI developed the suspension, which consisted of double wishbones made out of fabricated steel, and pushrod-operated dampers with coil springs.

The Chevrolet engine remained the primary engine for the 1995 and the start of the 1996 IMSA GT Championship seasons, but by the middle of 1996, different engines began to be fitted. Scott Schubot fitted an Oldsmobile engine to his C41 partway through the 1996 season, whilst a 3-litre twin-turbocharged Porsche 935 flat-six engine was fitted by Courage for the 1997 24 Hours of Le Mans.

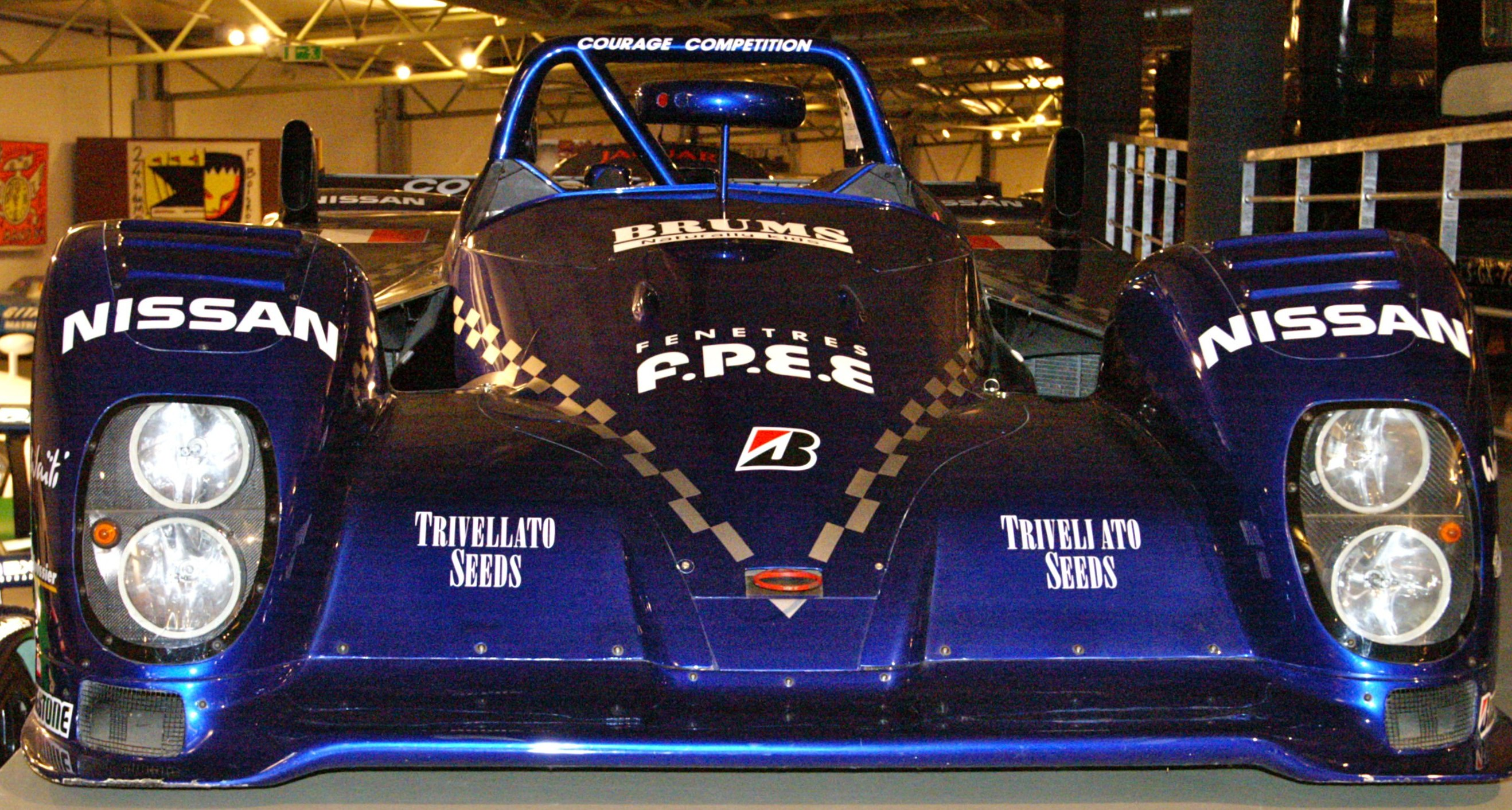
The Nissan-engined Courage C52 that finished sixth at the 1999 24 Hours of Le Mans.

In 1998, two C41s were developed into the C51 specification for that year's 24 Hours of Le Mans; one of the C51s used a 3-litre twin-turbocharged Nissan VRH35Z V8 engine derived from a Nissan Group C car, whilst the other used a 3.5-litre version of the same engine. The C51 was then further developed into the C52 for the 1999 24 Hours of Le Mans, and the VRH35Z was replaced with a 3.5-litre Nissan VRH35L engine. For this race, another C41 was converted to the C51 specification, although this retained its Porsche 935 flat-six; this C51 is also referred to as the C50. The final development of the C41 line came in 2000, when the C52s were fitted with the Sodemo-developed 3.2-litre twin-turbocharged Peugeot A32 V6 engine, producing a claimed output of 550 hp (410 kW; 558 PS). In 2000, the new Courage C60 was introduced as the C52's replacement, bringing to an end the C41 line.

== Racing history ==
=== 1995–1996 ===
The Courage C41 made its first appearance at the 1995 24 Hours of Le Mans, with Courage Compétition selecting Henri Pescarolo, Franck Lagorce and Éric Bernard to drive it. A second C41, driven by Eric van de Poele, Olivier Beretta and Matjaz Tomlje, was also entered, but was disqualified for technical infringements for the event. The C41 of Pescarolo, Lagorce and Bernard lasted 26 laps before succumbing to electrical problems, and retiring.

Following this race, two C41s were shipped to America for use in the IMSA GT Championship in 1996. Wheel Works Racing took one of the C41s, and selected Rick Sutherland, Jean-Paul Libert, and Steve Fossett to drive at the 24 Hours of Daytona. van de Poele joined the trio for the race, but the C41 was forced to retire due to accident damage after 209 laps, restricting them to 49th place. For the 12 Hours of Sebring, van de Poele left the team and switched to Doyle Racing; Dean Hall was selected to replace him. In addition to this, Scott Schubot entered himself and Jérôme Policand in his privately entered C41. The Wheel Works Racing C41 was forced to retire due to accident damage after 56 laps, whilst Schubot's car retired for the same reason after 239 laps; the two teams were classified 53rd and 30th respectively. Wheel Works Racing did not compete with the C41 again, leaving Schubot as the only C41 entrant at the Grand Prix of Atlanta; he took sixth overall in the race, six laps behind the leader. At the Exxon Superflo 500, Schubot crashed the C41 in practice, and drove Support Net Racing's Hawk C-8 instead in the race. He returned to the C41 for the Lime Rock Grand Prix, with the car now using an Oldsmobile engine; he finished the race in 14th place overall, and 11th in the World Sports Car class. At the California Grand Prix, Schubot finished in seventh place, before taking 14th overall, and ninth in class, at the Grand Prix of Dallas. At the Daytona Finale, Schubot's C41 overheated prior to the start of the race, resulting in him driving for Doyle Racing in the race.

=== 1997–1998 ===
In 1997, Courage Compétition began running the C41 in the IMSA GT Championship, doing so for the first time at the 24 Hours of Daytona. It would not be a successful event, as the C41, driven by Policand, Didier Cottaz and Fredrik Ekblom, succumbed to engine trouble after 12 laps, restricting them to 80th place. At the Grand Prix of Atlanta, Schubot was the sole C41 entrant, running Policand, Martin Guimont and Jacek Mucha in his C41, but the team could only manage 51 laps, and finished 18th, and last, overall. Schubot partnered Mucha in the next round, which was the Lime Rock Grand Prix, and the pair competed 91 laps before gearbox problems struck, and were classified 11th. At the 6 Hours of Watkins Glen, Schubot drove alongside Mucha and Guimont, but mechanical issues forced them to retire after 28 laps, and restricted them to 41st. Courage Compétition then entered a C41 in the 24 Hours of Le Mans; the car, driven by Cottaz, Policand and Marc Goossens, finished fourth overall, having completed 336 laps, and second in the LMP category. The team then entered the C41 in the International Sports Racing Series, and at the 1 Hour 15 Minutes of Zolder, Policand and Cottaz took second overall, ahead of a pair of Courage C36s. At the Mosport Festival (part of the IMSA GT Championship), Mucha and Guimont finished the race in tenth, before Mucha and Field took eighth in the Grand Prix of Las Vegas. In the non-championship 4 Hours of Le Mans, Cottaz and Policand won both races, and thus took the overall victory by three laps. Courage then returned to the IMSA GT Championship, and the pairing of Mucha and Guimont saw mechanical issues restrict them to 102 laps and 14th place at the Festival of Road Racing, before Field and Mucha took ninth at the 2 Hours of Sebring. Field and Mucha finished the IMSA GT Championship season with a 14th finish at the Monterey Sports Car Championships, before Cottaz and Policand finished the International Sports Racing Series season with a victory at the 2 Hours of Jarama.

In 1998, Courage entered three C41-based cars in the 24 Hours of Le Mans; one C41, driven by Franck Fréon, Olivier Thévenin and Yojiro Terada, and two C51s, with Cottaz and Goossens partnering Jean-Philippe Belloc in one, and Fredrik Ekblom, Patrice Gay and Takeshi Tsuchiya driving the other. The C41 finished in 15th, having completed 304 laps, whilst the Cottaz/Belloc/Goossens C51 retired due to an issue with its gear lever after 232 laps, and the other C51 succumbed to a water leak after 126 laps. Equipe Promotion Racing then ran a C41 in the International Sports Racing Series, entering Geoff Farmer and John Burton in the RAC Tourist Trophy; they took tenth overall, and seventh in the SR1 category. At the Coupes d'Automne, Equipe Promotion Racing selected Didier André and Franck Fréon to drive the C41, and they took fourth overall.

=== 1999–2000 ===
Jacobs Motorsport Ltd. attempted to run Mucha, Michael Jacobs and Frank Del Vecchio in a C41 at the Lime Rock Grand Prix round of the United States Road Racing Championship in 1999, but were unable to start the race. At the 24 Hours of Le Mans, three C41-based cars were entered by three different teams. Pescarolo Promotion Racing Team entered Gay, Pescarolo and Michel Ferté in the C50, Courage Compétition selected Alex Caffi, Andrea Montermini and Domenico Schiattarella to drive a C52, and Nissan Motorsports ran Ekblom, Cottaz and Goossens in a second C52. The Courage Compétition entry completed 343 laps, and took sixth, whilst the Nissan Motorsports entry took eighth, with 335 laps, and the Pescarolo entry finished ninth, having completed 328 laps.

Pescarolo Sport used their C52, refitted with the Peugeot A32 engine, in the American Le Mans Series in 2000; in their first race in the series, Emmanuel Clérico, Olivier Grouillard and Sébastien Bourdais took seventh place, three places ahead of the new Courage C60. For the 24 Hours of Le Mans, they named an unchanged driver lineup, and took fourth place in the race – the fastest of the non-Audi entries. This would prove to be the last time a Courage C41-based car was used in a major race.
