= Panoz DP01 =

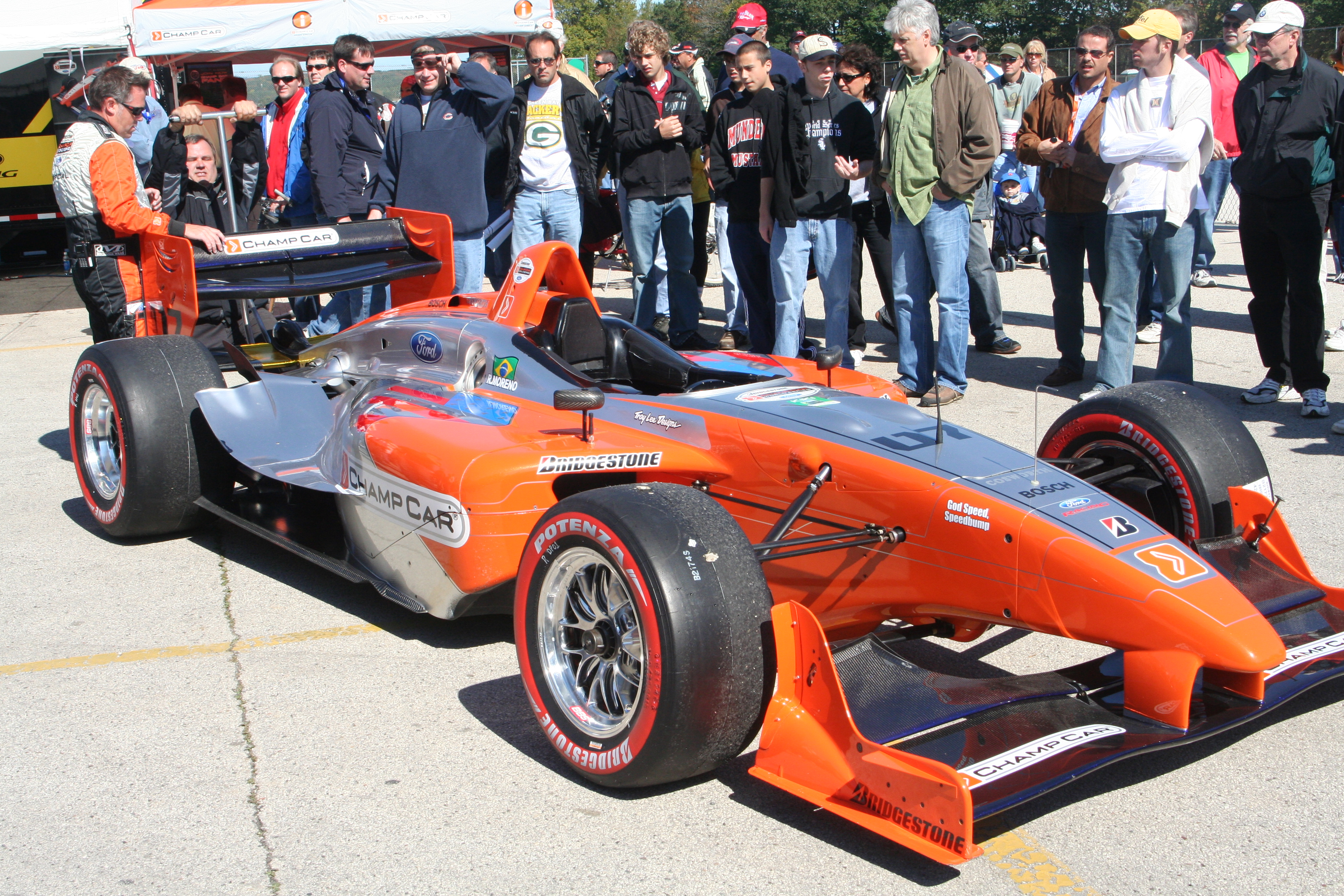
- Category: Champ Car World Series
- Constructor: Panoz/Elan Technologies
- Designers: Simon Marshall & Nick Alcock

Technical specifications
- Chassis: Carbon Fiber monocoque
- Length: 190 in
- Width: 78 in
- Wheelbase: 123 in
- Engine: Cosworth XFE 2,650 cc (162 cu in) V8 Turbocharged Mid-engined, longitudinally mounted
- Transmission: 7-speed semi-automatic sequential w/paddle-shift
- Fuel: Methanol
- Lubricants: Roshfrans
- Tires: Bridgestone

Competition history
- Notable entrants: all 2007 Champ Car teams
- Notable drivers: all 2007 Champ Car drivers
- Debut: 2007 Vegas Grand Prix, Las Vegas, Nevada
Races	Wins	Poles	F/Laps
15	15	15	15

The Panoz DP01 is an open-wheel race car that was produced by Élan Motorsport Technologies at Braselton, Georgia, United States. It was developed for use in the 2007 Champ Car World Series season, replacing the aging de facto-spec Lola chassis. The DP01 was introduced to the world at the 2006 Grand Prix of San Jose on July 28, 2006. Due to the February 2008 sale of Champ Car to the Indy Racing League, which uses its own spec equipment, the car is not currently used in a professional racing series in the United States. The final race for the car was the 2008 Grand Prix of Long Beach.

== Development concepts ==
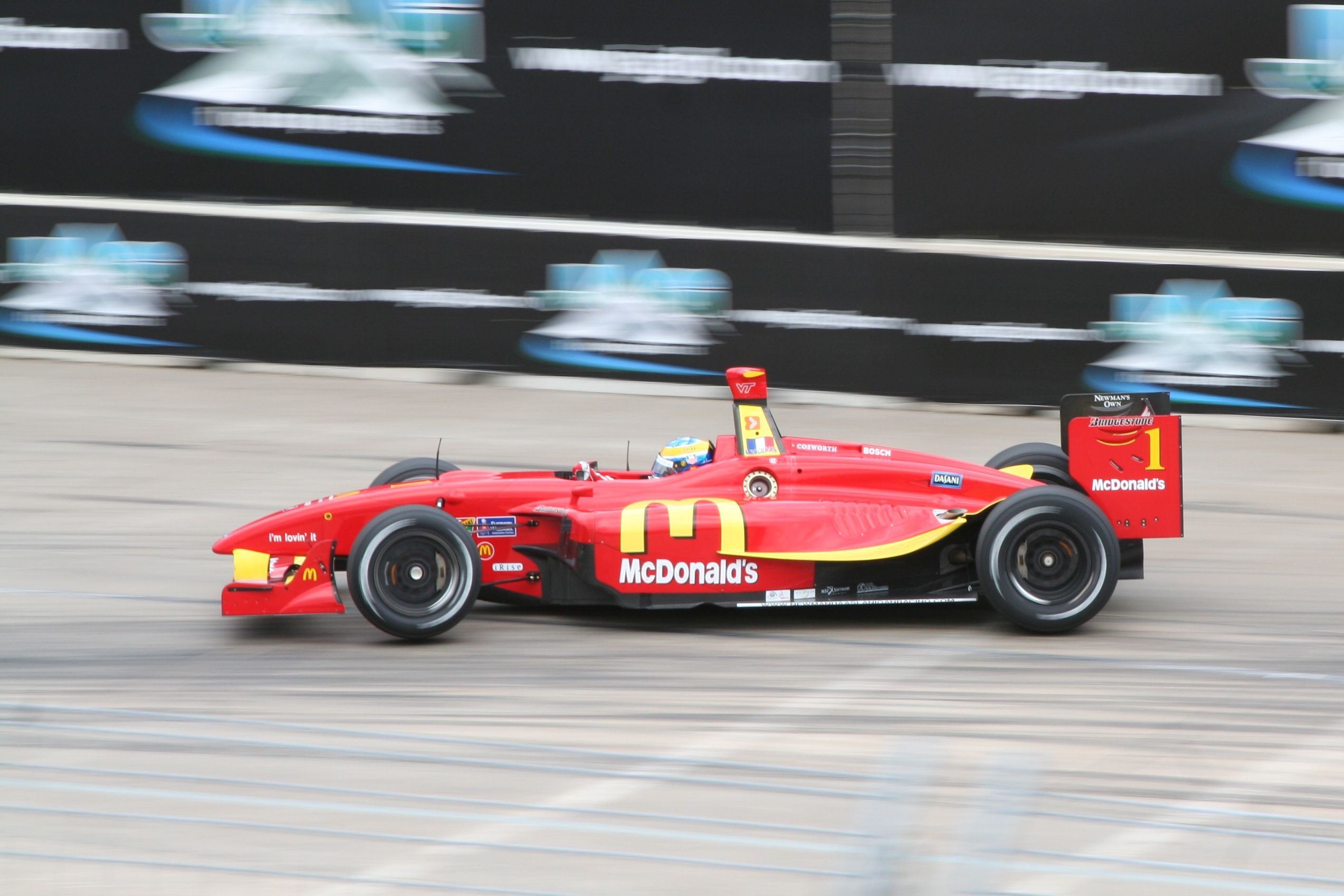
The DP01 in the hands of Sébastien Bourdais.

The Panoz DP01 was developed to be safer, and less aero-dependent while racing closely with other cars than previously existing Champ Cars. At a weight of 1460 pounds, the DP-01 was 105 pounds lighter than the outgoing Lola and approximately 9 inches shorter. It featured a 950-horsepower Cosworth XFE 2.65-liter turbocharged V8. The DP01 could go from 0-60 mph in 2.2 seconds, 0-100 mph in 4.2 seconds, and had an approximate top speed of 240 mph.

The Panoz had numerous changes from the previous Lola car, including more downforce from the underbody. Approximately 60% of the car's 5,500 lb (2,500 kg) of downforce at 200 mph (320 km/h) came from the bottom of the car. This was done by directing the air in a way so as to create additional downforce on the car, thereby effectively sucking it to the racetrack. This put less dependency on the front and rear wings in the event of a failure at high speed.

Another major change from the previous car was the raised nose, which was moved farther above the front wing and directing more air to the underbody aerodynamics. The raised nose also created a safer environment for the driver in the event of a head-on collision with a wall or another car. The driver sat more upright than in the Lola chassis, to reduce the chances of back injuries, and to better accommodate the use of the HANS device.

Champ Car intended to lower the purchasing cost of the chassis and spare parts to ease the financial pressure on the teams, who had to purchase a brand new car and were not able to reuse their existing chassis. Whereas the outgoing Lola chassis cost approximately US $450k, the DP-01 cost US $295k. Spare parts were also priced at about 30 percent cheaper, with a gearbox costing US $45k rather than US $110k and the price of a complete nose assembly was set at US $16k rather than US $33k.

An oval version was also in development, but did not progress beyond the wind tunnel model.

== Unveiling ==
The DP01 was officially unveiled to the public at the Champ Car Grand Prix of Road America on September 24, 2006. Brazilian Roberto Moreno piloted the DP01 at the unveiling, putting down a few demonstration laps shortly before the feature Champ Car race that day.

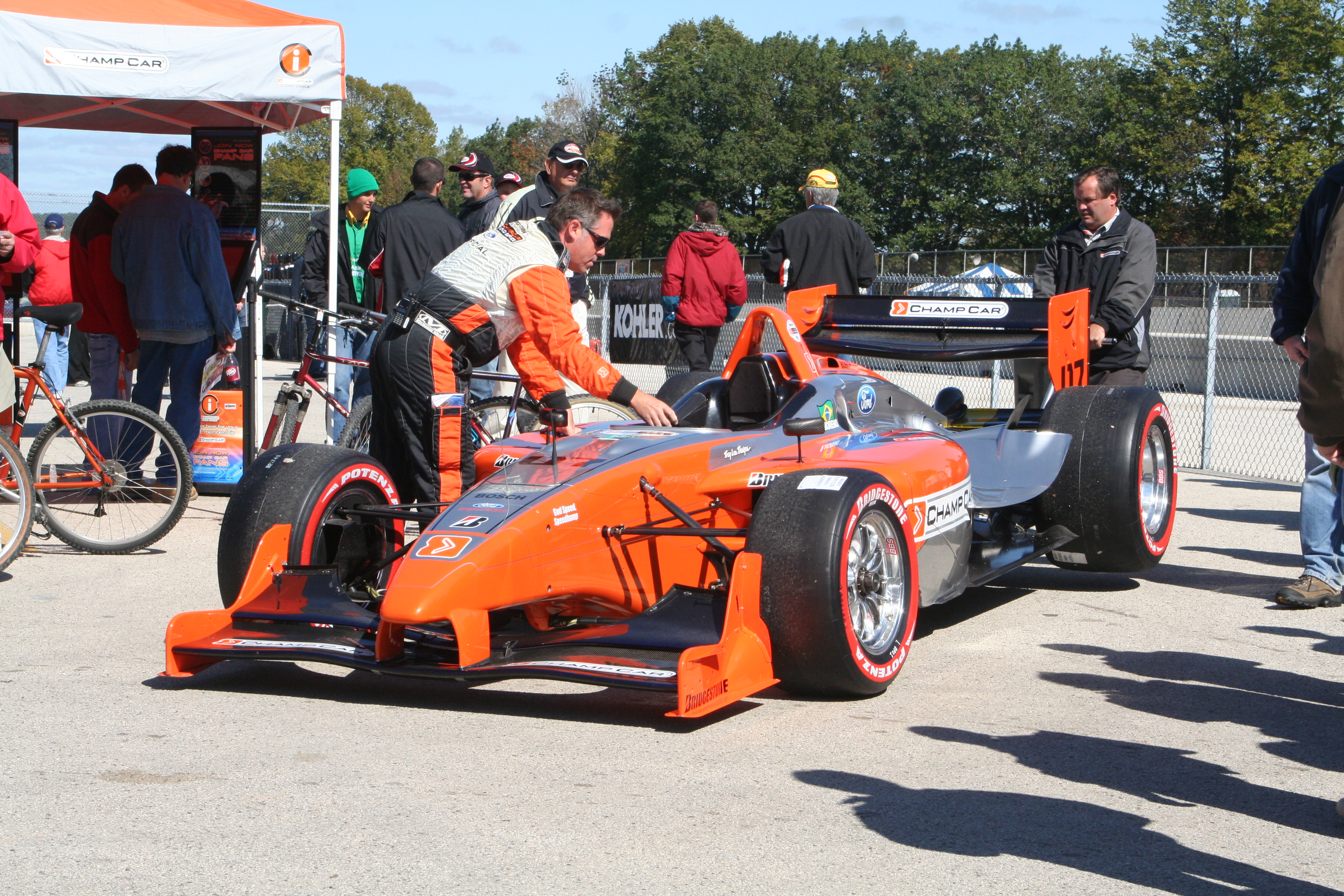
Panoz DP01, original livery

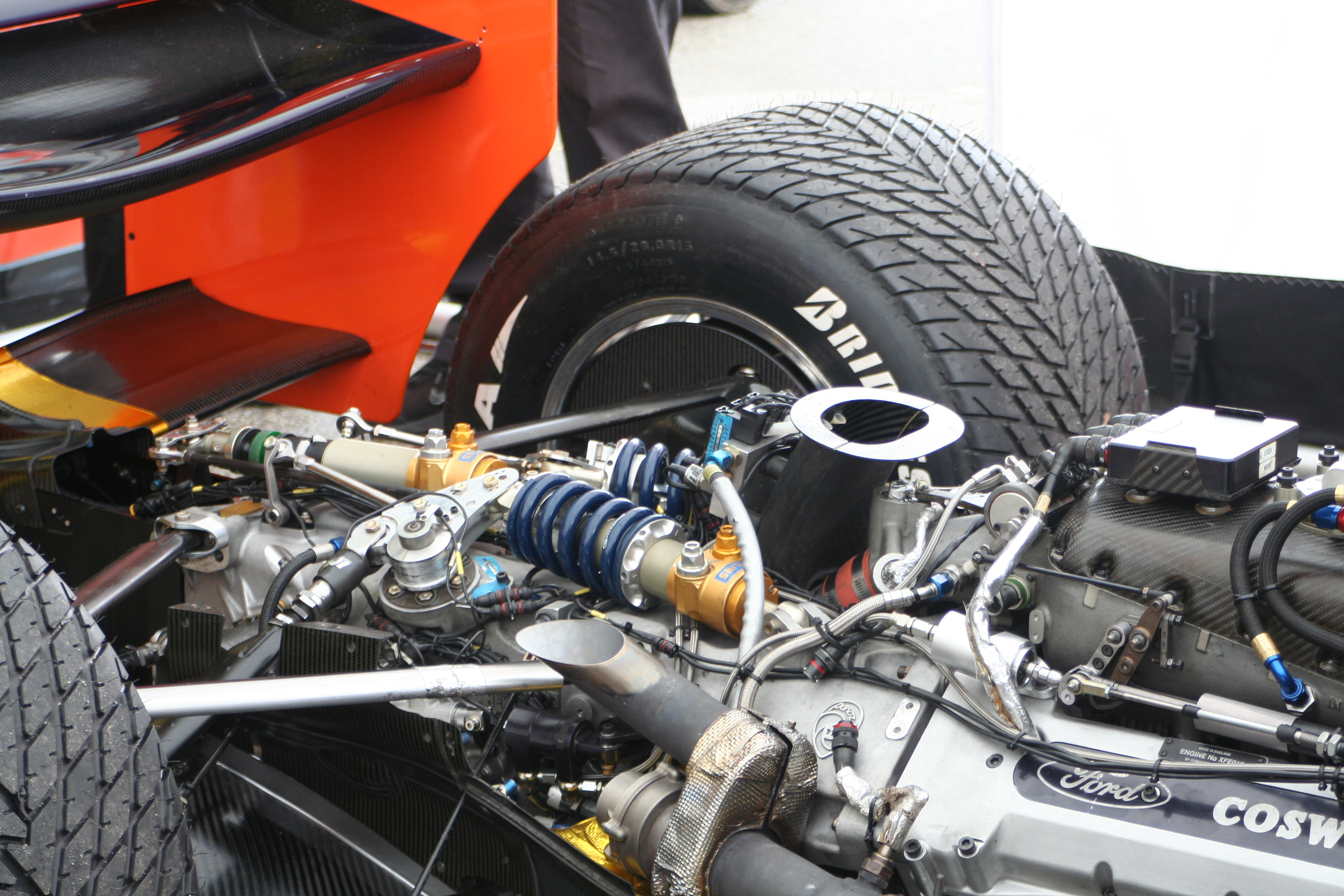
Panoz DP01 with Cosworth XFE engine

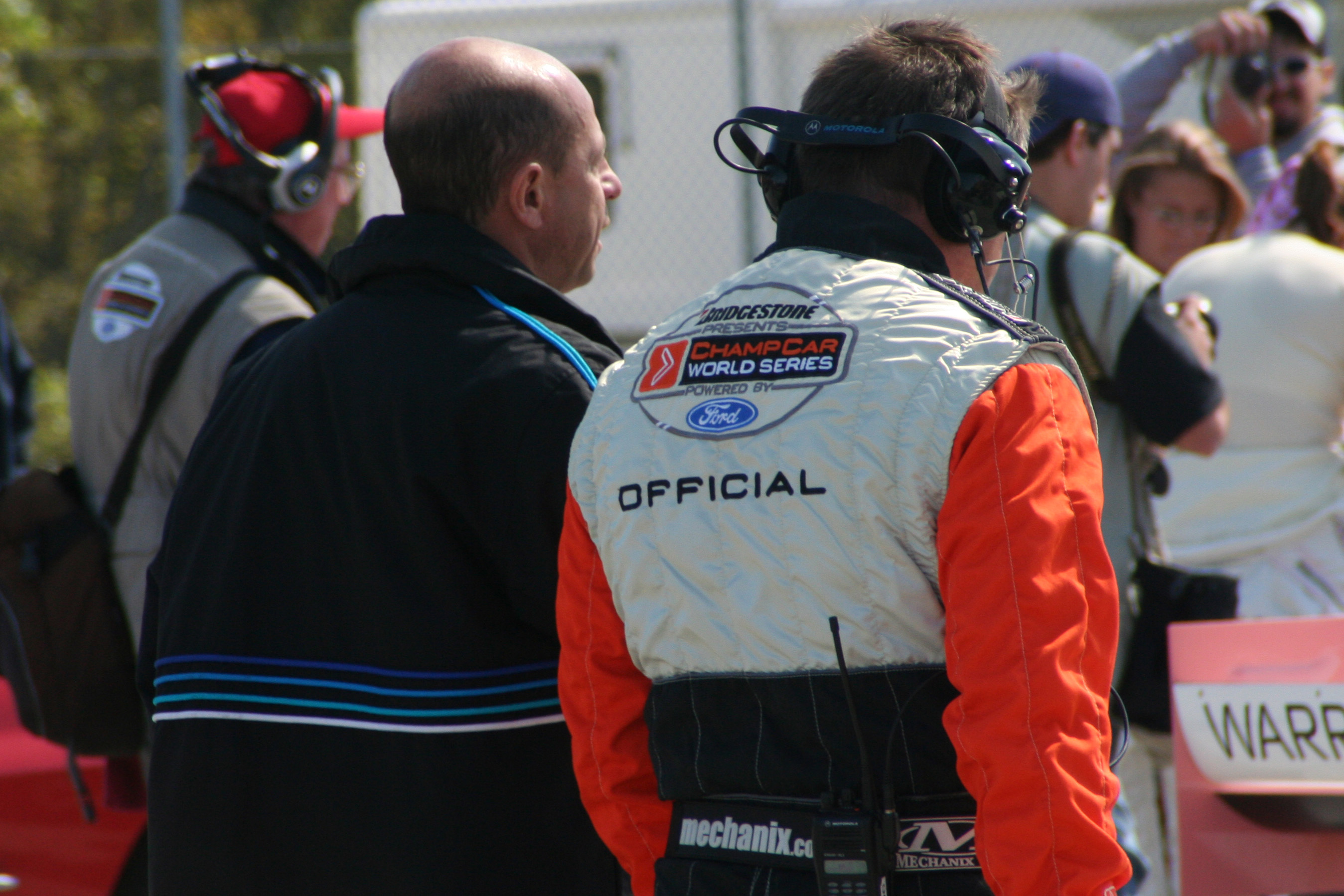
Roberto Moreno, driver of the unveiling laps

== Debut ==
The first Champ Car open test of the DP01 took place January 23 to January 25, 2007, at Sebring International Raceway. The second open test occurred on February 12 and 13 at MSR Houston. The third and last open test before the season took place March 9 and 10 at Mazda Raceway Laguna Seca. The Panoz DP01's race debut was at the Vegas Grand Prix on April 8, 2007. Team Australia's Will Power won the inaugural pole and the first race with the DP01.

== Final Champ Car DP01 race and legacy ==
In February 2008, the sale of Champ Car to the Indy Racing League (IRL) was consummated. Since the IRL used its own spec formula based around a chassis made by Italian manufacturer Dallara, the DP01 was retired from championship racing after approximately one year of racing service. The 2008 Grand Prix of Long Beach held in April 2008 served as a "Champ Car finale", and the DP01s were used by all participants. As Champ Car was merged into IndyCar, Panoz mocked up a wind tunnel model of a DP01 in oval trim with a central intake for IndyCar's naturally-aspirated engine as a replacement for the GF09 chassis, but a production chassis was never built. In a 2022 interview with motorsport.com, Will Power would declare the Panoz DP01 as his favourite race car to have raced in.

== Current status ==
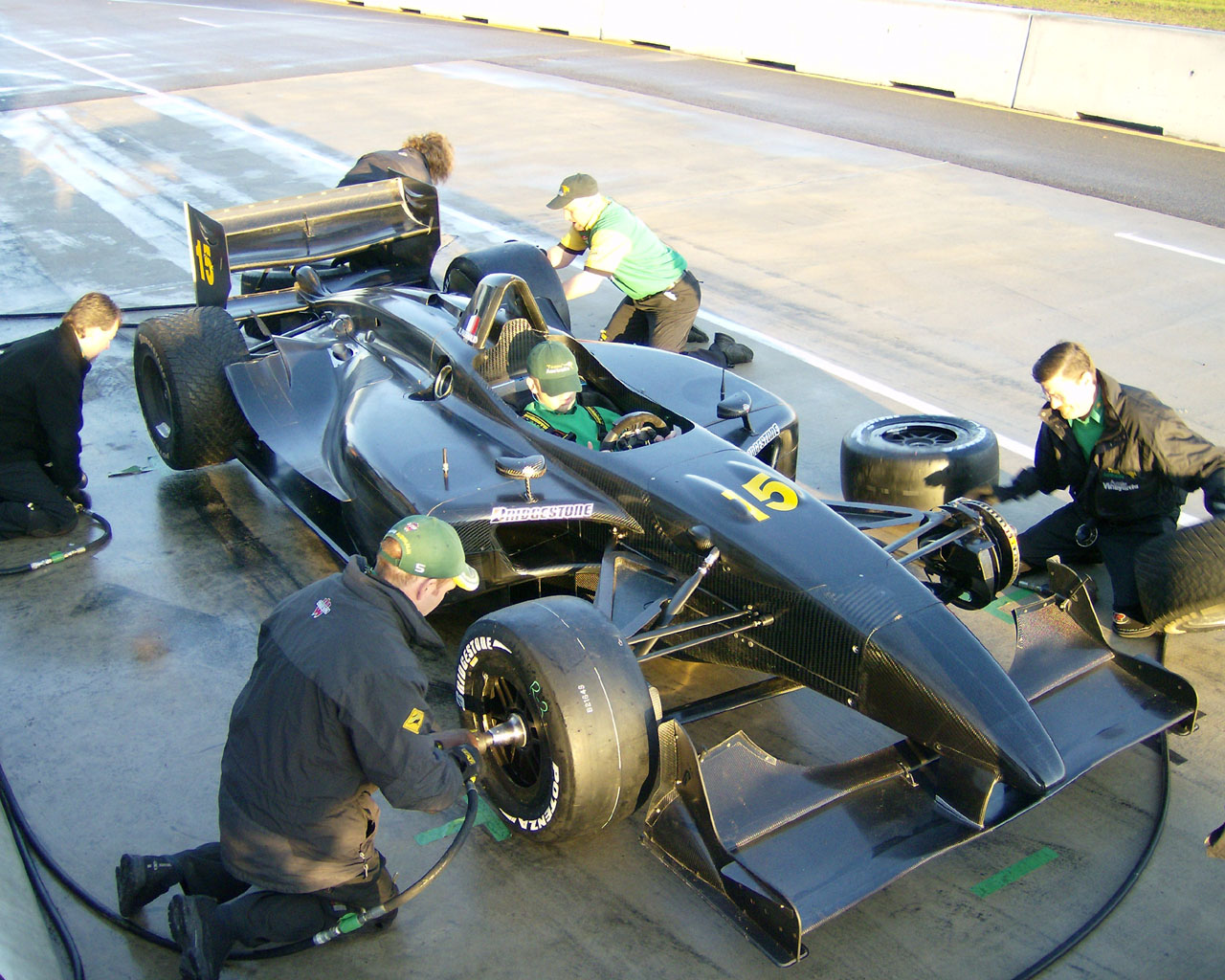
Pre-paint carbon fiber curves of the DP01 at 2007 MSR Houston open test.

The Panoz DP01 is no longer being manufactured. However, Elan Motorsports Technologies did use the car as somewhat of a model for the Panoz DP09 chassis for the Superleague Formula series that houses a naturally aspirated Menard 4.2 V12 engine.

DP01s owned by most Champ Car teams were sold to privateers in the United States and elsewhere. Two examples of the cars in use during 2010 were in the BOSS GP Series, where the chassis was campaigned by Henk de Boer and by Peter Milavec.

Former Atlantic Championship president Ben Johnston also owned multiple DP01s, which he intended to be raced in a new multi-class open-wheel racing series called GreenPrixUSA. However, the series was delayed due to track and possible engine issues. As of 2016, Johnston was forced to liquidate his racing assets due to divorce.

== Champ Car World Series results ==
See 2007 Champ Car season.

== IndyCar Series results ==
(key)

Year	Entrants	Engines	Drivers	No.	1	2	3	4	5	6	7	8	9	10	11	12	13	14	15	16	17	18	19
2008	Dale Coyne Racing	Cosworth XFE V8t			HMS	STP	MOT	LBH	KAN	INDY	MIL	TXS	IOW	RIR	WGL	NSH	MDO	EDM	KTY	SNM	DET	CHI	SRF^{1}
2008	Dale Coyne Racing	Cosworth XFE V8t	(Brazil) Bruno Junqueira	18				12															
2008	Dale Coyne Racing	Cosworth XFE V8t	(Brazil) Mario Moraes	19				20															
2008	Forsythe/Pettit Racing	Cosworth XFE V8t	(Canada) Paul Tracy	3				11															
2008	Forsythe/Pettit Racing	Cosworth XFE V8t	(France) Franck Montagny	7				2															
2008	Forsythe/Pettit Racing	Cosworth XFE V8t	(Mexico) David Martínez	37				8															
2008	HVM Racing	Cosworth XFE V8t	(Venezuela) E. J. Viso	33				9															
2008	HVM Racing	Cosworth XFE V8t	(France) Nelson Philippe	4				15															
2008	HVM Racing	Cosworth XFE V8t	(Brazil) Roberto Moreno	14				17															
2008	Rocketsports Racing	Cosworth XFE V8t	(Brazil) Antônio Pizzonia	9				16															
2008	Rocketsports Racing	Cosworth XFE V8t	(Finland) Juho Annala	10				18															
2008	KV Racing Technology	Cosworth XFE V8t	(Spain) Oriol Servià	5				5															
2008	KV Racing Technology	Cosworth XFE V8t	(Australia) Will Power	8				1*															
2008	KV Racing Technology	Cosworth XFE V8t	(United States) Jimmy Vasser	12				10															
2008	Walker Racing	Cosworth XFE V8t	(Canada) Alex Tagliani	15				7															
2008	Pacific Coast Motorsports	Cosworth XFE V8t	(United States) Alex Figge	29				14															
2008	Pacific Coast Motorsports	Cosworth XFE V8t	(Mexico) Mario Domínguez	96				3															

^1 Non-points-paying, exhibition race.

== Influence ==
=== Panoz DP09 ===
Panoz DP09
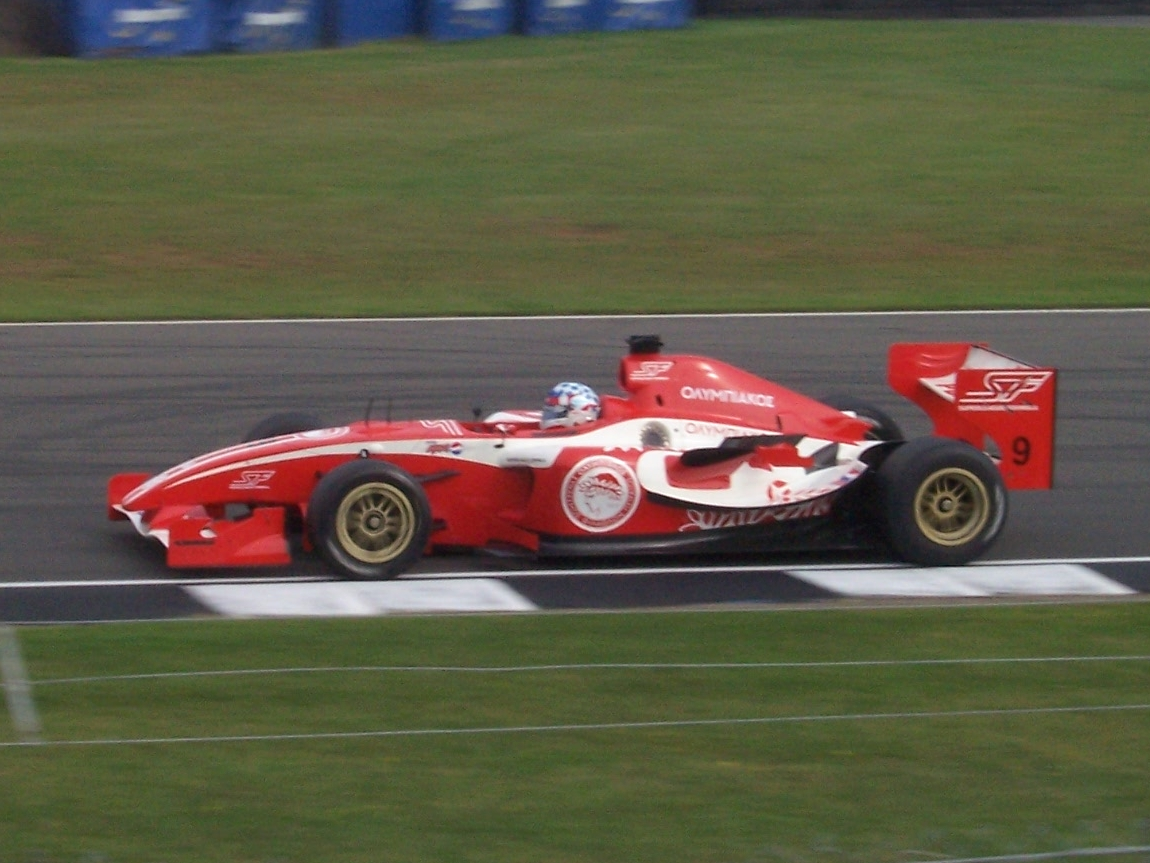
- Category: Superleague Formula
- Constructor: Panoz/Élan Motorsport Technologies
- Designers: Simon Marshall, Nick Alcock

Technical specifications
- Chassis: Carbon fiber monocoque
- Suspension (front): Steel/Carbon wishbones and steel pushrod to twin shocks
- Suspension (rear): Steel aero tube wishbones and pushrod to twin shocks
- Engine: Menard 4.2 V12 rear mid-engined
- Transmission: Hewland LSFA 6-speed semi-automatic
- Fuel: Sonangol
- Tyres: Michelin

Competition history
- Notable entrants: all Superleague Formula teams
- Notable drivers: all Superleague Formula drivers
- Debut: 2008 Donington Park Superleague Formula round
Races	Wins	Poles	F/Laps
63	63	63	63

The Panoz DP09 (commonly known as the Superleague DP09) was the sole spec open-wheel race car used in the Superleague Formula series. It was produced by Élan Motorsport Technologies at Braselton, Georgia, in the United States. Panoz and Èlan engineers developed the Panoz DP09 to be the exclusive chassis for the Superleague Formula series that began in 2008. The DP09 was based on the 2007 Panoz DP01 Champ Cars, while in 2009 the cars were updated to become the DP09B. Since the series' closure midway through 2011, DP09Bs have seen limited use in the BOSS GP Series.

The DP09 featured a 750-horsepower 4.2-liter V12 engine designed by Menard Competition Technologies. It also featured underbody aerodynamics, a Hewland six-speed semi-automatic gearbox, and weighed about 1,650 lb (750 kg). The DP09 race cars also were sans traction control, launch control, and anti-stall technologies, making performance dependent on driver skill and the team setup.
