= John Bosch =

Dutch racing driver (born 1964)

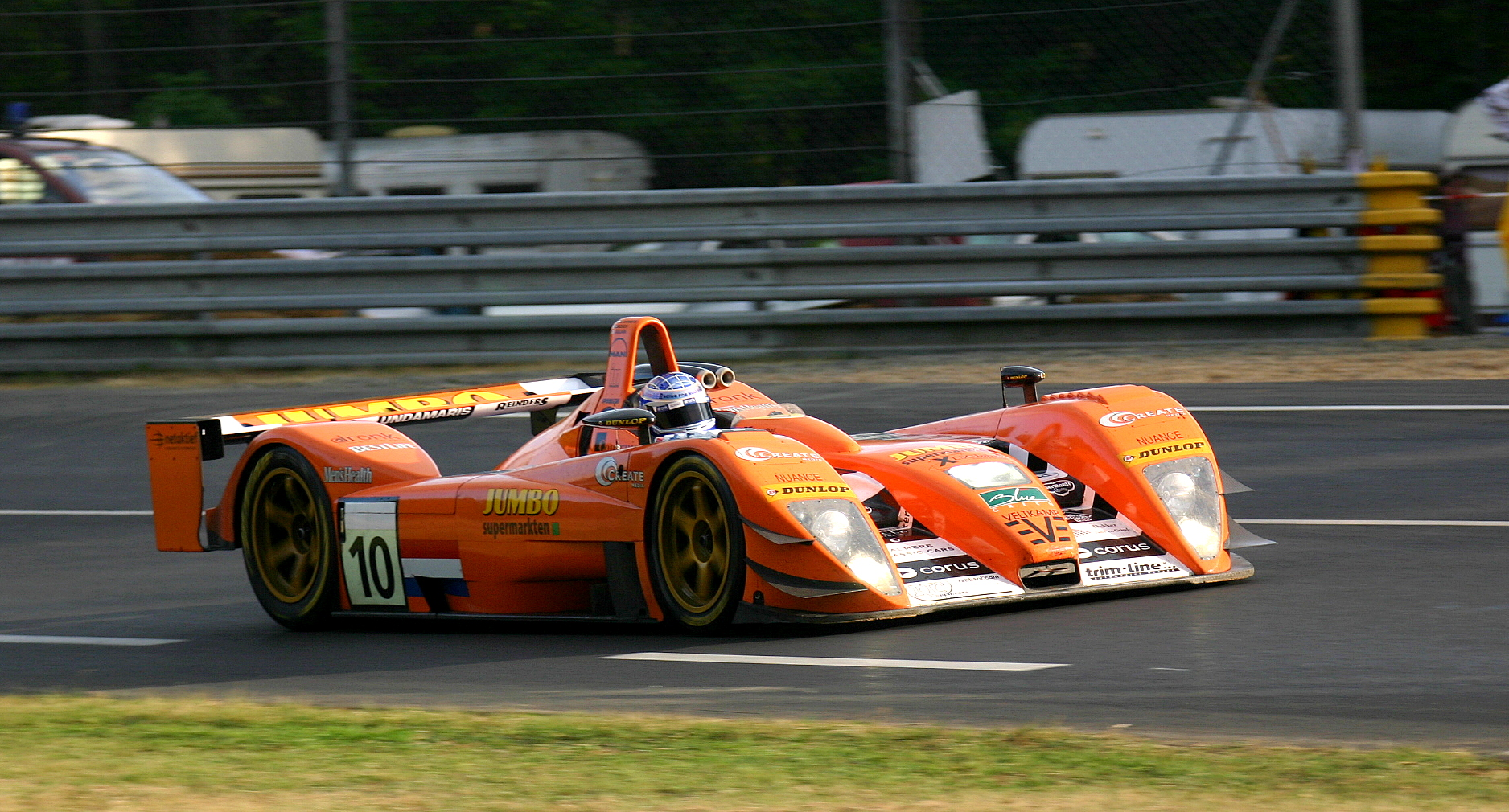
- Bosch in 2005
- Nationality: (Netherlands) Dutch
- Born: April 1, 1964 (age 62) Zaandam, Netherlands

Championship titles
- 2003 1989: FIA Sportscar Championship - SR1; Netherlands Rally Championship

24 Hours of Le Mans career
- Years: 2003–2005
- Teams: Racing for Holland, Barron Connor Racing
- Best finish: 5th (2005)

John Bosch (born April 1, 1964) is a Dutch former racing driver who last competed for Next Gen Motorsports in the Continental Tire Sports Car Challenge.

In 2003, Bosch, along with Racing for Holland team owner Jan Lammers, won the FIA Sportscar Championship.

== Racing record ==
=== Career summary ===
Season	Series	Team	Races	Wins	Poles	F/Laps	Podiums	Points	Position
1982	British Formula Ford Championship		?	?	?	?	?	?	?
1983	FIA European Formula 3 Championship	Barron Racing	7	0	0	0	0	2	20th
1983	German Formula Three Championship	Barron Racing Team	1	0	0	0	0	N/A	NC
1983	French Formula Three Championship	Barron Racing	1	0	0	0	0	?	?
1984	FIA European Formula 3 Championship	Barron Racing	2	0	0	0	0	N/A	NC
2002	SPEED World Challenge - Touring Car	Tecmark Corp/Pizza Hut	6	0	0	0	0	21	36th
2003	24 Hours of Le Mans - LMP900	Racing for Holland	1	0	0	0	0	N/A	4th
2003	FIA Sportscar Championship - SR1	Racing for Holland	5	3	0	0	5	44	**1st**
2004	24 Hours of Le Mans - GTS	Barron Connor Racing	1	0	0	0	0	N/A	DNF
2004	American Le Mans Series - GTS	Barron Connor Racing	1	0	0	0	1	22	9th
2004	Le Mans Endurance Series - GTS	Barron Connor Racing	4	0	0	0	1	20.5	4th
2005	24 Hours of Le Mans - LMP1	Racing for Holland	1	0	0	0	0	N/A	5th
2005	Ferrari Challenge Europe - Trofeo Pirelli	Kroymans	?	?	?	?	?	8	19th
2006	Ferrari Challenge Europe - Trofeo Pirelli	Barron Racing; Kroymans	?	?	?	?	?	110.4	**3rd**
2008	Grand-Am Koni Challenge - ST	SDS Performance Racing	2	0	?	?	0	4	91st
2009	KONI Sports Car Challenge - ST	Next Gen Motorsports	3	0	?	?	0	41	63rd
2010	Continental Tire Sports Car Challenge - ST	Next Gen Motorsports	3	0	0	0	0	31	65th

=== Complete 24 Hours of Le Mans results ===
Year	Team	Co-Drivers	Car	Class	Laps	Pos.	Class Pos.
2003	(Netherlands) Racing for Holland	(Netherlands) Jan Lammers (United Kingdom) Andy Wallace	Dome S101-Judd	LMP900	360	6th	4th
2004	(Netherlands) Barron Connor Racing	(Italy) Thomas Biagi (United States) Danny Sullivan	Ferrari 575-GTC Maranello	GTS	163	DNF	DNF
2005	(Netherlands) Racing for Holland	(United States) Elton Julian (Netherlands) Jan Lammers	Dome S101-Judd	LMP1	346	7th	5th

=== Complete FIA Sportscar Championship results ===
(key) (Races in bold indicate pole position; results in italics indicate fastest lap)

Year	Entrant	Class	Chassis	Engine	1	2	3	4	5	6	7	Rank	Points
2003	Racing for Holland	SR1	Dome S101	Judd GV4 4.0 L V10	EST; 3	LAU; 1	MON; 1	OSC; 2	DON; 1	SPA; Ret	NOG	1st	44

=== Complete American Le Mans Series results ===
Year	Entrant	Class	Chassis	Engine	1	2	3	4	5	6	7	8	9	Rank	Points	Ref
2004	Barron Connor Racing	GTS	Ferrari 575-GTC Maranello	Ferrari F133 6.0 L V12	SEB; 2	MDO	LIM	SON	POR	MOS	ELK	PET	LGA	9th	22	

=== Complete Le Mans Endurance Series results ===
(key) (Races in bold indicate pole position; results in italics indicate fastest lap)

Year	Entrant	Class	Chassis	Engine	1	2	3	4	Rank	Points
2004	Barron Connor Racing	GTS	Ferrari 575-GTC Maranello	Ferrari F133 6.0 L V12	MNZ; 2	NÜR; 4	SIL; 4	SPA; 4	4th	20.5
