= 2003 1000 km of Spa =

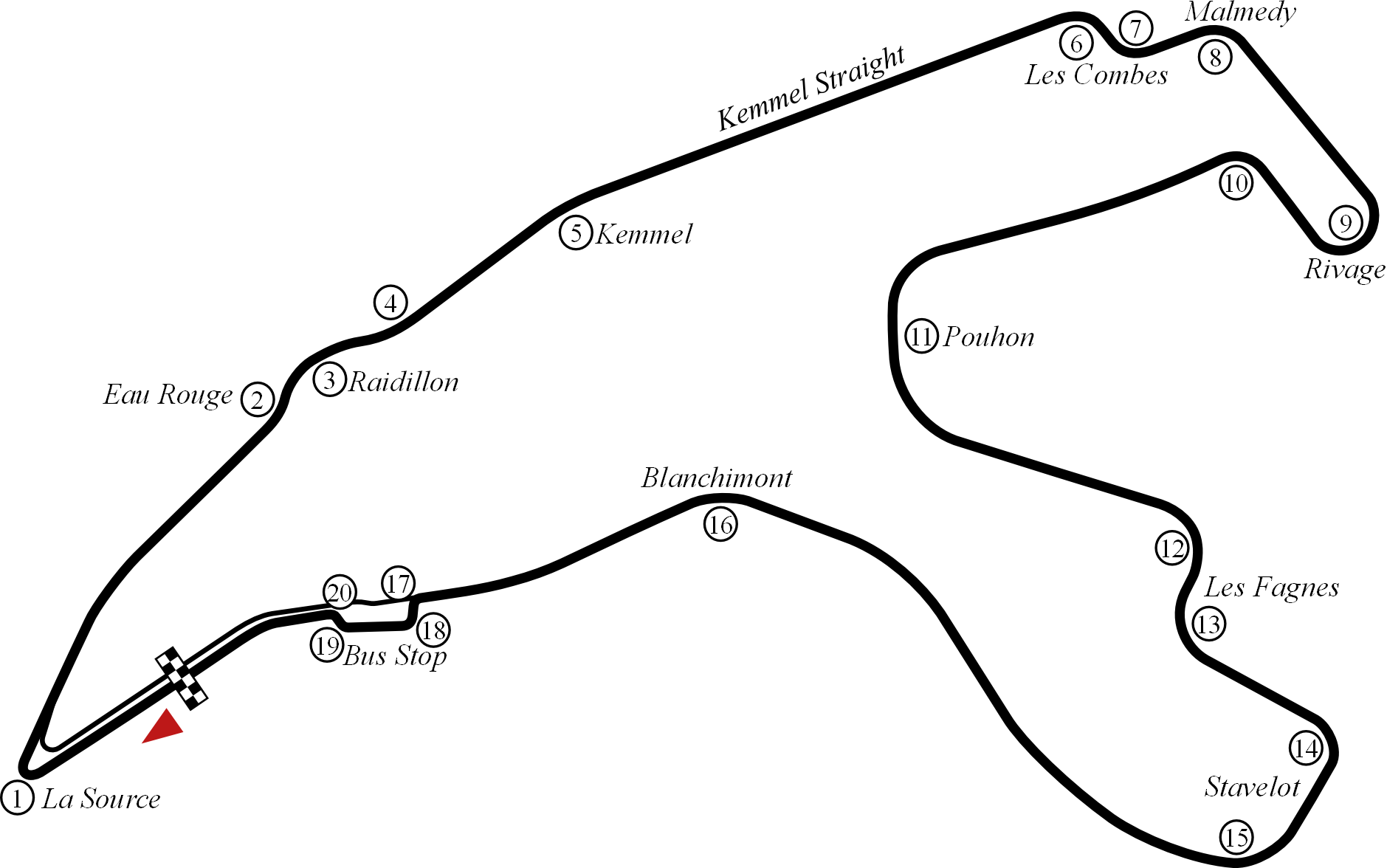
Layout of the Circuit de Spa-Francorchamps (1995–2003)

The 2003 1000 km of Spa was the sixth race for the 2003 FIA Sportscar Championship season (running under SR1 and SR2 classes) and the ninth race for the 2003 British GT Championship season (running under GTO and GT Cup classes), running in combination at the Circuit de Spa-Francorchamps. It took place on August 31, 2003.

== Official results ==
Class winners in bold. Cars failing to complete 75% of winner's distance marked as Not Classified (NC).

Pos	Class	No	Team	Drivers	Chassis	Tyre	Laps
Pos	Class	No	Team	Drivers	Engine	Tyre	Laps
1	**SR1**	**25**	**Audi Sport Japan Team Goh**	**(Denmark) Tom Kristensen (Japan) Seiji Ara**	**Audi R8**	MI	**144**
1	**SR1**	**25**	**Audi Sport Japan Team Goh**	**(Denmark) Tom Kristensen (Japan) Seiji Ara**	**Audi 3.6L Turbo V8**	MI	**144**
2	SR1	16	(France) Pescarolo Sport	(France) Franck Lagorce (France) Stéphane Sarrazin	Courage C60	G	140
2	SR1	16	(France) Pescarolo Sport	(France) Franck Lagorce (France) Stéphane Sarrazin	Peugeot A32 3.2L Turbo V6	G	140
3	SR1	2	(Netherlands) Racing for Holland	(Italy) Beppe Gabbiani (Bolivia) Felipe Ortiz	Dome S101	D	138
3	SR1	2	(Netherlands) Racing for Holland	(Italy) Beppe Gabbiani (Bolivia) Felipe Ortiz	Judd GV4 4.0L V10	D	138
4	SR1	6	(United Kingdom) Taurus Sports Racing	(United Kingdom) Justin Keen (Italy) Giovanni Lavaggi (United States) Larry Oberto	Lola B2K/10	D	138
4	SR1	6	(United Kingdom) Taurus Sports Racing	(United Kingdom) Justin Keen (Italy) Giovanni Lavaggi (United States) Larry Oberto	Judd GV4 4.0L V10	D	138
5	**SR2**	**52**	**(Italy) Lucchini Engineering**	**(Italy) Mirko Savoldi (Italy) Piergiuseppe Peroni (Italy) Filippo Francioni**	**Lucchini SR2002**	A	**129**
5	**SR2**	**52**	**(Italy) Lucchini Engineering**	**(Italy) Mirko Savoldi (Italy) Piergiuseppe Peroni (Italy) Filippo Francioni**	**Nissan (AER) VQL 3.0L V6**	A	**129**
6	**GTO**	**122**	**(United Kingdom) Rollcentre Racing**	**(United Kingdom) Martin Short (United Kingdom) Tom Herridge (Portugal) João Barbosa**	**Mosler MT900R**	D	**127**
6	**GTO**	**122**	**(United Kingdom) Rollcentre Racing**	**(United Kingdom) Martin Short (United Kingdom) Tom Herridge (Portugal) João Barbosa**	**Chevrolet LS1 5.7L V8**	D	**127**
7	SR2	63	(Switzerland) Equipe Palmyr	(Switzerland) Philippe Favre (Switzerland) Christophe Ricard	Lucchini SR2000	A	127
7	SR2	63	(Switzerland) Equipe Palmyr	(Switzerland) Philippe Favre (Switzerland) Christophe Ricard	Alfa Romeo 3.0L V6	A	127
8	GTO	133	(United Kingdom) Balfe Motorsport	(United Kingdom) Shaun Balfe (United Kingdom) Jamie Derbyshire (Brazil) Thomas Erdos	Mosler MT900R	D	127
8	GTO	133	(United Kingdom) Balfe Motorsport	(United Kingdom) Shaun Balfe (United Kingdom) Jamie Derbyshire (Brazil) Thomas Erdos	Chevrolet LS1 5.7L V8	D	127
9	GTO	192	(United Kingdom) DeWALT Motorsport Salisbury	(United Kingdom) Rob Barff (United Kingdom) Richard Hay (United Kingdom) Michael Caine	TVR Tuscan T400R	D	126
9	GTO	192	(United Kingdom) DeWALT Motorsport Salisbury	(United Kingdom) Rob Barff (United Kingdom) Richard Hay (United Kingdom) Michael Caine	TVR Speed Six 4.0L I6	D	126
10	**Guest**	**121**	**(Belgium) Belgian Racing**	**(Belgium) Renaud Kuppens (Belgium) Sébastien Ugeux**	**Gillet Vertigo Streiff**	D	**123**
10	**Guest**	**121**	**(Belgium) Belgian Racing**	**(Belgium) Renaud Kuppens (Belgium) Sébastien Ugeux**	**Alfa Romeo 3.6L V6**	D	**123**
11	GTO	123	(United Kingdom) Peninsula TVR Racesport	(United Kingdom) John Hartshorne (United Kingdom) Daniel Eagling (United Kingdom) Graeme Mundy	TVR Tuscan T400R	D	122
11	GTO	123	(United Kingdom) Peninsula TVR Racesport	(United Kingdom) John Hartshorne (United Kingdom) Daniel Eagling (United Kingdom) Graeme Mundy	TVR Speed Six 4.0L I6	D	122
12	GTO	169	(United Kingdom) Eclipse Motorsport	(United Kingdom) Piers Johnson (United Kingdom) Simon Pullan (Republic of Ireland) Shane Lynch	TVR Tuscan T400R	D	121
12	GTO	169	(United Kingdom) Eclipse Motorsport	(United Kingdom) Piers Johnson (United Kingdom) Simon Pullan (Republic of Ireland) Shane Lynch	TVR Speed Six 4.0L I6	D	121
13	Guest	110	(France) Christophe Lemée (France) Riverside	(France) Christophe Lemée (France) Jonathan Cochet (Belgium) Jean-François Hemroulle	Lamborghini Diablo GTR	P	120
13	Guest	110	(France) Christophe Lemée (France) Riverside	(France) Christophe Lemée (France) Jonathan Cochet (Belgium) Jean-François Hemroulle	Lamborghini 6.0L V12	P	120
14	GTO	150	(United Kingdom) Xero Competition	(United Kingdom) Ricky Cole (United Kingdom) Paula Cook (Republic of Ireland) Peter Le Bas	Chevrolet Corvette LM-GT	D	120
14	GTO	150	(United Kingdom) Xero Competition	(United Kingdom) Ricky Cole (United Kingdom) Paula Cook (Republic of Ireland) Peter Le Bas	Chevrolet LS1 5.7L V8	D	120
15	**GT Cup**	**177**	**(United Kingdom) GruppeM / Tech9 Motorsport**	**(United States) Liz Halliday (United Kingdom) Amanda Stretton (United Kingdom) Tom Shrimpton**	**Porsche 996 GT3 Cup**	D	**117**
15	**GT Cup**	**177**	**(United Kingdom) GruppeM / Tech9 Motorsport**	**(United States) Liz Halliday (United Kingdom) Amanda Stretton (United Kingdom) Tom Shrimpton**	**Porsche 3.6L Flat-6**	D	**117**
16	GTO	140	(France) Point Preparation	(France) Franck Pelle (United Kingdom) Peter Cook	Porsche 911 Turbo	D	116
16	GTO	140	(France) Point Preparation	(France) Franck Pelle (United Kingdom) Peter Cook	Porsche 3.6L Turbo Flat-6	D	116
17	GTO	120	(United Kingdom) Master Motorsport (United Kingdom) Damax	(United Kingdom) Nick Adams (United Kingdom) Marco Attard (United Kingdom) Steven Brady (United Kingdom) Robin Ward	Ferrari 360 Modena N-GT	D	116
17	GTO	120	(United Kingdom) Master Motorsport (United Kingdom) Damax	(United Kingdom) Nick Adams (United Kingdom) Marco Attard (United Kingdom) Steven Brady (United Kingdom) Robin Ward	Ferrari 3.6L V8	D	116
18	GT Cup	146	(United Kingdom) Team Aero	(United Kingdom) Keith Ahlers (United Kingdom) Rob Wells (United Kingdom) Christian Bock	Morgan Aero 8-R	D	114
18	GT Cup	146	(United Kingdom) Team Aero	(United Kingdom) Keith Ahlers (United Kingdom) Rob Wells (United Kingdom) Christian Bock	BMW (Mader) 4.0L V8	D	114
19	GT Cup	166	(United Kingdom) Richard Thorne Motorsport	(United Kingdom) Adam Sharpe (United Kingdom) Aaron Scott (New Zealand) Neil Cunningham	Morgan Aero 8-R	D	114
19	GT Cup	166	(United Kingdom) Richard Thorne Motorsport	(United Kingdom) Adam Sharpe (United Kingdom) Aaron Scott (New Zealand) Neil Cunningham	BMW (Mader) 4.0L V8	D	114
20	GTO	111	(United Kingdom) Graham Nash Motorsport	(Belgium) Armand Fumal (Austria) Manfred Jurasz (Italy) Mauro Casadei	Porsche 996 GT3-R	D	109
20	GTO	111	(United Kingdom) Graham Nash Motorsport	(Belgium) Armand Fumal (Austria) Manfred Jurasz (Italy) Mauro Casadei	Porsche 3.6L Flat-6	D	109
21	GT Cup	147	(United Kingdom) Atlanta Motorsport	(United Kingdom) Rob Croydon (United Kingdom) Rob Durrant (United Kingdom) Andy Ward	Renault Clio V6	D	100
21	GT Cup	147	(United Kingdom) Atlanta Motorsport	(United Kingdom) Rob Croydon (United Kingdom) Rob Durrant (United Kingdom) Andy Ward	Renault 3.0L V6	D	100
NC	GTO	127	(United Kingdom) CDL Racing	(United Kingdom) Steve Hyde (United Kingdom) Gareth Evans (New Zealand) Carl Hansen	TVR Tuscan T400R	D	93
NC	GTO	127	(United Kingdom) CDL Racing	(United Kingdom) Steve Hyde (United Kingdom) Gareth Evans (New Zealand) Carl Hansen	TVR Speed Six 4.0L I6	D	93
NC	GT Cup	143	(Italy) Scuderia Grifo Corse	(Italy) Michelangelo Segatori (Italy) Walter Colacino	Lotus Elise Sport 200	D	93
NC	GT Cup	143	(Italy) Scuderia Grifo Corse	(Italy) Michelangelo Segatori (Italy) Walter Colacino	Rover K18 1.8L I4	D	93
NC	SR2	99	(France) PiR Compétition	(France) Pierre Bruneau (France) Marc Rostan	Pilbeam MP84	A	90
NC	SR2	99	(France) PiR Compétition	(France) Pierre Bruneau (France) Marc Rostan	Nissan (AER) VQL 3.0L V6	A	90
DNF	SR1	5	(United Kingdom) RN Motorsport	(United Kingdom) Andy Wallace (Japan) Hayanari Shimoda	DBA4 03S	D	104
DNF	SR1	5	(United Kingdom) RN Motorsport	(United Kingdom) Andy Wallace (Japan) Hayanari Shimoda	Zytek ZG348 3.4L V8	D	104
DNF	GT Cup	176	(United Kingdom) Gruppe M / Tech9 Motorsport	(United Kingdom) Patrick Pearce (United Kingdom) Bob Berridge (Republic of Ireland) Matt Griffin	Porsche 996 GT3 Cup	D	87
DNF	GT Cup	176	(United Kingdom) Gruppe M / Tech9 Motorsport	(United Kingdom) Patrick Pearce (United Kingdom) Bob Berridge (Republic of Ireland) Matt Griffin	Porsche 3.6L Flat-6	D	87
DNF	GTO	191	(United Kingdom) DeWALT Motorsport Salisbury	(United Kingdom) Lee Caroline (United Kingdom) Mike Jordan (United Kingdom) Richard Stanton	TVR Tuscan T400R	D	84
DNF	GTO	191	(United Kingdom) DeWALT Motorsport Salisbury	(United Kingdom) Lee Caroline (United Kingdom) Mike Jordan (United Kingdom) Richard Stanton	TVR Speed Six 4.0L I6	D	84
DNF	GT Cup	144	(United Kingdom) ISL Motorsport	(United Kingdom) Stuart Turvey (United Kingdom) Alan Bonner (United Kingdom) Alun Edwards	Marcos Mantis	D	63
DNF	GT Cup	144	(United Kingdom) ISL Motorsport	(United Kingdom) Stuart Turvey (United Kingdom) Alan Bonner (United Kingdom) Alun Edwards	Ford Modular 4.6L V8	D	63
DNF	Guest	130	(Netherlands) Marcos Racing International	(Netherlands) Cor Euser (Netherlands) Jos Menten (United Kingdom) Calum Lockie	Marcos Mantara LM600	D	62
DNF	Guest	130	(Netherlands) Marcos Racing International	(Netherlands) Cor Euser (Netherlands) Jos Menten (United Kingdom) Calum Lockie	Chevrolet 7.0L V8	D	62
DNF	GT Cup	142	(United Kingdom) Glenvarigill Racing	(United Kingdom) Hector Lester (United Kingdom) Keith Robinson (United Kingdom) John Greasley	Ferrari 360 Modena Challenge	D	61
DNF	GT Cup	142	(United Kingdom) Glenvarigill Racing	(United Kingdom) Hector Lester (United Kingdom) Keith Robinson (United Kingdom) John Greasley	Ferrari 3.6L V8	D	61
DNF	SR2	61	(United Kingdom) Team Jota	(United Kingdom) Sam Hignett (United Kingdom) Nigel Taylor (United Kingdom) John Stack	Pilbeam MP84	A	60
DNF	SR2	61	(United Kingdom) Team Jota	(United Kingdom) Sam Hignett (United Kingdom) Nigel Taylor (United Kingdom) John Stack	Nissan (AER) VQL 3.0L V6	A	60
DNF	GT Cup	149	(United Kingdom) Brunswick Endurance Racing	(United Kingdom) Peter Cate (United Kingdom) Rupert Bullock (United Kingdom) Graham Saunders	Lotus Elise	D	48
DNF	GT Cup	149	(United Kingdom) Brunswick Endurance Racing	(United Kingdom) Peter Cate (United Kingdom) Rupert Bullock (United Kingdom) Graham Saunders	Rover K18 1.8L I4	D	48
DNF	SR2	55	(Italy) GP Racing	(Italy) Gianni Collini (Italy) Fabio Mancini (Italy) Massimo Saccomanno	Lucchini SR2001	A	43
DNF	SR2	55	(Italy) GP Racing	(Italy) Gianni Collini (Italy) Fabio Mancini (Italy) Massimo Saccomanno	Alfa Romeo 3.0L V6	A	43
DNF	SR1	1	(Netherlands) Racing for Holland	(Netherlands) Jan Lammers (Netherlands) John Bosch	Dome S101	D	42
DNF	SR1	1	(Netherlands) Racing for Holland	(Netherlands) Jan Lammers (Netherlands) John Bosch	Judd GV4 4.0L V10	D	42
DNF	GT Cup	129	(United Kingdom) GulfAir Racing	(United Kingdom) Steve Wood (United Kingdom) Mark Sumpter (United Kingdom) Stuart Scott	Volkswagen Golf GTI	D	38
DNF	GT Cup	129	(United Kingdom) GulfAir Racing	(United Kingdom) Steve Wood (United Kingdom) Mark Sumpter (United Kingdom) Stuart Scott	Volkswagen 1.8L Turbo I4	D	38

== Statistics ==
- Pole Position - #25 Audi Sport Japan Team Goh - 2:14.889
- Fastest Lap - #25 Audi Sport Japan Team Goh - 2:18.074
- Average Speed - 172.558 km/h

FIA Sportscar Championship
Previous race: 2003 FIA Sportscar Championship Donington	2003 season	Next race: 2003 FIA Sportscar Championship Nogaro
