= 2003 FIA Sportscar Championship Nogaro =

Layout of the Circuit Paul Armagnac (1989–2006)

The 2003 FIA Sportscar Championship Nogaro was the seventh and final race for the 2003 FIA Sportscar Championship season, as well as the final race for the FIA Sportscar Championship series overall. It was held at Circuit Paul Armagnac and ran for two hours and thirty minutes. It took place on September 21, 2003.

This race also marked one of the smallest fields in FIA Sportscar history.

== Official results ==
Class winners in bold. Cars failing to complete 75% of winner's distance marked as Not Classified (NC).

Pos	Class	No	Team	Drivers	Chassis	Tyre	Laps
Pos	Class	No	Team	Drivers	Engine	Tyre	Laps
1	**SR1**	**16**	**(France) Pescarolo Sport**	**(France) Franck Lagorce (France) Soheil Ayari**	**Courage C60**	G	**103**
1	**SR1**	**16**	**(France) Pescarolo Sport**	**(France) Franck Lagorce (France) Soheil Ayari**	**Peugeot A32 3.2L Turbo V6**	G	**103**
2	SR1	2	(Netherlands) Racing for Holland	(Italy) Beppe Gabbiani (Bolivia) Felipe Ortiz	Dome S101	D	102
2	SR1	2	(Netherlands) Racing for Holland	(Italy) Beppe Gabbiani (Bolivia) Felipe Ortiz	Judd GV4 4.0L V10	D	102
3	**SR2**	**62**	**(United Kingdom) Team Sovereign**	**(United Kingdom) Mike Millard (United Kingdom) Ian Flux**	**Rapier 6**	A	**95**
3	**SR2**	**62**	**(United Kingdom) Team Sovereign**	**(United Kingdom) Mike Millard (United Kingdom) Ian Flux**	**Nissan (AER) VQL 3.0L V6**	A	**95**
4	SR2	99	(France) PiR Bruneau	(France) Pierre Bruneau (France) Marc Rostan	Pilbeam MP84	A	74
4	SR2	99	(France) PiR Bruneau	(France) Pierre Bruneau (France) Marc Rostan	Nissan 3.0L V6	A	74
DNF	SR2	52	(Italy) Lucchini Engineering	(Italy) Mirko Savoldi (Italy) Piergiuseppe Peroni	Lucchini SR2002	A	40
DNF	SR2	52	(Italy) Lucchini Engineering	(Italy) Mirko Savoldi (Italy) Piergiuseppe Peroni	Nissan (AER) VQL 3.0L V6	A	40
DNF	SR2	63	(Switzerland) Equipe Palmyr	(Switzerland) Philippe Favre (Switzerland) Christophe Ricard	Lucchini SR2000	A	40
DNF	SR2	63	(Switzerland) Equipe Palmyr	(Switzerland) Philippe Favre (Switzerland) Christophe Ricard	Alfa Romeo 3.0L V6	A	40
DNF	SR1	8	(Italy) Automotive Durango SRL	(Italy) Michele Rugolo (Italy) Leonardo Maddalena	Durango LMP1	D	8
DNF	SR1	8	(Italy) Automotive Durango SRL	(Italy) Michele Rugolo (Italy) Leonardo Maddalena	Judd GV4 4.0L V10	D	8

== Statistics ==
- Pole Position - #2 Racing for Holland - 1:23.235
- Fastest Lap - #2 Racing for Holland - 1:23.906
- Distance - 374.508 km
- Average Speed - 149.195 km/h

FIA Sportscar Championship
Previous race: 2003 1000 km of Spa	2003 season	Next race: None
