= 2003 FIA Sportscar Championship Donington =

Layout of the Donington Park

The 2003 FIA Sportscar Championship Donington was the fifth race for the 2003 FIA Sportscar Championship season held at Donington Park and ran for two hours and thirty minutes. It took place on August 10, 2003.

== Official results ==
Class winners in bold. Cars failing to complete 75% of winner's distance marked as Not Classified (NC).

Pos	Class	No	Team	Drivers	Chassis	Tyre	Laps
Pos	Class	No	Team	Drivers	Engine	Tyre	Laps
1	**SR1**	**1**	**(Netherlands) Racing for Holland**	**(Netherlands) Jan Lammers (Netherlands) John Bosch**	**Dome S101**	**D**	**97**
1	**SR1**	**1**	**(Netherlands) Racing for Holland**	**(Netherlands) Jan Lammers (Netherlands) John Bosch**	**Judd GV4 4.0L V10**	**D**	**97**
2	SR1	12	(Italy) Gianfranco Trombetti	(Italy) Alex Caffi (Italy) Enrico Muscioni	Promec PJ119	**G**	94
2	SR1	12	(Italy) Gianfranco Trombetti	(Italy) Alex Caffi (Italy) Enrico Muscioni	Peugeot A32 3.2L Turbo V6	**G**	94
3	**SR2**	**52**	**(Italy) Lucchini Engineering**	**(Italy) Mirko Savoldi (Italy) Piergiuseppe Peroni**	**Lucchini SR2002**	**A**	**93**
3	**SR2**	**52**	**(Italy) Lucchini Engineering**	**(Italy) Mirko Savoldi (Italy) Piergiuseppe Peroni**	**Nissan (AER) VQL 3.0L V6**	**A**	**93**
4	SR2	55	(Italy) GP Racing	(Italy) Fabio Mancini (Italy) Gianni Collini (Italy) Massimo Saccomanno	Lucchini SR2001	**A**	92
4	SR2	55	(Italy) GP Racing	(Italy) Fabio Mancini (Italy) Gianni Collini (Italy) Massimo Saccomanno	Alfa Romeo 3.0L V6	**A**	92
5	SR2	62	(United Kingdom) Team Sovereign	(United Kingdom) Ian Flux (United Kingdom) Mike Millard	Rapier 6	**A**	90
5	SR2	62	(United Kingdom) Team Sovereign	(United Kingdom) Ian Flux (United Kingdom) Mike Millard	Nissan (AER) VQL 3.0L V6	**A**	90
6	SR2	63	(Switzerland) Equipe Palmyr	(Switzerland) Christophe Ricard (Switzerland) Philippe Favre	Lucchini SR2000	**A**	90
6	SR2	63	(Switzerland) Equipe Palmyr	(Switzerland) Christophe Ricard (Switzerland) Philippe Favre	Alfa Romeo 3.0L V6	**A**	90
7	SR2	99	(France) PiR Bruneau	(France) Pierre Bruneau (France) Marc Rostan	Pilbeam MP84	**A**	71
7	SR2	99	(France) PiR Bruneau	(France) Pierre Bruneau (France) Marc Rostan	Nissan 3.0L V6	**A**	71
8	SR2	61	(United Kingdom) Team Jota	(United Kingdom) Sam Hignett (United Kingdom) John Stack	Pilbeam MP84	**A**	60
8	SR2	61	(United Kingdom) Team Jota	(United Kingdom) Sam Hignett (United Kingdom) John Stack	Nissan (AER) VQL 3.0L V6	**A**	60
DSQ	SR1	8	(Italy) Automotive Durango SRL	(Italy) Leonardo Maddalena (Italy) Michele Rugolo (Italy) Fulvio Cavicchi	Durango LMP1	**D**	59
DSQ	SR1	8	(Italy) Automotive Durango SRL	(Italy) Leonardo Maddalena (Italy) Michele Rugolo (Italy) Fulvio Cavicchi	Judd GV4 4.0L V10	**D**	59
DNF	SR1	28	(United Kingdom) Speedsport	(United Kingdom) Bob Berridge (United Kingdom) Amanda Stretton	Lola B98/10	?	88
DNF	SR1	28	(United Kingdom) Speedsport	(United Kingdom) Bob Berridge (United Kingdom) Amanda Stretton	Judd GV4 4.0L V10	?	88
DNF	SR1	5	(United Kingdom) RN Motorsport	(United Kingdom) Andy Wallace (Japan) Hayanari Shimoda	DBA4 03S	**D**	86
DNF	SR1	5	(United Kingdom) RN Motorsport	(United Kingdom) Andy Wallace (Japan) Hayanari Shimoda	Zytek ZG348 3.4L V8	**D**	86
DNF	SR1	21	(United Kingdom) Team Ascari	(Netherlands) Klaas Zwart (South Africa) Werner Lupberger	Ascari KZR-1	**D**	83
DNF	SR1	21	(United Kingdom) Team Ascari	(Netherlands) Klaas Zwart (South Africa) Werner Lupberger	Judd GV4 4.0L V10	**D**	83
DNF	SR1	11	(United Kingdom) Fred Goddard	(South Africa) Fred Goddard (United Kingdom) Steve Arnold	Reynard 01Q	**D**	63
DNF	SR1	11	(United Kingdom) Fred Goddard	(South Africa) Fred Goddard (United Kingdom) Steve Arnold	Ford Cosworth 3.4L V8	**D**	63
DNF	SR1	6	(United Kingdom) Taurus Sports Racing	(United Kingdom) Phil Andrews (United Kingdom) Justin Keen	Lola B2K/10	**D**	56
DNF	SR1	6	(United Kingdom) Taurus Sports Racing	(United Kingdom) Phil Andrews (United Kingdom) Justin Keen	Judd GV4 4.0L V10	**D**	56
DNF	SR1	2	(Netherlands) Racing for Holland	(Italy) Beppe Gabbiani (Bolivia) Felipe Ortiz	Dome S101	**D**	50
DNF	SR1	2	(Netherlands) Racing for Holland	(Italy) Beppe Gabbiani (Bolivia) Felipe Ortiz	Judd GV4 4.0L V10	**D**	50
DNF	SR1	16	(France) Pescarolo Sport	(France) Franck Lagorce (France) Stéphane Sarrazin	Courage C60	**G**	16
DNF	SR1	16	(France) Pescarolo Sport	(France) Franck Lagorce (France) Stéphane Sarrazin	Peugeot A32 3.2L Turbo V6	**G**	16

† - #8 was disqualified for being pushed back onto the track by a marshall.

== Statistics ==
- Pole Position - #5 RN Motorsport - 1:24.632
- Fastest Lap - #5 RN Motorsport - 1:27.194
- Distance - 390.266 km
- Average Speed - 155.479 km/h

FIA Sportscar Championship
Previous race: 2003 FIA Sportscar Championship Monza	2003 season	Next race: 2003 1000 km of Spa
