= 2003 FIA Sportscar Championship =

Seasons
- ← 2002 none →

The 2003 FIA Sportscar Championship was the third season of FIA Sportscar Championship, an auto racing series regulated by the Fédération Internationale de l'Automobile and organized by the International Racing Series Ltd. It was the seventh and final season of the series dating back to the International Sports Racing Series of 1997. The series featured sports prototypes divided into two categories, SR1 and SR2, and awarded championships for drivers, constructors, and teams in both classes. The series began on 13 April 2003 and ended on 21 September 2003 after seven races in Europe.

Jan Lammers of the Netherlands won his second consecutive drivers championship for his Racing for Holland Dome outfit, sharing the championship with countryman John Bosch. Mirko Savolid and Pierguiseppe Peroni also earned a repeat drivers championship in the SR2 category for Lucchini Engineering after winning in five of seven events.

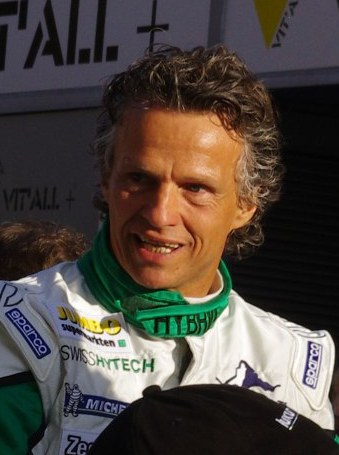
Jan Lammers (pictured in 2011) won the FIA Sportscar Championship for Drivers for the second consecutive year

== Schedule ==
The 2003 calendar for the championship featured seven events, six in the traditional 2-hour 30-minute format plus the addition of the 1000 km Spa run in conjunction with the British GT Championship, a return to the 1000 km format last utilized in 1988. Circuito do Estoril began the season in the first visit to Portugal for the series, while Autodromo Nazionale Monza and Donington Park both returned to the series with events held in conjunction with the International Formula 3000 series; Donington would also serve as the first race in the championship to be held at night. The EuroSpeedway Lausitz would share its event with the Champ Car World Series, while Circuit Paul Armagnac and Motopark Oschersleben were also new events to the series.

Rnd	Race	Circuit	Date
1	Estoril 2 Hours 30 Minutes	Autódromo do Estoril, Estoril, Portugal	13 April
2	German 500	EuroSpeedway Lausitz, Klettwitz, Germany	10 May
3	44th Gran Premio Lotteria di Monza	Autodromo Nazionale di Monza, Monza, Italy	29 June
4	Oschersleben 2 Hours 30 Minutes	Motopark Oschersleben, Oschersleben, Germany	20 July
5	European Race Weekend	Donington Park, North West Leicestershire, United Kingdom	10 August
6	1000 km Spa	Circuit de Spa-Francorchamps, Stavelot, Belgium	31 August
7	Nogaro 2 Hours 30 Minutes	Circuit Paul Armagnac, Nogaro, France	21 September

== Entries ==
=== SR1 ===
Entrant	Car	Engine	Tyre	No.	Drivers	Rounds
(Netherlands) Racing for Holland	Dome S101	Judd GV4 4.0 L V10	G D	1	(Netherlands) Jan Lammers	1–6
(Netherlands) Racing for Holland	Dome S101	Judd GV4 4.0 L V10	G D	1	(Netherlands) John Bosch	1–6
(Netherlands) Racing for Holland	Dome S101	Judd GV4 4.0 L V10	G D	2	(Italy) Beppe Gabbiani	All
(Netherlands) Racing for Holland	Dome S101	Judd GV4 4.0 L V10	G D	2	(Bolivia) Filipe Ortiz	All
(Monaco) GLV Racing	Ferrari 333 SP	Judd GV4 4.0 L V10	G	3	(Italy) Giovanni Lavaggi	2–3
(Monaco) GLV Racing	Ferrari 333 SP	Judd GV4 4.0 L V10	G	3	(France) Xavier Pompidou	2–3
(Denmark) RN Motorsport	DBA4 03S	Zytek ZG348 3.4 L V8	D	5	(Japan) Hayanari Shimoda	1, 4–6
(Denmark) RN Motorsport	DBA4 03S	Zytek ZG348 3.4 L V8	D	5	(Denmark) John Nielsen	1
(Denmark) RN Motorsport	DBA4 03S	Zytek ZG348 3.4 L V8	D	5	(United Kingdom) Andy Wallace	4–6
(United Kingdom) Taurus Sports Racing	Lola B2K/10	Judd GV4 4.0 L V10	D	6	(United Kingdom) Christian Vann	1, 3
(United Kingdom) Taurus Sports Racing	Lola B2K/10	Judd GV4 4.0 L V10	D	6	(United Kingdom) Justin Keen	1, 5–6
(United Kingdom) Taurus Sports Racing	Lola B2K/10	Judd GV4 4.0 L V10	D	6	(United Kingdom) Phil Andrews	3, 5
(United Kingdom) Taurus Sports Racing	Lola B2K/10	Judd GV4 4.0 L V10	D	6	(Italy) Giovanni Lavaggi	6
(United Kingdom) Taurus Sports Racing	Lola B2K/10	Judd GV4 4.0 L V10	D	6	(United States) Larry Oberto	6
(Italy) Automotive Durango	Durango LMP1	Judd GV4 4.0 L V10	D	8	(Italy) Michele Rugolo	1–5, 7
(Italy) Automotive Durango	Durango LMP1	Judd GV4 4.0 L V10	D	8	(Italy) Leonardo Maddalena	1–5, 7
(Italy) Automotive Durango	Durango LMP1	Judd GV4 4.0 L V10	D	8	(Italy) Fulvio Cavicchi	3–5
(United Kingdom) Earl Goddard	Reynard 01Q	Ford Cosworth 3.4 L V8	D	11	(South Africa) Earl Goddard	3, 5
(United Kingdom) Earl Goddard	Reynard 01Q	Ford Cosworth 3.4 L V8	D	11	(United Kingdom) Steve Arnold	3, 5
(Italy) Gianfranco Trombetti	Promec PJ119	Peugeot A32 3.2 L Turbo V6	G	12	(Italy) "Gianfranco"	1, 3, 5
(Italy) Gianfranco Trombetti	Promec PJ119	Peugeot A32 3.2 L Turbo V6	G	12	(Italy) Alex Caffi	1, 3, 5
(Italy) Gianfranco Trombetti	Promec PJ119	Peugeot A32 3.2 L Turbo V6	G	12	(Italy) Enrico Muscioni	5
(France) Pescarolo Sport	Courage C60	Peugeot A32 3.2 L Turbo V6	G M	16	(France) Jean-Christophe Boullion	1, 3
(France) Pescarolo Sport	Courage C60	Peugeot A32 3.2 L Turbo V6	G M	16	(France) Stéphane Sarrazin	1, 5–6
(France) Pescarolo Sport	Courage C60	Peugeot A32 3.2 L Turbo V6	G M	16	(France) Franck Lagorce	3, 5–7
(France) Pescarolo Sport	Courage C60	Peugeot A32 3.2 L Turbo V6	G M	16	(France) Nicolas Minassian	4
(France) Pescarolo Sport	Courage C60	Peugeot A32 3.2 L Turbo V6	G M	16	(France) Eric Hélary	4
(France) Pescarolo Sport	Courage C60	Peugeot A32 3.2 L Turbo V6	G M	16	(France) Soheil Ayari	7
(United Kingdom) Team Ascari	Ascari KZR-1	Judd GV4 4.0 L V10	D	21	(Netherlands) Klaas Zwart	3, 5
(United Kingdom) Team Ascari	Ascari KZR-1	Judd GV4 4.0 L V10	D	21	(South Africa) Werner Lupberger	3, 5
(United Kingdom) Team Ascari	Ascari KZR-1	Judd GV4 4.0 L V10	D	21	(United Kingdom) Charles Hall	3
(Italy) R&M	R&M SR01	Judd GV4 4.0 L V10	G	22	(Italy) Mauro Baldi	3
(Italy) R&M	R&M SR01	Judd GV4 4.0 L V10	G	22	(Italy) Filippo Francioni	3
(Italy) R&M	R&M SR01	Judd GV4 4.0 L V10	G	22	(Italy) Ezio Mazza	3
Audi Sport Japan	Audi R8	Audi 3.6 L Turbo V8	M	25	(Denmark) Tom Kristensen	6
Audi Sport Japan	Audi R8	Audi 3.6 L Turbo V8	M	25	(Japan) Seiji Ara	6
(United Kingdom) Speedsport	Lola B98/10	Judd GV4 4.0 L V10	G	28	(United Kingdom) Bob Berridge	5
(United Kingdom) Speedsport	Lola B98/10	Judd GV4 4.0 L V10	G	28	(United Kingdom) Amanda Stretton	5

=== SR2 ===
All SR2 competitors used Avon tyres.

Entrant	Car	Engine	No.	Drivers	Rounds
(Italy) Lucchini Engineering	Lucchini SR2002	Nissan VQL 3.0 L V6	52	(Italy) Mirko Savoldi	All
(Italy) Lucchini Engineering	Lucchini SR2002	Nissan VQL 3.0 L V6	52	(Italy) Pieuguiseppe Peroni	All
(Italy) Lucchini Engineering	Lucchini SR2002	Nissan VQL 3.0 L V6	52	(Italy) Filippo Francioni	6
(Italy) Ranieri Randaccio	Lucchini SR2000	Alfa Romeo 3.0 L V6	54	(Italy) Ranieri Randaccio	1, 3
(Italy) Ranieri Randaccio	Lucchini SR2000	Alfa Romeo 3.0 L V6	54	(United Kingdom) Paul Daniels	1
(Italy) Ranieri Randaccio	Lucchini SR2000	Alfa Romeo 3.0 L V6	54	(Italy) Jacopo Sebastiani	3
(Italy) GP Racing	Lucchini SR2001	Alfa Romeo 3.0 L V6	55	(Italy) Fabio Mancini	1–6
(Italy) GP Racing	Lucchini SR2001	Alfa Romeo 3.0 L V6	55	(Italy) Gianni Collini	1–6
(Italy) GP Racing	Lucchini SR2001	Alfa Romeo 3.0 L V6	55	(Italy) Massimo Saccomanno	1–6
(United Kingdom) Team Jota	Pilbeam MP84	Nissan VQL 3.0 L V6	61	(United Kingdom) Sam Hignett	1–6
(United Kingdom) Team Jota	Pilbeam MP84	Nissan VQL 3.0 L V6	61	(United Kingdom) John Stack	1–6
(United Kingdom) Team Jota	Pilbeam MP84	Nissan VQL 3.0 L V6	61	(United Kingdom) Nigel Taylor	6
(United Kingdom) Team Sovereign	Rapier 6	Nissan VQL 3.0 L V6	62	(United Kingdom) Ian Flux	5, 7
(United Kingdom) Team Sovereign	Rapier 6	Nissan VQL 3.0 L V6	62	(United Kingdom) Mike Millard	5, 7
(Switzerland) Palmyr	Lucchini SR2000	Alfa Romeo 3.0 L V6	63	(Switzerland) Christophe Ricard	5–7
(Switzerland) Palmyr	Lucchini SR2000	Alfa Romeo 3.0 L V6	63	(Switzerland) Philippe Favre	5–7
(France) Pierre Bruneau	Pilbeam MP84	Nissan VQL 3.0 L V6	99	(France) Pierre Bruneau	All
(France) Pierre Bruneau	Pilbeam MP84	Nissan VQL 3.0 L V6	99	(France) Marc Rostan	All

== Results and standings ==
=== Race results ===
Rnd	Circuit	SR1 Winning Team	SR2 Winning Team	Report
Rnd	Circuit	SR1 Winning Drivers	SR2 Winning Drivers	Report
1	Estoril	(France) No. 16 Pescarolo Sport	(Italy) No. 52 Lucchini Engineering	Report
1	Estoril	(France) Jean-Christophe Boullion (France) Stéphane Sarrazin	(Italy) Mirko Savoldi (Italy) Piergiuseppe Peroni	Report
2	Lausitz	(Netherlands) No. 1 Racing for Holland	(Italy) No. 52 Lucchini Engineering	Report
2	Lausitz	(Netherlands) Jan Lammers (Netherlands) John Bosch	(Italy) Mirko Savoldi (Italy) Piergiuseppe Peroni	Report
3	Monza	(Netherlands) No. 1 Racing for Holland	(United Kingdom) No. 61 Team Jota	Report
3	Monza	(Netherlands) Jan Lammers (Netherlands) John Bosch	(United Kingdom) John Stack (United Kingdom) Sam Hignett	Report
4	Oschersleben	(United Kingdom) No. 5 RN Motorsport	(Italy) No. 52 Lucchini Engineering	Report
4	Oschersleben	(United Kingdom) Andy Wallace (Japan) Hayanari Shimoda	(Italy) Mirko Savoldi (Italy) Piergiuseppe Peroni	Report
5	Donington	(Netherlands) No. 1 Racing for Holland	(Italy) No. 52 Lucchini Engineering	Report
5	Donington	(Netherlands) Jan Lammers (Netherlands) John Bosch	(Italy) Mirko Savoldi (Italy) Piergiuseppe Peroni	Report
6	Spa	No. 25 Audi Sport Japan	(Italy) No. 52 Lucchini Engineering	Report
6	Spa	(Denmark) Tom Kristensen (Japan) Seiji Ara	(Italy) Mirko Savoldi (Italy) Piergiuseppe Peroni (Italy) Filippo Francioni	Report
7	Nogaro	(France) No. 16 Pescarolo Sport	(United Kingdom) No. 52 Team Sovereign	Report
7	Nogaro	(France) Franck Lagorce (France) Soheil Ayari	(United Kingdom) Ian Flux (United Kingdom) Mike Millard	Report

Points were awarded to the top eight finishers in each category. Entries were required to complete 60% of the race distance in order to be classified as a finisher and earn points. Drivers were required to complete 20% of the total race distance for their car to earn points. Teams scored points for only their highest finishing entry. For the 1000 km Spa points were also awarded to the top eight in each category at half distance.

Points system
Event	1st	2nd	3rd	4th	5th	6th	7th	8th
Races	10	8	6	5	4	3	2	1

=== Driver championships ===
==== SR1 championship ====
Pos.	Driver	Team	EST (Portugal)	LAU (Germany)	MON (Italy)	OSC (Germany)	DON (United Kingdom)	SPA (Belgium)		NOG (France)	Total points
Pos.	Driver	Team	EST (Portugal)	LAU (Germany)	MON (Italy)	OSC (Germany)	DON (United Kingdom)	500 km	1000 km	NOG (France)	Total points
1	(Netherlands) Jan Lammers	(Netherlands) Racing for Holland	3	1	1	2	1	Ret	Ret		44
1	(Netherlands) John Bosch	(Netherlands) Racing for Holland	3	1	1	2	1	Ret	Ret		44
2	(Italy) Beppe Gabbiani	(Netherlands) Racing for Holland	5	2	Ret	3	Ret	5	3	2	36
2	(Bolivia) Filipe Ortiz	(Netherlands) Racing for Holland	5	2	Ret	3	Ret	5	3	2	36
3	(Japan) Hayanari Shimoda	(Denmark) RN Motorsport	2			1	Ret	2	Ret		26
4	(France) Stéphane Sarrazin	(France) Pescarolo Sport	1				Ret	3	2		24
4	(France) Franck Lagorce	(France) Pescarolo Sport			Ret		Ret	3	2	1	24
5	(Denmark) Tom Kristensen	Audi Sport Japan						1	1		20
5	(Japan) Seiji Ara	Audi Sport Japan						1	1		20
6	(United Kingdom) Andy Wallace	(Denmark) RN Motorsport				1	Ret	2	Ret		18
7	(Italy) Giovanni Lavaggi	(Monaco) GLV Racing		3	Ret						16
7	(Italy) Giovanni Lavaggi	(United Kingdom) Taurus Sports Racing						4	4		16
8	(Italy) Gianfranco Trombetti	(Italy) Gianfranco Trombetti	6		Ret		2				11
8	(Italy) Alex Caffi	(Italy) Gianfranco Trombetti	6		Ret		2				11
9	(France) Jean-Christophe Boullion	(France) Pescarolo Sport	1		Ret						10
9	(France) Soheil Ayari	(France) Pescarolo Sport								1	10
10	(Italy) Michele Rugolo	(Italy) Automotive Durango	4	Ret	Ret	4	DSQ			Ret	10
10	(Italy) Leonardo Maddalena	(Italy) Automotive Durango	4	Ret	Ret	4	DSQ			Ret	10
11	(United Kingdom) Justin Keen	(United Kingdom) Taurus Sports Racing	DNS				Ret	4	4		10
11	(United States) Larry Oberto	(United Kingdom) Taurus Sports Racing						4	4		10
12	(Denmark) John Nielsen	(Denmark) RN Motorsport	2								8
12	(Netherlands) Klaas Zwart	(United Kingdom) Team Ascari			2		Ret				8
12	(South Africa) Werner Lupberger	(United Kingdom) Team Ascari			2		Ret				8
12	(United Kingdom) Charles Hall	(United Kingdom) Team Ascari			2						8
12	(Italy) Enrico Muscioni	(Italy) Gianfranco Trombetti					2				8
13	(France) Xavier Pompidou	(Monaco) GLV Racing		3	Ret						6
13	(United Kingdom) Christian Vann	(United Kingdom) Taurus Sports Racing	DNS		3						6
13	(United Kingdom) Phil Andrews	(United Kingdom) Taurus Sports Racing			3		Ret				6
14	(Italy) Mauro Baldi	(Italy) R&M			4						5
14	(Italy) Filippo Francioni	(Italy) R&M			4						5
14	(Italy) Ezio Mazza	(Italy) R&M			4						5
14	(Italy) Fulvio Cavicchi	(Italy) Automotive Durango			Ret	4	DSQ				5
15	(South Africa) Earl Goddard	(United Kingdom) Earl Goddard			5						4
15	(United Kingdom) Steve Arnold	(United Kingdom) Earl Goddard			5						4

Colour	Result
Gold	Winner
Silver	Second place
Bronze	Third place
Green	Points classification
Blue	Non-points classification
Blue	Non-classified finish (NC)
Purple	Retired, not classified (Ret)
Red	Did not qualify (DNQ)
Red	Did not pre-qualify (DNPQ)
Black	Disqualified (DSQ)
White	Did not start (DNS)
White	Withdrew (WD)
White	Race cancelled (C)
Blank	Did not practice (DNP)
Blank	Did not arrive (DNA)
Blank	Excluded (EX)

==== SR2 championship ====
Pos.	Driver	Team	EST (Portugal)	LAU (Germany)	MON (Italy)	OSC (Germany)	DON (United Kingdom)	SPA (Belgium)		NOG (France)	Total points
Pos.	Driver	Team	EST (Portugal)	LAU (Germany)	MON (Italy)	OSC (Germany)	DON (United Kingdom)	500 km	1000 km	NOG (France)	Total points
1	(Italy) Mirko Savoldi	(Italy) Lucchini Engineering	1	1	Ret	1	1	1	1	Ret	60
1	(Italy) Pierguiseppe Peroni	(Italy) Lucchini Engineering	1	1	Ret	1	1	1	1	Ret	60
2	(France) Pierre Bruneau	(France) Pierre Bruneau	NC	3	Ret	2	5	3	NC	2	32
2	(France) Marc Rostan	(France) Pierre Bruneau	NC	3	Ret	2	5	3	NC	2	32
3	(Italy) Fabio Mancini	(Italy) GP Racing	2	2	Ret	NC	2	Ret	Ret		24
3	(Italy) Gianni Collini	(Italy) GP Racing	2	2	Ret	NC	2	Ret	Ret		24
3	(Italy) Massimo Saccomanno	(Italy) GP Racing	2	2	Ret	NC	2	Ret	Ret		24
4	(United Kingdom) Sam Hignett	(United Kingdom) Team Jota	4	4	1	Ret	6	Ret	Ret		23
4	(United Kingdom) John Stack	(United Kingdom) Team Jota	4	4	1	Ret	6	Ret	Ret		23
5	(Switzerland) Philippe Favre	(Switzerland) Palmyr					4	2	2	Ret	21
5	(Switzerland) Christophe Ricard	(Switzerland) Palmyr					4	2	2	Ret	21
6	(Italy) Filippo Francioni	(Italy) Lucchini Engineering						1	1		20
7	(United Kingdom) Ian Flux	(United Kingdom) Team Sovereign					3			1	16
7	(United Kingdom) Mike Millard	(United Kingdom) Team Sovereign					3			1	16
8	(Italy) Ranieri Randaccio	(Italy) Ranieri Randaccio	3		2						14
9	(Italy) Jacopo Sebastiani	(Italy) Ranieri Randaccio			2						8
10	(United Kingdom) Paul Daniels	(Italy) Ranieri Randaccio	3								6

=== Team championships ===
==== SR1 championship ====
Pos.	Team	EST (Portugal)	LAU (Germany)	MON (Italy)	OSC (Germany)	DON (United Kingdom)	SPA (Belgium)		NOG (France)	Total points
Pos.	Team	EST (Portugal)	LAU (Germany)	MON (Italy)	OSC (Germany)	DON (United Kingdom)	500 km	1000 km	NOG (France)	Total points
1	(Netherlands) Racing for Holland	3	1	1	2	1	5	3	2	62
2	(France) Pescarolo Sport	1		Ret	Ret	Ret	3	2	1	34
3	(Denmark) RN Motorsport	2			1	Ret	2	Ret		26
4	Audi Sport Japan						1	1		20
5	(United Kingdom) Taurus Sports Racing	DNS		3		Ret	4	4		16
6	(Italy) Gianfranco Trombetti	6		Ret		2				11
7	(Italy) Automotive Durango	4	Ret	Ret	4	DSQ			Ret	10
8	(United Kingdom) Team Ascari			2		Ret				8
9	(Monaco) GLV Racing		3	Ret						6
10	(Italy) R&M			4						5
11	(United Kingdom) Earl Goddard			5						4

==== SR2 championship ====
Pos.	Team	EST (Portugal)	LAU (Germany)	MON (Italy)	OSC (Germany)	DON (United Kingdom)	SPA (Belgium)		NOG (France)	Total points
Pos.	Team	EST (Portugal)	LAU (Germany)	MON (Italy)	OSC (Germany)	DON (United Kingdom)	500 km	1000 km	NOG (France)	Total points
1	(Italy) Lucchini Engineering	1	1	Ret	1	1	1	1	Ret	60
2	(France) Pierre Bruneau	NC	3	Ret	2	5	3	NC	2	32
3	(Italy) GP Racing	2	2	Ret	NC	2	Ret	Ret		24
4	(United Kingdom) Team Jota	4	4	1	Ret	6	Ret	Ret		23
5	(Switzerland) Palmyr					4	2	2	Ret	21
6	(United Kingdom) Team Sovereign					3			1	16
7	(Italy) Ranieri Randaccio	3		2						14

=== Constructors championships ===
Constructor champions are open to chassis constructors only. Engine manufacturers are not considered in the constructor entries.

==== SR1 championship ====
Pos.	Constructor	EST (Portugal)	LAU (Germany)	MON (Italy)	OSC (Germany)	DON (United Kingdom)	SPA (Belgium)		NOG (France)	Total points
Pos.	Constructor	EST (Portugal)	LAU (Germany)	MON (Italy)	OSC (Germany)	DON (United Kingdom)	500 km	1000 km	NOG (France)	Total points
1	Dome	3	1	1	2	1	5	3	2	62
2	Courage	1		Ret	Ret	Ret	3	2	1	34
3	DBA	2			1	Ret	2	Ret		26
4	Audi						1	1		20
5	Lola	DNS		3		Ret	4	4		16
6	Promec	6		Ret		2				11
7	Durango	4	Ret	Ret	4	DSQ			Ret	10
8	Ascari			2		Ret				8
9	Ferrari		3	Ret						6
10	R&M			4						5
11	Reynard			5						4

==== SR2 championship ====
Pos.	Constructor	EST (Portugal)	LAU (Germany)	MON (Italy)	OSC (Germany)	DON (United Kingdom)	SPA (Belgium)		NOG (France)	Total points
Pos.	Constructor	EST (Portugal)	LAU (Germany)	MON (Italy)	OSC (Germany)	DON (United Kingdom)	500 km	1000 km	NOG (France)	Total points
1	Lucchini	1	1	2	1	1	1	1	Ret	68
2	Pilbeam	4	3	1	2	5	3	NC	2	48
3	Rapier					3			1	16
