= 6 Hours of Donington =

European Le Mans Series
- Venue: Donington Park
- First race: 1989
- First ELMS race: 2006
- Last race: 2012
- Duration: 6 hours
- Most wins (driver): Jean-Louis Schlesser (3); Mauro Baldi (3); Emmanuel Collard (3)
- Most wins (team): Team Sauber Mercedes (2); JB-Giesse Team Ferrari (2)
- Most wins (manufacturer): Sauber-Mercedes (2); Ferrari (2)

The 6 Hours of Donington is a sports car race held at Donington Park in the United Kingdom. The event has been held sporadically since 1989.

== Results ==
Year	Overall winner(s)	Entrant	Car	Distance/Duration	Race title	Series	Report
1989	(France) Jean-Louis Schlesser (West Germany) Jochen Mass	(West Germany) Team Sauber Mercedes	Sauber Mercedes C9	480 km (300 mi)	Wheatcroft Gold Cup	World Sportscar Championship	report
1990	(France) Jean-Louis Schlesser (Italy) Mauro Baldi	(West Germany) Team Sauber Mercedes	Mercedes-Benz C11	480 km (300 mi)	Shell Donington Trophy	World Sportscar Championship	report
1991	Not held						
1992	(Italy) Mauro Baldi (France) Philippe Alliot	(France) Peugeot Talbot Sport	Peugeot 905 Evo 1 Bis	500 km (310 mi)	Triton Showers Trophy	World Sportscar Championship	report
1993 to 1996	Not held						
1997	(Sweden) Stefan Johansson (Italy) Pierluigi Martini	(Germany) Joest Racing	TWR-Joest Porsche WSC95	2 hours	Donington 2 Hours	International Sports Racing Series	report
1998	(Italy) Vincenzo Sospiri (France) Emmanuel Collard	(France) JB-Giesse Team Ferrari	Ferrari 333 SP	2 hours, 30 minutes	RAC Tourist Trophy	International Sports Racing Series	report
1999	(France) Jean-Marc Gounon (France) Éric Bernard	(France) DAMS Team	Lola B98/10-Judd	2 hours, 30 minutes	The Very Fast Show	Sports Racing World Cup	report
2000	(Italy) Christian Pescatori (France) David Terrien	(France) JB-Giesse Team Ferrari	Ferrari 333 SP	2 hours, 30 minutes	SportsRacing World Cup Donington	Sports Racing World Cup	report
2001	(Denmark) Tom Kristensen (Italy) Rinaldo Capello	(Germany) Audi Sport Team Joest	Audi R8	2 hours, 45 minutes	ELMS Race at Donington Park	European Le Mans Series; American Le Mans Series	report
2001	(United Kingdom) Ben Collins (South Africa) Werner Lupberger	(United Kingdom) Team Ascari	Ascari A410-Judd	2 hours, 30 minutes	August Bank Holiday Donington Park	FIA Sportscar Championship	report
2002	Not held						
2003	(Netherlands) Jan Lammers (Netherlands) John Bosch	(Netherlands) Racing for Holland	Dome S101-Judd	2 hours, 30 minutes	FIA Sportscar Championship Donington Park	FIA Sportscar Championship	report
2004 to 2005	Not held						
2006	(France) Emmanuel Collard (France) Jean-Christophe Boullion (France) Didier André	(France) Pescarolo Sport	Pescarolo C60-Judd	1,000 km (620 mi)	1000 Kilometres of Donington	Le Mans Series	report
2007 to 2011	Not Held						
2012	(France) Olivier Pla (France) Dimitri Enjalbert (Belgium) Bertrand Baguette	(France) OAK Racing	Morgan LMP2-Nissan	6 Hours	6 Hours of Donington	European Le Mans Series	report
