= 2003 FIA Sportscar Championship Oschersleben =

Layout of the Motorsport Arena Oschersleben

The 2003 FIA Sportscar Championship Oschersleben was the fourth race for the 2003 FIA Sportscar Championship season held at Motorsport Arena Oschersleben and ran for two hours and thirty minutes. It took place on July 20, 2003.

== Official results ==
Class winners in bold. Cars failing to complete 75% of winner's distance marked as Not Classified (NC).

Pos	Class	No	Team	Drivers	Chassis	Tyre	Laps
Pos	Class	No	Team	Drivers	Engine	Tyre	Laps
1	**SR1**	**5**	**(United Kingdom) RN Motorsport**	**(United Kingdom) Andy Wallace (Japan) Hayanari Shimoda**	**DBA4 03S**	D	**104**
1	**SR1**	**5**	**(United Kingdom) RN Motorsport**	**(United Kingdom) Andy Wallace (Japan) Hayanari Shimoda**	**Zytek ZG348 3.4L V8**	D	**104**
2	SR1	1	(Netherlands) Racing for Holland	(Netherlands) Jan Lammers (Netherlands) John Bosch	Dome S101	D	101
2	SR1	1	(Netherlands) Racing for Holland	(Netherlands) Jan Lammers (Netherlands) John Bosch	Judd GV4 4.0L V10	D	101
3	SR1	2	(Netherlands) Racing for Holland	(Italy) Beppe Gabbiani (Bolivia) Felipe Ortiz	Dome S101	D	100
3	SR1	2	(Netherlands) Racing for Holland	(Italy) Beppe Gabbiani (Bolivia) Felipe Ortiz	Judd GV4 4.0L V10	D	100
4	**SR2**	**52**	**(Italy) Lucchini Engineering**	**(Italy) Mirko Savoldi (Italy) Piergiuseppe Pironi**	**Lucchini SR2002**	A	**99**
4	**SR2**	**52**	**(Italy) Lucchini Engineering**	**(Italy) Mirko Savoldi (Italy) Piergiuseppe Pironi**	**Nissan (AER) 3.0L V6**	A	**99**
5	SR2	99	(France) Pierre Bruneau	(France) Pierre Bruneau (France) Marc Rostan	Pilbeam MP84	A	90
5	SR2	99	(France) Pierre Bruneau	(France) Pierre Bruneau (France) Marc Rostan	Nissan 3.0L V6	A	90
6	SR1	8	(Italy) Automotive Durango SRL	(Italy) Michele Rugolo (Italy) Leonardo Maddalena	Durango LMP1	D	83
6	SR1	8	(Italy) Automotive Durango SRL	(Italy) Michele Rugolo (Italy) Leonardo Maddalena	Judd GV4 4.0L V10	D	83
NC	SR2	55	(Italy) GP Racing	(Italy) Massimo Saccomanno (Italy) Gianni Collini	Lucchini SR2001	A	58
NC	SR2	55	(Italy) GP Racing	(Italy) Massimo Saccomanno (Italy) Gianni Collini	Alfa Romeo 3.0L V6	A	58
DNF	SR2	61	(United Kingdom) Team Jota	(United Kingdom) Sam Hignett (United Kingdom) John Stack	Pilbeam MP84	A	93
DNF	SR2	61	(United Kingdom) Team Jota	(United Kingdom) Sam Hignett (United Kingdom) John Stack	Nissan (AER) 3.0L V6	A	93
DNF	SR1	16	(France) Pescarolo Sport	(France) Éric Hélary (France) Nicolas Minassian	Courage C60	G	70
DNF	SR1	16	(France) Pescarolo Sport	(France) Éric Hélary (France) Nicolas Minassian	Peugeot A32 3.2L Turbo V6	G	70

== Statistics ==
- Pole Position - #5 RN Motorsport - 1:18.894
- Fastest Lap - #5 RN Motorsport - 1:21.377
- Distance - 381.368 km
- Average Speed - 152.045 km/h

FIA Sportscar Championship
Previous race: 2003 FIA Sportscar Championship Monza	2003 season	Next race: 2003 FIA Sportscar Championship Donington
