= 2003 FIA Sportscar Championship Lausitz =

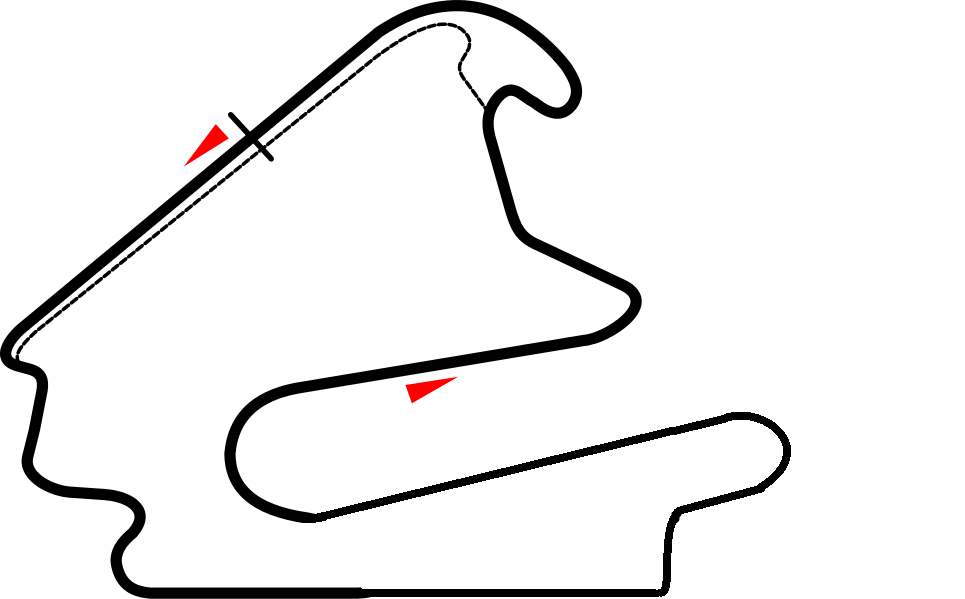
Layout of the EuroSpeedway Lausitz GP circuit

The 2003 FIA Sportscar Championship Lausitz was the second race for the 2003 FIA Sportscar Championship season held at EuroSpeedway Lausitz and ran a distance of two hours, thirty minutes. It took place on May 10, 2003.

This race was run in support for the Champ Car German 500.

== Official results ==
Class winners in bold. Cars failing to complete 75% of winner's distance marked as Not Classified (NC).

Pos	Class	No	Team	Drivers	Chassis	Tyre	Laps
Pos	Class	No	Team	Drivers	Engine	Tyre	Laps
1	**SR1**	**1**	**(Netherlands) Racing for Holland**	**(Netherlands) Jan Lammers (Netherlands) John Bosch**	**Dome S101**	G	**87**
1	**SR1**	**1**	**(Netherlands) Racing for Holland**	**(Netherlands) Jan Lammers (Netherlands) John Bosch**	**Judd GV4 4.0L V10**	G	**87**
2	SR1	2	(Netherlands) Racing for Holland	(Italy) Beppe Gabbiani (Bolivia) Felipe Ortiz	Dome S101	G	85
2	SR1	2	(Netherlands) Racing for Holland	(Italy) Beppe Gabbiani (Bolivia) Felipe Ortiz	Judd GV4 4.0L V10	G	85
3	**SR2**	**52**	**(Italy) Lucchini Engineering**	**(Italy) Mirko Savoldi (Italy) Piergiuseppe Peroni**	**Lucchini SR2002**	A	**84**
3	**SR2**	**52**	**(Italy) Lucchini Engineering**	**(Italy) Mirko Savoldi (Italy) Piergiuseppe Peroni**	**Nissan (AER) VQL 3.0L V6**	A	**84**
4	SR2	55	(Italy) GP Racing	(Italy) Gianni Collini (Italy) Fabio Mancini	Lucchini SR2001	A	83
4	SR2	55	(Italy) GP Racing	(Italy) Gianni Collini (Italy) Fabio Mancini	Alfa Romeo 3.0L V6	A	83
5	SR2	99	(France) PiR Bruneau	(France) Pierre Bruneau (France) Marc Rostan	Pilbeam MP84	A	81
5	SR2	99	(France) PiR Bruneau	(France) Pierre Bruneau (France) Marc Rostan	Nissan 3.0L V6	A	81
6	SR1	3	(Monaco) GLV Brums	(France) Xavier Pompidou (Italy) Giovanni Lavaggi	Ferrari 333 SP	G	77
6	SR1	3	(Monaco) GLV Brums	(France) Xavier Pompidou (Italy) Giovanni Lavaggi	Judd GV4 4.0L V10	G	77
7	SR2	61	(United Kingdom) Team Jota	(United Kingdom) John Stack (United Kingdom) Sam Hignett	Pilbeam MP84	A	71
7	SR2	61	(United Kingdom) Team Jota	(United Kingdom) John Stack (United Kingdom) Sam Hignett	Nissan (AER) VQL 3.0L V6	A	71
DNF	SR1	8	(Italy) Automotive Durango SRL	(Italy) Leonardo Maddalena (Italy) Michele Rugolo	Durango LMP1	D	66
DNF	SR1	8	(Italy) Automotive Durango SRL	(Italy) Leonardo Maddalena (Italy) Michele Rugolo	Judd GV4 4.0L V10	D	66

== Statistics ==
- Pole Position - #1 Racing for Holland - 1:38.173
- Distance - 394.458 km
- Average Speed - 156.707 km/h

FIA Sportscar Championship
Previous race: 2003 FIA Sportscar Championship Estoril	2003 season	Next race: 2003 FIA Sportscar Championship Monza
