= 4 Hours of Estoril =

Sports car endurance race

4 Horas do Estoril

European Le Mans Series
- Venue: Autódromo do Estoril
- First race: 1977
- First ELMS race: 2014
- Last race: 2016
- Duration: 4 hours
- Most wins (driver): Jean-Christophe Boullion (2)
- Most wins (team): Pescarolo Sport (3)
- Most wins (manufacturer): Courage (2)

The 4 Hours of Estoril was a sports car endurance race held at the Autódromo do Estoril in Estoril, on the Portuguese Riviera. The race was first held in 1977 as a round of the World Sportscar Championship. It was revived in 2001 for the European Le Mans Series as a 6-hour race, and continued until 2003 under the FIA Sportscar Championship. Between 2014 and 2016, the race was a part of the European Le Mans Series, in the format of 4 hours.

== Results ==
| Year | Overall winner(s) | Entrant | Car | Distance/Duration | Race title | Series | Report |
|---|---|---|---|---|---|---|---|
| 1977 | (Italy) Arturo Merzario | (Italy) Autodelta | Alfa Romeo T33/SC/12 | 2 hours, 30 minutes | Prémio International da Costa do Sol | World Sportscar Championship (Group 6) | report |
1978–2000: Not held
| 2001 | (France) Jean-Christophe Boullion (France) Laurent Rédon (France) Boris Derichebourg | (France) Pescarolo Sport | Courage C60-Peugeot | 1,000 km (620 mi) | Estoril 1000 Kilometres | European Le Mans Series | report |
| 2002 | (Monaco) Olivier Beretta (France) Nicolas Minassian | (France) Team Oreca | Dallara LMP-Judd | 2 hours, 30 minutes | FIA Sportscar Championship Estoril | FIA Sportscar Championship | report |
| 2003 | (France) Jean-Christophe Boullion (France) Stéphane Sarrazin | (France) Pescarolo Sport | Courage C60 EVO-Peugeot | 2 hours, 30 minutes | FIA Sportscar Championship Estoril | FIA Sportscar Championship | report |
2004–2010: Not held
| 2011 | (France) Emmanuel Collard (France) Julien Jousse | (France) Pescarolo Team | Pescarolo 01 Evo-Judd | 6 hours | 6 Hours of Estoril | Le Mans Series | report |
2012–2013: Not held
| 2014 | (France) Vincent Capillaire (Sweden) Jimmy Eriksson | (France) Sébastien Loeb Racing | Oreca 03 Nissan VK45DE 4.5 L V8 | 4 hours | 4 Hours of Estoril | European Le Mans Series | report |
| 2015 | (France) Pierre Thiriet (France) Ludovic Badey (France) Nicolas Lapierre | (France) Thiriet by TDS Racing | Oreca 05 Nissan VK45DE 4.5 L V8 | 4 hours | 4 Hours of Estoril | European Le Mans Series | report |
| 2016 | (United Kingdom) Simon Dolan (Netherlands) Giedo van der Garde (United Kingdom) Harry Tincknell | (Russia) G-Drive Racing | Gibson 015S Nissan VK45DE 4.5 L V8 | 4 hours | 4 Hours of Estoril | European Le Mans Series | report |
