= Rapier 6 =

Rapier 6 Rapier SR2
- Category: SRL/SR2
- Constructor: LM3000

Technical specifications
- Chassis: Aluminium honeycomb
- Engine: Nissan 3,000 cc (183.1 cu in) V6, naturally aspirated, mid engined
- Tyres: Dunlop

Competition history
- Notable entrants: Team Sovereign; Flat Six Motorsport
- Notable drivers: Mike Millard; Ian Flux; Ian Heward
- Debut: 2000 SportsRacing World Cup Donington
Races	Wins	Poles
28 (26 starts, 37 entries)	1 (2 class)	3
- Teams' Championships: 0
- Constructors' Championships: 0
- Drivers' Championships: 0

The Rapier 6 (also known as the Rapier SR2) was a sports prototype racing car built by LM3000 in 1999. It used a 3-litre Nissan V6 engine, and Team Sovereign ran the car in the FIA Sportscar Championship (then known as the Sports Racing World Cup). The car achieved moderate success, and Team Sovereign retired it at the end of the 2003 season, after the series folded. In 2011, it reappeared in the Britcar series, being driven by Mike Millard.

== Racing history ==
=== 2000–2001 ===
In 1999, LM3000 built a car for the SRL category of the Sports Racing World Cup (SRWC), the Rapier 6, and this was run by Sovereign Racing. Although it was entered in the 2 Hours 30 Minutes of Spa, an event held in May 2000, it would not be until August, at the 2 Hours 30 Minutes of Donington Park, that the Rapier 6 made its debut in the hands of Mike Millard and Ian Flux. The pair completed 62 laps before suspension issues forced them to retire. Flux and Millard next drove the car at the penultimate round of the SRWC, which was the 2 Hours 30 Minutes of Magny-Cours, but retired again, this time due to a driveshaft failure after 57 laps.

Sovereign Racing, now renamed Team Sovereign, remained in the series for 2001, which had now been renamed the FIA Sportscar Championship. Millard and Flux ran the Rapier 6 in the first event of the season, which was the 2 Hours 30 Minutes of Catalunya, and took ninth overall, which equated to fifth in the SR2 category. Engine failure prior to the start of the 2 Hours 30 Minutes of Spa prevented them from competing in that race, and this was followed by a retirement from the 2 Hours 30 Minutes of Magny-Cours due to suspension failure after 50 laps. At the 2 Hours 30 Minutes of Donington, Millard and Flux were able to finish tenth overall, and third in class. The pair finished tenth again at the next event, which was the 2 Hours 30 Minutes of Nürburgring; this time, it equated to seventh in class. Team Sovereign finished eighth in the SR2 Team's Championship, whilst Flux and Millard shared 18th in the SR2 Driver's Championship.

=== 2002–2003 ===
Team Sovereign entered their third FIA Sportscar Championship season in 2002, and initially retained Flux and Millard in the Rapier 6. At the first race of the season, which was the 2 Hours 30 Minutes of Catalunya, they took 11th overall, and fifth in the SR2 category. For the next race, which was the 2 Hours 30 Minutes of Estoril, engine problems prevented them from starting the race. Team Sovereign then skipped the 2 Hours 30 Minutes of Brno, before retiring from the 2 Hours 30 Minutes of Magny-Cours due to an electrical issue after one hour, ten minutes and 34 laps. At the 2 Hours 30 Minutes of Dijon, Phillip Armour replaced Flux, and helped Millard to take seventh overall, and fourth in class. In the final race of the season, which was the 2 Hours 30 Minutes of Spa, gearbox failure after 11 laps and half an hour forced Armour and Millard to retire. Team Sovereign moved up to joint-seventh in the SR2 Team's Championship, finishing level with Debora Automotive, whilst Millard took 16th in the SR2 Driver's Championship.

Team Sovereign did not enter a Rapier 6 in the FIA Sportscar Championship again until the fifth round of the 2003 season, which was the 2 Hours 30 Minutes of Donington Park; Flux returned to the team, and he helped Millard to take fifth overall, and third in the SR2 category. An attempted entry at the 1000 km of Spa amounted to nothing, and Team Sovereign would enter the Rapier 6 in one more race; the 2 Hours 30 Minutes of Nogaro. Millard and Flux took third overall, and won the SR2 category. Team Sovereign were classified sixth in the SR2 Team's Championship, whilst Millard and Flux took joint-13th in the SR2 Driver's Championship.

=== 2011–2012 ===
After eight years without racing, the Rapier 6 was brought out of retirement in 2011, for use in the Britcar Endurance Championship. Millard ran the car alongside Ian Heward, and their team ran under the Flat-Six.co.uk banner. Millard and Heward finished the first race of the season, held at Silverstone, but only completed 46 laps, and were not classified. The pair retired from the next round, held at Rockingham, after one-and-three-quarter hours, and having completed 68 laps. It was a similar story at Donington Park, where Millard and Heward completed 51 laps in one hour 20 minutes before retiring. At Spa-Francorchamps, Millard and Heward won the race by two minutes from the Marcos Mantis of Topcats Racing, thus giving the Rapier 6 its first ever overall win. The final race of the season, held at Castle Combe, was less successful; the team retired after one-and-three-quarter hours, but the 83 laps they had completed secured them 19th overall, and fourth in Class 1. Heward and Millard finished the season in tenth place overall, and third in Class 1, with 92 points.

Millard and Heward ran the Rapier 6 again in 2012. At the first round of the season, held at Silverstone, the pair finished eleventh overall, and fourth in Class 1. At Donington Park, Millard and Heward completed 80 laps, before retiring after one hour and 50 minutes. At Snetterton, they finished second overall and in class. Their final entry of the season came at Brands Hatch, where they retired after one-and-three-quarter hours, but their 117 laps were enough to classify them 16th, and last, overall. At the end of the season, the pair were classified in 15th overall, and fourth in class.

=== 2013 ===
In 2013, Heward left the team, and the opening round of the season, held at Donington Park, saw Millard share the Rapier 6 with Nigel Greensall and Karsten Le Blanc. Although they started the race on pole, they finished tenth, and last, overall (third in class). The trio raced together again at the next round, held at Silverstone, and this time took seventh overall, and another third in Class 1. At Rockingham, Adam Sharpe partnered Millard, but the pair's 91 laps were not enough for them to be classified. Greensall returned to partner Millard for Brands Hatch, whilst Jonathan Coleman rounded out the driving lineup; however, they retired after half an hour, having completed 17 laps. Millard entered himself and Greensall in the next race, which was the 1000 Kilometres of Silverstone, but did not compete. Millard ran the next round, held at Donington Park, on his own, but retired after one-and-a-quarter hours, having completed 51 laps. Millard's team finished the season classified in sixth place, and third in class.
