= 2003 FIA Sportscar Championship Monza =

Layout of the Autodromo Nazionale Monza

The 2003 FIA Sportscar Championship Monza was the third race for the 2003 FIA Sportscar Championship season held at Autodromo Nazionale Monza and ran for 500 kilometers. It took place on June 29, 2003.

== Official results ==
Class winners in bold. Cars failing to complete 75% of winner's distance marked as Not Classified (NC).

Pos	Class	No	Team	Drivers	Chassis	Tyre	Laps
Pos	Class	No	Team	Drivers	Engine	Tyre	Laps
1	**SR1**	**1**	**(Netherlands) Racing for Holland**	**(Netherlands) Jan Lammers (Netherlands) John Bosch**	**Dome S101**	D	**84**
1	**SR1**	**1**	**(Netherlands) Racing for Holland**	**(Netherlands) Jan Lammers (Netherlands) John Bosch**	**Judd GV4 4.0L V10**	D	**84**
2	SR1	21	(United Kingdom) Team Ascari	(South Africa) Werner Lupberger (Netherlands) Klaas Zwart (United Kingdom) Charles Hall	Ascari KZR-1	D	84
2	SR1	21	(United Kingdom) Team Ascari	(South Africa) Werner Lupberger (Netherlands) Klaas Zwart (United Kingdom) Charles Hall	Judd GV4 4.0L V10	D	84
3	SR1	6	(United Kingdom) Taurus Sports Racing	(United Kingdom) Phil Andrews (United Kingdom) Christian Vann	Lola B2K/10	D	84
3	SR1	6	(United Kingdom) Taurus Sports Racing	(United Kingdom) Phil Andrews (United Kingdom) Christian Vann	Judd GV4 4.0L V10	D	84
4	SR1	22	(Italy) R&M	(Italy) Mauro Baldi (Italy) Filippo Francioni (Italy) Ezio Mazza	R&M SP01	G	81
4	SR1	22	(Italy) R&M	(Italy) Mauro Baldi (Italy) Filippo Francioni (Italy) Ezio Mazza	Judd GV4 4.0L V10	G	81
5	SR1	11	(United Kingdom) Earl Goddard	(South Africa) Earl Goddard (United Kingdom) Steve Arnold	Reynard 01Q	D	80
5	SR1	11	(United Kingdom) Earl Goddard	(South Africa) Earl Goddard (United Kingdom) Steve Arnold	Ford Cosworth 3.4L V8	D	80
6	**SR2**	**61**	**(United Kingdom) Team Jota**	**(United Kingdom) John Stack (United Kingdom) Sam Hignett**	**Pilbeam MP84**	A	**78**
6	**SR2**	**61**	**(United Kingdom) Team Jota**	**(United Kingdom) John Stack (United Kingdom) Sam Hignett**	**Nissan (AER) VQL 3.0L V6**	A	**78**
7	SR2	54	(Italy) Ranieri Randaccio	(Italy) Ranieri Randaccio (Italy) Jacepo Sebastiani	Lucchini SR2000	A	54
7	SR2	54	(Italy) Ranieri Randaccio	(Italy) Ranieri Randaccio (Italy) Jacepo Sebastiani	Alfa Romeo 3.0L V6	A	54
DNF	SR1	16	(France) Pescarolo Sport	(France) Jean-Christophe Boullion (France) Franck Lagorce	Courage C60	G	49
DNF	SR1	16	(France) Pescarolo Sport	(France) Jean-Christophe Boullion (France) Franck Lagorce	Peugeot A32 3.2L Turbo V6	G	49
DNF	SR2	52	(Italy) Lucchini Engineering	(Italy) Mirko Savoldi (Italy) Piergiuseppe Peroni	Lucchini SR2002	A	47
DNF	SR2	52	(Italy) Lucchini Engineering	(Italy) Mirko Savoldi (Italy) Piergiuseppe Peroni	Nissan (AER) VQL 3.0L V6	A	47
DNF	SR1	2	(Netherlands) Racing for Holland	(Italy) Beppe Gabbiani (Bolivia) Felipe Ortiz	Dome S101	D	37
DNF	SR1	2	(Netherlands) Racing for Holland	(Italy) Beppe Gabbiani (Bolivia) Felipe Ortiz	Judd GV4 4.0L V10	D	37
DNF	SR1	3	(Monaco) GLV Brums	(France) Xavier Pompidou (Italy) Giovanni Lavaggi	Ferrari 333 SP	G	32
DNF	SR1	3	(Monaco) GLV Brums	(France) Xavier Pompidou (Italy) Giovanni Lavaggi	Judd GV4 4.0L V10	G	32
DNF	SR1	8	(Italy) Automotive Durango SRL	(Italy) Leonardo Maddalena (Italy) Michele Rugolo (Italy) Fulvio Cavicchi	Durango LMP1	D	27
DNF	SR1	8	(Italy) Automotive Durango SRL	(Italy) Leonardo Maddalena (Italy) Michele Rugolo (Italy) Fulvio Cavicchi	Judd GV4 4.0L V10	D	27
DNF	SR2	55	(Italy) GP Racing	(Italy) Fabio Mancini (Italy) Gianni Collini (Italy) Massimo Saccomanno	Lucchini SR2001	A	22
DNF	SR2	55	(Italy) GP Racing	(Italy) Fabio Mancini (Italy) Gianni Collini (Italy) Massimo Saccomanno	Alfa Romeo 3.0L V6	A	22
DNF	SR1	12	(Italy) Gianfranco Trombetti	(Italy) Alex Caffi (Italy) Gianfranco Trombetti	Promec PJ119	G	20
DNF	SR1	12	(Italy) Gianfranco Trombetti	(Italy) Alex Caffi (Italy) Gianfranco Trombetti	Peugeot A32 3.2L Turbo V6	G	20
DNF	SR2	99	(France) PiR Bruneau	(France) Pierre Bruneau (France) Marc Rostan	Pilbeam MP84	A	13
DNF	SR2	99	(France) PiR Bruneau	(France) Pierre Bruneau (France) Marc Rostan	Nissan (AER) VQL 3.0L V6	A	13

== Statistics ==
- Pole Position - #1 Racing for Holland - 1:41.581
- Fastest Lap - #1 Racing for Holland - 1:42.869
- Distance - 486.612 km
- Average Speed - 193.979 km/h

FIA Sportscar Championship
Previous race: 2003 FIA Sportscar Championship Lausitz	2003 season	Next race: 2003 FIA Sportscar Championship Oschersleben
