= 2003 FIA Sportscar Championship Estoril =

First race for the 2003 FIA Sportscar Championship season

Layout of the Autódromo do Estoril

The 2003 FIA Sportscar Championship Estoril was the first race for the 2003 FIA Sportscar Championship season held at Autódromo do Estoril and ran a distance of two hours, thirty minutes. It took place on April 13, 2003.

== Official results ==
Class winners in bold. Cars failing to complete 75% of winner's distance marked as Not Classified (NC).

Pos	Class	No	Team	Drivers	Chassis	Tyre	Laps
Pos	Class	No	Team	Drivers	Engine	Tyre	Laps
1	**SR1**	**16**	**(France) Pescarolo Sport**	**(France) Jean-Christophe Boullion (France) Stéphane Sarrazin**	**Courage C60**	G	**68**
1	**SR1**	**16**	**(France) Pescarolo Sport**	**(France) Jean-Christophe Boullion (France) Stéphane Sarrazin**	**Peugeot A32 3.2L Turbo V6**	G	**68**
2	SR1	5	(United Kingdom) RN Motorsport	(Denmark) John Nielsen (Japan) Hayanari Shimoda	DBA4 03S	D	68
2	SR1	5	(United Kingdom) RN Motorsport	(Denmark) John Nielsen (Japan) Hayanari Shimoda	Zytek ZG348 3.4L V8	D	68
3	SR1	1	(Netherlands) Racing for Holland	(Netherlands) Jan Lammers (Netherlands) John Bosch	Dome S101	G	67
3	SR1	1	(Netherlands) Racing for Holland	(Netherlands) Jan Lammers (Netherlands) John Bosch	Judd GV4 4.0L V10	G	67
4	SR1	8	(Italy) Automotive Durango SRL	(Italy) Michele Rugolo (Italy) Leonardo Maddalena	Durango LMP1	D	65
4	SR1	8	(Italy) Automotive Durango SRL	(Italy) Michele Rugolo (Italy) Leonardo Maddalena	Judd GV4 4.0L V10	D	65
5	**SR2**	**52**	**(Italy) Lucchini Engineering**	**(Italy) Mirko Savoldi (Italy) Piergiuseppe Peroni**	**Lucchini SR2002**	A	**64**
5	**SR2**	**52**	**(Italy) Lucchini Engineering**	**(Italy) Mirko Savoldi (Italy) Piergiuseppe Peroni**	**Nissan (AER) VQL 3.0L V6**	A	**64**
6	SR1	2	(Netherlands) Racing for Holland	(Italy) Beppe Gabbiani (Bolivia) Felipe Ortiz	Dome S101	G	63
6	SR1	2	(Netherlands) Racing for Holland	(Italy) Beppe Gabbiani (Bolivia) Felipe Ortiz	Judd GV4 4.0L V10	G	63
7	SR2	55	(Italy) GP Racing	(Italy) Fabio Mancini (Italy) Gianni Collini (Italy) Massimo Saccomanno	Lucchini SR2001	A	63
7	SR2	55	(Italy) GP Racing	(Italy) Fabio Mancini (Italy) Gianni Collini (Italy) Massimo Saccomanno	Alfa Romeo 3.0L V6	A	63
8	SR2	54	(Italy) SCI	(United Kingdom) Paul Daniels (Italy) Ranieri Randaccio	Lucchini SR2000	A	61
8	SR2	54	(Italy) SCI	(United Kingdom) Paul Daniels (Italy) Ranieri Randaccio	Alfa Romeo 3.0L V6	A	61
9	SR1	12	(Italy) Gianfranco Trombetti	(Italy) Alex Caffi (Italy) Gianfranco Trombetti	Promec PJ119	G	46
9	SR1	12	(Italy) Gianfranco Trombetti	(Italy) Alex Caffi (Italy) Gianfranco Trombetti	Peugeot A32 3.2L Turbo V6	G	46
10	SR2	61	(United Kingdom) Team Jota	(United Kingdom) Sam Hignett (United Kingdom) John Stack	Pilbeam MP84	A	46
10	SR2	61	(United Kingdom) Team Jota	(United Kingdom) Sam Hignett (United Kingdom) John Stack	Nissan (AER) VQL 3.0L V6	A	46
NC	SR2	99	(France) PiR Bruneau	(France) Pierre Bruneau (France) Marc Rostan	Pilbeam MP84	A	27
NC	SR2	99	(France) PiR Bruneau	(France) Pierre Bruneau (France) Marc Rostan	Nissan 3.0L V6	A	27
DNF	SR1	6	(United Kingdom) Taurus Sports Racing	(United Kingdom) Justin Keen (United Kingdom) Christian Vann	Lola B2K/10	D	0
DNF	SR1	6	(United Kingdom) Taurus Sports Racing	(United Kingdom) Justin Keen (United Kingdom) Christian Vann	Judd GV4 4.0L V10	D	0

== Statistics ==
- Pole Position - #16 Pescarolo Sport - 1:48.721
- Distance - 284.376 km
- Average Speed - 113.504 km/h

FIA Sportscar Championship
Previous race: None	2003 season	Next race: 2003 FIA Sportscar Championship Lausitz
