= Reynard 02S =

Le Mans Prototype race car

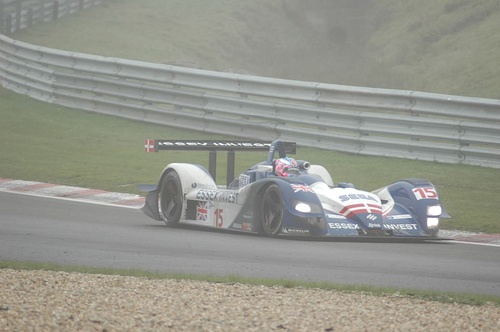
A Zytek 04S, a later evolution of the Reynard 02S

The Reynard 02S was a Le Mans Prototype race car built by Reynard Motorsport in 2002. Intended to replace the failed Reynard 2KQ prototype, the 02S would end up becoming the final new design from Reynard as the company went bankrupt prior to the project's completion.

International Racing Management bought the rights to the 02S project and would complete the car under the name DBA4 03S. In 2004, Zytek would be tasked with building more chassis, which would be sold under the name Zytek 04S before being upgraded to the Zytek 06S. A further alternative was created by Creation Autosportif in 2006, named the Creation CA06/H. Some of the chassis continue to be used, although they have been extensively modified from the original Reynard designs.

== Development ==
In 2000 Reynard had introduced the 2KQ prototype to customers with mixed success. The car was plagued with aerodynamic problems that led to many customers quickly moving on to better chassis. Even after an attempt to modify the 2KQ with an upgrade package in 2001 called the 01Q, Reynard decided that an all new car was necessary. At the same time, the Automobile Club de l'Ouest (ACO), organizers of the 24 Hours of Le Mans, had reorganized the Le Mans Prototype classifications with the creation of the LMP900 and LMP675 classes.

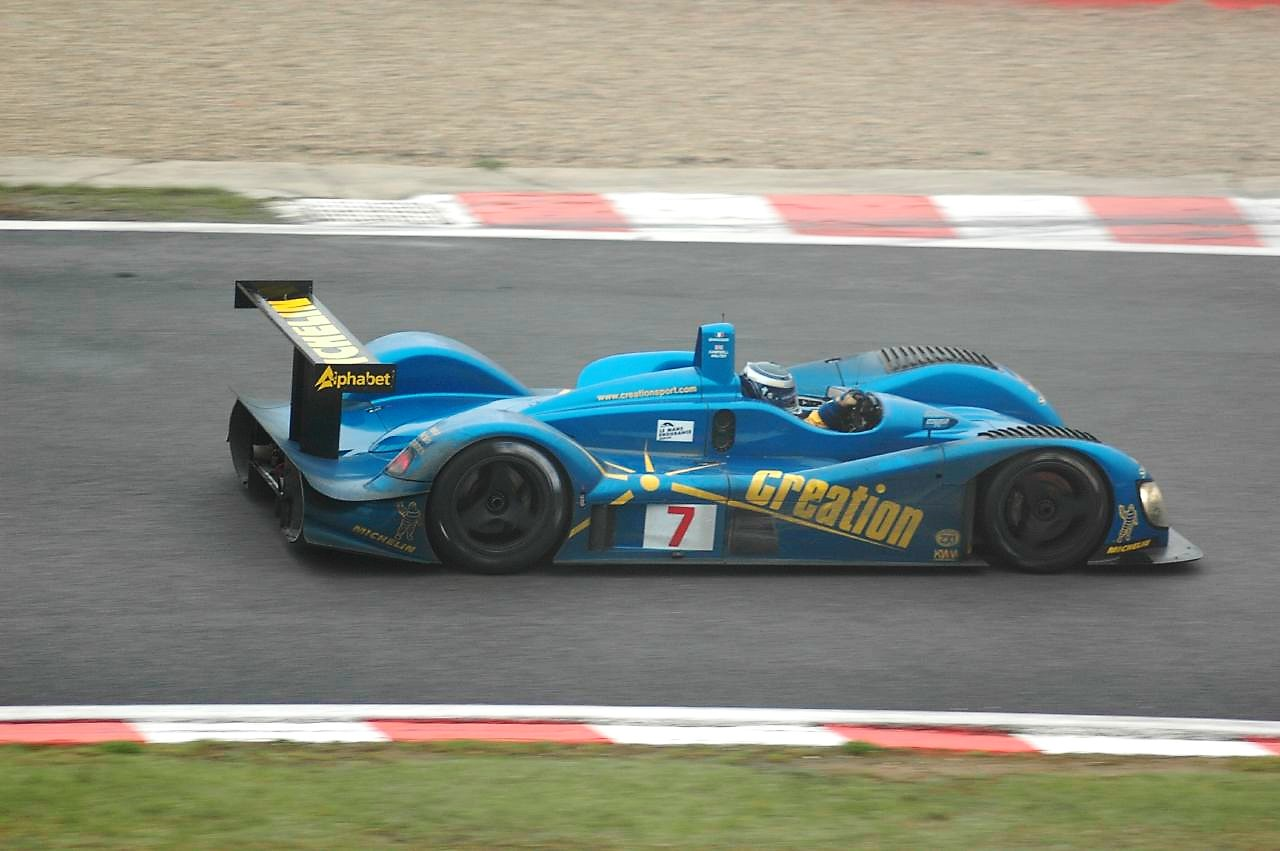
The initial DBA4 03S as later raced by Creation Autosportif.

Due to similarities in the design characteristics of LMP900 and LMP675 chassis, Reynard set about designing a chassis that could run in either class, dependent upon ballast and the type of engine installed. However the car was originally built around the use of a Zytek ZG348 V8, built to the LMP675 maximum size of 3400 cc. A new sequential gearbox built by Ricardo would integrate a paddle-shift system on the steering wheel that was designed specifically for the 02S. The bodywork of the 02S, designed by Will Phillips, would be very low in design with a tall rear wing set to the maximum allowable height.

=== IRM and RN Motorsport ===
When Reynard went bankrupt, International Racing Management (IRM) bought the rights to the 02S designs as well as the unfinished chassis. The project was initially offered to the Japanese team YGK with the belief that the car would be renamed as YGK 02S, but they passed on further developing the car. RN Motorsport would eventually become part of the project, and following its debut under the Reynard guise at the 2002 Petit Le Mans, the car would be renamed a DBA4 03S (later shortened to simply DBA 03S). Carsten Rae, co-owner of RN Motorsport, chose the DBA name in honor of the newspaper he owned, Den Blå Avis. Very little was changed by IRM between the initial Reynard development work and the finished product that appeared in late 2002.

=== Zytek Engineering ===
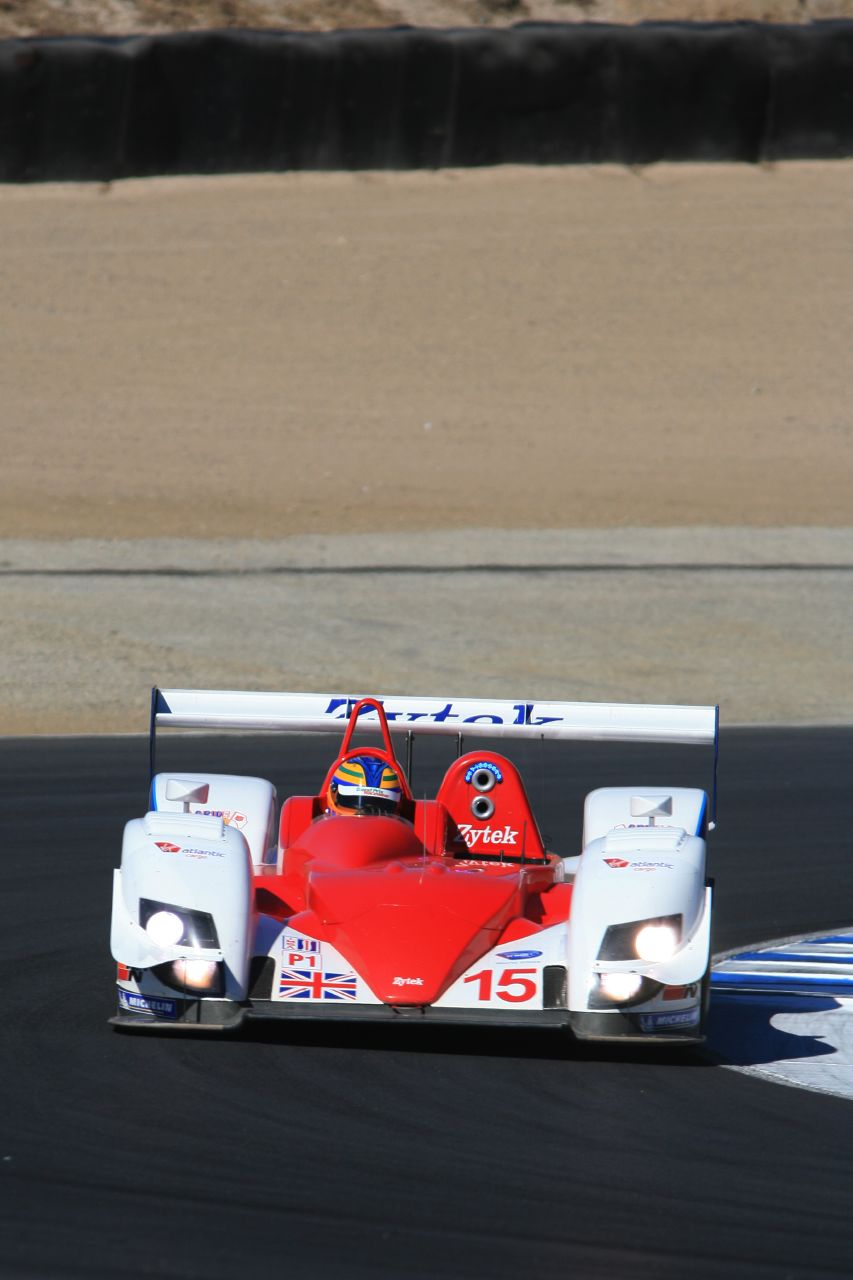
Zytek's 06S in competition in North America

Following the 2003 season, the success of the lone RN Motorsport DBA4 03S had brought customers to IRM, hoping for more chassis. In order to help engineer new cars, IRM formed a partnership with Zytek Engineering, in which Zytek would build the cars while IRM retained the intellectual rights. Since the new chassis were built entirely by Zytek, the new cars became known as the Zytek 04S. The chassis would be slightly modified as the elimination of the LMP900 and LMP675 classes in 2004 meant that the cars would move to the new LMP1 class, requiring some adaptation.

The general layout of the 04S remained the same throughout 2004 and 2005 before modifications were required. New Le Mans Prototype regulations required older LMP900 and LMP675-based cars to be modified with new bodywork due to the monocoque not fully complying with the new regulations. Zytek adapted their 04S as well as adding a larger 4000 cc 2ZG408 V8 engine for more power, earning the car the name 06S. Zytek also modified an existing 04S with a similar 4000 cc ZB408 V8 for Hitotsuyama Racing in Japan, naming it the Zytek 05S.

After 2006 the hybrid Zytek was no longer legal, requiring Zytek to build a new chassis, termed the Zytek 07S. Although many stylistic elements of the 04S were retained, these cars share nothing mechanically with the original Reynard 02S and are considered entirely new cars.

=== Creation Autosportif ===
Following the 2003 season, RN Motorsport was dissolved and their lone DBA4 03S was bought by Creation Autosportif. Like Zytek, they initially maintained the basic layout of the initial design, but in 2005 Creation would modify their chassis in order to better adapt to the new LMP1 regulations. Replacing the Zytek V8, Creation heavily revised the engine bay of the DBA 03S to hold a larger 5000cc Judd GV5 V10.

Also like Zytek, Creation would be forced to heavily modify their car in 2006 in order to meet the hybrid regulations. With the aid of KW Motorsport, Creation would create their own unique car which differed greatly from Zytek's own 06S. Since Creation had carried out the modifications, they chose to rename the car once again, making it the Creation CA06/H.

With the CA06/H no longer legal in 2007, Creation also created an entirely new chassis that retained elements of the CA06/H's bodywork. This entirely new car would be termed the Creation CA07.

== Racing history ==
=== RN Motorsport ===
Following the completion of the initial Reynard 02S chassis, RN Motorsport chose the 2002 Petit Le Mans as their first competitive outing, in an attempt to prove the capabilities of the chassis. The car managed to qualify tenth overall and third in the LMP675 in the 48 car field, behind a pair of MG-Lola EX257s. RN Motorsport drivers John Nielsen and Casper Elgaard managed to last six hours before cooling problems put the car out of the race. To begin 2003, the team remained in America for the 12 Hours of Sebring, qualifying fifth overall and on the LMP675 pole, but breaking a gearbox after only 73 laps in the race.

Returning to Europe, RN Motorsport would concentrate on the FIA Sportscar Championship, where the renamed DBA4 03S would compete in the premiere SR1 class. With John Nielsen being joined by Hayanari Shimoda and Andy Wallace, the car managed a victory at Oschersleben and second at Estoril. However budgetary concerns forced the team to miss several rounds, leaving them to finish the season third in the championship.

RN Motorsport also brought the DBA4 03S to the 24 Hours of Le Mans, where they took the LMP675 class pole. RN Motorsports would be amongst only three LMP675s that would finish the race, with the team taking second in class, although they were 31 laps behind the winning LMP675 class car and ranked a distant 23rd overall.

=== Creation Autosportif ===
Following the end of RN Motorsport, the lone DBA4 03S chassis would be purchased by Creation Autosportif as the team moved to the new Le Mans Series in 2004. The team employed Jamie Campbell-Walter and Nicolas Minassian, who managed to score third-place finishes that initial season, earning the team fourth in the LMP1 championship behind a trio of Audi R8s. The team also chose to fly to the United States for the final rounds of the American Le Mans Series, qualifying in second at Petit Le Mans before an engine failure put them out of the race. The team then improved by taking pole at Laguna Seca before once again succumbing to mechanical failures.

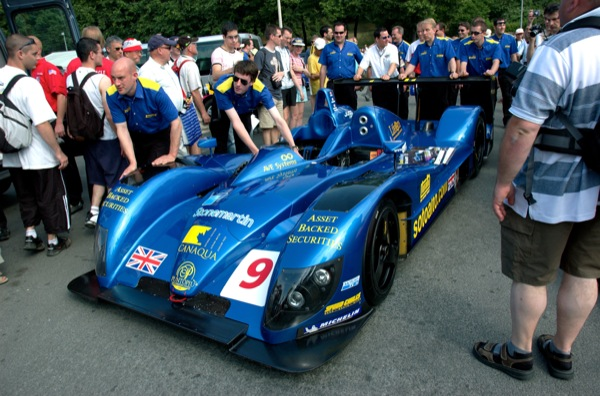
Creation's upgraded CA06/H at the 2006 24 Hours of Le Mans.

For 2005, Creation continued in the Le Mans Series with their modified chassis housing a new Judd V10. Minassian and Campbell-Walter would take a best finish of second at Silverstone en route to a fifth-place finish in the teams championship. The team also made their debut at the 24 Hours of Le Mans, taking a 14th-place finish.

For 2006, Creation concentrated on adapting their DBA 03S to meet new regulations, causing struggle in the early LMS rounds. However, by the third round, the team would once again take a second-place finish. The fourth round of the season at Donington would see the debut of a second CA06/H chassis, with Creation having one of their strongest performances ever. Both cars would finish on the podium. A fourth at the final round for one CA06/H would allow Creation Autosportif to take second in the LMS championship.

For the team's second attempt at Le Mans, they would be unable to repeat their success of the previous year due to problems late in the race. Creation would also once again visit the final American Le Mans Series rounds. After taking pole position at Petit Le Mans the car would finish fourth, followed by a third-place finish at Laguna Seca.

For 2007, Creation would move onto their all new chassis for the Le Mans Series, the Creation CA07, while their Reynard 02-based CA06/Hs would be sold.

=== Zytek Engineering ===
With the completion of the first Zytek-built chassis sold to Team Jota, the factory team would also attempt the new Le Mans Series with their second chassis, although they would not run a full season. In the only two races that Zytek entered, they finished sixth and fourth, earning the team eighth in the championship. Zytek would also attempt Le Mans, but would be unable to finish the race.

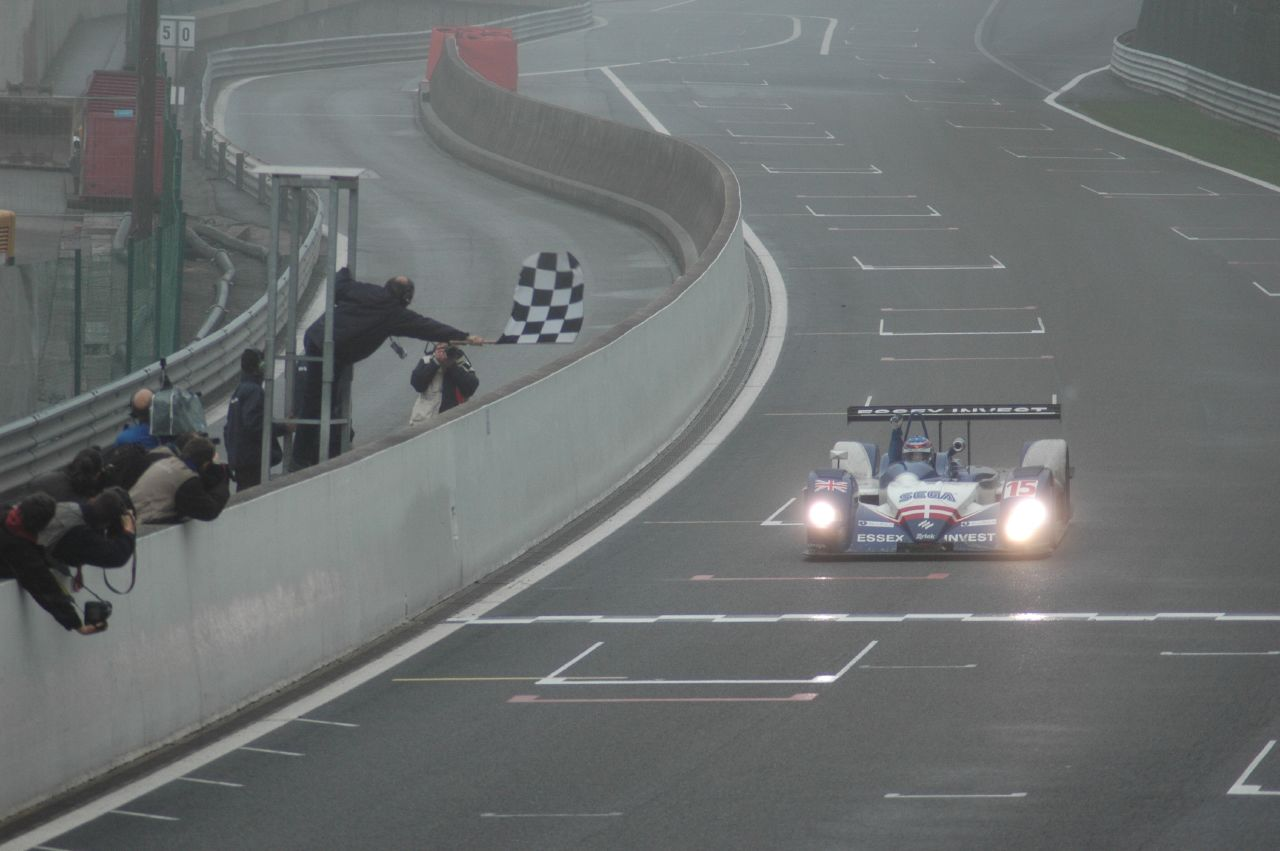
Zytek Engineering's 04S taking victory at the 2005 1000km of Spa.

Zytek's program would be greatly expanded for 2005, as the team chose to run the entire Le Mans Series season. This would pay off for the team as Hayanari Shimoda, Casper Elgaard, and John Nielsen would win the opening round at Spa. Shimoda and newcomer Tom Chilton would repeat this success with another win at the Nürburgring. However even with two wins, Zytek would end up finishing second in the LMP1 championship, a mere two points behind Pescarolo Sport.

Zytek also chose to expand to the American Le Mans Series, running at 2005 American Le Mans at Mid-Ohio early in the year and winning pole position before finishing fourth. The team would return at the end of the season, taking pole at Petit Le Mans before being involved on an accident on the first lap. Zytek would have retribution at Laguna Seca by taking pole position and going on to win the race.

With the team's new 06S chassis, the team once again ran the full LMS season, although they would not be able to repeat their previous success. Due to delays in finishing the 06S chassis, the team would miss the opening round, but would follow with a third and seventh-place finishes. Problems at the fourth round would force the team to choose to skip the final round of the season, leaving them fifth in the championship.

The team returned to Le Mans that season, and although they were able to finish, they were too many laps behind the winner to be counted in the results. Zytek would also return to the American Le Mans Series final rounds, which saw the team take second at Petit Le Mans followed by a seventh at Laguna Seca.

For 2007, team would construct their all new Zytek 07S for continued participation in the Le Mans Series.

=== Team Jota ===
Sam Hignett's Team Jota came out of the collapsed FIA Sportscar Championship looking for a new chassis for use in the Le Mans Series in 2004. Having raced against RN Motorsport's DBA4 03S, Hignett chose to purchase the new customer Zytek 04S. Also choosing to run the Le Mans Series, Jota would have mixed results. A best of a mere fifth was all the team was able to achieve over the full season, although this did earn them a tie for sixth in the championship.

The team would return in 2005 with more success. The team would take second place at Monza before finishing out the season with points finishes in all remaining races, once again earning them sixth in the championship. The team would also make their debut at the 24 Hours of Le Mans with an alliance with Zytek Engineering. The car ran in 12th place towards the finish, but mechanical problems prevented the car from crossing the finishing line and thus leaving the car unclassified.

Following the 2005 season, Team Jota would drop out of the Le Mans Series and sell their 04S to Creation Autosportif for conversion to a second CA06/H.

=== Hitotsuyama Racing ===
When Zytek began construction of their new hybrid 06S following the 2005 season, their former 04S chassis was offered for sale. Japanese squad Hitotsuyama Racing took the opportunity to purchase the chassis for use in the newly launched Japan Le Mans Challenge. The chassis would be upgraded with a 4000 cc Zytek ZB408 V8, leading to the car being renamed a Zytek 05S.

Hitotsuyama would struggle in the JLMC during the 2006 season, failing to finish the first two rounds. However at the third and final round, Hitotsuyama would manage to finish in fourth place overall, although 23 laps behind the winning Courage-Mugen.

Hitotsuyama Racing continued to run their 05S in the JLMC in 2007.

=== Intersport Racing ===
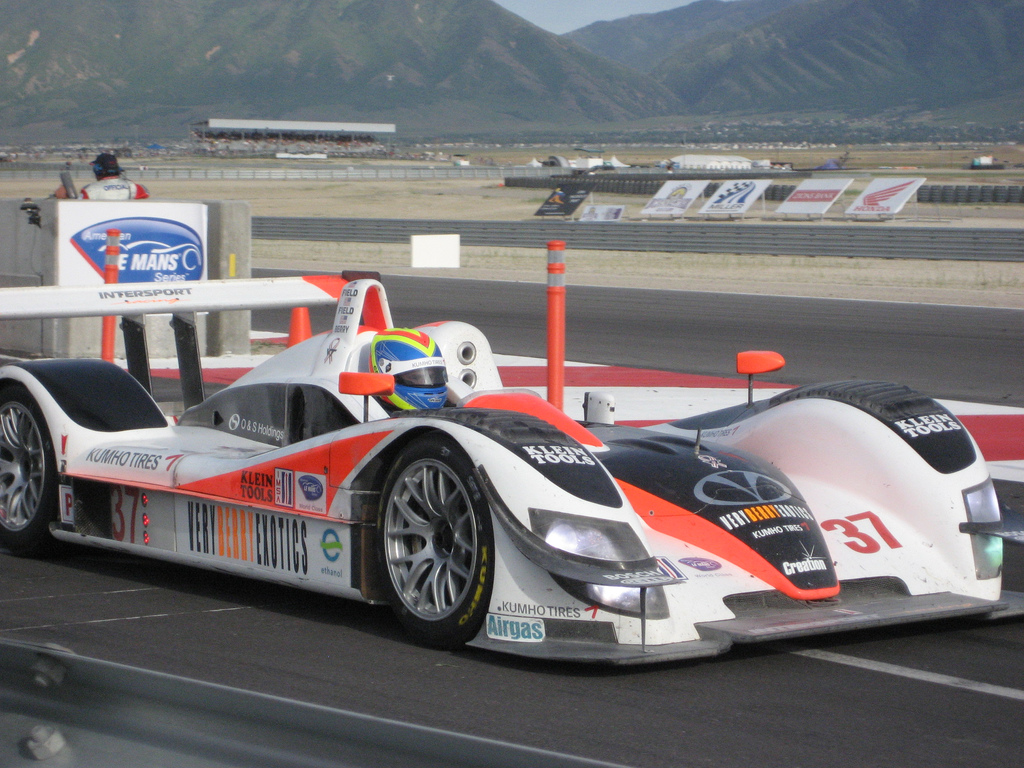
Intersport's CA06/H running on Kumho tires.

When Creation Autosportif built their new CA07 chassis, their two modified CA06/H chassis were offered up for sale. American team Intersport Racing was hoping to move from the LMP2 class to the LMP1 class in the American Le Mans Series. Due to ALMS regulations which allowed older hybrid chassis to continue to compete, Intersport purchased one of the two CA06/Hs. However the team would struggle with their selection of Kumho tires, mostly because Kumho had not previously created LMP1-spec tires before.

Intersport would eventually abandon the Kumho tires for Dunlop, but with no better performance the team would abandon their use of the CA06/H chassis.

=== Autocon Motorsports ===
Like Intersport, Autocon also took the opportunity to purchase a CA06/H for use in the American Le Mans Series. Unlike Intersport, Autocon actually started the season with their MG-Lola EX257 before deciding to switch to the Creation mid-season. Autocon switched to a Lola B06/10 as it returned to the series after a short hiatus in 2009.

== Chassis ==
In total, only three cars using the original Reynard design were completed. The fourth chassis shared many elements from the Reynard design, but was also altered to meet hybrid regulations. The newer Zytek 07S and Creation CA07 no longer share anything mechanical with Reynard chassis and are considered different designs.

Each chassis, the name it raced under, and the teams that ran it are listed below:

Chassis #01

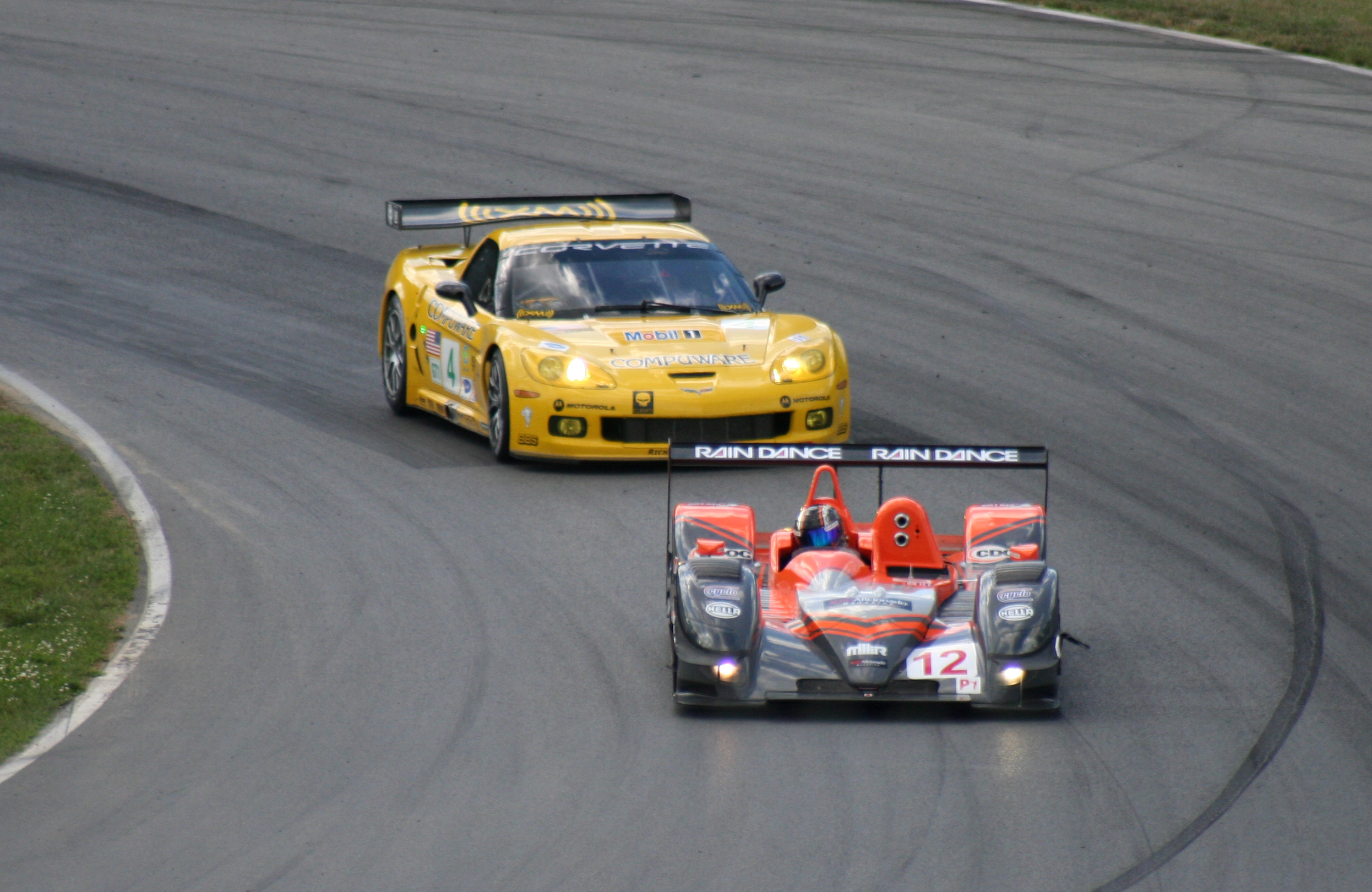
Autocon's CA06/H (chassis #01) leading a Chevrolet Corvette C6.R in the American Le Mans Series.

Reynard 02S

- RN Motorsport (2002)

DBA4 03S/DBA 03S

- RN Motorsport (2003)
- Creation Autosportif (2004–2005)

Creation CA06/H

- Creation Autosportif (2006)
- Autocon Motorsports (2007)

Chassis #02

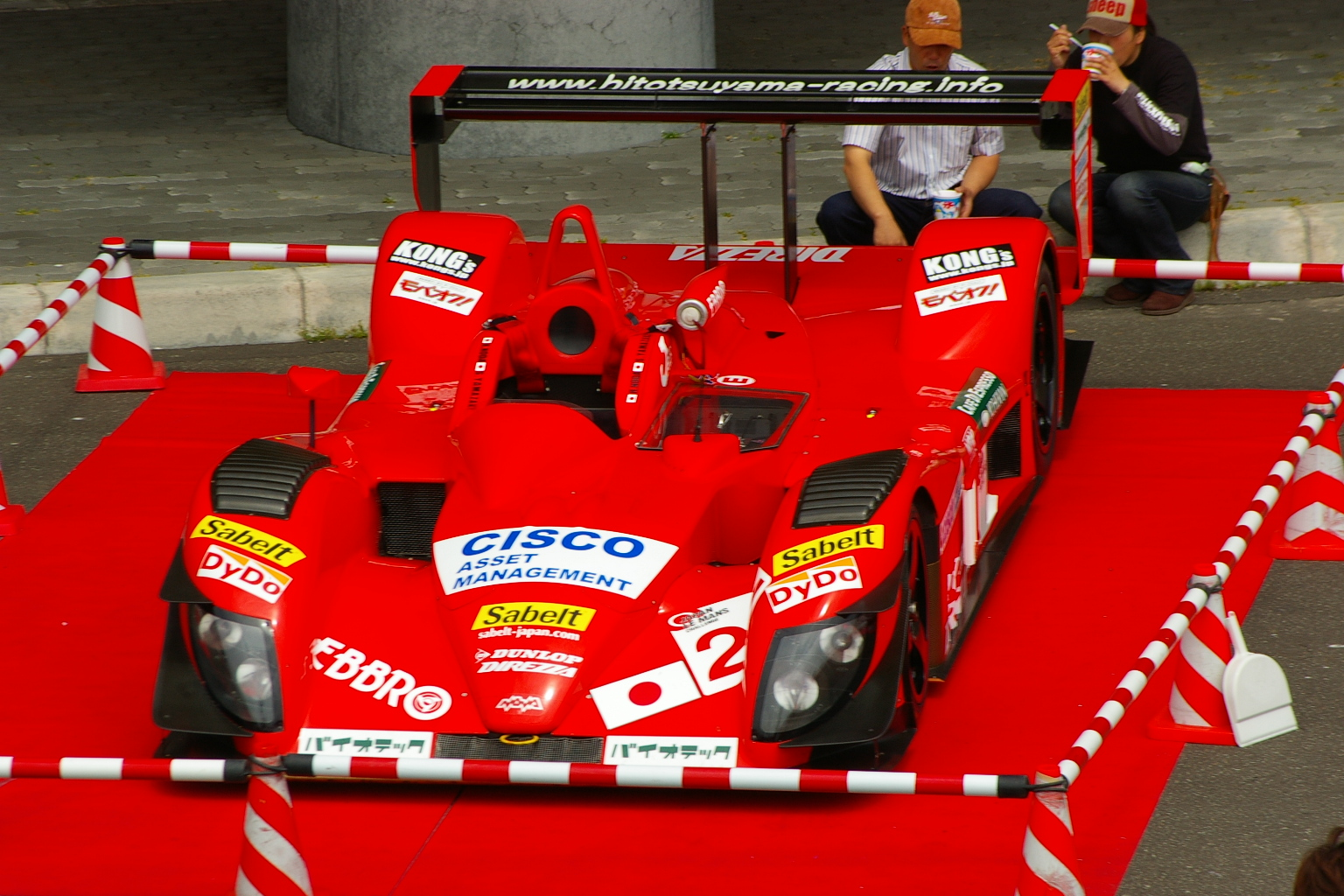
Hitotsuyama's 05S (chassis #03) which competes in the Japan Le Mans Challenge.

Zytek 04S

- Team Jota (2004–2005)

Creation CA06/H

- Creation Autosportif (2006)
- Intersport Racing (2007)

Chassis #03

Zytek 04S

- Zytek Engineering (2004–2005)

Zytek 05S

- Hitotsuyama Racing (2006–2007)

Chassis #04

Reynard 02S

- Reynard Engineering (2002)

Zytek 04S

- Zytek Engineering (2004)

Zytek 06S

- Zytek Engineering (2006)
