= Dome S101 =

Japanese sports car prototype

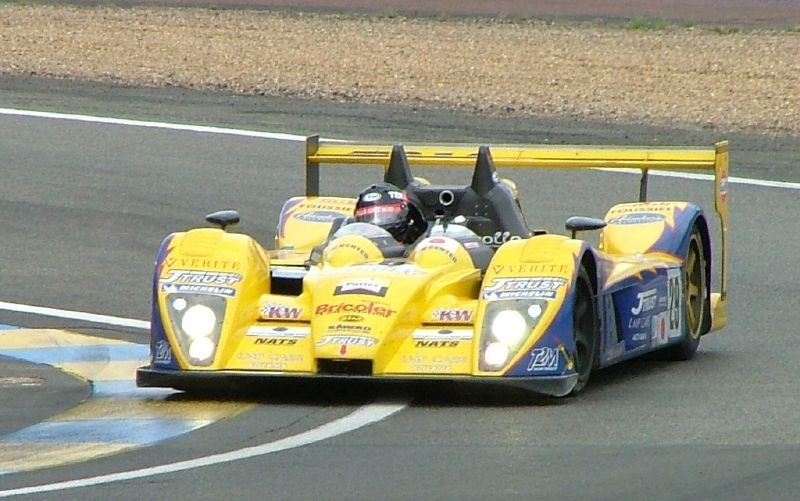
- Dome S101 at the 2007 24 Hours of Le Mans
- Category: Dome S101: Le Mans Prototype (LMP900) Dome S101Hb/Hbi/101.5: Le Mans Prototype (LMP1)
- Constructor: Dome Co. LTD
- Designer: Akiyoshi Oku
- Predecessor: Dome S101
- Successor: Dome S102

Technical specifications
- Chassis: Carbon fibre monocoque
- Suspension (front): Double Wishbone twin-damper pullrod
- Suspension (rear): As Front
- Length: Dome S101: 4650mm Dome S101Hb/HBi/101.5: 4485mm
- Width: 1995mm
- Height: Dome S102: 920mm Dome S102.5: 1025mm
- Wheelbase: 2850mm
- Engine: Dome S101:Judd GV4 4.0L NA V10; Dome S101Hb:Mugen MF408S 4.0L V8; Dome S101HBi:Judd GV5 5.0L V10; Dome S101.5: Judd GV5.5 S2 5.5L V10; Mader 3.4L V8
- Transmission: Dome S101: SQ 6 Speed Dome S101Hb/Hbi/101.5: X-Trac 6 Speed
- Weight: Dome S101: 720kg Dome S101Hb/Hbi/101.5: 900kg
- Brakes: Alcon Calipers/Carbone Industrie Pads & Rotor
- Tyres: Michelin, Yokohama, Dunlop

Competition history
- Notable entrants: (Netherlands) Racing for Holland (Japan) Kondo Racing (Denmark) Team Den Blå Avis-Goh (Japan) Jim Gainer International (Japan) T2M Motorsport
Races	Wins	Podiums
24	9	19
- Teams' Championships: 2 (2002 FIA Sportscar Championship & 2003 FIA Sportscar Championship)
- Drivers' Championships: 2 (2002 FIA Sportscar Championship & 2003 FIA Sportscar Championship)

The Dome S101, later upgraded and raced as the Dome S101 Hb, S101 Hbi, and the Dome S101.5, is a sports prototype built and designed for use in the LMP1 class of the 24 Hours Of Le Mans, and other similar endurance races. The car was the predecessor to the Dome S102, and the Strakka-Dome S103. The car had its racing debut at the 2001 Barcelona 2 Hours and 30 minutes, the opening round of the 2001 FIA Sportscar Championship, with the Den Blå Avis racing team.

== Development ==
=== Dome S101hb ===
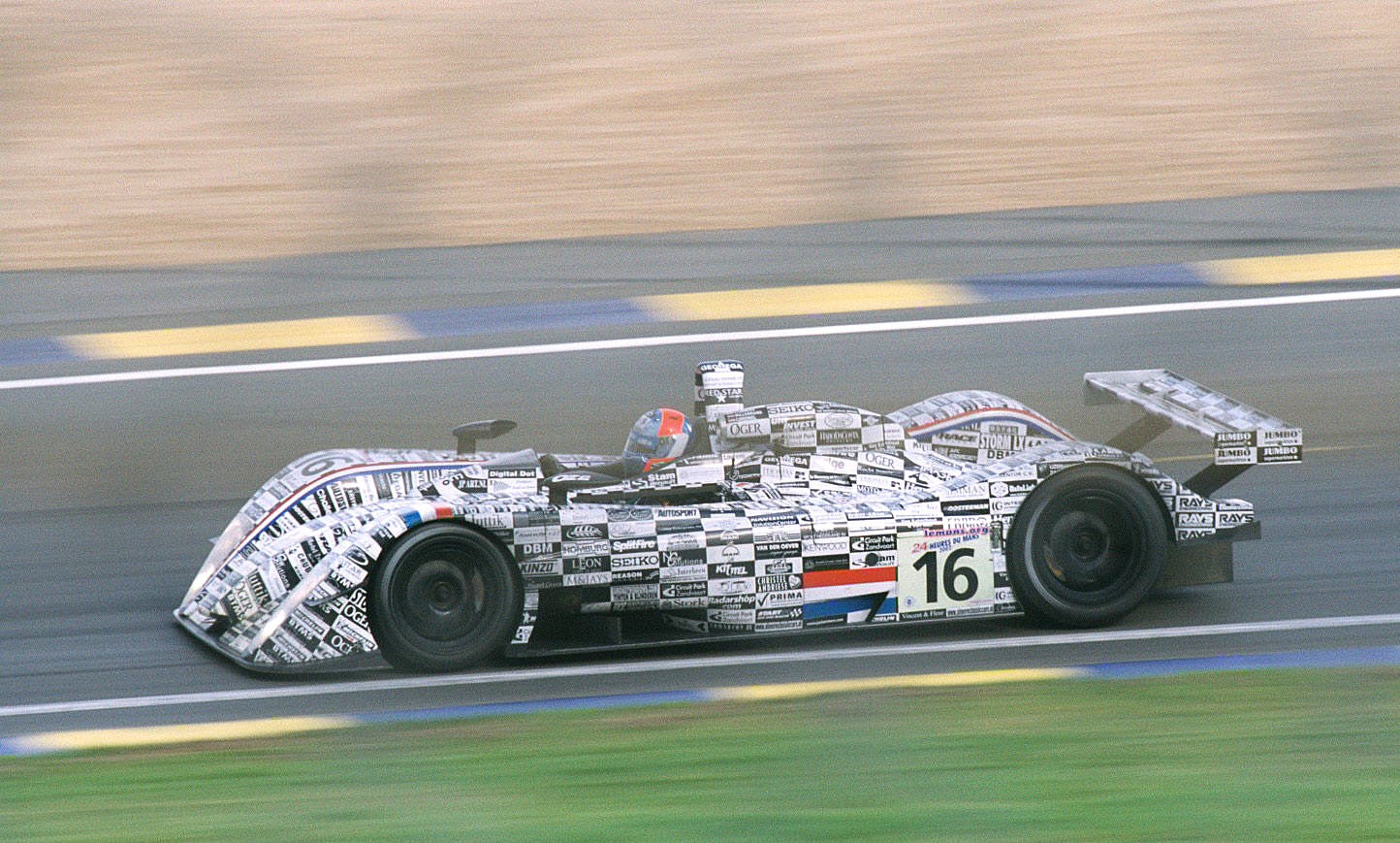
Dome S101 at the 2002 24 Hours of Le Mans

In March 2005, the car was shown to be early in its testing cycle, with the car having been shown testing, in photos released by Dome Co, ahead of the Le Mans Series Prologue at the Circuit Paul Ricard.

=== Dome S101.5 ===
Due to new regulations in LMP1 for the upcoming 2007 racing season, which meant that "Hybrid" rules LMP1 cars were to be barred from competing in any ACO Sanctioned event, Dome was forced to create a new variant of the car. In a bid to save costs, the lower half of the S101hb monocoque was retained, while a new double roll hoop assembly was attached, in place of the previously used single roll hoop, and air intake.

== Competition History ==
=== 2001 ===
The car had its racing debut at the 2001 Barcelona 2 Hours and 30 minutes, the opening round of the 2001 FIA Sportscar Championship, with the Den Blå Avis racing team. The car was joined by a second car in the championship, entered by Racing for Holland. The car had its inaugural win at the Mistrovství FIA Sportnovních Vozu, held at the Brno Circuit, in the Czech Republic.

==== FIA Sportscar Championship- SR1 Teams Championship ====
Team	Car	Engine	(Spain) CAT	(Italy) MNZ	(Belgium) SPA	(Czech Republic) BRN	(France) MAG	(United Kingdom) DON	(Republic of Ireland) MON	(Germany) NUR	Total	Pos
(Denmark) Den Blå Avis	Dome S101	Judd GV4 4.0L V10	4	DNS	6	1	3	5	1	3	88	2nd
(Netherlands) Racing for Holland	Dome S101	Judd GV4 4.0L V10	DNS	3	3	5	6	2	2	1	82	3rd

=== 2002 ===
Racing for Holland re-entered their Dome chassis into the 2002 FIA Sportscar Championship, securing 1st in the Teams Championship. Dome won the 2002 FIA Sportscar Constructors Championship.

Team	Car	Engine	(Spain) CAT	(Portugal) EST	(Czech Republic) BRN	(France) MAG	(France) DJN	(Belgium) SPA	Total	Pos
(Netherlands) Racing for Holland	Dome S101	Judd GV4 4.0L V10	4	3	1	1	1	2	97	1st

=== 2003 ===
Racing for Holland would re-enter their Dome chassis into the 2003 FIA Sportscar Championship, winning the title for a 2nd Consecutive Year.

Team	Car	Engine	(Portugal) EST	(Germany) LAU	(Italy) MNZ	(Germany) OSC	(United Kingdom) DON	(Belgium) SPA	(France) NOG	Total	Pos
(Netherlands) Racing for Holland	Dome S101	Judd GV4 4.0L V10	3	1	1	2	1	Ret		44	1st

=== 24 Hours of Le Mans ===
Year	Entrant	Car	#	Drivers	Tyre	Class	Laps	Pos	Class Position
2001	(Netherlands) Racing for Holland	Dome S101-Judd	9	(Netherlands) Jan Lammers (Netherlands) Donny Crevels (Netherlands) Val Hillebrand	M	LMP900	213	28	12
2001	(Denmark) Team Den Blå Avis-Goh	Dome S101-Judd	10	(Denmark) John Nielsen (Japan) Hiroki Katoh (Denmark) Casper Elgaard	G	LMP900	66	NC	NC
2002	(Netherlands) Racing for Holland	Dome S101-Judd	16	(Netherlands) Jan Lammers (Netherlands) Tom Coronel (Netherlands) Val Hillebrand	M	LMP900	351	8	
2002	(Japan) Kondo Racing	Dome S101-Judd	9	(Japan) Masahiko Kondo (United Kingdom) Ian McKellar Jr. (France) François Migault	M	LMP900	182	DNF	DNF
2003	(Netherlands) Racing for Holland	Dome S101-Judd	15	(Netherlands) Jan Lammers (Netherlands) John Bosch (United Kingdom) Andy Wallace	M	LMP900	360	6	4
2003	(Netherlands) Racing for Holland	Dome S101-Judd	16	(Bolivia) Felipe Ortiz (Italy) Beppe Gabbiani (France) Tristan Gommendy	M	LMP900	316	DNF	DNF
2003	(Japan) Kondo Racing	Dome S101-Mugen	9	(Japan) Masahiko Kondō (Japan) Ukyo Katayama (Japan) Ryō Fukuda	Y	LMP900	322	13	
2004	(Netherlands) Racing for Holland	Dome S101-Judd	15	(Netherlands) Jan Lammers (United States) Chris Dyson (Japan) Katsutomo Kaneishi	D	LMP1	341	7	
2004	(Netherlands) Racing for Holland	Dome S101-Judd	16	(Netherlands) Tom Coronel (United Kingdom) Justin Wilson (United Kingdom) Ralph Firman	D	LMP1	313	DNF	DNF
2004	(Japan) Kondo Racing	Dome S101-Mugen	9	(Japan) Hiroki Katoh (Japan) Ryō Fukuda (Japan) Ryo Michigami	Y	LMP1	206	DNF	DNF
2005	(Netherlands) Racing for Holland	Dome S101-Judd	10	(Netherlands) Jan Lammers (United States) Elton Julian (Netherlands) John Bosch	D	LMP1	346	7	
2005	(Japan) Jim Gainer International	Dome S101Hb-Mugen	5	(Japan) Ryo Michigami (Japan) Seiji Ara (Japan) Katsutomo Kaneishi	D	LMP1	193	DNF	DNF
2006	(Netherlands) Racing for Holland	Dome S101Hb- Judd	14	(Netherlands) Jan Lammers (Malaysia) Alex Yoong (Sweden) Stefan Johansson	D	LMP1	182	DNF	DNF
2007	(Netherlands) Racing for Holland b.v.	Dome S101.5-Judd	14	(Netherlands) Jan Lammers (Netherlands) Jeroen Bleekemolen (Netherlands) David Hart	M	LMP1	305	25	DNF
2007	(Japan) T2M Motorsport	Dome S101.5-Mader	29	(France) Robin Longechal (Japan) Yutaka Yamagishi (Japan) Yojiro Terada	M	LMP1	56	DNF	DNF
