= Racing for Holland =

Dutch motor racing team

(Netherlands) Racing for Holland
- Founded: 1999
- Founder(s): Jan Lammers
- Folded: 2009
- Base: Amsterdam, Netherlands
- Team principal(s): Jan Lammers
- Former series: FIA Sportscar Championship; A1 Grand Prix; Le Mans Series; Superleague Formula
- Noted drivers: (Netherlands) Jeroen Bleekemolen (Netherlands) John Bosch (Netherlands) Val Hillebrand (Netherlands) Jan Lammers (Netherlands) Jos Verstappen
- Teams' Championships: 2002 FIA Sportscars; 2003 FIA Sportscars

Racing for Holland is a Dutch motor racing team started by Jan Lammers in 1999. The team is initially specialised in endurance races such as 24 hours of Le Mans and FIA sportscars series. The team also participated in the A1 Grand Prix as the A1 Team The Netherlands. It would eventually continue as Racing Team Nederland under ownership of Frits van Eerd and Jumbo.

== History ==
Racing for Holland wascreated in 1999 as Talkline Racing for Holland. The team would participate in that year's 24 Hours of Le Mans in collaboration with Konrad Motorsport. Drivers for the race were Jan Lammers, Tom Coronel and Peter Kox. Talkline would withdraw sponsorship after the 2000 race, in which the team was disqualified after Tom Coronel left the car for more than 30 meter to collect his lost rear tire, starting a struggle to find funding. In 2001, Racing for Holland for the first time took part in the 24 Hours of Le Mans without help from Konrad Motorsport, resulting again in a retirement. However, Racing for Holland were showing a fast pace ever since their debut on Le Mans and they finished for the first time in 2002, in 8th place, and a year later a best ever finish in 6th place.

== Sportscar Racing ==
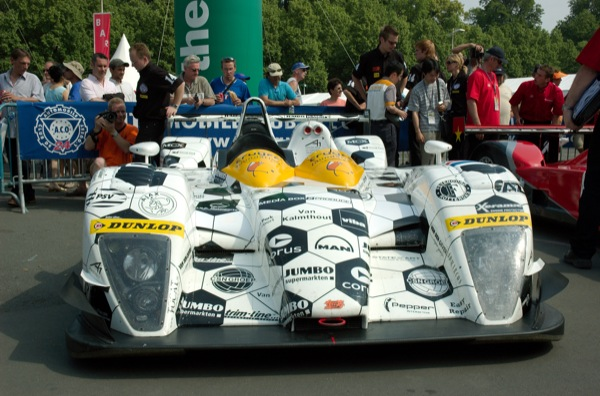
Racing for Holland's Dome S101-Judd at the 2006 24 Hours of Le Mans, showing a special paint scheme for the 2006 FIFA World Cup.

Racing for Holland had for many years campaigned a Dome S101 prototype powered by a Judd engine in the FIA Sportscar Championship, Le Mans Series, and the most of all the 24 Hours of Le Mans, including a best of sixth place overall in 2003.

With the Dome-Judd combination, Racing for Holland was successful in winning the FIA Sportscar Championship in 2002 and 2003 after having finished third in 2001. In the Le Mans Series, Racing for Holland has not had as much success, finishing ninth in the LMP1 standings in both 2005 and 2006.

== Sponsors ==
Unable to find one major sponsor for the team after Talkline's withdraw from sponsorship, Jan Lammers started an unusual sponsor programme. Instead of a few major sponsors, he set out to find many minor sponsors. The team sold small square spaces on the car, either in white lettering on a black background or vice versa. This gives the car a chequered appearance with the only other notable colours being red, blue (colours of the Dutch flag) and orange (the colour of the Dutch royal house).

Later on, after the team's success in various events, the cars became more prominently styled with large orange or black and silver colours; however a hint of the chequered sponsorship squares always remains visible.

Shortly before the 2006 FIFA World Cup, Racing For Holland liveried their cars for the 2006 24 Hours of Le Mans in the motif of a soccer ball, having received support from Dutch soccer legend Johan Cruijff. The move was also intended to show their support for the Dutch team.

== Racing record ==
A1 Grand Prix Results
Year	Car	Team	Races	Wins	Poles	Fast laps	Points	T.C.
2005-06	Lola A1GP-Zytek	A1 Team Netherlands	22	1	0	0	69	7th
2006-07	Lola A1GP-Zytek	A1 Team Netherlands	22	1	1	0	57	5th
2007-08	Lola A1GP-Zytek	A1 Team Netherlands	20	0	1	0	87	7th
2008–09	A1GP-Ferrari	A1 Team Netherlands	14	2	3	1	75	4th

=== Complete 24 Hours of Le Mans results ===
Year	Entrant	No.	Car	Drivers	Class	Laps	Pos.	Class Pos.
1999	(Germany) Konrad Motorsport	26	Lola B98/10-Ford (Roush)	(Netherlands) Tom Coronel (Netherlands) Peter Kox (Netherlands) Jan Lammers	LMP	213	DNF	DNF
2000	(Germany) Konrad Motorsport	20	Lola B2K/10-Ford (Roush)	(Netherlands) Tom Coronel (Netherlands) Peter Kox (Netherlands) Jan Lammers	LMP900	38	DNF	DNF
2001	(Netherlands) Racing for Holland	9	Dome S101-Judd	(Netherlands) Jan Lammers (Netherlands) Donny Crevels (Netherlands) Val Hillebrand	LMP900	156	DNF	DNF
2002	(Netherlands) Racing for Holland	16	Dome S101-Judd	(Netherlands) Jan Lammers (Netherlands) Donny Crevels (Netherlands) Tom Coronel	LMP900	341	8th	7th
2003	(Netherlands) Racing for Holland	15	Dome S101-Judd	(Netherlands) Jan Lammers (Netherlands) John Bosch (United Kingdom) Andy Wallace	LMP900	360	6th	4th
2003	(Netherlands) Racing for Holland	16	Dome S101-Judd	(Bolivia) Felipe Ortiz (Italy) Beppe Gabbiani (France) Tristan Gommendy	LMP900	316	DNF	DNF
2004	(Netherlands) Racing for Holland	15	Dome S101-Judd	(Netherlands) Jan Lammers (United States) Chris Dyson (Japan) Katsutomo Kaneishi	LMP1	341	7th	7th
2004	(Netherlands) Racing for Holland	16	Dome S101-Judd	(Netherlands) Tom Coronel (United Kingdom) Justin Wilson (Republic of Ireland) Ralph Firman	LMP1	313	NC	NC
2005	(Netherlands) Racing for Holland	10	Dome S101-Judd	(Netherlands) Jan Lammers (United States) Elton Julian (Netherlands) John Bosch	LMP1	348	7th	5th
2006	(Netherlands) Racing for Holland	14	Dome S101Hb-Judd	(Netherlands) Jan Lammers (Malaysia) Alex Yoong (Sweden) Stefan Johansson	LMP1	182	DNF	DNF
2007	(Netherlands) Racing for Holland b.v.	14	Dome S101.5-Judd	(Netherlands) Jan Lammers (Netherlands) Jeroen Bleekemolen (Netherlands) David Hart	LMP1	305	25th	8th

FIA Sportscar Championship results
Year	Class	Car	Drivers	Wins	Poles	Fast laps	Points	T.C.
2001	SR1	Dome S101-Judd GV4 4.0L V10	(Netherlands) Jan Lammers (Netherlands) Val Hillebrand	1			82	3rd
2002	SR1	Dome S101-Judd GV4 4.0L V10	(Netherlands) Jan Lammers (Netherlands) Val Hillebrand	3			97	1st
2003	SR1	Dome S101-Judd GV4 4.0L V10	(Netherlands) Jan Lammers (Netherlands) John Bosch	4			62	1st

- T.C. = Teams' Championship position, DNF = Did not finish NC = Not Classified.
