= 2002 FIA Sportscar Championship Magny-Cours =

Layout of the Circuit de Nevers Magny-Cours (1992–2002)

The 2002 FIA Sportscar Championship Magny-Cours was the fourth race for the 2002 FIA Sportscar Championship season held at Circuit de Nevers Magny-Cours, France. It took place on June 30, 2002.

== Official results ==
Class winners in bold. Cars failing to complete 75% of winner's distance marked as Not Classified (NC).

| Pos | Class | No | Team | Drivers | Chassis | Tyre | Laps |
| Pos | Class | No | Team | Drivers | Engine | Tyre | Laps |
|---|---|---|---|---|---|---|---|
| 1 | **SR1** | **8** | **(Netherlands) Racing for Holland** | **(Netherlands) Val Hillebrand (Netherlands) Jan Lammers** | **Dome S101** | G | **95** |
| 1 | **SR1** | **8** | **(Netherlands) Racing for Holland** | **(Netherlands) Val Hillebrand (Netherlands) Jan Lammers** | **Judd GV4 4.0L V10** | G | **95** |
| 2 | SR1 | 16 | (France) Pescarolo Sport | (France) Sébastien Bourdais (France) Jean-Christophe Boullion | Courage C60 Evo | G | 95 |
| 2 | SR1 | 16 | (France) Pescarolo Sport | (France) Sébastien Bourdais (France) Jean-Christophe Boullion | Peugeot A32 3.2L Turbo V6 | G | 95 |
| 3 | SR1 | 6 | (Italy) R & M | (Italy) Vincenzo Sospiri (Italy) Mauro Baldi | R & M SR01 | G | 92 |
| 3 | SR1 | 6 | (Italy) R & M | (Italy) Vincenzo Sospiri (Italy) Mauro Baldi | Judd GV4 4.0L V10 | G | 92 |
| 4 | **SR2** | **77** | **(Italy) GP Racing** | **(Italy) Massimo Saccomanno (Italy) Ernesto Saccomanno** | **Lucchini SR2-99** | G | **87** |
| 4 | **SR2** | **77** | **(Italy) GP Racing** | **(Italy) Massimo Saccomanno (Italy) Ernesto Saccomanno** | **Alfa Romeo 3.0L V6** | G | **87** |
| 5 | SR2 | 61 | (United Kingdom) Team Jota | (United Kingdom) John Stack (United Kingdom) Sam Hignett | Pilbeam MP84 | G | 87 |
| 5 | SR2 | 61 | (United Kingdom) Team Jota | (United Kingdom) John Stack (United Kingdom) Sam Hignett | Nissan (AER) VQL 3.0L V6 | G | 87 |
| 6 | SR2 | 98 | (France) PiR Competition | (France) Marc Rostan (France) Pierre Bruneau | Pilbeam MP84 | A | 85 |
| 6 | SR2 | 98 | (France) PiR Competition | (France) Marc Rostan (France) Pierre Bruneau | Nissan 3.0L V6; Peugeot (Sodemo) 3.0L V6 used for practice | A | 85 |
| 7 | SR2 | 72 | (Italy) S.C.I. | (Italy) Ranieri Randaccio (Italy) Leonardo Maddalena | Lucchini SR2000 | G | 60 |
| 7 | SR2 | 72 | (Italy) S.C.I. | (Italy) Ranieri Randaccio (Italy) Leonardo Maddalena | Alfa Romeo 3.0L V6 | G | 60 |
| DNF | SR1 | 21 | (Italy) Durango Corse | (Italy) Gianmaria Bruni (Italy) Alessandro Battaglin | GMS Durango LMP1 | G | 85 |
| DNF | SR1 | 21 | (Italy) Durango Corse | (Italy) Gianmaria Bruni (Italy) Alessandro Battaglin | Judd GV4 4.0L V10 | G | 85 |
| DNF | SR2 | 99 | (France) PiR Bruneau | (France) Philippe Hottinguer (United Kingdom) Paul Daniels | Debora LMP299 | A | 61 |
| DNF | SR2 | 99 | (France) PiR Bruneau | (France) Philippe Hottinguer (United Kingdom) Paul Daniels | Nissan (AER) VQL 3.0L V6 | A | 61 |
| DNF | SR1 | 10 | (United Kingdom) Bob Berridge Racing | (United Kingdom) Bob Berridge (France) Nicolas Minassian | Lola B98/10 | D | 54 |
| DNF | SR1 | 10 | (United Kingdom) Bob Berridge Racing | (United Kingdom) Bob Berridge (France) Nicolas Minassian | Judd GV4 4.0L V10 | D | 54 |
| DNF | SR2 | 76 | SportsRacing Team Sweden | (Sweden) Niklas Loven (Sweden) Thed Björk (United States) Larry Oberto | Lola B2K/40 | A | 50 |
| DNF | SR2 | 76 | SportsRacing Team Sweden | (Sweden) Niklas Loven (Sweden) Thed Björk (United States) Larry Oberto | Nissan (AER) VQL 3.0L V6 | A | 50 |
| DNF | SR2 | 70 | (France) Debora Automobiles | (France) Gilles Duqueine (France) Jean-François Yvon (France) Michel Maisonneuve | Debora LMP200 | D | 47 |
| DNF | SR2 | 70 | (France) Debora Automobiles | (France) Gilles Duqueine (France) Jean-François Yvon (France) Michel Maisonneuve | BMW 3.0L I6 | D | 47 |
| DNF | SR2 | 60 | (United Kingdom) Team Sovereign | (United Kingdom) Ian Flux (United Kingdom) Mike Millard | Rapier 6 | D | 34 |
| DNF | SR2 | 60 | (United Kingdom) Team Sovereign | (United Kingdom) Ian Flux (United Kingdom) Mike Millard | Nissan (AER) VQL 3.0L V6 | D | 34 |
| DNF | SR2 | 52 | (Italy) Lucchini Engineering | (Italy) Piergiuseppe Peroni (Italy) Mirko Savoldi | Lucchini SR2002 | G | 31 |
| DNF | SR2 | 52 | (Italy) Lucchini Engineering | (Italy) Piergiuseppe Peroni (Italy) Mirko Savoldi | Alfa Romeo 3.0L V6 | G | 31 |
| DNF | SR2 | 83 | (United Kingdom) JCI Developments | (United Kingdom) Darren Manning (United Kingdom) Michael Mallock | Tampolli RTA-2001 | D | 26 |
| DNF | SR2 | 83 | (United Kingdom) JCI Developments | (United Kingdom) Darren Manning (United Kingdom) Michael Mallock | Opel 3.0L V6 | D | 26 |
| DNF | SR2 | 50 | (Italy) Lucchini Engineering | (Italy) Fabio Mancini (Italy) Gianni Collini (Italy) Luca Riccitelli | Lucchini SR2002 | Y | 16 |
| DNF | SR2 | 50 | (Italy) Lucchini Engineering | (Italy) Fabio Mancini (Italy) Gianni Collini (Italy) Luca Riccitelli | Alfa Romeo 3.0L V6 | Y | 16 |
| DNF | SR1 | 13 | (France) Courage Compétition | (France) Didier Cottaz (France) Boris Derichebourg | Courage C60JX | G | 0 |
| DNF | SR1 | 13 | (France) Courage Compétition | (France) Didier Cottaz (France) Boris Derichebourg | Judd GV4 4.0L V10 | G | 0 |
| DNS | SR1 | 19 | (United Kingdom) Simpson Engineering | (United States) Dan Schryvers (United Kingdom) Robin Smith | Riley & Scott Mk III | D | - |
| DNS | SR1 | 19 | (United Kingdom) Simpson Engineering | (United States) Dan Schryvers (United Kingdom) Robin Smith | Chevrolet 5.1L V8 | D | - |

== Statistics ==
- Pole Position - #8 Racing For Holland - 1:27.715
- Fastest Lap - #8 Racing For Holland - 1:29.780
- Distance - 403.750 km
- Average Speed - 161.497 km/h

FIA Sportscar Championship
| Previous race: 2002 FIA Sportscar Championship Brno | 2002 season | Next race: 2002 FIA Sportscar Championship Dijon |
