= 2002 FIA Sportscar Championship Barcelona =

Layout of the Circuit de Catalunya (1995–2003)

The 2002 FIA Sportscar Championship Barcelona was the first race for the 2002 FIA Sportscar Championship season held at Circuit de Catalunya and ran a distance of two hours, thirty minutes. It took place on April 7, 2002.

== Official results ==
Class winners in bold. Cars failing to complete 75% of winner's distance marked as Not Classified (NC).

Pos	Class	No	Team	Drivers	Chassis	Tyre	Laps
Pos	Class	No	Team	Drivers	Engine	Tyre	Laps
1	**SR1**	**16**	**(France) Pescarolo Sport**	**(France) Sébastien Bourdais (France) Jean-Christophe Boullion**	**Courage C60**	G	**81**
1	**SR1**	**16**	**(France) Pescarolo Sport**	**(France) Sébastien Bourdais (France) Jean-Christophe Boullion**	**Peugeot A32 3.2L Turbo V6**	G	**81**
2	SR1	14	(France) Team Oreca	(France) Franck Montagny (Monaco) Olivier Beretta	Dallara SP1	G	80
2	SR1	14	(France) Team Oreca	(France) Franck Montagny (Monaco) Olivier Beretta	Judd GV4 4.0L V10	G	80
3	SR1	7	(United Kingdom) Bob Berridge Racing	(United Kingdom) Bob Berridge (United Kingdom) Ian MacKellar	Lola B98/10	D	78
3	SR1	7	(United Kingdom) Bob Berridge Racing	(United Kingdom) Bob Berridge (United Kingdom) Ian MacKellar	Judd GV4 4.0L V10	D	78
4	SR1	8	(Netherlands) Racing for Holland	(Netherlands) Jan Lammers (Netherlands) Val Hillebrand	Dome S101	G	78
4	SR1	8	(Netherlands) Racing for Holland	(Netherlands) Jan Lammers (Netherlands) Val Hillebrand	Judd GV4 4.0L V10	G	78
5	SR1	13	(France) Courage Compétition	(France) Didier Cottaz (France) Boris Derichebourg	Courage C60	G	77
5	SR1	13	(France) Courage Compétition	(France) Didier Cottaz (France) Boris Derichebourg	Judd GV4 4.0L V10	G	77
6	**SR2**	**52**	**(Italy) Lucchini Engineering**	**(Italy) Mirko Savoldi (Italy) Piergiuseppe Peroni**	**Lucchini SR2001**	G	**77**
6	**SR2**	**52**	**(Italy) Lucchini Engineering**	**(Italy) Mirko Savoldi (Italy) Piergiuseppe Peroni**	**Alfa Romeo 3.0L V6**	G	**77**
7	SR1	21	(Italy) Durango Corse	(Italy) Mirko Venturi (Italy) Alessandro Battaglin	GMS Durango LMP1	A	75
7	SR1	21	(Italy) Durango Corse	(Italy) Mirko Venturi (Italy) Alessandro Battaglin	Judd GV4 4.0L V10	A	75
8	SR2	50	(Italy) Lucchini Engineering	(Italy) Gianni Collini (Italy) Fabio Mancini	Lucchini SR2001	Y	75
8	SR2	50	(Italy) Lucchini Engineering	(Italy) Gianni Collini (Italy) Fabio Mancini	Alfa Romeo 3.0L V6	Y	75
9	SR2	76	SportsRacing Team Sweden	(Sweden) Mattias Andersson (Sweden) Niklas Lovén	Lola B2K/40	A	75
9	SR2	76	SportsRacing Team Sweden	(Sweden) Mattias Andersson (Sweden) Niklas Lovén	Nissan (AER) VQL 3.0L V6	A	75
10	SR2	61	(United Kingdom) Team Jota	(United Kingdom) John Stack (United Kingdom) Sam Hignett	Pilbeam MP84	A	74
10	SR2	61	(United Kingdom) Team Jota	(United Kingdom) John Stack (United Kingdom) Sam Hignett	Nissan (AER) VQL 3.0L V6	A	74
11	SR2	60	(United Kingdom) Team Sovereign	(United Kingdom) Mike Millard (United Kingdom) Ian Flux	Rapier 6	D	70
11	SR2	60	(United Kingdom) Team Sovereign	(United Kingdom) Mike Millard (United Kingdom) Ian Flux	Nissan (AER) VQL 3.0L V6	D	70
12	SR2	65	(Italy) Audisio & Benvenuto Racing	(Italy) Giuseppe Chiminelli (Italy) Antonio Vallebona (Italy) Erminio Bonetti	Lucchini SR2002	A	70
12	SR2	65	(Italy) Audisio & Benvenuto Racing	(Italy) Giuseppe Chiminelli (Italy) Antonio Vallebona (Italy) Erminio Bonetti	Alfa Romeo 3.0L V6	A	70
13	SR2	72	(Italy) S.C.I.	(Italy) Ranieri Randaccio (Italy) Leonardo Maddalena	Lucchini SR2000	A	64
13	SR2	72	(Italy) S.C.I.	(Italy) Ranieri Randaccio (Italy) Leonardo Maddalena	Alfa Romeo 3.0L V6	A	64
DNF	SR2	99	(France) PiR Bruneau	(France) Philippe Hottinguer (United Kingdom) Paul Daniels	Debora LMP299	A	35
DNF	SR2	99	(France) PiR Bruneau	(France) Philippe Hottinguer (United Kingdom) Paul Daniels	Nissan (AER) VQL 3.0L V6	A	35
DNF	SR1	6	(Italy) R & M	(Italy) Mauro Baldi (Italy) Alex Caffi	R & M SR01	G	28
DNF	SR1	6	(Italy) R & M	(Italy) Mauro Baldi (Italy) Alex Caffi	Judd GV4 4.0L V10	G	28
DNF	SR2	98	(France) PiR Bruneau	(France) Marc Rostan (Italy) Arturo Merzario	Pilbeam MP84	A	27
DNF	SR2	98	(France) PiR Bruneau	(France) Marc Rostan (Italy) Arturo Merzario	Peugeot 3.0L V6	A	27
DNF	SR1	19	(United Kingdom) Simpson Engineering	(United Kingdom) Peter Cook (United Kingdom) Richard Smith (United Kingdom) Robin Smith	Riley & Scott Mk III	D	23
DNF	SR1	19	(United Kingdom) Simpson Engineering	(United Kingdom) Peter Cook (United Kingdom) Richard Smith (United Kingdom) Robin Smith	Chevrolet 5.1L V8	D	23

== Statistics ==
- Pole Position - #16 Pescarolo Sport - 1:35.428
- Fastest Lap - #14 Team Oreca - 1:35.161

FIA Sportscar Championship
Previous race: None	2002 season	Next race: 2002 FIA Sportscar Championship Estoril
