= 2002 FIA Sportscar Championship Estoril =

Second race in a FIA sportscar championship

Layout of the Autódromo do Estoril

The 2002 FIA Sportscar Championship Estoril was the second race for the 2002 FIA Sportscar Championship season held at the Autódromo do Estoril and ran a distance of two hours, thirty minutes. It took place on April 14, 2002. The winner was Team Oreca which completed 95 laps around the circuit and for Sports Racing 2 class the winner was Lucchini Engineering with 89 laps.

== Official results ==
Class winners in bold. Cars failing to complete 75% of winner's distance marked as Not Classified (NC).

=== Qualifying results ===
| Pos | Class | No | Team | Drivers | Chassis | Time |
| Pos | Class | No | Team | Drivers | Engine | Time |
|---|---|---|---|---|---|---|
| 1 | **SR1** | **14** | **(France) Team Oreca** | **(Monaco) Olivier Beretta (France) Nicolas Minassian** | **Dallara SP1** | **1:29.401** |
| 1 | **SR1** | **14** | **(France) Team Oreca** | **(Monaco) Olivier Beretta (France) Nicolas Minassian** | **Judd GV4 4.0L V10** | **1:29.401** |
| 2 | SR1 | 8 | (Netherlands) Racing for Holland | (Netherlands) Jan Lammers (Netherlands) Val Hillebrand | Dome S101 | 1:29.936 |
| 2 | SR1 | 8 | (Netherlands) Racing for Holland | (Netherlands) Jan Lammers (Netherlands) Val Hillebrand | Judd GV4 4.0L V10 | 1:29.936 |
| 3 | SR1 | 13 | (France) Courage Competition | (France) Didier Cottaz (France) Boris Derichebourg | Courage C60 | 1:31.568 |
| 3 | SR1 | 13 | (France) Courage Competition | (France) Didier Cottaz (France) Boris Derichebourg | Judd GV4 4.0L V10 | 1:31.568 |
| 4 | SR1 | 16 | (France) Pescarolo Sport | (France) Jean-Christophe Boullion (France) Franck Lagorce | Courage C60 | 1:32.753 |
| 4 | SR1 | 16 | (France) Pescarolo Sport | (France) Jean-Christophe Boullion (France) Franck Lagorce | Peugeot A32 3.2L Turbo V6 | 1:32.753 |
| 5 | SR1 | 21 | (Italy) Durango Corse | (Italy) Mirko Venturi (Italy) Alessandro Battaglin | GMS Durango LMP1 | 1:34.203 |
| 5 | SR1 | 21 | (Italy) Durango Corse | (Italy) Mirko Venturi (Italy) Alessandro Battaglin | Peugeot A32 3.2L Turbo V6 | 1:34.203 |
| 6 | SR1 | 6 | (Italy) R & M | (Italy) Alex Caffi (Italy) Mauro Baldi | R & M SR01 | 1:35.260 |
| 6 | SR1 | 6 | (Italy) R & M | (Italy) Alex Caffi (Italy) Mauro Baldi | Judd GV4 4.0L V10 | 1:35.260 |
| 7 | **SR2** | **52** | **(Italy) Lucchini Engineering** | **(Italy) Piergiuseppe Peroni** **(Italy) Mirko Savoldi** | **Lucchini SR2001** | **1:35.862** |
| 7 | **SR2** | **52** | **(Italy) Lucchini Engineering** | **(Italy) Piergiuseppe Peroni** **(Italy) Mirko Savoldi** | **Alfa Romeo 3.0L V6** | **1:35.862** |
| 8 | SR2 | 50 | (Italy) Lucchini Engineering | (Italy) Gianni Collini (Italy) Fabio Mancini | Lucchini SR2001 | 1:35.895 |
| 8 | SR2 | 50 | (Italy) Lucchini Engineering | (Italy) Gianni Collini (Italy) Fabio Mancini | Alfa Romeo 3.0L V6 | 1:35.895 |
| 9 | SR2 | 76 | SportsRacing Team Sweden | (Sweden) Niklas Lovén (Sweden) Mattias Andersson | Lola B2K/40 | 1:37.616 |
| 9 | SR2 | 76 | SportsRacing Team Sweden | (Sweden) Niklas Lovén (Sweden) Mattias Andersson | Nissan (AER) VQL 3.0L V6 | 1:37.616 |
| 10 | SR2 | 61 | (United Kingdom) Team Jota | (United Kingdom) John Stack (United Kingdom) Sam Hignett | Pilbeam MP84 | 1:38.502 |
| 10 | SR2 | 61 | (United Kingdom) Team Jota | (United Kingdom) John Stack (United Kingdom) Sam Hignett | Nissan (AER) VQL 3.0L V6 | 1:38.502 |
| 11 | SR2 | 99 | (France) PiR Competition | (Portugal) Pedro Couceiro (Portugal) Manuel Gião | Debora LMP299 | 1:39.997 |
| 11 | SR2 | 99 | (France) PiR Competition | (Portugal) Pedro Couceiro (Portugal) Manuel Gião | Nissan (AER) VQL 3.0L V6 | 1:39.997 |
| 12 | SR2 | 72 | (Italy) S.C.I. | (Italy) Leonardo Maddalena (Italy) Ranieri Randaccio | Lucchini SR2000 | 1:40.225 |
| 12 | SR2 | 72 | (Italy) S.C.I. | (Italy) Leonardo Maddalena (Italy) Ranieri Randaccio | Alfa Romeo 3.0L V6 | 1:40.225 |
| 13 | SR2 | 98 | (France) Pierre Bruneau | (France) Marc Rostan (France) Pierre Bruneau (United Kingdom) Paul Daniels | Pilbeam MP84 | 1:41.254 |
| 13 | SR2 | 98 | (France) Pierre Bruneau | (France) Marc Rostan (France) Pierre Bruneau (United Kingdom) Paul Daniels | Nissan 3.0L V6 | 1:41.254 |
| DNS | SR2 | 60 | (United Kingdom) Team Sovereign | (United Kingdom) Mike Millard (United Kingdom) Ian Flux | Rapier 6 | DNS |
| DNS | SR2 | 60 | (United Kingdom) Team Sovereign | (United Kingdom) Mike Millard (United Kingdom) Ian Flux | Nissan (AER) VQL 3.0L V6 | DNS |

=== Race results ===
| Pos | Class | No | Team | Drivers | Chassis | Tyre | Laps | Time |
| Pos | Class | No | Team | Drivers | Engine | Tyre | Laps | Time |
|---|---|---|---|---|---|---|---|---|
| 1 | **SR1** | **14** | **(France) Team Oreca** | **(Monaco) Olivier Beretta (France) Nicolas Minassian** | **Dallara SP1** | G | **95** | **2:30:57.807** |
| 1 | **SR1** | **14** | **(France) Team Oreca** | **(Monaco) Olivier Beretta (France) Nicolas Minassian** | **Judd GV4 4.0L V10** | G | **95** | **2:30:57.807** |
| 2 | SR1 | 13 | (France) Courage Competition | (France) Didier Cottaz (France) Boris Derichebourg | Courage C60 | G | 95 | 2:32:25.584 |
| 2 | SR1 | 13 | (France) Courage Competition | (France) Didier Cottaz (France) Boris Derichebourg | Judd GV4 4.0L V10 | G | 95 | 2:32:25.584 |
| 3 | SR1 | 8 | (Netherlands) Racing for Holland | (Netherlands) Jan Lammers (Netherlands) Val Hillebrand | Dome S101 | G | 94 | 2:31:34.856 |
| 3 | SR1 | 8 | (Netherlands) Racing for Holland | (Netherlands) Jan Lammers (Netherlands) Val Hillebrand | Judd GV4 4.0L V10 | G | 94 | 2:31:34.856 |
| 4 | SR1 | 16 | (France) Pescarolo Sport | (France) Jean-Christophe Boullion (France) Franck Lagorce | Courage C60 | G | 94 | 2:31:56.873 |
| 4 | SR1 | 16 | (France) Pescarolo Sport | (France) Jean-Christophe Boullion (France) Franck Lagorce | Peugeot A32 3.2L Turbo V6 | G | 94 | 2:31:56.873 |
| 5 | SR1 | 6 | (Italy) R & M | (Italy) Alex Caffi (Italy) Mauro Baldi | R & M SR01 | G | 90 | 2:31:36.709 |
| 5 | SR1 | 6 | (Italy) R & M | (Italy) Alex Caffi (Italy) Mauro Baldi | Judd GV4 4.0L V10 | G | 90 | 2:31:36.709 |
| 6 | **SR2** | **52** | **(Italy) Lucchini Engineering** | **(Italy) Piergiuseppe Peroni (Italy) Mirko Savoldi** | **Lucchini SR2001** | G | **89** | **2:32:12.218** |
| 6 | **SR2** | **52** | **(Italy) Lucchini Engineering** | **(Italy) Piergiuseppe Peroni (Italy) Mirko Savoldi** | **Alfa Romeo 3.0L V6** | G | **89** | **2:32:12.218** |
| 7 | SR2 | 50 | (Italy) Lucchini Engineering | (Italy) Gianni Collini (Italy) Fabio Mancini | Lucchini SR2001 | Y | 88 | 2:31:24.905 |
| 7 | SR2 | 50 | (Italy) Lucchini Engineering | (Italy) Gianni Collini (Italy) Fabio Mancini | Alfa Romeo 3.0L V6 | Y | 88 | 2:31:24.905 |
| 8 | SR2 | 76 | SportsRacing Team Sweden | (Sweden) Niklas Lovén (Sweden) Mattias Andersson | Lola B2K/40 | A | 88 | 2:32:35.835 |
| 8 | SR2 | 76 | SportsRacing Team Sweden | (Sweden) Niklas Lovén (Sweden) Mattias Andersson | Nissan (AER) VQL 3.0L V6 | A | 88 | 2:32:35.835 |
| 9 | SR2 | 61 | (United Kingdom) Team Jota | (United Kingdom) John Stack (United Kingdom) Sam Hignett | Pilbeam MP84 | A | 87 | 2:32:35.463 |
| 9 | SR2 | 61 | (United Kingdom) Team Jota | (United Kingdom) John Stack (United Kingdom) Sam Hignett | Nissan (AER) VQL 3.0L V6 | A | 87 | 2:32:35.463 |
| 10 | SR2 | 72 | (Italy) S.C.I. | (Italy) Leonardo Maddalena (Italy) Ranieri Randaccio | Lucchini SR2000 | A | 86 | 2:31:12.730 |
| 10 | SR2 | 72 | (Italy) S.C.I. | (Italy) Leonardo Maddalena (Italy) Ranieri Randaccio | Alfa Romeo 3.0L V6 | A | 86 | 2:31:12.730 |
| 11 | SR2 | 99 | (France) PiR Competition | (Portugal) Pedro Couceiro (Portugal) Manuel Gião | Debora LMP299 | A | 85 | 2:31:00.255 |
| 11 | SR2 | 99 | (France) PiR Competition | (Portugal) Pedro Couceiro (Portugal) Manuel Gião | Nissan (AER) VQL 3.0L V6 | A | 85 | 2:31:00.255 |
| DNF | SR1 | 21 | (Italy) Durango Corse | (Italy) Mirko Venturi (Italy) Alessandro Battaglin | GMS Durango LMP1 | A | 35 | 1:00:55.380 |
| DNF | SR1 | 21 | (Italy) Durango Corse | (Italy) Mirko Venturi (Italy) Alessandro Battaglin | Judd GV4 4.0L V10 | A | 35 | 1:00:55.380 |
| DNF | SR2 | 98 | (France) Pierre Bruneau | (France) Marc Rostan (France) Pierre Bruneau (United Kingdom) Paul Daniels | Pilbeam MP84 | A | 13 | 41:20.977 |
| DNF | SR2 | 98 | (France) Pierre Bruneau | (France) Marc Rostan (France) Pierre Bruneau (United Kingdom) Paul Daniels | Nissan 3.0L V6 | A | 13 | 41:20.977 |
| DNS | SR2 | 60 | (United Kingdom) Team Sovereign | (United Kingdom) Mike Millard (United Kingdom) Ian Flux | Rapier 6 | D | 0 | DNS |
| DNS | SR2 | 60 | (United Kingdom) Team Sovereign | (United Kingdom) Mike Millard (United Kingdom) Ian Flux | Nissan (AER) VQL 3.0L V6 | D | 0 | DNS |

== Statistics ==
- Pole Position - #14 Team Oreca - 1:29.401
- Fastest Lap - #14 Team Oreca - 1:31.442

FIA Sportscar Championship
| Previous race: 2002 FIA Sportscar Championship Barcelona | 2002 season | Next race: 2002 FIA Sportscar Championship Brno |
