= 2002 FIA Sportscar Championship Brno =

Layout of the Brno Circuit

The 2002 FIA Sportscar Championship Brno was the third race for the 2002 FIA Sportscar Championship season held at Masaryk Circuit and ran a distance of two hours, thirty minutes. It took place on 18 May 2002.

== Official results ==
Class winners in bold. Cars failing to complete 75% of winner's distance marked as Not Classified (NC).

Pos	Class	No	Team	Drivers	Chassis	Tyre	Laps
Pos	Class	No	Team	Drivers	Engine	Tyre	Laps
1	**SR1**	**8**	**(Netherlands) Racing for Holland**	**(Netherlands) Val Hillebrand (Netherlands) Jan Lammers**	**Dome S101**	G	**77**
1	**SR1**	**8**	**(Netherlands) Racing for Holland**	**(Netherlands) Val Hillebrand (Netherlands) Jan Lammers**	**Judd GV4 4.0L V10**	G	**77**
2	SR1	13	(France) Courage Compétition	(France) Didier Cottaz (France) Boris Derichebourg	Courage C60JX	G	77
2	SR1	13	(France) Courage Compétition	(France) Didier Cottaz (France) Boris Derichebourg	Judd GV4 4.0L V10	G	77
3	SR1	6	(Italy) R & M	(Italy) Vincenzo Sospiri (Italy) Mauro Baldi	R & M SR01	G	75
3	SR1	6	(Italy) R & M	(Italy) Vincenzo Sospiri (Italy) Mauro Baldi	Judd GV4 4.0L V10	G	75
4	**SR2**	**50**	**(Italy) Lucchini Engineering**	**(Italy) Fabio Mancini (Italy) Gianni Collini (Italy) Luca Riccitelli**	**Lucchini SR2002**	Y	**72**
4	**SR2**	**50**	**(Italy) Lucchini Engineering**	**(Italy) Fabio Mancini (Italy) Gianni Collini (Italy) Luca Riccitelli**	**Alfa Romeo 3.0L V6**	Y	**72**
5	SR2	72	(Italy) S.C.I.	(Italy) Ranieri Randaccio (Italy) Leonardo Maddalena	Lucchini SR2000	G	72
5	SR2	72	(Italy) S.C.I.	(Italy) Ranieri Randaccio (Italy) Leonardo Maddalena	Alfa Romeo 3.0L V6	G	72
6	SR2	76	SportsRacing Team Sweden	(Sweden) Niklas Lovén (Sweden) Mattias Andersson	Lola B2K/40	A	72
6	SR2	76	SportsRacing Team Sweden	(Sweden) Niklas Lovén (Sweden) Mattias Andersson	Nissan (AER) VQL 3.0L V6	A	72
7	SR2	61	(United Kingdom) Team Jota	(United Kingdom) John Stack (United Kingdom) Sam Hignett	Pilbeam MP84	G	72
7	SR2	61	(United Kingdom) Team Jota	(United Kingdom) John Stack (United Kingdom) Sam Hignett	Nissan (AER) VQL 3.0L V6	G	72
8	SR1	33	(Germany) Eventus Motorsport	(United Kingdom) Christian Vann (Germany) Ralph Moog	Lola B98/10	A	68
8	SR1	33	(Germany) Eventus Motorsport	(United Kingdom) Christian Vann (Germany) Ralph Moog	Ford (Roush) 6.0L V8	A	68
NC	SR1	21	(Italy) Durango Corse	(France) Jean-Philippe Belloc (Italy) Alessandro Battaglin	GMS Durango LMP1	G	74
NC	SR1	21	(Italy) Durango Corse	(France) Jean-Philippe Belloc (Italy) Alessandro Battaglin	Judd GV4 4.0L V10	G	74
DNF	SR2	55	(Austria) Renauer Motorsport	(Italy) Angelo Lancelotti (Austria) Gottfried Cepin (Czech Republic) Petr Válek	Tampolli RTA2001	G	44
DNF	SR2	55	(Austria) Renauer Motorsport	(Italy) Angelo Lancelotti (Austria) Gottfried Cepin (Czech Republic) Petr Válek	Alfa Romeo 3.0L V6	G	44
DNF	SR2	98	(France) PiR Bruneau	(France) Marc Rostan (United Kingdom) Paul Daniels (Italy) Arturo Merzario	Pilbeam MP84	A	26
DNF	SR2	98	(France) PiR Bruneau	(France) Marc Rostan (United Kingdom) Paul Daniels (Italy) Arturo Merzario	Nissan (AER) 3.0L V6	A	26
DNF	SR2	52	(Italy) Lucchini Engineering	(Italy) Piergiuseppe Peroni (Italy) Mirko Savoldi	Lucchini SR2002	G	16
DNF	SR2	52	(Italy) Lucchini Engineering	(Italy) Piergiuseppe Peroni (Italy) Mirko Savoldi	Alfa Romeo 3.0L V6	G	16
DNS	SR2	99	(France) PiR Bruneau	(France) Pierre Bruneau (United Kingdom) Paul Daniels	Debora LMP299	A	-
DNS	SR2	99	(France) PiR Bruneau	(France) Pierre Bruneau (United Kingdom) Paul Daniels	Nissan (AER) VQL 3.0L V6	A	-

== Statistics ==
- Pole Position - #8 Racing For Holland - 1:51.005
- Fastest Lap - #8 Racing For Holland - 1:51.858

FIA Sportscar Championship
Previous race: 2002 FIA Sportscar Championship Estoril	2002 season	Next race: 2002 FIA Sportscar Championship Magny-Cours
