= 2002 FIA Sportscar Championship =

Motorsport season

Seasons
- ← 2001 2003 →

The 2002 FIA Sportscar Championship was the second season of the FIA Sportscar Championship, an auto racing series regulated by the Fédération Internationale de l'Automobile and organized by the International Racing Series Ltd. It was the sixth season of the series dating back to the International Sports Racing Series of 1997. The series featured sports prototypes in two categories, SR1 and SR2, and awarded championships for drivers, teams, and manufacturers in each respective category. The series began on 7 April 2002 and ended on 22 September 2002 after six races held in Europe.

The SR1 championships were won by Jan Lammers' Racing for Holland outfit, with Lammers sharing the drivers' championship with Val Hillebrand and securing Dome their first title outside Japan. Italian Lucchini Engineering earned the SR2 titles for their own team and chassis; Mirko Savoldi and Pierguiseppe Peroni won the drivers championship for the team.

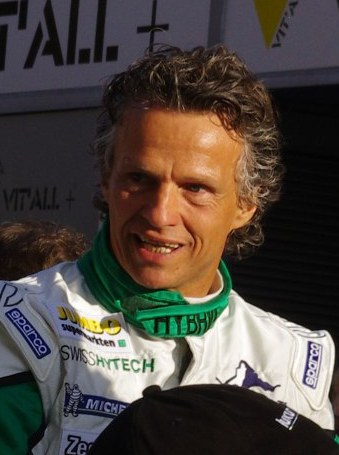
Jan Lammers (pictured in 2011), co-champion in the SR1 category

== Schedule ==
Although initially planned to match the length of the 2001 calendar at eight events, the 2002 calendar for the championship was shortened following several cancellations mid-season. The 1000 km endurance race at Monza was dropped in the initial calendar, meaning all races were set to a limit of 2 hours and 30 minutes. Barcelona, Spa, Brno, Magny-Cours, and the Nürburgring were all retained from 2001, while Imola, Rockingham, and Autódromo do Estoril were all scheduled to debut in the series. Later cancellations of the Imola and Rockingham rounds were replaced by a new event at Dijon, while the Nürburgring event was also canceled as the season progressed. The end of the event at Rockingham made this the only season of the championship not to feature an event held in the United Kingdom.

Rnd	Race	Circuit	Date
1	FIA Sportscar Championship Barcelona	Circuit de Catalunya, Montmeló, Spain	7 April
2	FIA Sportscar Championship Estoril	Autódromo do Estoril, Estoril, Portugal	14 April
3	Olympia LG Super Racing Weekend Brno	Autodrom Brno, Brno, Czech Republic	18 May
4	FIA Sportscar Championship Magny-Cours	Circuit de Nevers Magny-Cours, Magny-Cours, France	30 June
5	FIA Sportscar Championship Dijon	Dijon-Prenois, Dijon, France	18 August
6	Racing Festival	Circuit de Spa-Francorchamps, Stavelot, Belgium	22 September

== Entries ==
=== SR1 ===
Entrant	Car	Engine	Tyre	No.	Drivers	Rounds
(Italy) R&M	R&M SR01	Judd GV4 4.0 L V10	G	6	(Italy) Mauro Baldi	1–4, 6
(Italy) R&M	R&M SR01	Judd GV4 4.0 L V10	G	6	(Italy) Alex Caffi	1–2
(Italy) R&M	R&M SR01	Judd GV4 4.0 L V10	G	6	(Italy) Vincenzo Sospiri	3–4, 6
(United Kingdom) Bob Berridge Racing	Lola B98/10	Judd GV4 4.0 L V10	G	7; 10	(United Kingdom) Bob Berridge	1, 4, 6
(United Kingdom) Bob Berridge Racing	Lola B98/10	Judd GV4 4.0 L V10	G	7; 10	(United Kingdom) Ian McKellar	1
(United Kingdom) Bob Berridge Racing	Lola B98/10	Judd GV4 4.0 L V10	G	7; 10	(France) Nicolas Minassian	4
(United Kingdom) Bob Berridge Racing	Lola B98/10	Judd GV4 4.0 L V10	G	7; 10	(United Kingdom) Jason Plato	6
(Netherlands) Racing for Holland	Dome S101	Judd GV4 4.0 L V10	G	8	(Netherlands) Jan Lammers	All
(Netherlands) Racing for Holland	Dome S101	Judd GV4 4.0 L V10	G	8	(Netherlands) Val Hillebrand	All
(Netherlands) Racing for Holland	Dome S101	Judd GV4 4.0 L V10	G	9	(Italy) Beppe Gabbiani	5–6
(Netherlands) Racing for Holland	Dome S101	Judd GV4 4.0 L V10	G	9	(Bolivia) Filipe Ortiz	5–6
(France) Courage Compétition	Courage C60JX	Judd GV4 4.0 L V10	G	13	(France) Didier Cottaz	1–4
(France) Courage Compétition	Courage C60JX	Judd GV4 4.0 L V10	G	13	(France) Boris Derichebourg	1–4
(France) Courage Compétition	Courage C60JX	Judd GV4 4.0 L V10	G	13	(Sweden) Thed Björk	1
(France) Team Oreca	Dallara SP1	Judd GV4 4.0 L V10	G	14	(Monaco) Olivier Beretta	1–2
(France) Team Oreca	Dallara SP1	Judd GV4 4.0 L V10	G	14	(France) Franck Montagny	1
(France) Team Oreca	Dallara SP1	Judd GV4 4.0 L V10	G	14	(France) Nicolas Minassian	2
(France) Pescarolo Sport	Courage C60	Peugeot A32 3.2 L Turbo V6	G	16	(France) Jean-Christophe Boullion	1–2, 4–6
(France) Pescarolo Sport	Courage C60	Peugeot A32 3.2 L Turbo V6	G	16	(France) Sébastien Bourdais	1, 4, 6
(France) Pescarolo Sport	Courage C60	Peugeot A32 3.2 L Turbo V6	G	16	(France) Franck Lagorce	2, 5
(United Kingdom) Simpson Engineering	Riley & Scott Mk III	Chevrolet 5.1 L V8	D G	19	(United Kingdom) Robin Smith	1, 4, 6
(United Kingdom) Simpson Engineering	Riley & Scott Mk III	Chevrolet 5.1 L V8	D G	19	(United Kingdom) Richard Jones	1, 6
(United Kingdom) Simpson Engineering	Riley & Scott Mk III	Chevrolet 5.1 L V8	D G	19	(United Kingdom) Peter Cook	1
(United Kingdom) Simpson Engineering	Riley & Scott Mk III	Chevrolet 5.1 L V8	D G	19	(United States) Dan Schryvers	4
(United Kingdom) Simpson Engineering	Riley & Scott Mk III	Chevrolet 5.1 L V8	D G	19	(Belgium) Bernard de Dryver	6
(Italy) Durango Corse	Durango LMP1	Judd GV4 4.0 L V10	A G	21	(Italy) Alessandro Battaglin	1–4, 6
(Italy) Durango Corse	Durango LMP1	Judd GV4 4.0 L V10	A G	21	(Italy) Mirko Venturi	1–2
(Italy) Durango Corse	Durango LMP1	Judd GV4 4.0 L V10	A G	21	(France) Jean-Philippe Belloc	3
(Italy) Durango Corse	Durango LMP1	Judd GV4 4.0 L V10	A G	21	(Italy) Gianmaria Bruni	4, 6
(Germany) Eventus Motorsport	Lola B98/10	Ford 6.0 L V8	A	33	(Germany) Ralph Moog	3, 5
(Germany) Eventus Motorsport	Lola B98/10	Ford 6.0 L V8	A	33	(United Kingdom) Christian Vann	3
(Germany) Eventus Motorsport	Lola B98/10	Ford 6.0 L V8	A	33	(Switzerland) Georg Paulin	5

=== SR2 ===
Entrant	Car	Engine	Tyre	No.	Drivers	Rounds
(Italy) Lucchini Engineering	Lucchini SR2001	Alfa Romeo 3.0 L V6	Y	50	(Italy) Gianni Collini	All
(Italy) Lucchini Engineering	Lucchini SR2001	Alfa Romeo 3.0 L V6	Y	50	(Italy) Fabio Mancini	All
(Italy) Lucchini Engineering	Lucchini SR2001	Alfa Romeo 3.0 L V6	Y	50	(Italy) Luca Riccitelli	3
(Italy) Lucchini Engineering	Lucchini SR2001	Alfa Romeo 3.0 L V6	A G	52	(Italy) Pierguiseppe Peroni	All
(Italy) Lucchini Engineering	Lucchini SR2001	Alfa Romeo 3.0 L V6	A G	52	(Italy) Mirko Savoldi	All
(Italy) Siliprandi	Lucchini SR2-99	Alfa Romeo 3.0 L V6	D	53	(Italy) Ezio Mazza	1
(Italy) Siliprandi	Lucchini SR2-99	Alfa Romeo 3.0 L V6	D	53	(Switzerland) Georg Paulin	1
(Austria) Renauer Motorsport	Tampolli SR2 RTA-2001	Alfa Romeo 3.0 L V6	G	55	(Italy) Angelo Lancelotti	3
(Austria) Renauer Motorsport	Tampolli SR2 RTA-2001	Alfa Romeo 3.0 L V6	G	55	(Austria) Gottfreid Cepin	3
(Austria) Renauer Motorsport	Tampolli SR2 RTA-2001	Alfa Romeo 3.0 L V6	G	55	(Czech Republic) Petr Válek	3
(United Kingdom) Team Sovereign	Rapier 6	Nissan 3.0 L V6	D	60	(United Kingdom) Mike Millard	1–2, 4–6
(United Kingdom) Team Sovereign	Rapier 6	Nissan 3.0 L V6	D	60	(United Kingdom) Ian Flux	1–2, 4
(United Kingdom) Team Sovereign	Rapier 6	Nissan 3.0 L V6	D	60	(United Kingdom) Phillip Armour	5–6
(United Kingdom) Team Jota	Pilbeam MP84	Nissan 3.0 L V6	A G	61	(United Kingdom) Sam Hignett	All
(United Kingdom) Team Jota	Pilbeam MP84	Nissan 3.0 L V6	A G	61	(United Kingdom) John Stack	All
(Italy) Audisio & Benvenuto Racing	Lucchini SR2002	Alfa Romeo 3.0 L V6	A	65	(Italy) Giuseppe Chiminelli	1
(Italy) Audisio & Benvenuto Racing	Lucchini SR2002	Alfa Romeo 3.0 L V6	A	65	(Italy) Antonio Vallebona	1
(Italy) Audisio & Benvenuto Racing	Lucchini SR2002	Alfa Romeo 3.0 L V6	A	65	(Italy) Erminio Bonetti	1
(France) Debora Automobiles	Debora LMP200	BMW 3.0 L I6	D	70	(France) Gilles Duqueine	4–6
(France) Debora Automobiles	Debora LMP200	BMW 3.0 L I6	D	70	(France) Jean-François Yvon	4
(France) Debora Automobiles	Debora LMP200	BMW 3.0 L I6	D	70	(France) Michel Maisonneuve	4
(France) Debora Automobiles	Debora LMP200	BMW 3.0 L I6	D	70	(France) Dominique Lacaud	5
(France) Debora Automobiles	Debora LMP200	BMW 3.0 L I6	D	70	(Belgium) Didier Miquée	5
(France) Debora Automobiles	Debora LMP200	BMW 3.0 L I6	D	70	(France) Xavier Bich	6
(France) Debora Automobiles	Debora LMP200	BMW 3.0 L I6	D	70	(Switzerland) Roland Bossy	6
(Italy) SCI	Lucchini SR2000	Alfa Romeo 3.0 L V6	A G	72	(Italy) Ranieri Randaccio	All
(Italy) SCI	Lucchini SR2000	Alfa Romeo 3.0 L V6	A G	72	(Italy) Leonardo Maddalena	All
Sportsracing Team Sweden	Lola B2K/40	Nissan 3.0 L V6	A G	76	(Sweden) Niklas Loven	All
Sportsracing Team Sweden	Lola B2K/40	Nissan 3.0 L V6	A G	76	(Sweden) Mattias Andersson	1–3
Sportsracing Team Sweden	Lola B2K/40	Nissan 3.0 L V6	A G	76	(United States) Larry Oberto	4–5
Sportsracing Team Sweden	Lola B2K/40	Nissan 3.0 L V6	A G	76	(Sweden) Thed Björk	4, 6
(Italy) GP Motorsport	Lucchini SR2-99	Alfa Romeo 3.0 L V6	G	77	(Italy) Massimo Saccomanno	4
(Italy) GP Motorsport	Lucchini SR2-99	Alfa Romeo 3.0 L V6	G	77	(Italy) Ernesto Saccomanno	4
(United Kingdom) JCI Developments	Tampolli SR2 RTA-2001	Opel 3.0 L V6	D	83	(United Kingdom) Michael Mallock	4, 6
(United Kingdom) JCI Developments	Tampolli SR2 RTA-2001	Opel 3.0 L V6	D	83	(United Kingdom) Darren Manning	4
(United Kingdom) JCI Developments	Tampolli SR2 RTA-2001	Opel 3.0 L V6	D	83	(United Kingdom) Rob Croydon	6
(France) PiR Competition	Pilbeam MP84	Peugeot 3.0 L V6; Nissan VQL 3.0 L V6	A	98	(France) Marc Rostan	1–5
(France) PiR Competition	Pilbeam MP84	Peugeot 3.0 L V6; Nissan VQL 3.0 L V6	A	98	(Italy) Arturo Merzario	1, 3
(France) PiR Competition	Pilbeam MP84	Peugeot 3.0 L V6; Nissan VQL 3.0 L V6	A	98	(United Kingdom) Paul Daniels	2–3, 6
(France) PiR Competition	Pilbeam MP84	Peugeot 3.0 L V6; Nissan VQL 3.0 L V6	A	98	(France) Pierre Bruneau	2, 4–6
(France) PiR Competition	Debora LMP200	Nissan 3.0 L V6	A	99	(United Kingdom) Paul Daniels	1, 3–5
(France) PiR Competition	Debora LMP200	Nissan 3.0 L V6	A	99	(France) Pierre Bruneau	1, 3
(France) PiR Competition	Debora LMP200	Nissan 3.0 L V6	A	99	(France) Philippe Hottingeur	1, 4
(France) PiR Competition	Debora LMP200	Nissan 3.0 L V6	A	99	(Portugal) Pedro Couceiro	2
(France) PiR Competition	Debora LMP200	Nissan 3.0 L V6	A	99	(Portugal) Manuel Gião	2
(France) PiR Competition	Debora LMP200	Nissan 3.0 L V6	A	99	(United Kingdom) Rob Croydon	5
(France) PiR Competition	Debora LMP200	Nissan 3.0 L V6	A	99	(Belgium) Frédéric Bouvy	6
(France) PiR Competition	Debora LMP200	Nissan 3.0 L V6	A	99	(Belgium) Christophe Geoffroy	6
(France) PiR Competition	Debora LMP200	Nissan 3.0 L V6	A	99	(Belgium) David Sterckx	6

== Results and standings ==
=== Race results ===
Rnd	Circuit	SR1 Winning Team	SR2 Winning Team	Reports
Rnd	Circuit	SR1 Winning Drivers	SR2 Winning Drivers	Reports
1	Barcelona	(France) No. 16 Pescarolo Sport	(Italy) No. 52 Lucchini Engineering	Report
1	Barcelona	(France) Jean-Christophe Boullion (France) Sébastien Bourdais	(Italy) Mirko Savoldi (Italy) Piergiuseppe Peroni	Report
2	Estoril	(France) No. 14 Team Oreca	(Italy) No. 52 Lucchini Engineering	Report
2	Estoril	(France) Nicolas Minassian (Monaco) Olivier Beretta	(Italy) Mirko Savoldi (Italy) Piergiuseppe Peroni	Report
3	Brno	(Netherlands) No. 8 Racing for Holland	(Italy) No. 50 Lucchini Engineering	Report
3	Brno	(Netherlands) Jan Lammers (Netherlands) Val Hillebrand	(Italy) Fabio Mancini (Italy) Gianni Collini	Report
4	Magny-Cours	(Netherlands) No. 8 Racing for Holland	(Italy) No. 77 GP Racing	Report
4	Magny-Cours	(Netherlands) Jan Lammers (Netherlands) Val Hillebrand	(Italy) Ernesto Saccomanno (Italy) Massimo Saccomanno	Report
5	Dijon	(Netherlands) No. 8 Racing for Holland	(Italy) No. 52 Lucchini Engineering	Report
5	Dijon	(Netherlands) Jan Lammers (Netherlands) Val Hillebrand	(Italy) Mirko Savoldi (Italy) Piergiuseppe Peroni	Report
6	Spa	(France) No. 16 Pescarolo Sport	(Italy) No. 50 Lucchini Engineering	Report
6	Spa	(France) Jean-Christophe Boullion (France) Sébastien Bourdais	(Italy) Fabio Mancini (Italy) Gianni Collini	Report

Points were awarded to the top ten finishers in each category. Entries were required to complete 60% of the race distance in order to be classified as a finisher and earn points. Drivers were required to complete 20% of the total race distance for their car to earn points. Teams scored points for only their highest finishing entry.

Points system
Event	1st	2nd	3rd	4th	5th	6th	7th	8th	9th	10th
Races	20	15	12	10	8	6	4	3	2	1

=== Driver championships ===
==== SR1 ====
The SR1 class of the 2002 FIA Sportscar Championship for Drivers was won by Val Hillerbrand and Jan Lammers sharing a Dome-Judd entered by Racing for Holland.

Pos.	Driver	Team	BAR (Spain)	EST (Portugal)	BRN (Czech Republic)	MAG (France)	DIJ (France)	SPA (Belgium)	Total points
1	(Netherlands) Jan Lammers	(Netherlands) Racing for Holland	4	3	1	1	1	2	97
1	(Netherlands) Val Hillebrand	(Netherlands) Racing for Holland	4	3	1	1	1	2	97
3	(France) Jean-Christophe Boullion	(France) Pescarolo Sport	1	4		2	3	1	77
4	(France) Sébastien Bourdais	(France) Pescarolo Sport	1			2		1	55
5	(Italy) Mauro Baldi	(Italy) R&M	Ret	5	3	3		3	44
6	(France) Didier Cottaz	(France) Courage Compétition	5	2	2	Ret			38
6	(France) Boris Derichebourg	(France) Courage Compétition	5	2	2	Ret			38
8	(Italy) Vincenzo Sospiri	(Italy) R&M			3	3		3	36
9	(Monaco) Olivier Beretta	(France) Team Oreca	2	1					35
10	(United Kingdom) Bob Berridge	(United Kingdom) Bob Berridge Racing	3			Ret		4	22
10	(France) Franck Lagorce	(France) Pescarolo Sport		4			3		22
12	(Bolivia) Filipe Ortiz	(Netherlands) Racing for Holland					2	6	21
12	(Italy) Beppe Gabbiani	(Netherlands) Racing for Holland					2	6	21
14	(France) Nicolas Minassian	(France) Team Oreca		1					20
14	(France) Nicolas Minassian	(United Kingdom) Bob Berridge Racing				Ret			20
15	(France) Franck Montagny	(France) Team Oreca	2						15
16	(Italy) Alessandro Battaglin	(Italy) Durango Corse	6	Ret	NC	Ret		5	14
17	(United Kingdom) Ian McKellar	(United Kingdom) Bob Berridge Racing	3						12
18	(Germany) Ralph Moog	(Germany) Eventus Motorsport			4		DNS		10
18	(United Kingdom) Christian Vann	(Germany) Eventus Motorsport			4				10
18	(United Kingdom) Jason Plato	(United Kingdom) Bob Berridge Racing						4	10
21	(Italy) Alex Caffi	(Italy) R&M	Ret	5					8
21	(Italy) Gianmaria Bruni	(Italy) Durango Corse				Ret		5	8
23	(Italy) Mirko Venturi	(Italy) Durango Corse	6	Ret					6
24	(United Kingdom) Robin Smith	(United Kingdom) Simpson Engineering	Ret			DNS		7	4
24	(United Kingdom) Richard Jones	(United Kingdom) Simpson Engineering	Ret					7	4
24	(Belgium) Bernard de Dryver	(United Kingdom) Simpson Engineering						7	4

Colour	Result
Gold	Winner
Silver	Second place
Bronze	Third place
Green	Points classification
Blue	Non-points classification
Blue	Non-classified finish (NC)
Purple	Retired, not classified (Ret)
Red	Did not qualify (DNQ)
Red	Did not pre-qualify (DNPQ)
Black	Disqualified (DSQ)
White	Did not start (DNS)
White	Withdrew (WD)
White	Race cancelled (C)
Blank	Did not practice (DNP)
Blank	Did not arrive (DNA)
Blank	Excluded (EX)

==== SR2 ====
The SR2 class of the 2002 FIA Sportscar Championship for Drivers was won by Piergiuseppe Peroni and Mirko Savoldi sharing a Lucchini-Alfa Romeo entered by Lucchini Engineering.

Pos.	Driver	Team	BAR (Spain)	EST (Portugal)	BRN (Czech Republic)	MAG (France)	DIJ (France)	SPA (Belgium)	Total points
1	(Italy) Pierguiseppe Peroni	(Italy) Lucchini Engineering	1	1	Ret	Ret	1	2	75
1	(Italy) Mirko Savoldi	(Italy) Lucchini Engineering	1	1	Ret	Ret	1	2	75
3	(Italy) Fabio Mancini	(Italy) Lucchini Engineering	2	2	1	Ret	Ret	1	70
3	(Italy) Gianni Collini	(Italy) Lucchini Engineering	2	2	1	Ret	Ret	1	70
5	(United Kingdom) Sam Hignett	(United Kingdom) Team Jota	4	4	4	2	2	Ret	60
5	(United Kingdom) John Stack	(United Kingdom) Team Jota	4	4	4	2	2	Ret	60
7	(Sweden) Niklas Loven	Sportsracing Team Sweden	3	3	3	Ret	Ret	3	48
8	(Italy) Ranieri Randaccio	(Italy) SCI	7	5	2	4	Ret	5	45
8	(Italy) Leonardo Maddelena	(Italy) SCI	7	5	2	4	Ret	5	45
10	(Sweden) Mattias Andersson	Sportsracing Team Sweden	3	3	3				36
11	(France) Pierre Bruneau	(France) PiR Competition	DNS	Ret	DNS	3	3	Ret	24
11	(France) Marc Rostan	(France) PiR Competition	Ret	Ret	Ret	3	3		24
13	(Italy) Luca Riccitelli	(Italy) Lucchini Engineering			1				20
13	(Italy) Massimo Saccomanno	(Italy) GP Motorsport				1			20
13	(Italy) Ernesto Saccomanno	(Italy) GP Motorsport				1			20
16	(United Kingdom) Mike Millard	(United Kingdom) Team Sovereign	5	DNS		Ret	4	Ret	18
17	(Sweden) Thed Björk	Sportsracing Team Sweden						3	12
17	(United Kingdom) Rob Croydon	(France) PiR Competition					6		12
17	(United Kingdom) Rob Croydon	(United Kingdom) JCI Developments						6	12
19	(United Kingdom) Phillip Armour	(United Kingdom) Team Sovereign					4	Ret	10
19	(France) Xavier Bich	(France) Debora Automobiles						4	10
19	(Switzerland) Roland Bossy	(France) Debora Automobiles						4	10
22	(United Kingdom) Ian Flux	(United Kingdom) Team Sovereign	5	DNS		Ret			8
22	(France) Gilles Duqueine	(France) Debora Automobiles				Ret	5	DNS	8
22	(France) Dominique Lacaud	(France) Debora Automobiles					5		8
22	(Belgium) Didier Miquée	(France) Debora Automobiles					5		8
26	(Italy) Erminio Bonetti	(Italy) Audisio & Benvenuto Racing	6						6
26	(Italy) Antonio Vallebona	(Italy) Audisio & Benvenuto Racing	6						6
26	(Italy) Giuseppe Chiminelli	(Italy) Audisio & Benvenuto Racing	6						6
26	(Portugal) Pedro Couceiro	(France) PiR Competition		6					6
26	(Portugal) Manuel Gião	(France) PiR Competition		6					6
26	(United Kingdom) Paul Daniels	(France) PiR Competition	Ret	Ret	Ret	Ret	6	Ret	6
26	(United Kingdom) Michael Mallock	(United Kingdom) JCI Developments				Ret		6	6

=== Team championships ===
==== SR1 ====
Pos.	Team	BAR (Spain)	EST (Portugal)	BRN (Czech Republic)	MAG (France)	DIJ (France)	SPA (Belgium)	Total points
1	(Netherlands) Racing for Holland	4	3	1	1	1	2	97
2	(France) Pescarolo Sport	1	4		2	3	1	77
3	(Italy) R&M	Ret	5	3	3		3	44
4	(France) Courage Compétition	5	2	2	Ret			38
5	(France) Team Oreca	2	1					35
6	(United Kingdom) Bob Berridge Racing	3			Ret		4	22
7	(Italy) Durango Corse	6	Ret	NC	Ret		5	14
8	(Germany) Eventus Motorsport			4		Ret		10
9	(United Kingdom) Simpson Engineering	Ret			DNS		7	4

==== SR2 ====
Pos.	Team	BAR (Spain)	EST (Portugal)	BRN (Czech Republic)	MAG (France)	DIJ (France)	SPA (Belgium)	Total points
1	(Italy) Lucchini Engineering	1	1	1	Ret	1	1	100
2	(United Kingdom) Team Jota	4	4	4	2	2	Ret	60
3	Sportsracing Team Sweden	3	3	3	Ret	Ret	3	48
4	(Italy) SCI	7	5	2	4	Ret	5	45
5	(France) PiR Competition	Ret	6	Ret	3	3	Ret	30
6	(Italy) GP Motorsport				1			20
7	(United Kingdom) Team Sovereign	5	DNS		Ret	4	Ret	18
7	(France) Debora Automobiles				Ret	5	4	18
9	(Italy) Audisio & Benvenuto Racing	6						6
9	(United Kingdom) JCI Developments				Ret		6	6

=== Constructors championships ===
==== SR1 ====
Dome were awarded the SR1 constructors championship by tie-breaker for their three victories against Courage's two.

Pos.	Constructor	BAR (Spain)	EST (Portugal)	BRN (Czech Republic)	MAG (France)	DIJ (France)	SPA (Belgium)	Total points
1	(Japan) Dome	4	3	1	1	1	2	97
2	(France) Courage	1	2	2	2	3	1	97
3	(Italy) R&M	Ret	5	3	3		3	44
4	(Italy) Dallara	2	1					35
5	(United Kingdom) Lola	3		4	Ret	DNS	4	32
6	(Italy) Durango	6	Ret	NC	Ret		5	14
7	(United States) Riley & Scott	Ret			DNS		7	4

==== SR2 ====
Pos.	Constructor	BAR (Spain)	EST (Portugal)	BRN (Czech Republic)	MAG (France)	DIJ (France)	SPA (Belgium)	Total points
1	(Italy) Lucchini	1	1	1	1	1	1	120
2	(United Kingdom) Pilbeam	4	4	4	2	2	Ret	60
3	(United Kingdom) Lola	3	3	3	Ret	Ret	3	48
4	(France) Debora	Ret	6	DNS	Ret	5	4	24
5	(United Kingdom) LM 3000 (Rapier)	5	DNS		Ret	4	Ret	18
6	(Italy) Tampolli			Ret	Ret		6	6
