= 2002 FIA Sportscar Championship Dijon =

Layout of the Dijon circuit

The 2002 FIA Sportscar Championship Dijon was the fifth race for the 2002 FIA Sportscar Championship season held at Dijon-Prenois, France. It took place on August 18, 2002.

== Official results ==
Class winners in bold. Cars failing to complete 75% of winner's distance marked as Not Classified (NC).

Pos	Class	No	Team	Drivers	Chassis	Tyre	Laps
Pos	Class	No	Team	Drivers	Engine	Tyre	Laps
1	**SR1**	**8**	**(Netherlands) Racing for Holland**	**(Netherlands) Val Hillebrand (Netherlands) Jan Lammers**	**Dome S101**	G	**118**
1	**SR1**	**8**	**(Netherlands) Racing for Holland**	**(Netherlands) Val Hillebrand (Netherlands) Jan Lammers**	**Judd GV4 4.0L V10**	G	**118**
2	SR1	9	(Netherlands) Racing for Holland	(Italy) Beppe Gabbiani (Bolivia) Felipe Ortiz	Dome S101	G	117
2	SR1	9	(Netherlands) Racing for Holland	(Italy) Beppe Gabbiani (Bolivia) Felipe Ortiz	Judd GV4 4.0L V10	G	117
3	SR1	16	(France) Pescarolo Sport	(France) Franck Lagorce (France) Jean-Christophe Boullion	Courage C60 Evo	G	116
3	SR1	16	(France) Pescarolo Sport	(France) Franck Lagorce (France) Jean-Christophe Boullion	Peugeot A32 3.2L Turbo V6	G	116
4	**SR2**	**52**	**(Italy) Lucchini Engineering**	**(Italy) Piergiuseppe Peroni (Italy) Mirko Savoldi**	**Lucchini SR2002**	G	**110**
4	**SR2**	**52**	**(Italy) Lucchini Engineering**	**(Italy) Piergiuseppe Peroni (Italy) Mirko Savoldi**	**Alfa Romeo 3.0L V6**	G	**110**
5	SR2	61	(United Kingdom) Team Jota	(United Kingdom) John Stack (United Kingdom) Sam Hignett	Pilbeam MP84	G	109
5	SR2	61	(United Kingdom) Team Jota	(United Kingdom) John Stack (United Kingdom) Sam Hignett	Nissan (AER) VQL 3.0L V6	G	109
6	SR2	98	(France) PiR Competition	(France) Marc Rostan (France) Pierre Bruneau	Pilbeam MP84	A	105
6	SR2	98	(France) PiR Competition	(France) Marc Rostan (France) Pierre Bruneau	Nissan 3.0L V6	A	105
7	SR2	60	(United Kingdom) Team Sovereign	(United Kingdom) Phillip Armour (United Kingdom) Mike Millard	Rapier 6	D	101
7	SR2	60	(United Kingdom) Team Sovereign	(United Kingdom) Phillip Armour (United Kingdom) Mike Millard	Nissan (AER) VQL 3.0L V6	D	101
8	SR2	70	(France) Debora Automobiles	(France) Gilles Duqueine (France) Dominique Lacaud (France) Didier Miquee	Debora LMP200	D	98
8	SR2	70	(France) Debora Automobiles	(France) Gilles Duqueine (France) Dominique Lacaud (France) Didier Miquee	BMW 3.0L I6	D	98
9	SR2	99	(France) PiR Bruneau	(United Kingdom) Rob Croydon (United Kingdom) Paul Daniels	Debora LMP299	A	96
9	SR2	99	(France) PiR Bruneau	(United Kingdom) Rob Croydon (United Kingdom) Paul Daniels	Nissan (AER) VQL 3.0L V6	A	96
DNF	SR2	72	(Italy) S.C.I.	(Italy) Ranieri Randaccio (Italy) Leonardo Maddalena	Lucchini SR2000	G	96
DNF	SR2	72	(Italy) S.C.I.	(Italy) Ranieri Randaccio (Italy) Leonardo Maddalena	Alfa Romeo 3.0L V6	G	96
DNF	SR2	76	SportsRacing Team Sweden	(Sweden) Niklas Loven (United States) Larry Oberto	Lola B2K/40	A	62
DNF	SR2	76	SportsRacing Team Sweden	(Sweden) Niklas Loven (United States) Larry Oberto	Nissan (AER) VQL 3.0L V6	A	62
DNF	SR2	50	(Italy) Lucchini Engineering	(Italy) Fabio Mancini (Italy) Gianni Collini	Lucchini SR2002	Y	53
DNF	SR2	50	(Italy) Lucchini Engineering	(Italy) Fabio Mancini (Italy) Gianni Collini	Alfa Romeo 3.0L V6	Y	53
DNS	SR1	33	(Germany) Eventus Motorsport	(Germany) Ralph Moog (Switzerland) Georg Paulin	Lola B98/10	A	-
DNS	SR1	33	(Germany) Eventus Motorsport	(Germany) Ralph Moog (Switzerland) Georg Paulin	Ford (Roush) 6.0L V8	A	-

== Statistics ==
- Pole Position - #8 Racing For Holland - 1:10.901
- Fastest Lap - #8 Racing For Holland - 1:11.614
- Distance - 448.400 km
- Average Speed - 179.232 km/h

FIA Sportscar Championship
Previous race: 2002 FIA Sportscar Championship Magny-Cours	2002 season	Next race: 2002 FIA Sportscar Championship Spa
