= 2002 FIA Sportscar Championship Spa =

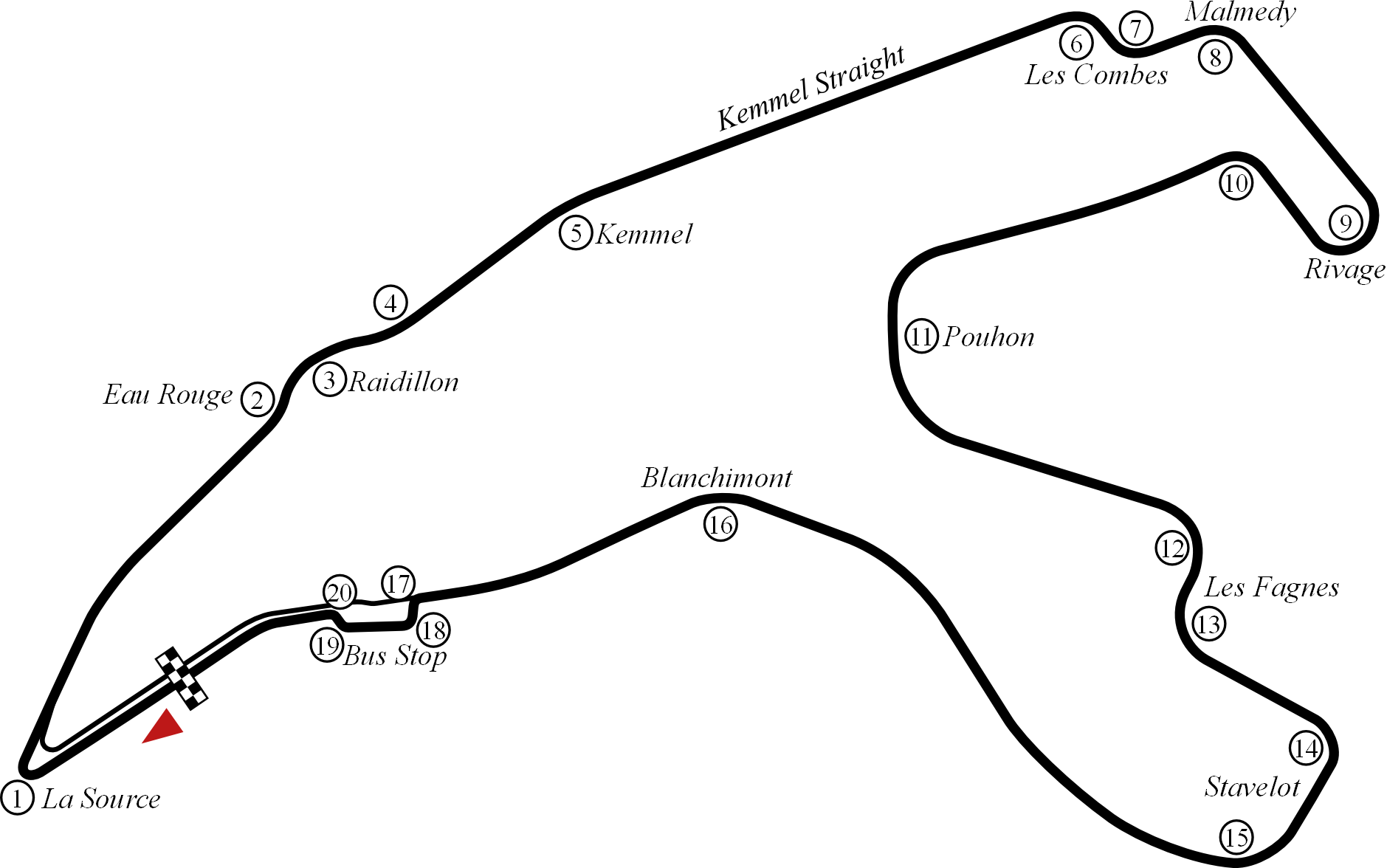
Layout of the Circuit de Spa-Francorchamps (1995–2003)

The 2002 FIA Sportscar Championship Spa was the sixth and final race for the 2002 FIA Sportscar Championship season held at Circuit de Spa-Francorchamps, Belgium. It took place on September 22, 2002.

Although planned to run for two hours and thirty minutes, the race was stopped just shortly after two hours due to torrential downpour.

== Official results ==
Class winners in bold. Cars failing to complete 75% of winner's distance marked as Not Classified (NC).

Pos	Class	No	Team	Drivers	Chassis	Tyre	Laps
Pos	Class	No	Team	Drivers	Engine	Tyre	Laps
1	**SR1**	**16**	**(France) Pescarolo Sport**	**(France) Sébastien Bourdais (France) Jean-Christophe Boullion**	**Courage C60 Evo**	G	**54**
1	**SR1**	**16**	**(France) Pescarolo Sport**	**(France) Sébastien Bourdais (France) Jean-Christophe Boullion**	**Peugeot A32 3.2L Turbo V6**	G	**54**
2	SR1	8	(Netherlands) Racing for Holland	(Netherlands) Val Hillebrand (Netherlands) Jan Lammers	Dome S101	G	54
2	SR1	8	(Netherlands) Racing for Holland	(Netherlands) Val Hillebrand (Netherlands) Jan Lammers	Judd GV4 4.0L V10	G	54
3	SR1	6	(Italy) R & M	(Italy) Vincenzo Sospiri (Italy) Mauro Baldi	R & M SR01	G	54
3	SR1	6	(Italy) R & M	(Italy) Vincenzo Sospiri (Italy) Mauro Baldi	Judd GV4 4.0L V10	G	54
4	SR1	10	(United Kingdom) Bob Berridge Racing	(United Kingdom) Bob Berridge (United Kingdom) Jason Plato	Lola B98/10	D	52
4	SR1	10	(United Kingdom) Bob Berridge Racing	(United Kingdom) Bob Berridge (United Kingdom) Jason Plato	Judd GV4 4.0L V10	D	52
5	SR1	21	(Italy) Durango Corse	(Italy) Gianmaria Bruni (Italy) Alessandro Battaglin	GMS Durango LMP1	G	51
5	SR1	21	(Italy) Durango Corse	(Italy) Gianmaria Bruni (Italy) Alessandro Battaglin	Judd GV4 4.0L V10	G	51
6	**SR2**	**50**	**(Italy) Lucchini Engineering**	**(Italy) Fabio Mancini (Italy) Gianni Collini**	**Lucchini SR2002**	Y	**51**
6	**SR2**	**50**	**(Italy) Lucchini Engineering**	**(Italy) Fabio Mancini (Italy) Gianni Collini**	**Alfa Romeo 3.0L V6**	Y	**51**
7	SR2	52	(Italy) Lucchini Engineering	(Italy) Piergiuseppe Peroni (Italy) Mirko Savoldi	Lucchini SR2002	G	51
7	SR2	52	(Italy) Lucchini Engineering	(Italy) Piergiuseppe Peroni (Italy) Mirko Savoldi	Alfa Romeo 3.0L V6	G	51
8	SR2	76	SportsRacing Team Sweden	(Sweden) Niklas Loven (Sweden) Thed Björk	Lola B2K/40	A	50
8	SR2	76	SportsRacing Team Sweden	(Sweden) Niklas Loven (Sweden) Thed Björk	Nissan (AER) VQL 3.0L V6	A	50
9	SR2	70	(France) Debora Automobiles	(France) Xavier Bich (Switzerland) Roland Bossy	Debora LMP200	D	46
9	SR2	70	(France) Debora Automobiles	(France) Xavier Bich (Switzerland) Roland Bossy	BMW 3.0L I6	D	46
10	SR2	72	(Italy) S.C.I.	(Italy) Ranieri Randaccio (Italy) Leonardo Maddalena	Lucchini SR2000	G	46
10	SR2	72	(Italy) S.C.I.	(Italy) Ranieri Randaccio (Italy) Leonardo Maddalena	Alfa Romeo 3.0L V6	G	46
11	SR2	83	(United Kingdom) JCI Developments	(United Kingdom) Rob Croydon (United Kingdom) Michael Mallock	Tampolli RTA-2001	D	46
11	SR2	83	(United Kingdom) JCI Developments	(United Kingdom) Rob Croydon (United Kingdom) Michael Mallock	Opel 3.0L V6	D	46
12	SR1	9	(Netherlands) Racing for Holland	(Italy) Beppe Gabbiani (Bolivia) Felipe Ortiz	Dome S101	G	42
12	SR1	9	(Netherlands) Racing for Holland	(Italy) Beppe Gabbiani (Bolivia) Felipe Ortiz	Judd GV4 4.0L V10	G	42
13	SR1	19	(United Kingdom) Simpson Engineering	(United Kingdom) Richard Jones (United Kingdom) Robin Smith (Belgium) Bernard de Dryver	Riley & Scott Mk III	D	39
13	SR1	19	(United Kingdom) Simpson Engineering	(United Kingdom) Richard Jones (United Kingdom) Robin Smith (Belgium) Bernard de Dryver	Chevrolet 5.1L V8	D	39
DNF	SR2	61	(United Kingdom) Team Jota	(United Kingdom) John Stack (United Kingdom) Sam Hignett	Pilbeam MP84	G	27
DNF	SR2	61	(United Kingdom) Team Jota	(United Kingdom) John Stack (United Kingdom) Sam Hignett	Nissan (AER) VQL 3.0L V6	G	27
DNF	SR2	99	(France) PiR Bruneau	(Belgium) Frédéric Bouvy (Belgium) Christophe Geoffroy (Belgium) David Sterckx	Debora LMP299	A	22
DNF	SR2	99	(France) PiR Bruneau	(Belgium) Frédéric Bouvy (Belgium) Christophe Geoffroy (Belgium) David Sterckx	Nissan (AER) VQL 3.0L V6	A	22
DNF	SR2	98	(France) PiR Competition	(United Kingdom) Paul Daniels (France) Pierre Bruneau	Pilbeam MP84	A	19
DNF	SR2	98	(France) PiR Competition	(United Kingdom) Paul Daniels (France) Pierre Bruneau	Nissan (AER) VQL 3.0L V6	A	19
DNF	SR2	60	(United Kingdom) Team Sovereign	(United Kingdom) Phillip Armour (United Kingdom) Mike Mallard	Rapier 6	D	11
DNF	SR2	60	(United Kingdom) Team Sovereign	(United Kingdom) Phillip Armour (United Kingdom) Mike Mallard	Nissan (AER) VQL 3.0L V6	D	11

== Statistics ==
- Pole Position - #8 Racing For Holland - 2:07.704
- Fastest Lap - #8 Racing For Holland - 2:08.909
- Distance - 376.272 km
- Average Speed - 183.148 km/h

FIA Sportscar Championship
Previous race: 2002 FIA Sportscar Championship Dijon	2002 season	Next race: None
