= Franck Lagorce =

French racing driver (born 1968)

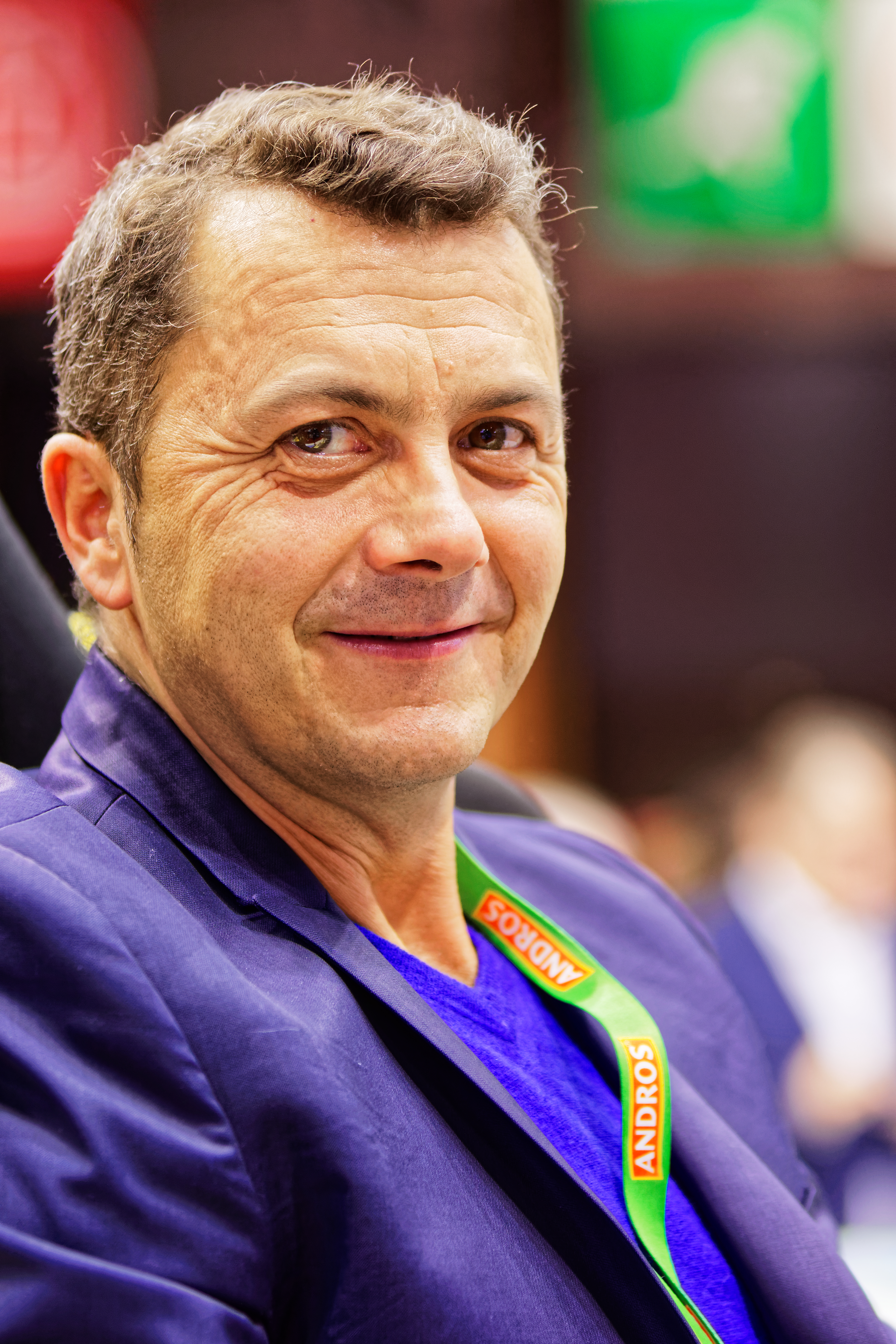
- Lagorce in 2016
- Born: 1 September 1968 (age 58); L'Haÿ-les-Roses, France

Formula One World Championship career
- Nationality: (France) French
- Active years: 1994
- Team: Ligier
- Entries: 2
- Championships: 0
- Wins: 0
- Podiums: 0
- Career points: 0
- Pole positions: 0
- Fastest laps: 0
- First entry: 1994 Japanese Grand Prix
- Last entry: 1994 Australian Grand Prix

Championship titles
- 1996 1992: Renault Spider Trophy; French Formula Three Championship

Franck Lagorce (born 1 September 1968) is a racing driver from France. He participated in two Formula One Grands Prix, debuting on 6 November 1994. He scored no championship points.

== Career ==
Lagorce competed in French Formula Ford between 1987 and 1989, and was runner up in the French Formula Renault Championship in 1990. He stepped up to the French Formula Three Championship in 1991 and won the title the following year. He competed in Formula 3000 for the next two years, winning four races and finishing the 1994 season in second place. He was Ligier's test driver in 1994 and 1995 and drove in the last two races of the 1994 Formula One season when Johnny Herbert moved to Benetton to replace JJ Lehto who had been loaned to Sauber. He then became test driver for Forti Corse in 1996.

Lagorce won the Renault Spider trophy in 1996, and has since competed in production car and sportscar racing.

== Racing record ==
=== Complete International Formula 3000 results ===
(key) (Races in bold indicate pole position) (Races in italics indicate fastest lap)

Year	Entrant	Chassis	Engine	1	2	3	4	5	6	7	8	9	DC	Points
1993	DAMS	Reynard/93D	Ford Cosworth	DON; 8	SIL; 4	PAU; 7	PER; 11	HOC; DNS	NÜR; 11	SPA; 10	MAG; 1	**NOG**; 1	4th	21
1994	Apomatox	Reynard/94D	Ford Cosworth	**SIL**; 1	PAU; 5	CAT; 5	**PER**; 2	HOC; 1	**SPA**; 13	EST; 8	**MAG**; 2		**2nd**	**34**

=== Complete Formula One results ===
(key)

Year	Entrant	Chassis	Engine	1	2	3	4	5	6	7	8	9	10	11	12	13	14	15	16	WDC	Points
1994	Ligier Gitanes Blondes	Ligier JS39B	Renault V10	BRA	PAC	SMR	MON	ESP	CAN	FRA	GBR	GER	HUN	BEL	ITA	POR	EUR	JPN; Ret	AUS; 11	NC	0

=== 24 Hours of Le Mans results ===
Year	Team	Co-Drivers	Car	Class	Laps	Pos.	Class Pos.
1994	(France) Courage Compétition	(France) Henri Pescarolo (France) Alain Ferté	Courage C32LM-Porsche	LMP1; C90	142	DNF	DNF
1995	(France) Courage Compétition	(France) Henri Pescarolo (France) Éric Bernard	Courage C41-Chevrolet	WSC	26	DNF	DNF
1996	(France) La Filière Elf	(France) Henri Pescarolo (France) Emmanuel Collard	Courage C36-Porsche	LMP1	327	7th	**2nd**
1997	(France) DAMS	(France) Éric Bernard (France) Jean-Christophe Boullion	Panoz Esperante GTR-1	GT1	149	DNF	DNF
1998	(Japan) Nissan Motorsports (United Kingdom) TWR	(Denmark) John Nielsen (Germany) Michael Krumm	Nissan R390 GT1	GT1	342	5th	5th
1999	(Germany) AMG-Mercedes	(Germany) Bernd Schneider (Portugal) Pedro Lamy	Mercedes-Benz CLR	LMGTP	76	DNF	DNF
2000	(United States) Team Cadillac	(United States) Butch Leitzinger (United Kingdom) Andy Wallace	Cadillac Northstar LMP	LMP900	291	21st	11th
2001	(United States) Panoz Motorsports	(Australia) David Brabham (Denmark) Jan Magnussen	Panoz LMP07-Élan	LMP900	85	DNF	DNF
2002	(France) Pescarolo Sport	(France) Sébastien Bourdais (France) Jean-Christophe Boullion	Courage C60-Peugeot	LMP900	343	10th	9th
2003	(France) Pescarolo Sport	(France) Stéphane Sarrazin (France) Jean-Christophe Boullion	Courage C60-Peugeot	LMP900	356	8th	6th

Sporting positions
Preceded by Christophe Bouchut	French Formula Three Champion; 1992	Succeeded by Didier Cottaz
Preceded by Marcel Kläy	Renault Sport Spider Elf Trophy Champion; 1996	Succeeded by Tommy Rustad
