= Robin Smith (racing driver) =

British racing driver (1943–2019)

Robin Smith (17 July 1943 – 9 February 2019) was a British racing driver.

Smith competed in the British Formula One Championship in 1979 and 1980. He died on 9 February 2019, at the age of 75.
