= Boris Derichebourg =

French racecar driver (born 1978)

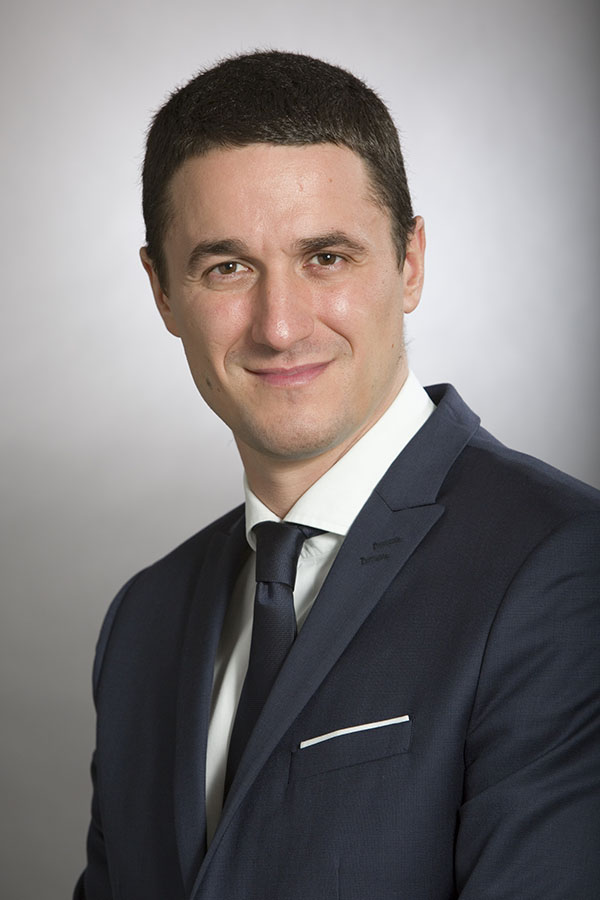
- Nationality: French
- Born: Boris Patrice Daniel Derichebourg; 16 March 1978 (age 48) Enghien-les-Bains, France
24 Hours of Le Mans career
- Years: 2000–2002
- Teams: Paul Belmondo Racing, Pescarolo Sport, Courage Compétition
- Best finish: 15th (2002)

Boris Patrice Daniel Derichebourg (born 16 March 1978 in Enghien-les-Bains) is a French businessman and former racing driver. Derichebourg began his racing career in karts in 1992 before moving to the French Formula Three Championship in 1995 and 1996. He moved up to International Formula 3000 in 1997, earning two podiums in two seasons. In 1999, he ran two Indy Lights races and two Formula 3000 races.

In 2000, Derichebourg raced for Paul Belmondo Racing in the FIA GT Championship, and at Le Mans. For the 2001 season, he continued with Belmondo in FIA GT, and raced a prototype for Pescarolo Sport at the 24 Hours of Le Mans and the 1000 kilometers of Estoril. In 2002, Derichebourg raced sparingly in the FIA GT Championship for Belmondo and the FIA Sportscar Championship for Courage Compétition. He also ran the 24 Hours of Le Mans for Courage, finishing 15th overall and 11th in class.

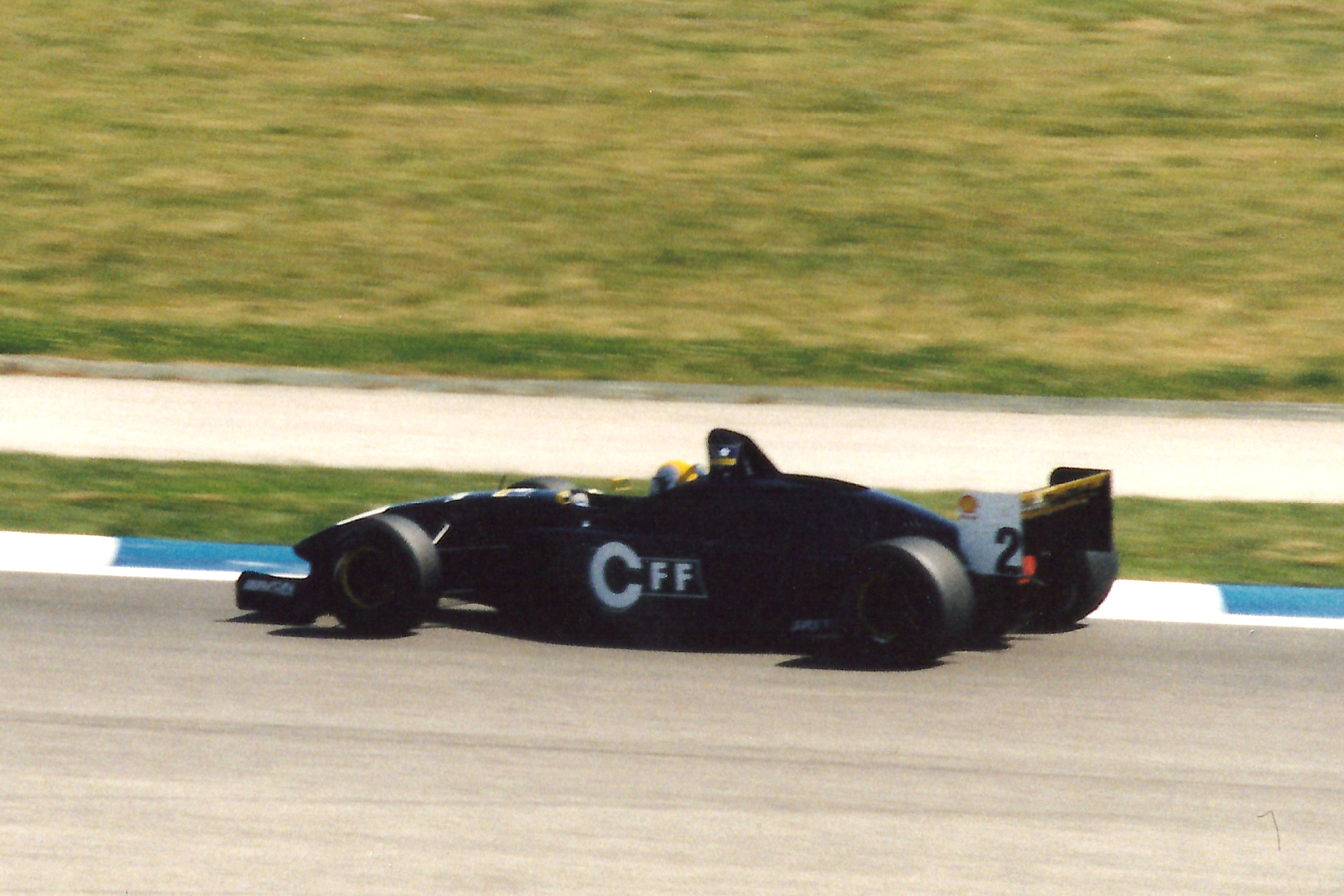
Boris Derichebourg driving in the F3000 race for Super Nova Racing at the Circuit de Catalunya in 1998.

Derichebourg moved to the French GT Championship in 2003, again driving Paul Belmondo Racing's Chrysler Viper. After two starts in the World Series by Nissan in 2004, he retired from auto racing. Derichebourg is currently an executive at several of his family's companies.

== Racing results ==
=== American open-wheel racing results ===
(key) (Races in bold indicate pole position) (Races in italics indicate fastest lap) (Small number denotes finishing position)

==== Indy Lights ====
Year	Team	1	2	3	4	5	6	7	8	9	10	11	12	Rank	Points	Ref
1999	PacWest Lights	MIA	LBH	NAZ	MIL	POR	CLE	TOR	MIS	DET; 16	CHI; DNS	LAG; 9	FON	**21st**	**4**	

=== 24 Hours of Le Mans results ===
Year	Team	Co-Drivers	Car	Class	Laps	Pos.	Class Pos.
2000	(France) Paul Belmondo Racing	(France) Guy Martinolle (France) Jean-Claude Lagniez	Chrysler Viper GTS-R	GTS	180	DNF	DNF
2001	(France) Pescarolo Sport	(France) Emmanuel Clérico (France) Didier Cottaz	Courage C60-Peugeot	LMP900	42	DNF	DNF
2002	(France) Courage Compétition	(France) Didier Cottaz (Sweden) Thed Björk	Courage C60-Judd	LMP900	322	15th	11th
