= Pilbeam MP84 =

Sports prototype race car

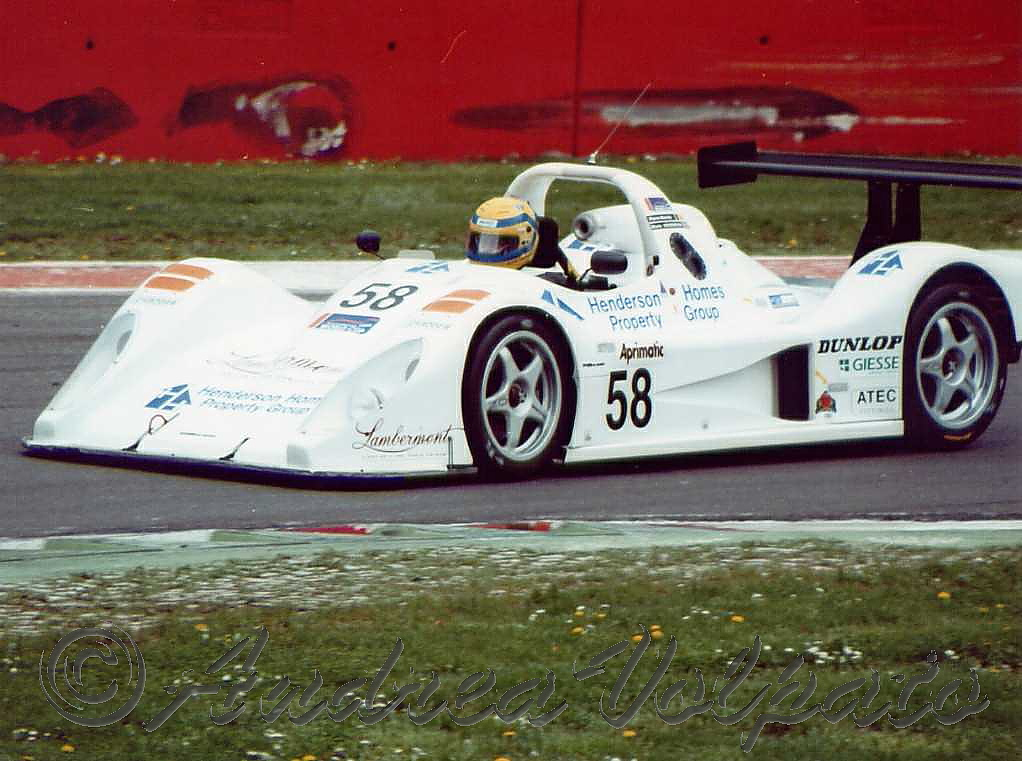
- Category: LMP675/SR2
- Designer(s): Mike Pilbeam
- Successor: Pilbeam MP91

Technical specifications
- Chassis: Carbon fiber and aluminum honeycomb monocoque chassis
- Suspension: Unequal length wishbones, pushrod actuated coil springs over shock absorbers, inboard rocker arms
- Length: 4,455 mm (175.4 in)
- Width: 1,900 mm (75 in)
- Axle track: 1,500 mm (59 in) (front); 1,600 mm (63 in) (rear)
- Wheelbase: 2,550 mm (100 in)
- Engine: Peugeot/Sodemo or AER P14 (Nissan VQ) 3.0–3.4 L (183.1–207.5 cu in) 60° DOHC V6, naturally-aspirated, mid-engined
- Transmission: Hewland NMT 6-speed sequential
- Power: 350–385 hp (261–287 kW)
- Weight: 675 kg (1,488 lb)

Competition history
- Debut: 1999 SportsRacing World Cup Barcelona

The Pilbeam MP84 is a sports prototype race car, designed, developed and built by British manufacturer Pilbeam, for sports car racing, conforming to the FIA's LMP675/SR2 class, and produced between 1999 and 2005.
