= Didier Cottaz =

French racing driver

Didier Jean Cottaz (born 23 May 1967) is a French former racing driver.

== Racing record ==
=== Complete International Formula 3000 results ===
(key) (Races in bold indicate pole position) (Races in italics indicate fastest lap)

Year	Entrant	Chassis	Engine	1	2	3	4	5	6	7	8	DC	Points
1994	Paul Stewart Racing	Reynard 94D	Zytek Judd	SIL; 6	PAU; 3	CAT; 7	PER; 9	HOC; 11	SPA; 2	EST; 5	MAG; 7	5th	13
1995	Paul Stewart Racing	Reynard 95D	Ford Cosworth	SIL; Ret	CAT; Ret	PAU; 6	PER; Ret	HOC; 11	SPA; 11	EST; Ret	MAG; 11	17th	1

=== 24 Hours of Le Mans results ===
Year	Team	Co-Drivers	Car	Class	Laps	Pos.	Class Pos.
1996	(France) Courage Compétition	(France) Jérôme Policand (France) Philippe Alliot	Courage C36-Porsche	LMP1	215	DNF	DNF
1997	(France) Courage Compétition	(France) Jérôme Policand (Belgium) Marc Goossens	Courage C41-Porsche	LMP1	336	4th	**2nd**
1998	(France) Courage Compétition	(Belgium) Marc Goossens (France) Jean-Philippe Belloc	Courage C51-Nissan	LMP1	232	DNF	DNF
1999	(Japan) Nissan Motorsports	(Belgium) Marc Goossens (Sweden) Fredrik Ekblom	Courage C52-Nissan	LMP	335	8th	7th
2000	(France) SMG Compétition	(France) Philippe Gache (South Africa) Gary Formato	Courage C60-Judd	LMP900	219	DNF	DNF
2001	(France) Pescarolo Sport	(France) Emmanuel Clérico (France) Boris Derichebourg	Courage C60-Peugeot	LMP900	42	DNF	DNF
2002	(France) Courage Compétition	(France) Boris Derichebourg (Sweden) Thed Björk	Courage C60-Judd	LMP900	322	15th	11th

Sporting positions
Preceded by Franck Lagorce	French Formula Three Champion; 1993	Succeeded by Jean-Philippe Belloc
