= Lola B98/10 =

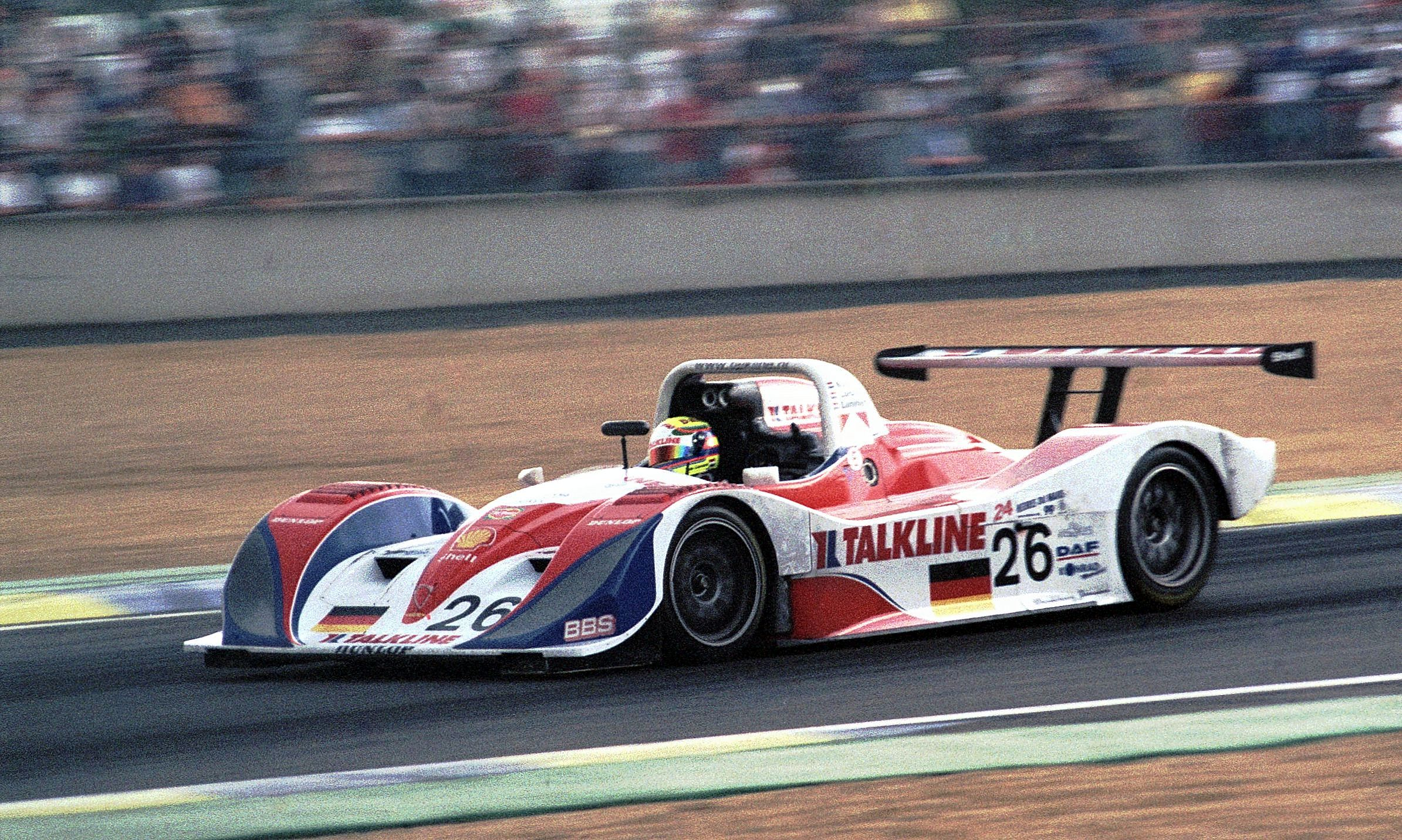
Lola B98/10 of Peter Kox, Jan Lammers and Tom Coronel exits Dunlop Chicane at the 1999 24 Hours of Le Mans.

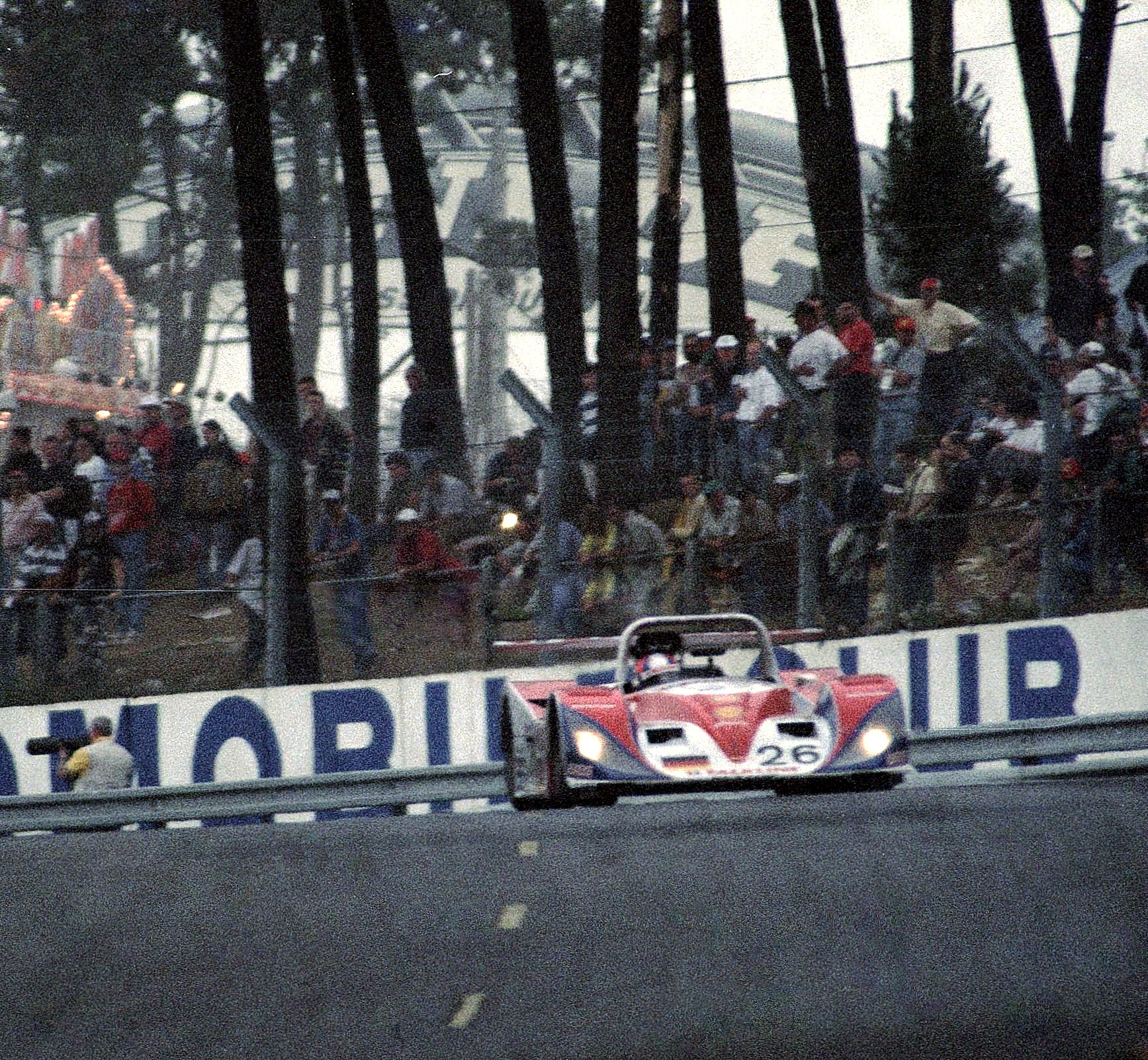
Lola B98/10 of Lola Peter Kox, Jan Lammers and Tom Coronel exits the Esses at the 1999 24 Hours of Le Mans.

The Lola B98/10 was a Le Mans Prototype built by Lola Cars International for use in the International Sports Racing Series, American Le Mans Series, and 24 Hours of Le Mans. It would be the first international sports car built by Lola since they briefly left the sport in 1992 following the Lola T92/10. It would be succeeded in 2000 by the Lola B2K/10.

== Development ==
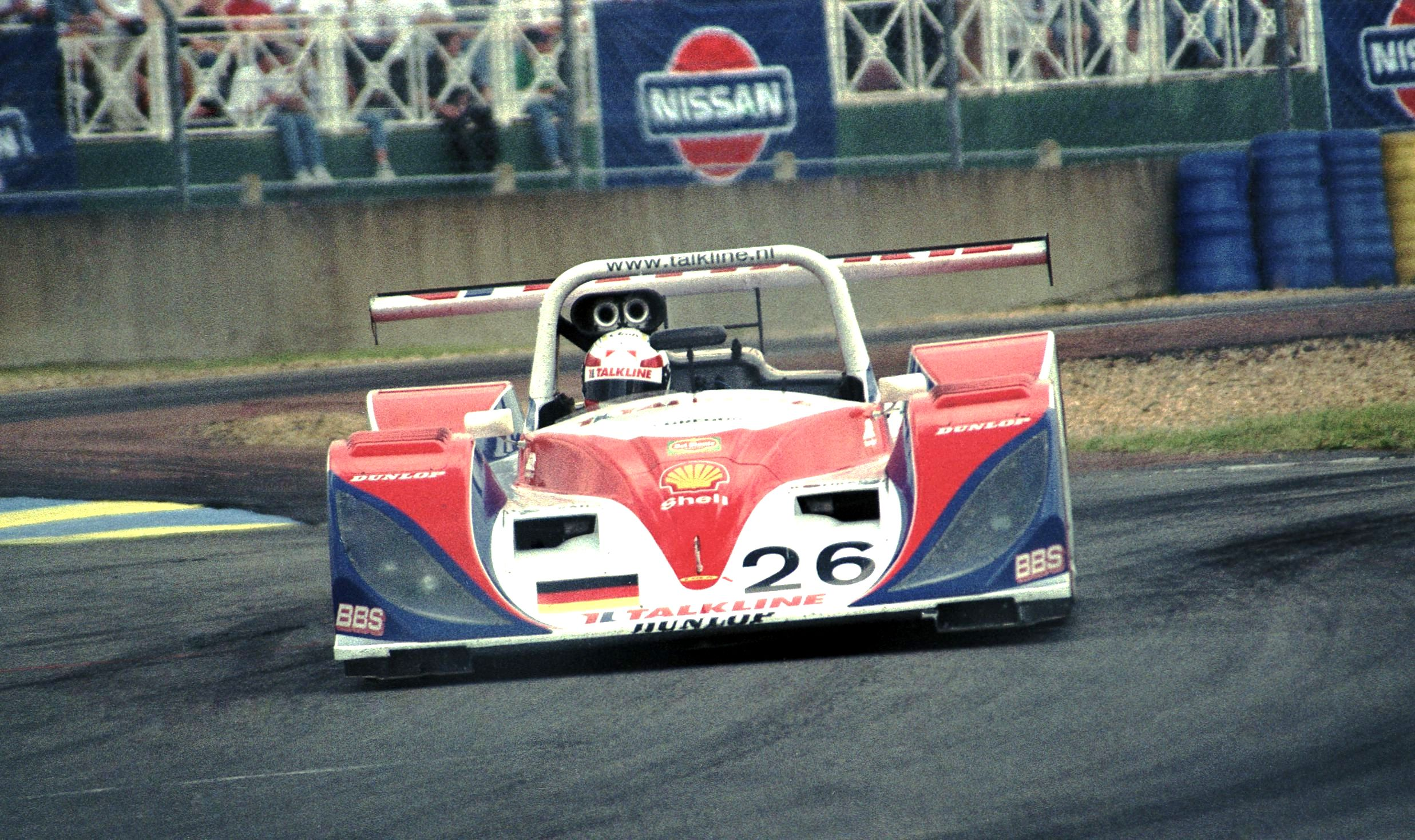
Lola B98/10 of Peter Kox, Jan Lammers & Tom Coronel at Ford Chicane at the 1999 24 Hours of Le Mans.

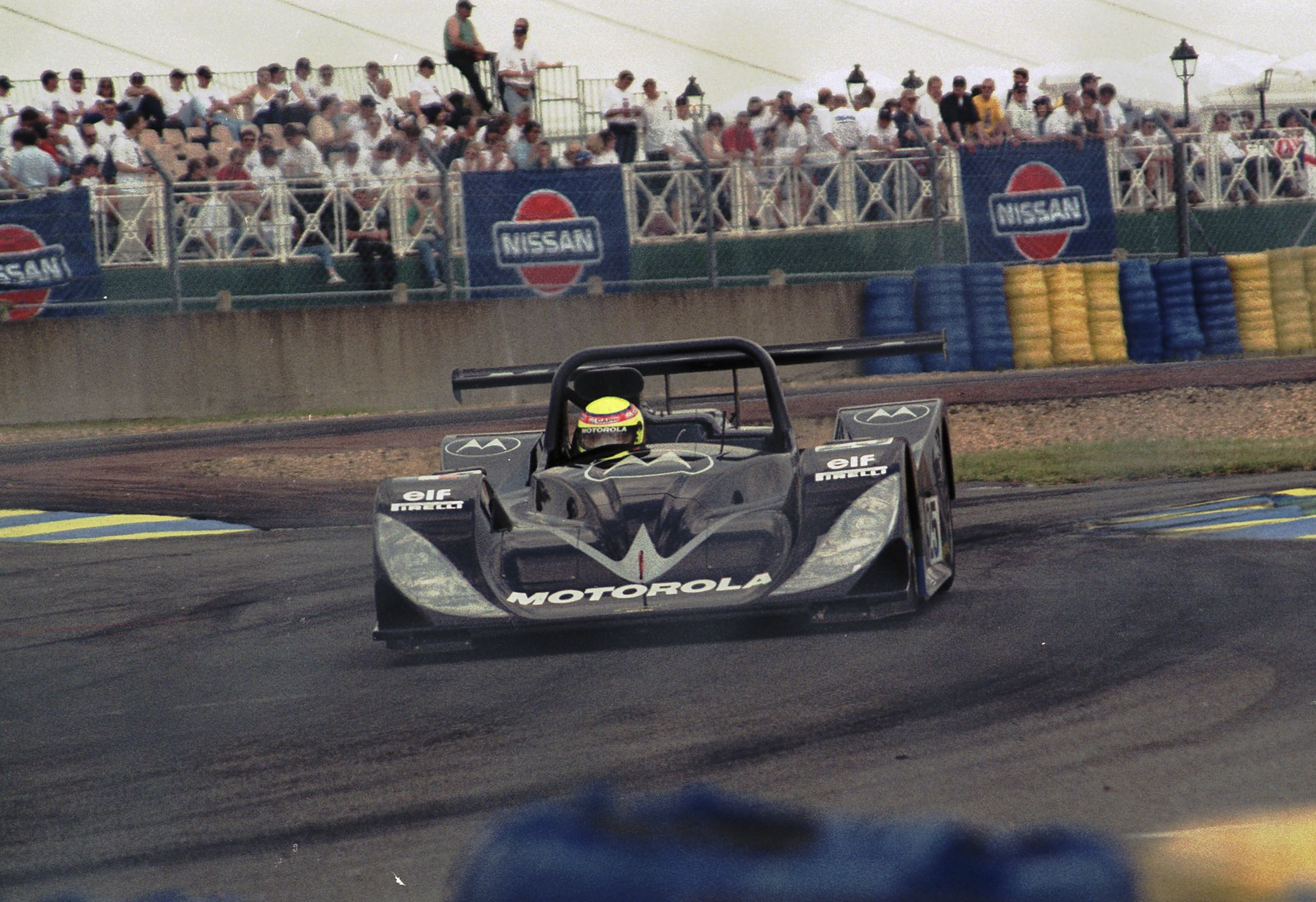
Lola B98/10 of Christophe Tinseau, David Terrien & Franck Montagny at Ford Chicane at the 1999 24 Hours of Le Mans.

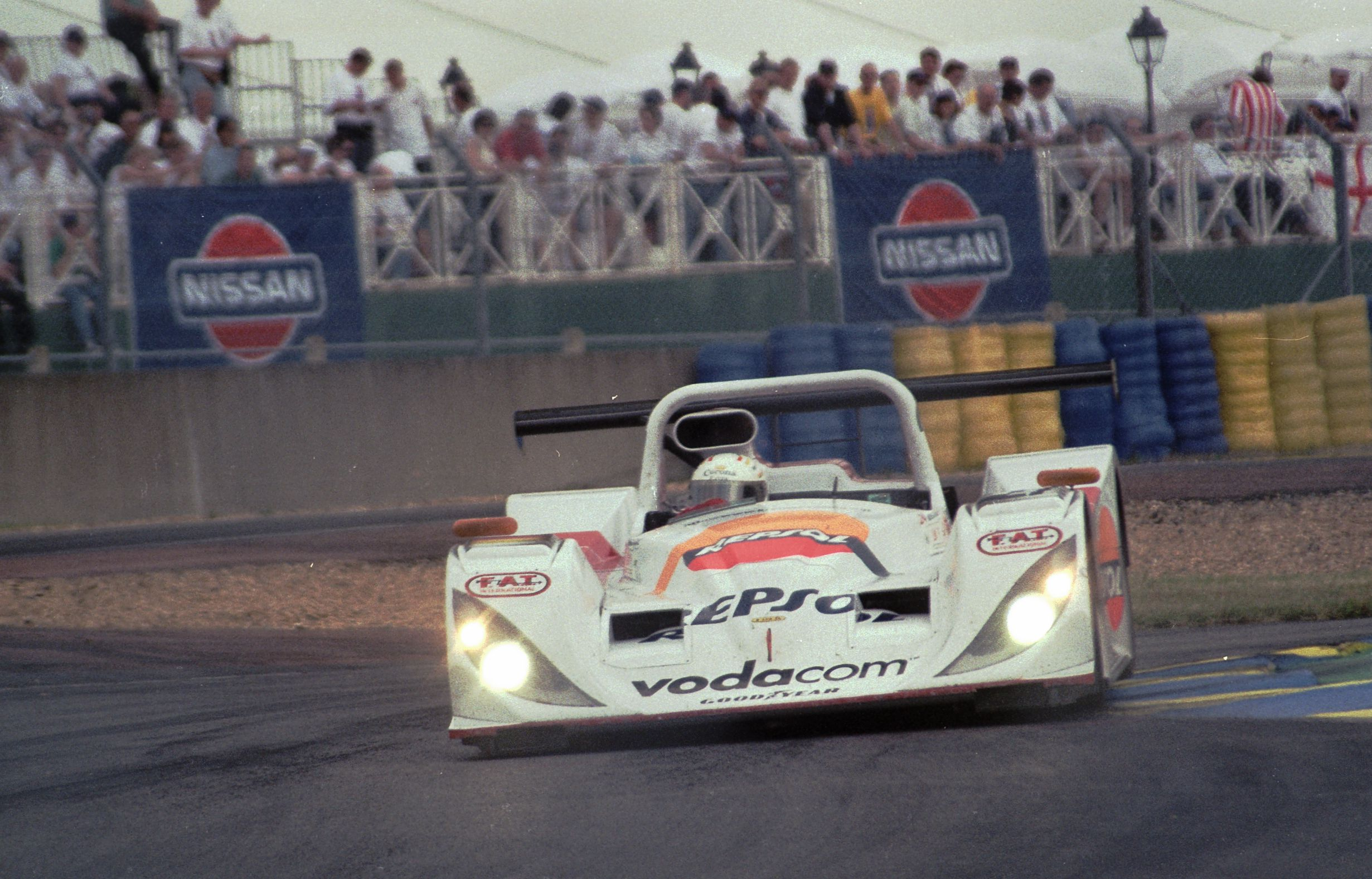
Lola B98/10 of Didier de Radigues, Tomás Saldaña & Grant Orbelli at Ford Chicane at the 1999 24 Hours of Le Mans.

Intended as a cheap yet capable prototype, the B98/10 would not have the input of a major manufacturer to back it, so the car was intended from the start to be offered to privateers and to fulfill a variety of roles in various series. While various elements of the design were similar to other prototypes of the time, multiple unique elements were included. Most noticeable was the front end of the car, which featured blunt fenders with headlights mounted on the side due to the extreme curving angle of the fenders. This also allowed for a large splitter to be used across the entire nose. The air intakes for the engines were also unique in that they were placed underneath the rollbar in a fashion similar to an open-wheel race car.

For engines, a wide variety were available to customer teams, but the cars were designed around the use of a Roush-designed Ford 6.0 Litre V8. Many B98/10 chassis used this engine, although others opted for other choices such as a turbocharged Ford V6, a Lotus V8, a Chevrolet V8, a BMW Inline-6, and even a Judd V10. All these engines were able to fit in the small B98/10 chassis, although minor modifications were needed for some engines, such as the turbocharged Ford, needing intakes for the turbo incorporated into the bodywork.

A total of eight B98/10s would be built.

== Racing history ==
Although intended for competition in 1998, the first B98/10 chassis would not be completed until fall of that year when it was tested by Dyson Racing after the inaugural Petit Le Mans meaning the cars were forced to make their debut in 1999. Intersport Racing and Konrad Motorsport were the first customers, with Konrad opting to use a Lotus engine in place of the Ford. Both cars would debut at the 24 Hours of Daytona in the Can-Am class for the United States Road Racing Championship, with both cars failing to finish due to mechanical problems. The two teams would then move to the American Le Mans Series opening round, the 12 Hours of Sebring. Joined by a third B98/10 customer, Team Cascadia running a BMW engine, the B98/10s would improve with Intersport taking a 19th-place finish. The B98/10 field would be further boosted by the additions of Multimatic Motorsports and the Whittington Brothers, while Team Cascadia would improve to a more powerful Chevrolet V8.

Meanwhile, Europe would see the debut of two more B98/10s for the International Sports Racing Series, in the hands of DAMS and Kremer Racing, with DAMS running a Judd GV4 V10. While the American B98/10s struggled against factory teams from Audi, BMW, and Panoz, the European squads saw more success. DAMS would be successful in taking four wins over the season, earning them third in the teams championship. DAMS and Kremer would also be joined by Konrad Motorsport, now using the standard Ford V8 in place of their Lotus V8, for the 1999 24 Hours of Le Mans. Unfortunately none of the cars would finish.

For 2000, the B98/10 would be effectively replaced by the B2K/10, which improved on the B98/10s basic design. However B98/10s would continue in competition. Kremer Racing upgraded their car, terming it the B98/K2000, and were able to take a single win the last race of the Sports Racing World Cup. In North America, Intersport Racing and Multimatic Motorsports would run select races in the Grand American Road Racing Championship and American Le Mans Series. Konrad Motorsport on the other hand would run select races on both continents.

In 2001, the only B98/10 still in competition was the car of Kremer Racing, now further upgraded by the team. Running the newly named FIA Sportscar Championship, the B98/10 showed its age by managing points in only two rounds. However 2002 would see a resurrection for the B98/10, when two chassis were purchased for competition. Eventus Motorsport of Germany would run selection FIA Sportscar Championship races, while Bob Berridge Racing had larger plans. Besides running the full FIA Sportscar Championship schedule, Bob Berridge Racing, with the assistance of DAMS, were granted special permission to enter the 24 Hours of Le Mans for the creation of a film about the comic book character Michel Vaillant, with the B98/10 representing the Vaillante, the hero's car. The car would carry film equipment for the bulk of the race making it uncompetitive, yet was necessary to allow for realistic racing scenes. A Panoz LMP-1 Roadster-S was entered in a similar fashion to portray the Leader, the enemy's car.

The B98/10 would make one final appearance at the 2003 FIA Sportscar Championship Donington round before retiring from competition.
