= Lucchini Engineering =

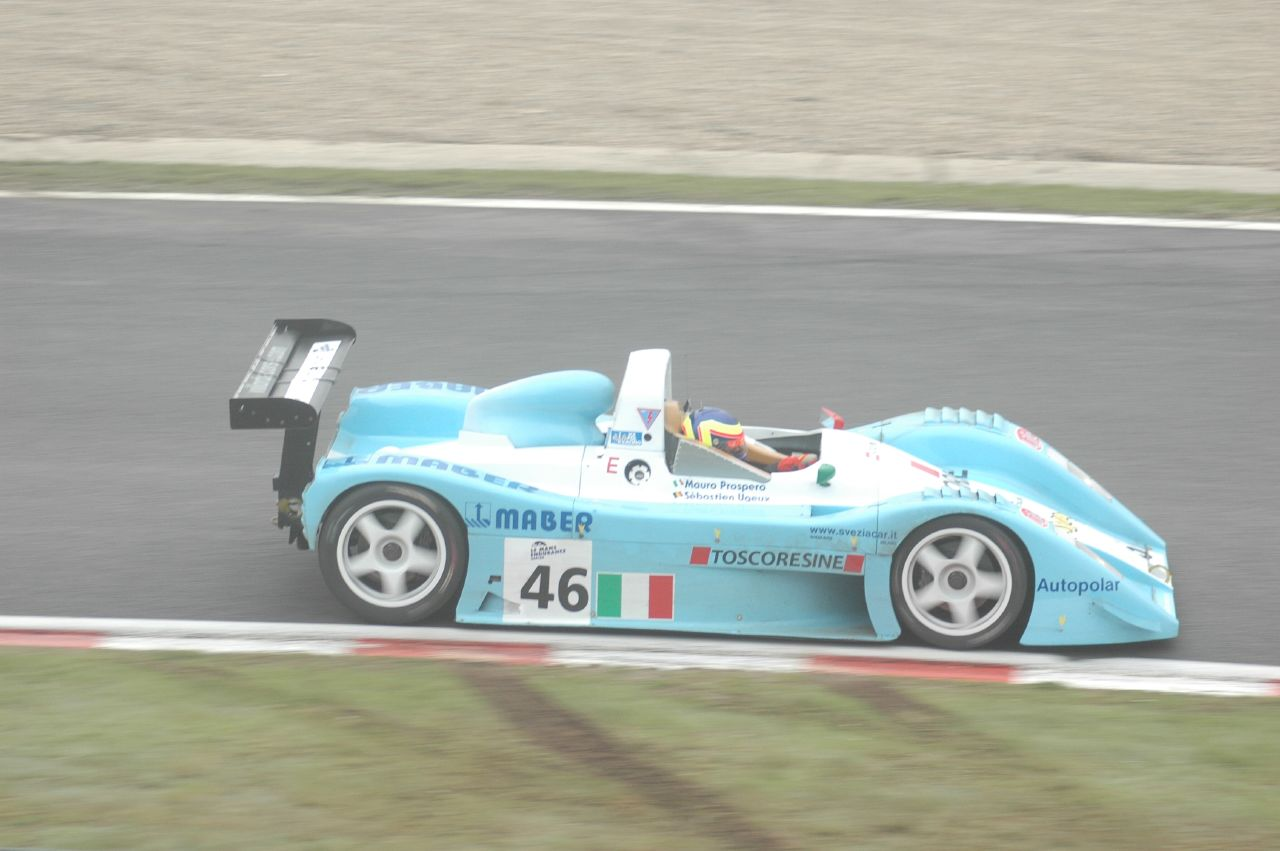
A Lucchini SR2 at the 2005 1000km of Spa.

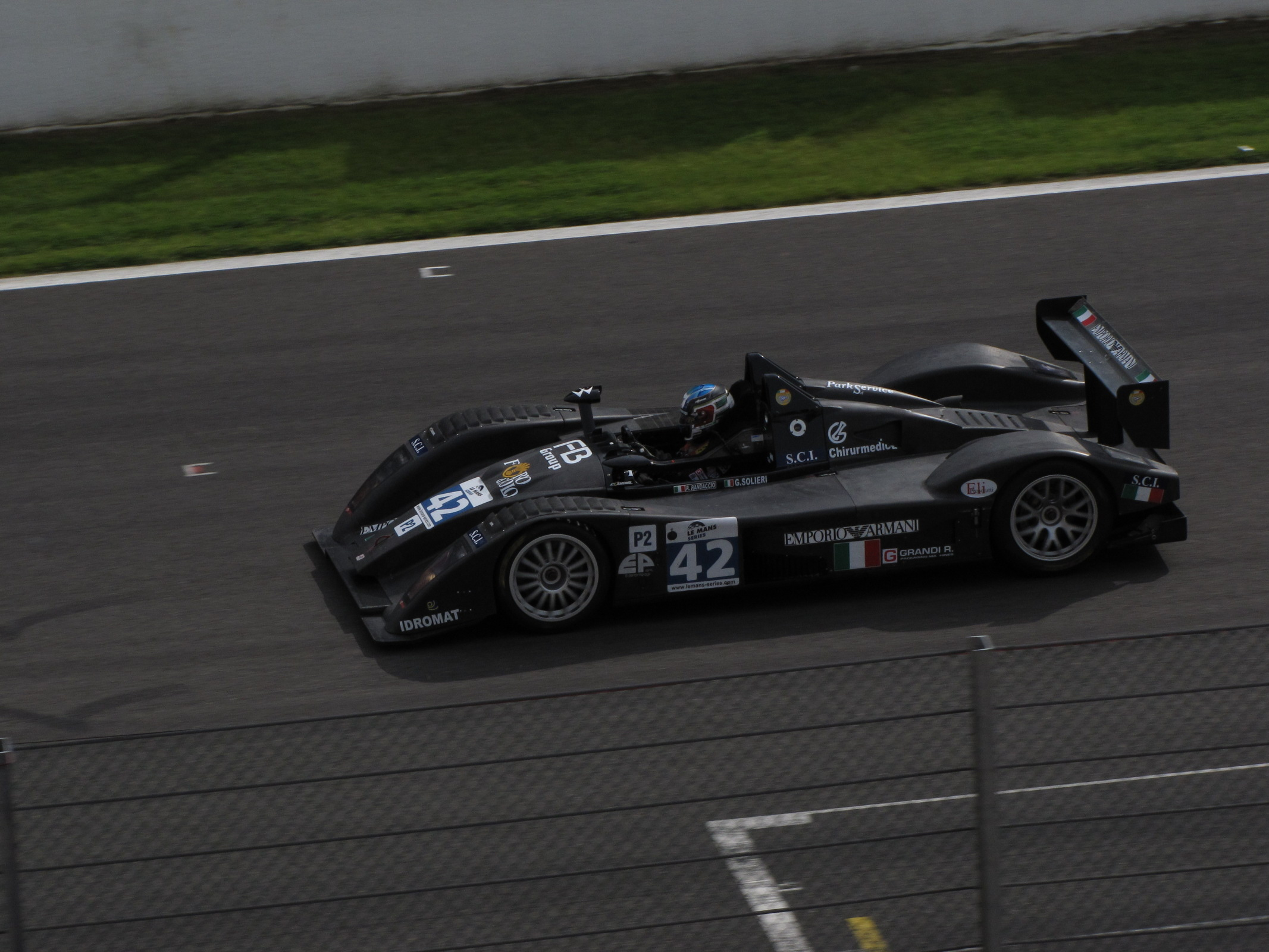
Lucchini LMP2/08 at the 2009 Spa-Francorchamps 1000km race.

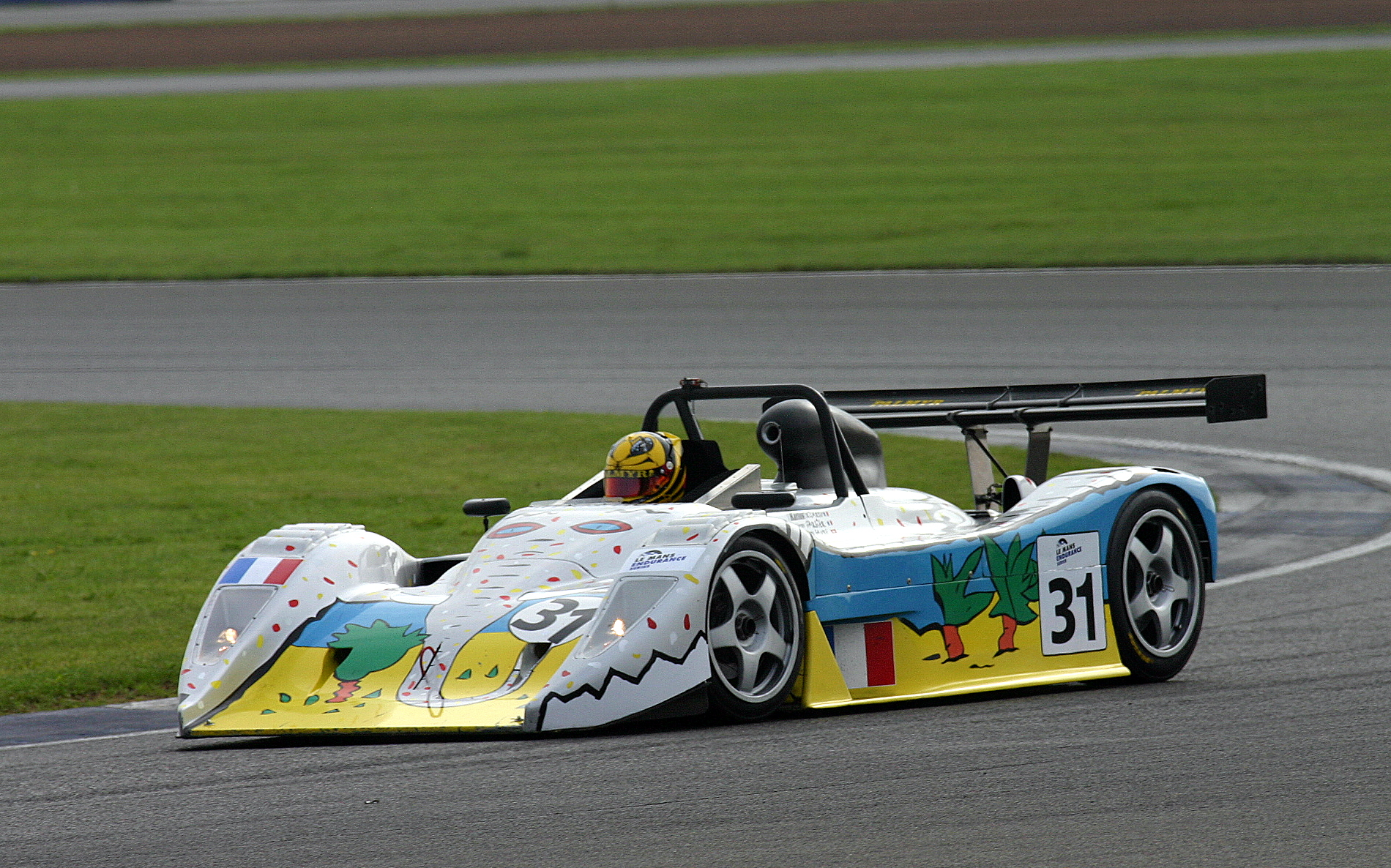
Lucchini SR2000 - Philippe Favre, Christophe Ricard & Gregory Fargier at Luffield at the 2004 Silverstone 1000 km.

Lucchini Engineering is an Italian sports car constructor and racing team. Founded by Giorgio Lucchini in Porto Mantovano in 1980, the company has built a wide variety of open-cockpit prototypes for use in hillclimbs as well as Le Mans Prototypes for endurance racing. Besides racing their own cars, their chassis have been sold to various privateer teams over the years.

Lucchini has had some success over the years, including winning the FIA Sportscar Championship's team and constructor championships in the SR2-class two years in a row (2002 and 2003). They have also won various European, Italian, and French hillclimb championships.

Currently Lucchini sells the CN4 hillclimb car and the LMP2/08 LMP2-class prototype which runs in the Le Mans Series.

== History ==
The motorsport company was founded by Giorgio Lucchini in Porto Mantovano in 1980 and manufactures a large number of open sports car prototypes for use in hill climbs in the CN group and in the Le Mans prototype series for long-distance races. The various vehicles were powered by Alfa Romeo, BMW, Ford, Opel, Judd and Nissan engines.

Lucchini has had a number of successes over the years, including winning the FIA Sportscar Championship Team and Constructors Championship in the SR2 class in 2002 and 2003. Lucchini's cars have also won various European hillclimb championships, such as Switzerland's Philippe Darbellay taking part in 1991 a Lucchini S289. In 2006 Filippo Francioni won the Italian prototype championships with a Lucchini Alfa Romeo 12V. Giampiero Consonni drove Lucchini sports prototypes at the Italian Championships in the 1990s and also won a few races.

From 2008 onwards, LMP2 prototypes were made with Judd engines, which were used in the Le Mans Series. Drivers were the Italian pilots Marco Didaio, Filippo Francioni and Mirco Savoldi.

Although there are still numerous Lucchini racing cars around the world, the whereabouts of the sports car manufacturer is unclear, production was probably stopped in 2009. Numerous Lucchini vehicles can still be found at historic motorsport races. A well-known vehicle from 1986 (series SN86) is owned by German racing driver Helmut Bross.

== Models produced ==
List:

- S282-008, Alfa Romeo 2.5, 1982
- SN86-33, Alfa Romeo 2.5, 1986
- SP288-050, BMW, 1988
- S289/055, Alfa Romeo, 1989
- SP390/072, custom made, 1990
- SP390/073, Alfa Romeo 3.0 24V, 1990
- SP90/077, Alfa Romeo, 1990
- SP91/084, Alfa Romeo 3.0 12V, 1991
- SP91/085, custom made, 1991
- P3-94/102, Alfa Romeo 3.0 24V, 1994
- P3-94/105, BMW, 1994
- P3-95/111, BMW, 1995
- P3-95/115, Alfa Romeo, 1995
- P3-96/116, Alfa Romeo, 1996
- P3-96/124, BMW, 1996
- P1-97/130, BMW, 1997
- P1-98/132, BMW, 1998
- P1-98/133, Alfa Romeo, 1998
- P1-98/136, BMW, 1998
- SR1-98/138, Ford, 1999
- SR2-99/139, Alfa Romeo 3.0 12V, 1999
- SR2-99/140, Alfa Romeo, 1999
- SR2000/141, Alfa Romeo, 2000
- SR2000/142, Alfa Romeo, 2000
- SR2001/143, Alfa Romeo, 2001
- SR2001/144, Alfa Romeo, 2001
- SR2001/145, Alfa Romeo, 2001
- SR2001/146, Alfa Romeo, 2001
- SR2002/147, Alfa Romeo, 2002
- SR2002/148, Nissan, 2002
- LMP2-04/152, Judd, 2004
- LMP2-04/157, according to customer requirements, 2006
- LMP2-04/158, according to customer requirements, 2006
- LMP2-08/165, Judd, 2008
- LMP2-08/166, Judd, 2008
