= Pilbeam Racing Designs =

British racing car company

Pilbeam Racing Designs is a British company which designs and constructs racing cars, based in the Lincolnshire town of Bourne. The company was founded in 1975 by Mike Pilbeam.

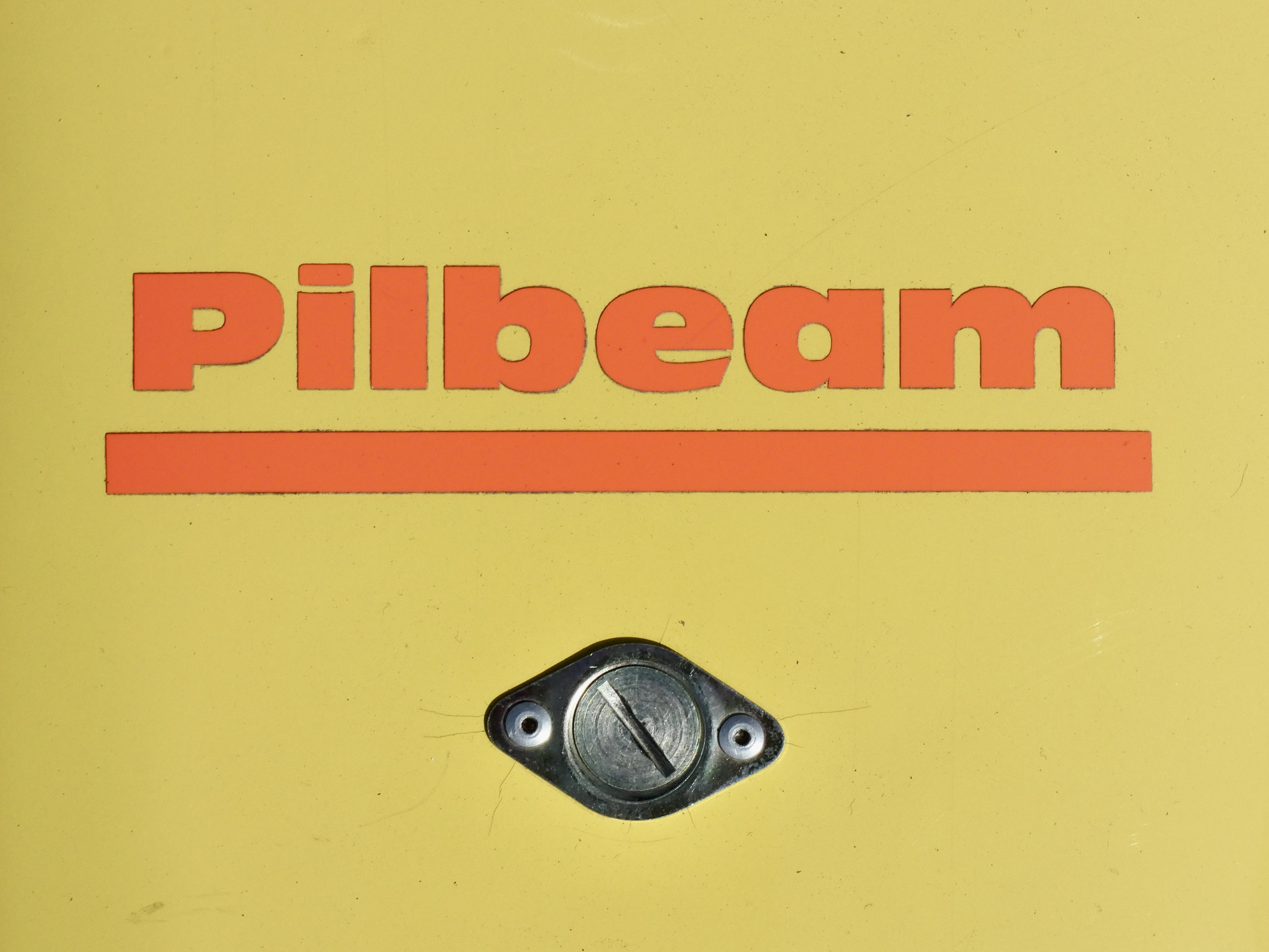
Pilbeam logo, as on the MP88, Shelsley Walsh

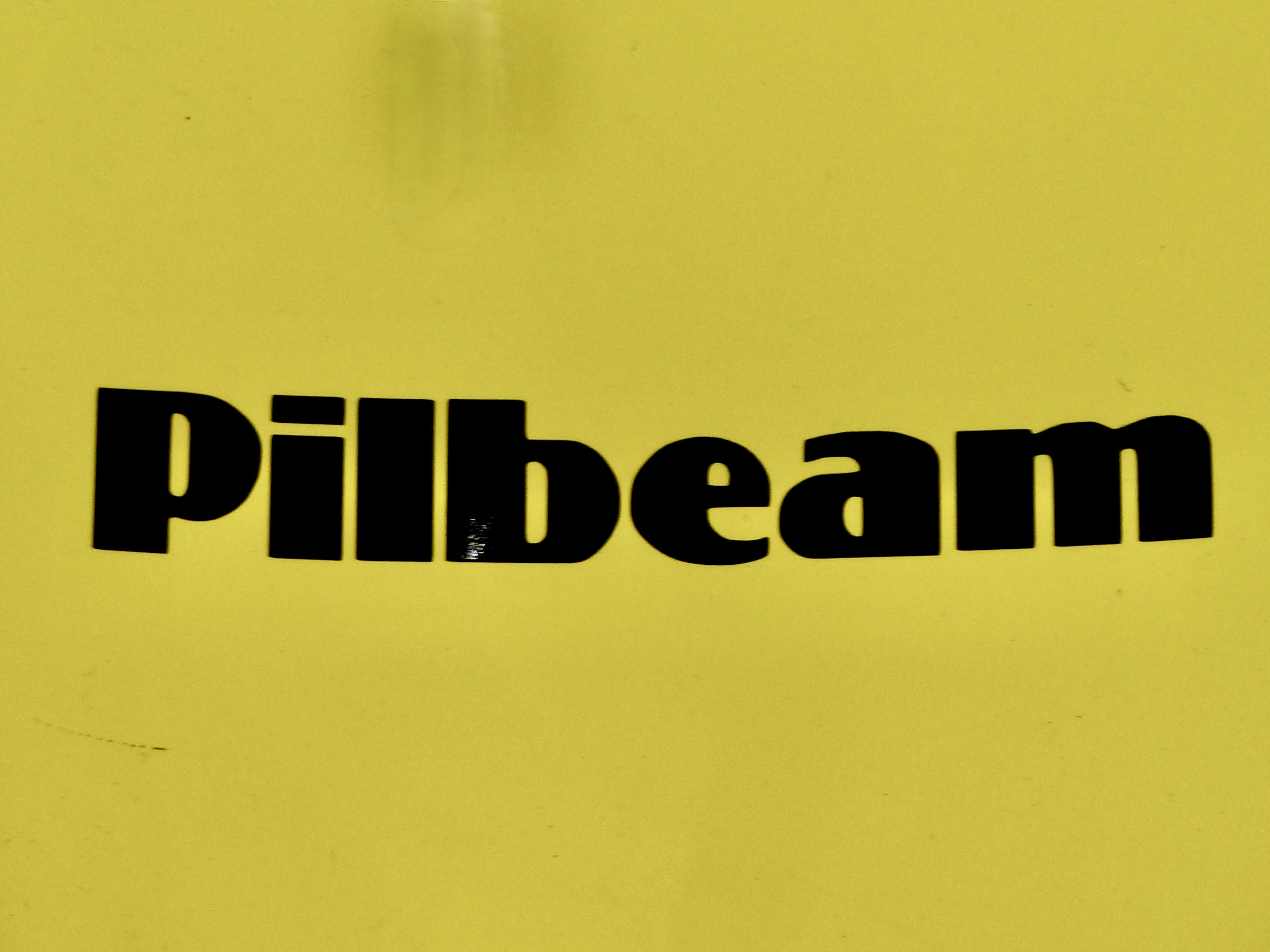
Original Pilbeam logo, as on the MP53 turbo, from 1984, taken at Race Retro Stoneleigh, 2017

== Early career ==
Previously Pilbeam worked in Formula One for several teams, having latterly been Chief Designer for BRM (also based in Bourne), producing the P201. An early project was the BRM P67 from 1964. Pilbeam also worked on the Lotus 7X Clubman's car. He designed the LEC Formula One car for David Purley to race in 1977.

== Hillclimb cars ==
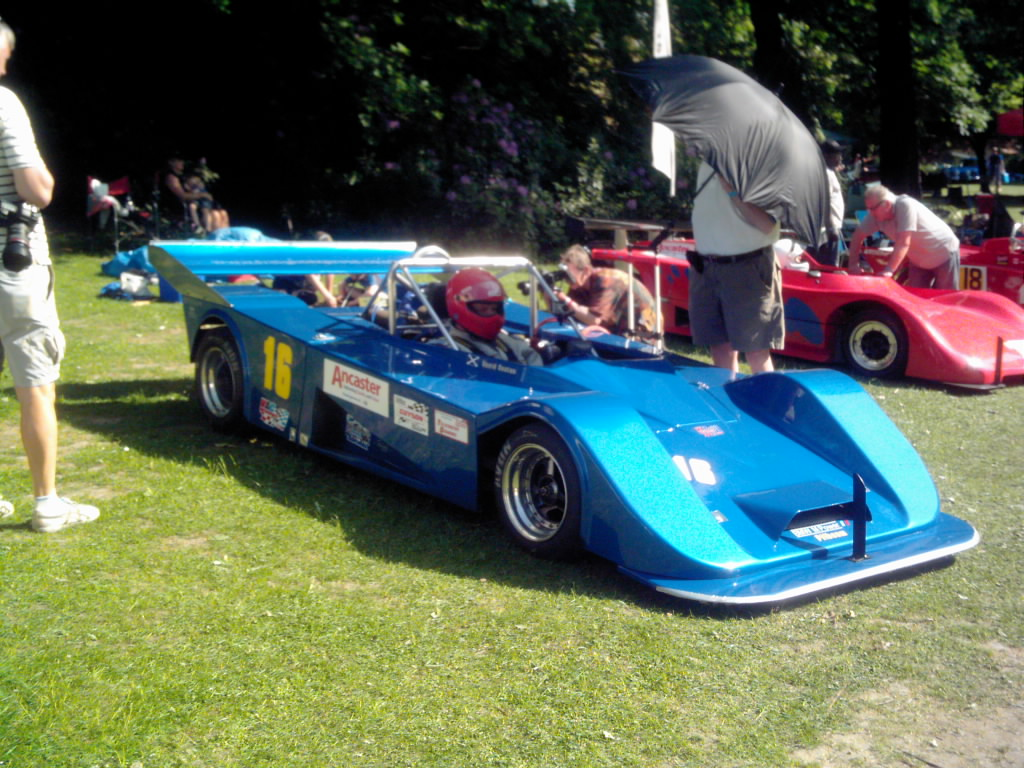
Pilbeam MP43-BMW at Motor Sport at the Palace Crystal Palace (circuit) 27 May 2012

Pilbeam cars have been exceptionally successful in hillclimbing, dominating the 1980s and early 1990s; they were the choice of 17 British Hill Climb Championship winners between 1977 and 1997, powering such drivers as Andy Priaulx and Roy Lane.

== Sports cars ==
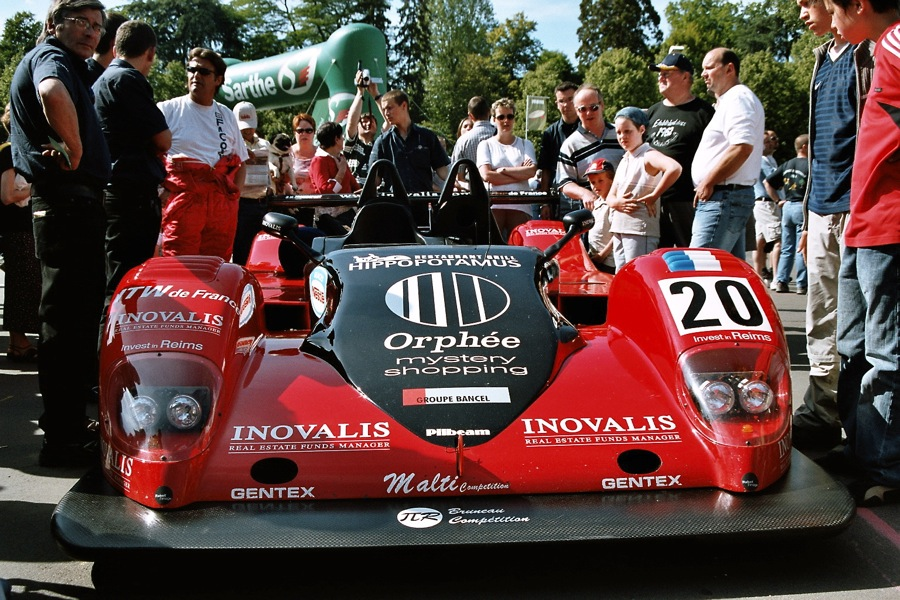
A Pilbeam MP93 run by Pierre Bruneau.

The company has also produced sportscars, initially working on the Pacific Racing BRM P301 project in 1997, then entering Le Mans in 2001 with a car of their own design; and has designed a number of touring cars for manufacturers such as Vauxhall and Honda. Pilbeam's main market these days is in LMP2 prototype racing. The only team that ran the MP93 LMP2, is Pierre Bruneau which took their MP93, with a Judd XV675 powerplant, to three podiums in the Le Mans Series in 2006. On 19 October 2006 an announcement was made stating that Pilbeam would be building a new MP93 for Embassy Racing.

Pilbeam also aided in the design of the Lotus Sport Exige, and currently builds cars for the VdeV Championship.

== Development of engineers ==
Mike Pilbeam is actively involved with the MSc Motorsport Engineering and Management at Cranfield University where he supports thesis projects and serves on the advisory panel for the Motorsport Masters.
