= 1999 SportsRacing World Cup =

1999 Sports Racing World Cup

Seasons
- ← 1998 2000 →

The 1999 Sports Racing World Cup was the third season of Sports Racing World Cup (later known as the FIA Sportscar Championship). It was a series for sportscar style prototypes broken into two classes based on power and weight, called SR1 and SR2. It began on March 28, 1999, and ended November 28, 1999, after 9 races.

== Schedule ==
Rnd	Race	Circuit	Date
1	(Spain) ATP ISRS Trophy Barcelona (2 Hours 30 Minutes)	Circuit de Catalunya	March 28
2	(Italy) 500 km Aprimatic ISRS Trophy	Autodromo Nazionale Monza	April 11
3	(Belgium) 500 km of Spa	Circuit de Spa-Francorchamps	May 16
4	(Italy) Pergusa 2 Hours 30 Minutes	Autodromo di Pergusa	June 27
5	(United Kingdom) RAC Tourist Trophy (2 Hours 30 Minutes)	Donington Park	July 18
6	(Czech Republic) Brno 2 Hours 30 Minutes	Autodrom Brno Masaryk	August 1
7	(Germany) Intl. ADAC Sportwagen Festival (2 Hours 30 Minutes)	Nürburgring	September 5
8	(France) Magny-Cours 2 Hours 30 Minutes	Circuit de Nevers Magny-Cours	September 19
9	(South Africa) Vodacom Festival of Motor Racing (2 Hours 30 Minutes)	Kyalami	November 28

== Season results ==
Rnd	Circuit	SR1 Winning Team	SR2 Winning Team	Results
Rnd	Circuit	SR1 Winning Drivers	SR2 Winning Drivers	Results
1	Barcelona	(France) #1 JB Giesse Team Ferrari	(France) #99 Pierre Bruneau	Results
1	Barcelona	(France) Emmanuel Collard (Italy) Vincenzo Sospiri	(France) Pierre Bruneau (France) Marc Rostan (United Kingdom) Martin Henderson	Results
2	Monza	(France) #1 JB Giesse Team Ferrari	(Italy) #56 Tampolli Engineering	Results
2	Monza	(France) Emmanuel Collard (Italy) Vincenzo Sospiri	(Italy) Paolo Maccari (Italy) Arturo Merzario	Results
3	Spa	(France) #2 JB Giesse Team Ferrari	(Italy) #56 Tampolli Engineering	Results
3	Spa	(Italy) Mauro Baldi (France) Laurent Redon	(Italy) Paolo Maccari (Italy) Arturo Merzario	Results
4	Pergusa	(Italy) #23 BMS Scuderia Italia	(Italy) #53 Siliprandi Racing	Results
4	Pergusa	(Italy) Emanuele Moncini (Italy) Christian Pescatori	(Italy) Piergiuseppe Peroni (Italy) Leonardo Maddalena	Results
5	Donington	(France) #12 DAMS Team	(Belgium) #58 EBRT Schroder Motorsport	Results
5	Donington	(France) Jean-Marc Gounon (France) Éric Bernard	(United Kingdom) Martin Henderson (Netherlands) Stephane van Dyke	Results
6	Brno	(France) #12 DAMS Team	(France) #99 Pierre Bruneau	Results
6	Brno	(France) Jean-Marc Gounon (France) Christophe Tinseau	(France) Pierre Bruneau (France) Marc Rostan	Results
7	Nürburgring	(France) #12 DAMS Team	(Italy) #55 Tampolli Engineering	Results
7	Nürburgring	(France) Jean-Marc Gounon (France) Éric Bernard	(Italy) Giovanna Amati (Italy) Angelo Lancelotti	Results
8	Magny-Cours	(Monaco) #5 GLV Brums	(Italy) #55 Tampolli Engineering	Results
8	Magny-Cours	(Italy) Giovanni Lavaggi (Argentina) Gastón Mazzacane	(Italy) Giovanna Amati (Italy) Angelo Lancelotti	Results
9	Kyalami	(France) #12 DAMS Team	(United Kingdom) #63 Redman Bright	Results
9	Kyalami	(France) Jean-Marc Gounon (France) Éric Bernard	(United Kingdom) Peter Owen (United Kingdom) Mark Smithson	Results

== Teams Championship ==
Points are awarded to the top 10 finishers in the order of 20-15-12-10-8-6-4-3-2-1. Only the highest placing car within a team earned points towards the championship. The SportsRacing World Cup was available to all teams that participated, but a separate SR2 only championship was also held.

=== Overall standings ===
Pos	Team	Car	Engine	Rd 1	Rd 2	Rd 3	Rd 4	Rd 5	Rd 6	Rd 7	Rd 8	Rd 9	Total
1	(France) JB Giesse Team Ferrari	Ferrari 333 SP	Ferrari F310E 4.0L V12	20	20	20	12	12	15	12		10	121
2	(Italy) BMS Scuderia Italia	Ferrari 333 SP	Ferrari F310E 4.0L V12	15		10	20	8	12	15	12	15	107
3	(France) DAMS Team	Lola B98/10	Judd GV4 4.0L V10					20	20	20		20	80
4	(Italy) Target 24	Riley & Scott Mk III	Judd GV4 4.0L V10			12	15	4	10			12	53
5	(Monaco) GLV Brums	Ferrari 333 SP	Ferrari F310E 4.0L V12	10			6	15			20		51
6	(Switzerland) Autosport Racing	Ferrari 333 SP	Ferrari F310E 4.0L V12	8	12	6	8	3	8	3			48
7	(Germany) Kremer Racing	Kremer K8/2 Spyder; Lola B98/10	Porsche 3.0L Turbo Flat-6; Ford (Roush) 6.0L V8	4				1	2		15	4	26
8	(Italy) Cauduro Tampolli Team	Tampolli SR2	Alfa Romeo 3.0L V6		8	3	3				10		24
9	(Netherlands) Dutch National Racing Team	Ferrari 333 SP	Ferrari F310E 4.0L V12		10			2		2		1	15
10	(United Kingdom) Price+Bscher	BMW V12 LM	BMW S70 6.0L V12							10			10
11=	(Italy) Lucchini Engineering	Lucchini SR2-99	Alfa Romeo 3.0L V6								8		8
11=	(France) PiR Bruneau	Debora LMP296	BMW 3.0L I6	2		2			4				8
13	(Netherlands) BRP Competition	Kremer K8 Spyder	Porsche 3.0L Turbo Flat-6	3	4								7
14	(Belgium) EBRT Schroder Motorsport	Pilbeam MP84	Nissan (AER) VQL 3.0L V6								6		6
15	(Italy) Siliprandi	Lucchini SR2-99	Alfa Romeo 3.0L V6		1		4						5
16=	(Italy) SCI	Lucchini SR1-98	Ford Cosworth 3.6L V8								4		4
16=	(Italy) Italtechnica	Ferrari 333 SP	Ferrari F310E 4.0L V12							4			4
16=	(Germany) RWS Motorsport	Riley & Scott Mk III	BMW 4.0L V8			4							4
16=	(Germany) G4 Team Gebhardt	Gebhardt G4	Audi 2.1L Turbo I5							1		3	4
20	(United Kingdom) Mark Bailey Racing	MBR 972	Rover 6R4 3.0L V6		3								3
21=	(Italy) Scuderia Giudici	Picchio MB1	BMW 3.0L I6		2								2
21=	(United Kingdom) Redman Bright	Pilbeam MP84	Nissan (AER) VQL 3.0L V6									2	2
23	(Italy) Luigi Taverna	Osella PA20	BMW 3.0L I6	1									1

=== SR2 standings ===
Pos	Team	Car	Engine	Rd 1	Rd 2	Rd 3	Rd 4	Rd 5	Rd 6	Rd 7	Rd 8	Rd 9	Total
1	(Italy) Cauduro Tampolli Team	Tampolli SR2	Alfa Romeo 3.0L V6	12	20	20	15			20	20	15	122
2	(France) PiR Bruneau	Debora LMP296	BMW 3.0L I6	20	6	15		12	20				73
3	(Belgium) EBRT Schroder Motorsport	Pilbeam MP84	Nissan (AER) VQL 3.0L V6					20		15	12	10	57
4	(Italy) Siliprandi	Lucchini SR2-99	Alfa Romeo 3.0L V6		8		20	15					43
5	(Italy) Lucchini Engineering	Lucchini SR2-99	Alfa Romeo 3.0L V6					8			15		23
6	(United Kingdom) Mark Bailey Racing	MBR 972	Rover 6R4 3.0L V6		12			6				4	22
7=	(Italy) Scuderia Giudici	Picchio MB1	BMW 3.0L I6		10			10					20
7=	(United Kingdom) Redman Bright	Pilbeam MP84	Nissan (AER) VQL 3.0L V6									20	20
9=	(Italy) Luigi Taverna	Osella PA20	BMW 3.0L I6	15									15
9=	(United Kingdom) Grove	Grove Mk.2	Rover 6R4 3.0L V6							12		3	15
11	(South Africa) MMP Motorsport	Pilbeam MP84	Nissan (AER) VQL 3.0L V6									6	6
