= Brno Circuit =

Race track

Creditas Autodrom Brno

- Permanent Grand Prix Circuit (1987–present)
- Location: Brno, Czech Republic
- Coordinates: 49°12′17″N 16°27′02″E
- Capacity: 150,000
- FIA Grade: 2
- Owner: Creditas Group (October 2025–present); Shakai (August 2023–October 2025); Karel Abraham Sr. (2005–August 2023)
- Broke ground: 1985 (for Modern Circuit)
- Opened: 1930 (for Road Circuit); 18 July 1987; 39 years ago (for Modern Circuit)
- Former names: Automotodrom Brno (July 1987–April 2026); Masaryk Circuit (1930–1987)
- Major events: Current: Grand Prix motorcycle racing Czech Republic motorcycle Grand Prix (1965–1982, 1987–1991, 1993–2020, 2025–present); Formula 4 CEZ Championship (2023–present); Future: FIM Moto3 Junior World Championship (2027) Former: World SBK (1993–1996, 2005–2012, 2018); WTCC Race of the Czech Republic (2006–2011); FIM EWC (2001–2003); Sidecar World Championship (1969–1982, 1987–1991, 1993–1997); TCR Eastern Europe (2019–2021, 2023–2025); TCR Europe (2024); Ferrari Challenge Europe (2005, 2009, 2013–2014, 2018, 2021, 2025); DTM (2004–2005); FIA GT1 (2010); FIA GT (2000–2008); A1 Grand Prix (2006–2007); FIA Sportscar Championship Brno 2 Hours 30 Minutes (1997–2002); Czechoslovakian Grand Prix (1930–1935, 1937, 1949, 1976–1988)
- Website: https://www.automotodrombrno.cz/

Permanent Grand Prix Circuit (1987–present)
- Length: 5.403 km (3.357 mi)
- Turns: 14
- Race lap record: 1:36.065 ( (Austria) Ingo Gerstl, Toro Rosso STR1, 2017, BOSS GP/F1)

4th Road Circuit (1975–1986)
- Surface: Asphalt
- Length: 10.925 km (6.788 mi)
- Turns: 29
- Race lap record: 3:29.910 ( (Venezuela) Johnny Cecotto, Yamaha YZR500 (0W35), 1977, 500cc)

3rd Road Circuit (1964–1974)
- Surface: Asphalt
- Length: 13.941 km (8.663 mi)
- Turns: 40
- Race lap record: 4:57.000 ( (Italy) Gianfranco Bonera, MV Agusta 500 Four, 1974, 500cc)

2nd Road Circuit (1949–1963)
- Surface: Asphalt/Cobbles
- Length: 17.800 km (11.060 mi)
- Turns: 73
- Race lap record: 8:03.000 ( (Thailand) Prince Bira/ (Switzerland) Toulo de Graffenried, Maserati 4CLT/48, 1949, GP)

Original Road Circuit (1930–1948)
- Surface: Asphalt/Cobbles
- Length: 29.194 km (18.140 mi)
- Turns: 128
- Race lap record: 11:59.300 ( (Germany) Rudolf Caracciola, Mercedes-Benz W125, 1937, GP)

The Creditas Autodrom Brno, also referred to as the Brno Circuit, refers to two motorsport race tracks located in Brno, Czech Republic.

The original street circuit was made up of public roads, and at its longest measured 29.194 km (18.140 mi). The track is named after the first president of Czechoslovakia, Tomáš Garrigue Masaryk. In 1949, events such as the Czechoslovakian Grand Prix attracted top teams and drivers. In 1987, the new (current) circuit was opened. The Brno Circuit is historically one of the oldest circuits, on the place were also held the most motorcycle championships in history after the TT Circuit Assen.

== Original circuits ==
The original layout ran anti-clockwise on approximately 29.194 km (18.140 mi) of public roads in the outskirts of Brno, where the start/finish was located in Bosonohy. The circuit went east past Kamenny and then went north past the Bohunice University Campus in Kejbaly, and went through the villages of Libusino, Kohoutovice and Žebětín, out to Ostrovacice, through Veselka and back through a series of fast straights and kinks. The circuit was established in 1930 on the initiative of a group of local figures, including physician and racing driver Otakar Bittmann, Bedřich Soffer and Miloš Bondy. From 1930 to 1937, the Masaryk circuit races attracted some of the top drivers and teams.

On 25 September 1949, the race was held for the first and the last time in Czechoslovakia as part of the Grand Prix motor racing (later evolved into Formula One). The Czechoslovakian Grand Prix in 1949 was run clockwise on a shorter 17.800 km (11.060 mi) layout, which turned right at Veselka, bypassed Ostrovacice and entered Žebětín from the south rather than the west. In spite of a crowd in excess of 400,000 people, this would be the last Grand Prix for cars on the old circuit.

Beginning in 1950, the circuit played host to the Czechoslovakian motorcycle Grand Prix, which became a world championship event from 1965. The circuit had been again reduced in length to 13.941 km (8.663 mi) in 1964, completely bypassing Žebětín and using a new through-road that went to Kohoutovice quicker. The European Touring Car series visited in the 1980s, by which time the circuit had been finally reduced to 10.921 km (6.786 mi) in 1975, which exited Kohoutovice from the south and bypassed Libusino and Kejbaly and went right through Kamenny and rejoined the main road back to Bosonohy. As of 2026, all the public roads used for the original circuits are still existing.

== Modern circuit ==
The current 5.403 km (3.357 mi) permanent road racing circuit was opened on 18 July 1987. It lies north of Kyvalka, within the bounds of the circuit used in the 1930s, but not incorporating any of the public roads. The motorcycle race moved to the new circuit and regained its status as a round of the world championship. A World Sports Car Championship race was held in 1988, and a round of the A1 Grand Prix series in 2006. It was also the location of the 24H Epilog of Brno (previously 6 Hours of Brno).

The annual Motorcycle Grand Prix of the Czech Republic is the circuit's most important event. It has been held here since 1950 and is the most famous motor race in the Czech Republic. The race is part of the World Grand Prix in the years of 1965–1982, 1987–1991, 1993–2020, 2025-2029.

The FIA World Touring Car Championship, FIA GT1 World Championship, Formula Two Championship and the Superbike World Championship also raced at the circuit.

The Czech Republic Motorcycle Grand Prix was more of a promoter event than a profit-raiser itself. Since tobacco advertising has been banned in 2007, it is common among the other MotoGP events. From 2023 to 2025, the circuit was owned by the Czech company Shakai. On October 2025, the circuit was acquired again by another Czech company, Creditas Group.

On 29 April 2026, the circuit's name is changed to Creditas Autodrom Brno.

== Layout history ==
CREDITAS Autodrom Brno Layout History
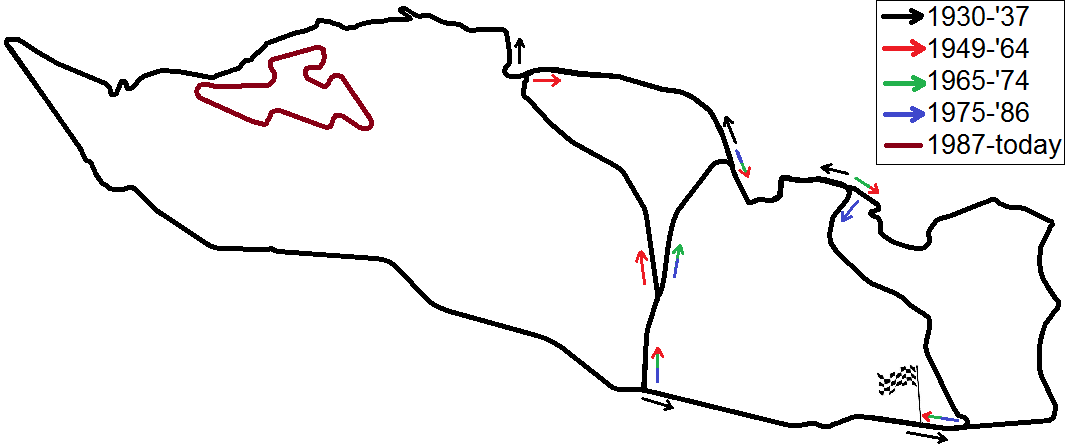
All layouts of the circuit between 1930 and today combined

Brno Circuit (1930–1937)

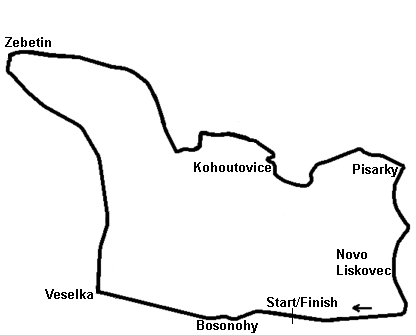
Brno Circuit (1949–1964)

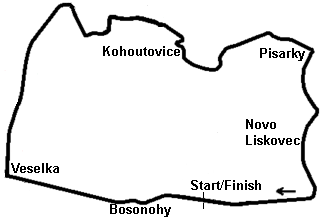
Brno Circuit (1965–1974)

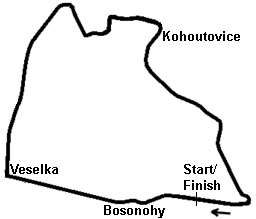
Brno Circuit (1975–1986)

Brno Circuit (1987–present)

== Events ==
Current

- May: Histo-Cup Austria Histo Cup Brünn, IDM Superbike Championship
- June: Grand Prix motorcycle racing Czech Republic motorcycle Grand Prix, Moto4 Northern Cup
- July: Alpe Adria International Motorcycle Championship
- September: Formula 4 CEZ Championship Masaryk Racing Days, GT Cup Series

Future

- FIM Moto2 European Championship (2027)
- FIM Moto3 Junior World Championship (2027)
- TCR European Endurance (2027)

Former

- 24H Series
  - 12 Hours of Brno (2015–2016, 2019)
- A1 Grand Prix (2006–2007)
- Austria Formula 3 Cup (1992, 1995–1999, 2014–2024)
- Auto GP (2002–2005, 2010–2011, 2013, 2016)
- BOSS GP (2014–2023)
- British Talent Cup (2019)
- Czechoslovakian Grand Prix (1930–1935, 1937, 1949, 1976–1988)
- Deutsche Tourenwagen Masters (2004–2005)
- Deutsche Tourenwagen Meisterschaft (1988, 1991–1992)
- Eurocup Formula Renault 2.0 (2001, 2003–2004, 2010)
- Eurocup Mégane Trophy (2010)
- European Touring Car Championship (1968–1972, 1975–1986, 2000–2004)
- European Touring Car Cup (2013, 2015)
- EuroV8 Series (2014)
- Ferrari Challenge Europe (2005, 2009, 2013–2014, 2018, 2021, 2025)
- Ferrari Challenge Italy (2009)
- FIA Formula Two Championship (2009–2010)
- FIA GT Championship (2000–2008)
- FIA GT1 World Championship (2010)
- FIA GT3 European Championship (2007–2008, 2010)
- FIA Sportscar Championship
  - Brno 2 Hours 30 Minutes (1997–2002)
- FIM Endurance World Championship (2001–2003)
- Formul'Academy Euro Series (2008)
- Formula 3 Euro Series (2004)
- Formula BMW ADAC (2004–2005)
- Formula Renault 2.0 Northern European Cup (2010)
- Formula Renault 3.5 Series (2010)
- Formula Renault V6 Eurocup (2004)
- German Formula Three Championship (1988–1989, 1992)
- GT4 European Cup (2008)
- International Formula Master (2006–2009)
- International GTSprint Series (2013)
- Italian Formula Renault Championship (2008)
- Porsche Carrera Cup Germany (1987, 1992, 2004)
- Porsche Carrera Cup Italia (2010)
- Red Bull MotoGP Rookies Cup (2007–2017)
- SEAT León Eurocup (2009–2010)
- Sidecar World Championship (1969–1982, 1987–1991, 1993–1997)
- Superbike World Championship (1993–1996, 2005–2012, 2018)
- Supersport 300 World Championship (2018)
- Supersport World Championship (2005–2012, 2018)
- Superstars Series (2013)
- TCR Eastern Europe Touring Car Series (2019–2021, 2023–2025)
- TCR Europe Touring Car Series (2024)
- Trofeo Maserati (2006)
- World Sportscar Championship
  - 360 km of Brno (1988)
- World Touring Car Championship
  - FIA WTCC Race of the Czech Republic (2006–2011).

== Lap records ==
The unofficial lap record is 1:34.700 set by Jérôme d'Ambrosio in Renault R29 Formula One car in 2010. As of September 2026, the fastest official race lap records at the Brno Circuit are listed as:

Category	Time	Driver	Vehicle	Event
Grand Prix Circuit (1987–present): 5.403 km (3.357 mi)
BOSS GP/F1	1:36.065	Ingo Gerstl	Toro Rosso STR1	2017 Brno BOSS GP Series round
Auto GP/A1GP	1:43.260	Luca Filippi	Lola B05/52	2010 Brno Auto GP round
Formula Renault 3.5	1:44.591	Daniel Ricciardo	Dallara T08	2010 Brno Formula Renault 3.5 round
BOSS GP/GP2	1:44.940	Johann Ledermair	Dallara GP2/11	2017 Brno BOSS GP Series round
F2 (2009–2012)	1:48.246	Nicola de Marco	Williams JPH1B	2010 Brno Formula Two round
International Formula Master	1:49.733	Josef Král	Tatuus N.T07	2009 Brno Formula Master round
Group C1	1:49.770	Mauro Baldi	Sauber C9	1988 360 km of Brno
F3000	1:49.798	Maro Engel	Lola B02/50	2005 Brno Italian F3000 round
Formula Three	1:51.258	Sandro Zeller	Dallara F316	2026 Brno Austria Formula Cup Round
Formula Regional	1:51.475	Václav Šafář	Tatuus F3 T-318	2026 Brno Austria Formula Cup Round
LMP900	1:51.858	Jan Lammers	Dome S101	2002 Brno FIA Sportscar Championship round
WSC	1:52.271	Jean-Marc Gounon	Ferrari 333 SP	2001 FIA Sportscar Championship Brno
CN	1:52.934	Marco Fink	Nova Proto NP01	2026 Brno GT Cup round
GT1 (GTS)	1:53.106	Marcel Fässler	Chevrolet Corvette C6.R	2008 FIA GT Brno 2 Hours
MotoGP	1:53.122	Fabio Di Giannantonio	Ducati Desmosedici GP26	2026 Czech Republic motorcycle Grand Prix
DTM	1:54.786	Martin Tomczyk	Audi A4 DTM 2005	2005 Brno DTM round
Group C2	1:54.960	Costas Los	Spice SE87C	1988 360 km of Brno
LMP3	1:55.416	Miro Konôpka	Ligier JS P320	2025 Brno GT Cup Endurance round
GT3	1:56.018	Jesse Krohn	BMW M4 GT3	2025 Brno GT Cup round
Formula Renault 2.0	1:56.226	Arthur Pic	Barazi-Epsilon FR2.0-10	2010 Brno Formula Renault Eurocup 2.0 round
LMP675	1:57.389	Roberto Tonetti	Lucchini SR2001	2001 FIA Sportscar Championship Brno
Superbike	1:57.635	Markus Reiterberger	BMW M1000RR	2026 Brno Euro Moto Superbike round
SRO GT2	1:57.886	Marius Aigner	KTM X-Bow GT2	2025 Brno GT Cup Endurance round
Ferrari Challenge	1:57.918	Felix Hirsiger	Ferrari 296 Challenge	2025 Brno Ferrari Challenge round
LMP2	1:57.988	Miro Konôpka	Ligier JS P217	2021 Brno ESET Cup round
Formula 4	1:57.989	Elia Weiss	Tatuus F4-T421	2026 Brno Formula 4 CEZ round
GT2	1:58.193	Richard Westbrook	Porsche 911 (997) GT3-RSR	2008 FIA GT Brno 2 Hours
Moto2	1:58.590	Filip Salač	Kalex Moto2	2026 Czech Republic motorcycle Grand Prix
World SBK	1:59.291	Cal Crutchlow	Yamaha YZF-R1	2010 Brno World SBK round
Lamborghini Super Trofeo	1:59.484	Dennis Waszek	Lamborghini Huracán LP 620-2 Super Trofeo EVO2	2025 Brno GT Cup round
Porsche Carrera Cup	2:00.525	Markus Kajak	Porsche 911 (992 I) GT3 Cup	2026 Brno Porsche Sprint Challenge Central Europe round
FIA GT Group 2	2:01.107	Bas Leinders	Gillet Vertigo	2008 FIA GT Brno 2 Hours
500cc	2:01.461	Valentino Rossi	Honda NSR500	2001 Czech Republic motorcycle Grand Prix
Supersport	2:01.535	Dirk Geiger	Yamaha YZF-R9	2026 Brno Euro Moto Supersport round
250cc	2:02.299	Jorge Lorenzo	Aprilia RSW 250	2007 Czech Republic motorcycle Grand Prix
World SSP	2:02.708	Cal Crutchlow	Yamaha YZF-R6	2009 Brno World SSP round
N-GT	2:04.127	Stéphane Ortelli	Porsche 911 (996) GT3-RSR	2004 FIA GT Brno 500km
Moto3	2:04.524	Veda Pratama	Honda NSF250RW	2026 Czech Republic motorcycle Grand Prix
Formula BMW	2:04.624	Sebastian Vettel	Mygale FB02	2004 Brno Formula BMW ADAC round
Eurocup Mégane Trophy	2:05.930	Nicky Catsburg	Renault Mégane Renault Sport II	2010 Brno Eurocup Mégane Trophy round
Group A	2:07.160	Keke Rosberg	Mercedes 190E 2.5-16 Evo2	1992 Brno DTM round
Sportbike	2:07.448	Jakob Rosenthaler	Triumph Daytona 660	2026 Brno Euro Moto Sportbike round
GT4	2:07.518	Dobroslav Kárník	BMW M4 GT4 Evo	2025 Brno GT Cup round
Super Touring	2:07.522	Nicola Larini	Alfa Romeo 156 D2	2001 Brno ESTC round
125cc	2:07.836	Lucio Cecchinello	Aprilia RS125R	2003 Czech Republic motorcycle Grand Prix
TCR Touring Car	2:08.342	Jiří Zbožínek	Hyundai Elantra N TCR	2025 Brno TCR Eastern Europe Trophy round
Super 2000	2:10.108	Félix Porteiro	BMW 320si WTCC	2008 FIA WTCC Race of the Czech Republic
SEAT León Eurocup	2:10.445	Norbert Michelisz	SEAT León Supercopa	2009 Brno SEAT León Eurocup round
Supersport 300	2.17.827	Imanuel Putra Pratna	Yamaha YZF-R3	2018 Brno Supersport 300 round
Renault Clio Cup	2:21.002	Tomáš Pekar	Renault Clio R.S. V	2025 Brno Clio Cup Bohemia round
Super 1600	2:26.195	Gilles Bruckner	Ford Fiesta ST	2013 Brno ETC round
4th Road Circuit (1975–1986): 10.925 km (6.788 mi)
500cc	3:29.690	Johnny Cecotto	Yamaha YZR500 (0W35)	1977 Czechoslovak motorcycle Grand Prix
Group 2	3:31.190	Dieter Quester	BMW 3.0 CSL	1975 Brno ETCC round
Group A	3:32.080	Anders Olofsson	Volvo 240 Turbo	1986 Brno ETCC round
350cc	3:39.900	Johnny Cecotto	Yamaha TZ 350	1977 Czechoslovak motorcycle Grand Prix
250cc	3:46.890	Walter Villa	Harley-Davidson RR250	1977 Czechoslovak motorcycle Grand Prix
Sidecar (B2A)	3:50.960	Werner Schwärzel	Aro sidecar	1977 Czechoslovak motorcycle Grand Prix
125cc	4:00.010	Guy Bertin	Motobécane 125	1979 Czechoslovak motorcycle Grand Prix
50cc	4:48.650	Ricardo Tormo	Bultaco TSS 50	1978 Czechoslovak motorcycle Grand Prix
3rd Road Circuit (1964–1974): 13.941 km (8.663 mi)
500cc	4:57.000	Gianfranco Bonera	MV Agusta 500 Four	1974 Czechoslovak motorcycle Grand Prix
Group 2	4:59.100	Jochen Mass	Ford Capri RS 2600	1972 Brno ETCC round
350cc	5:07.100	Teuvo Länsivuori	Yamaha TZ 350	1973 Czechoslovak motorcycle Grand Prix
250cc	5:13.700	Bill Ivy	Yamaha 250 V4	1967 Czechoslovak motorcycle Grand Prix
Group 5	5:18.300	Helmut Marko	Chevrolet Camaro	1969 Brno ETCC round
125cc	5:30.500	Yoshimi Katayama	Yamaha AS1	1967 Czechoslovak motorcycle Grand Prix
50cc	6:22.100	Henk van Kessel	Kreidler 50 GP	1974 Czechoslovak motorcycle Grand Prix
2nd Road Circuit (1949–1963): 17.800 km (11.060 mi)
Grand Prix	8:03.000	Prince Bira (Note: Both drivers took the fastest lap independently.); Toulo de Graffenried	Maserati 4CLT/48	1949 Czechoslovakian Grand Prix
Original Road Circuit (1930–1948): 29.194 km (18.140 mi)
Grand Prix	11:59.300	Rudolf Caracciola	Mercedes-Benz W125	1937 Masaryk Grand Prix
Voiturette	14:55.000	Giuseppe Farina	Maserati 4CM	1934 Masaryk Grand Prix

== Gallery ==
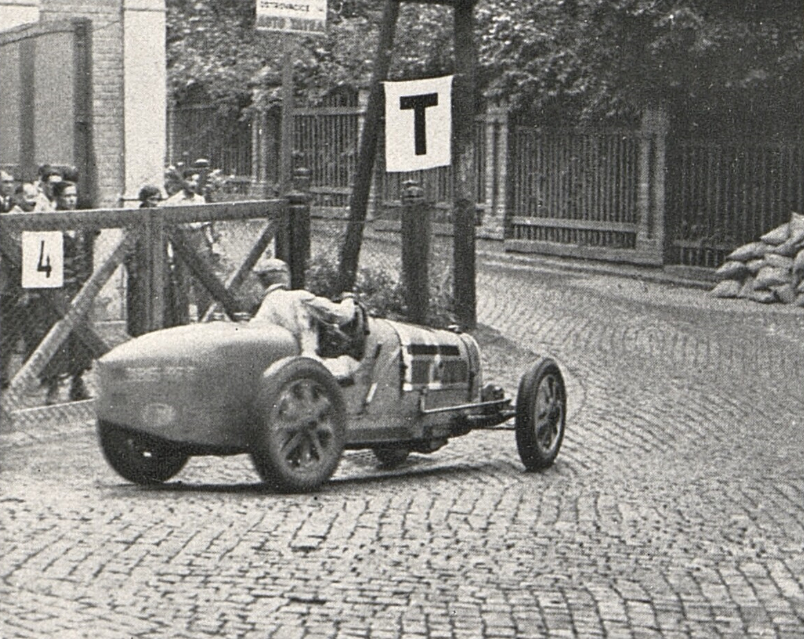
Winning Louis Chiron in Bugatti, Brno 1932

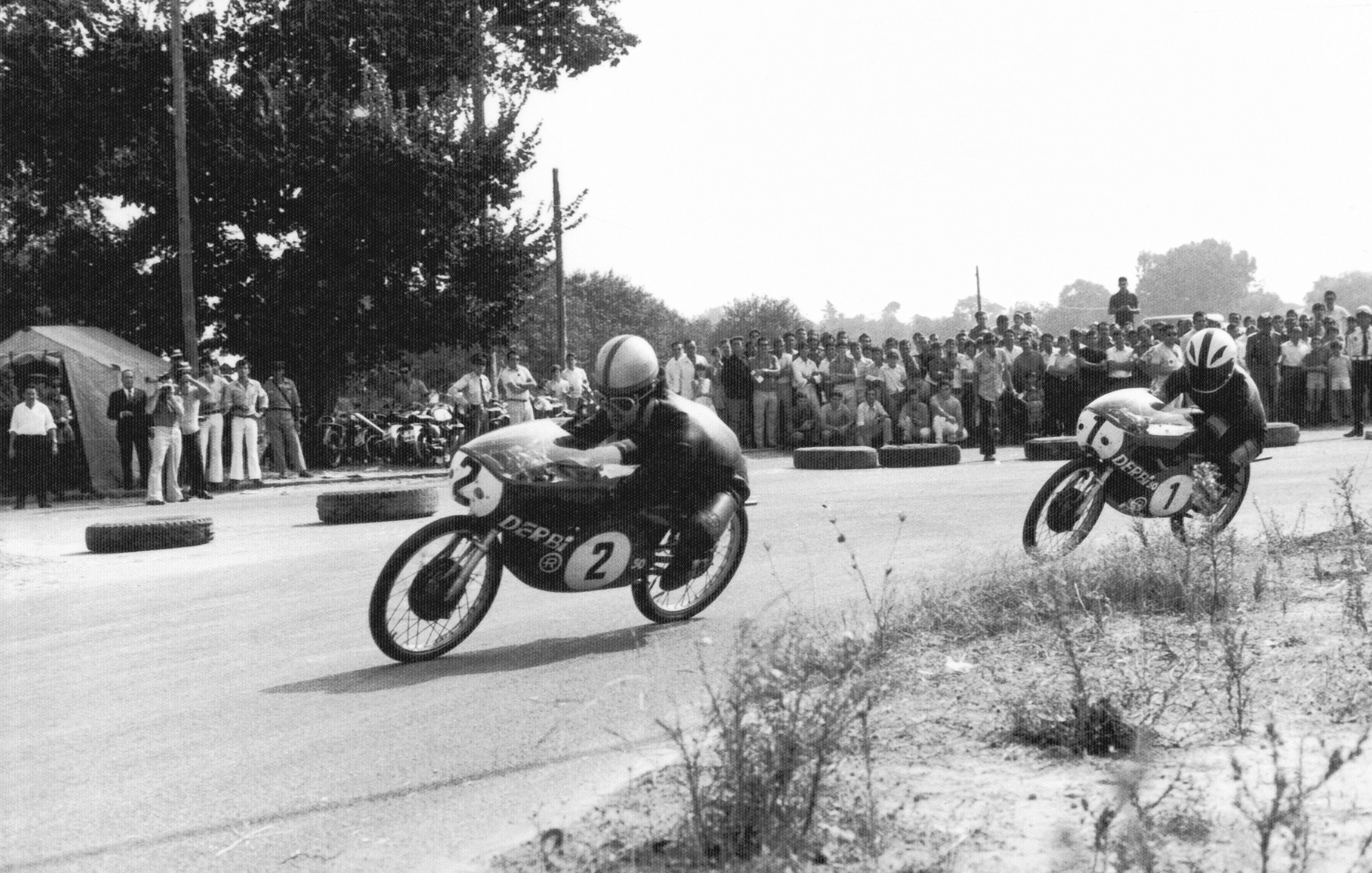
Ángel Nieto during Grand Prix motorcycle racing in Brno, 1971

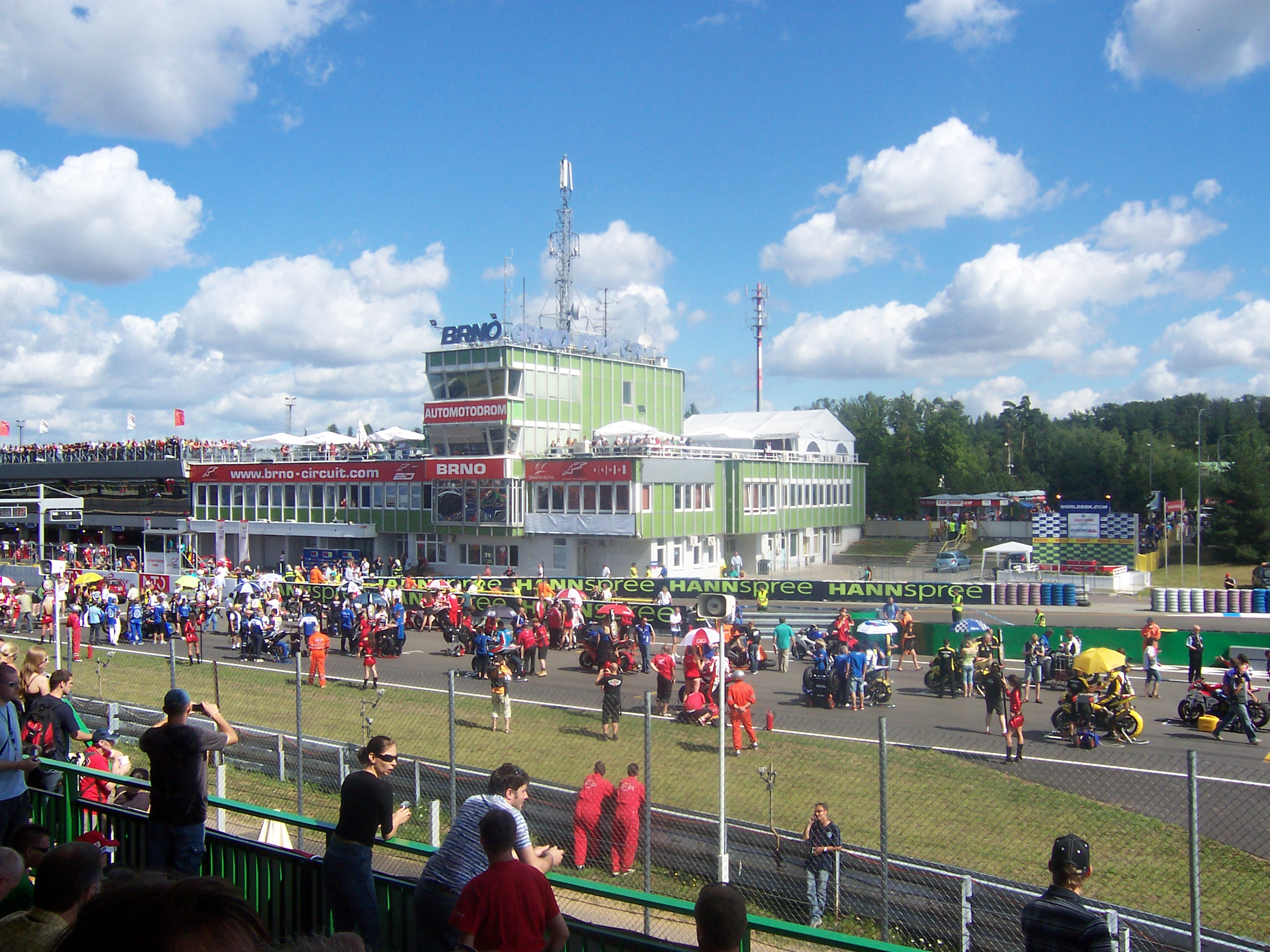
Starting grid on the Brno Circuit

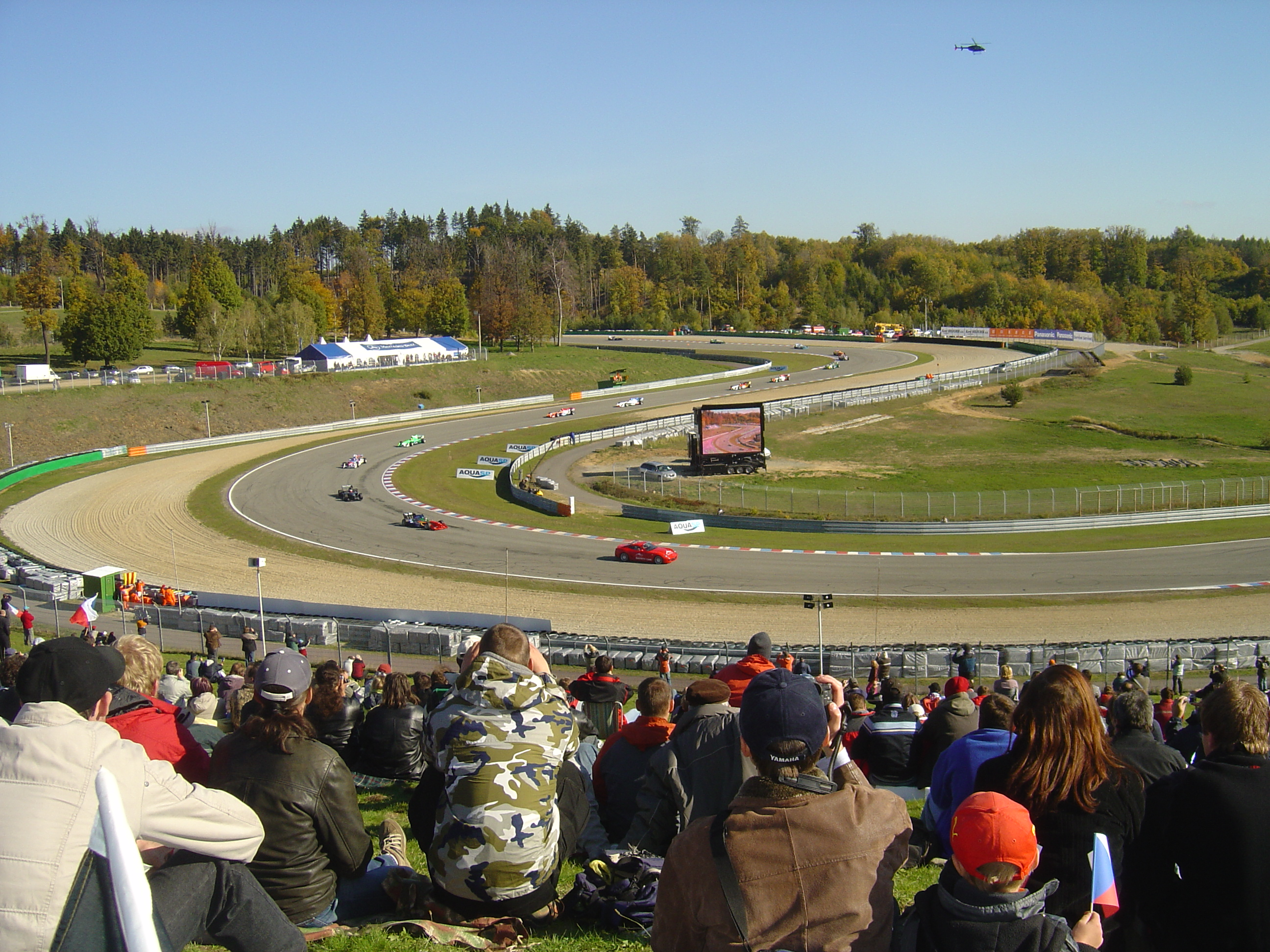
Omega bend of the Brno Circuit

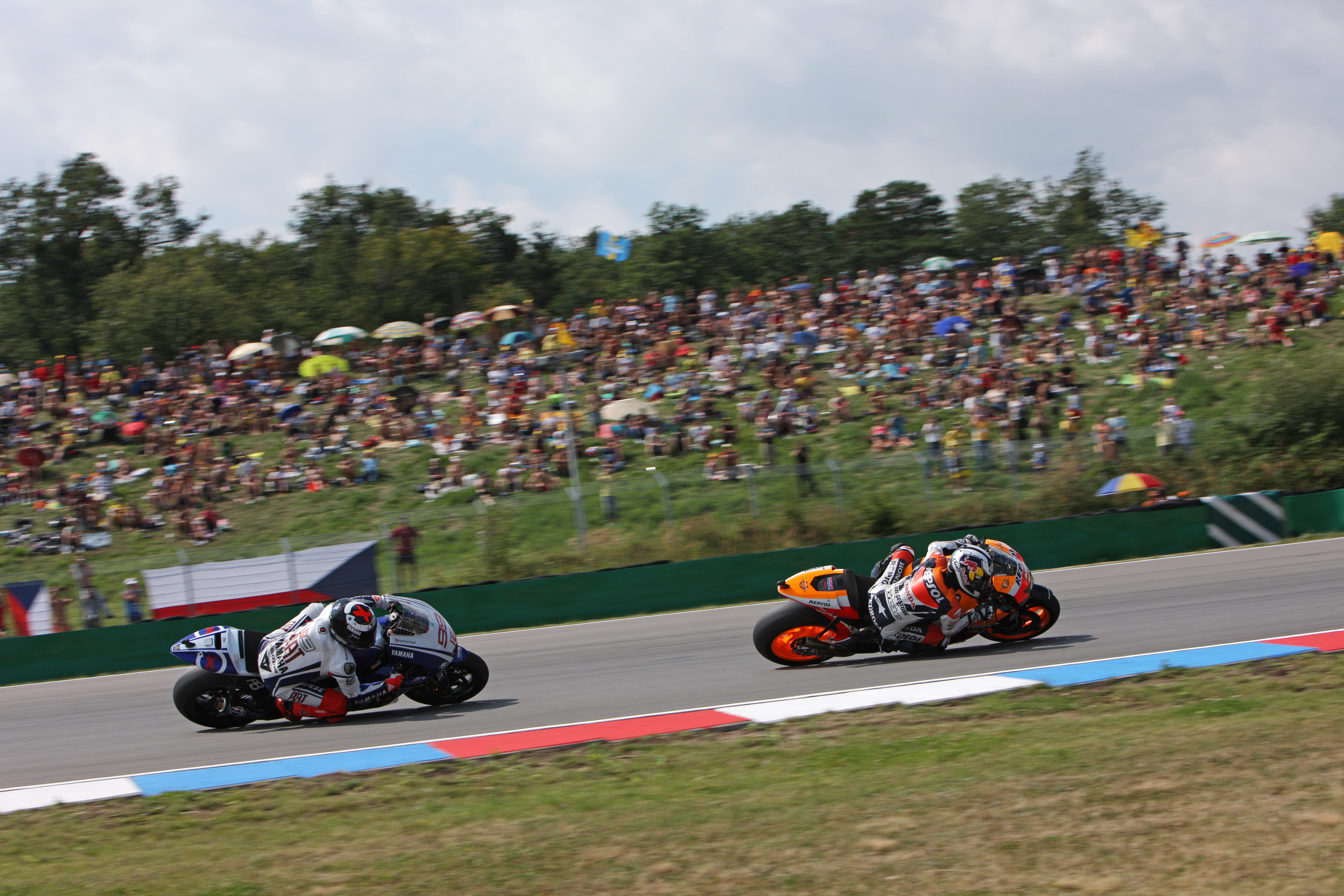
Dani Pedrosa and Jorge Lorenzo in Brno, 2009

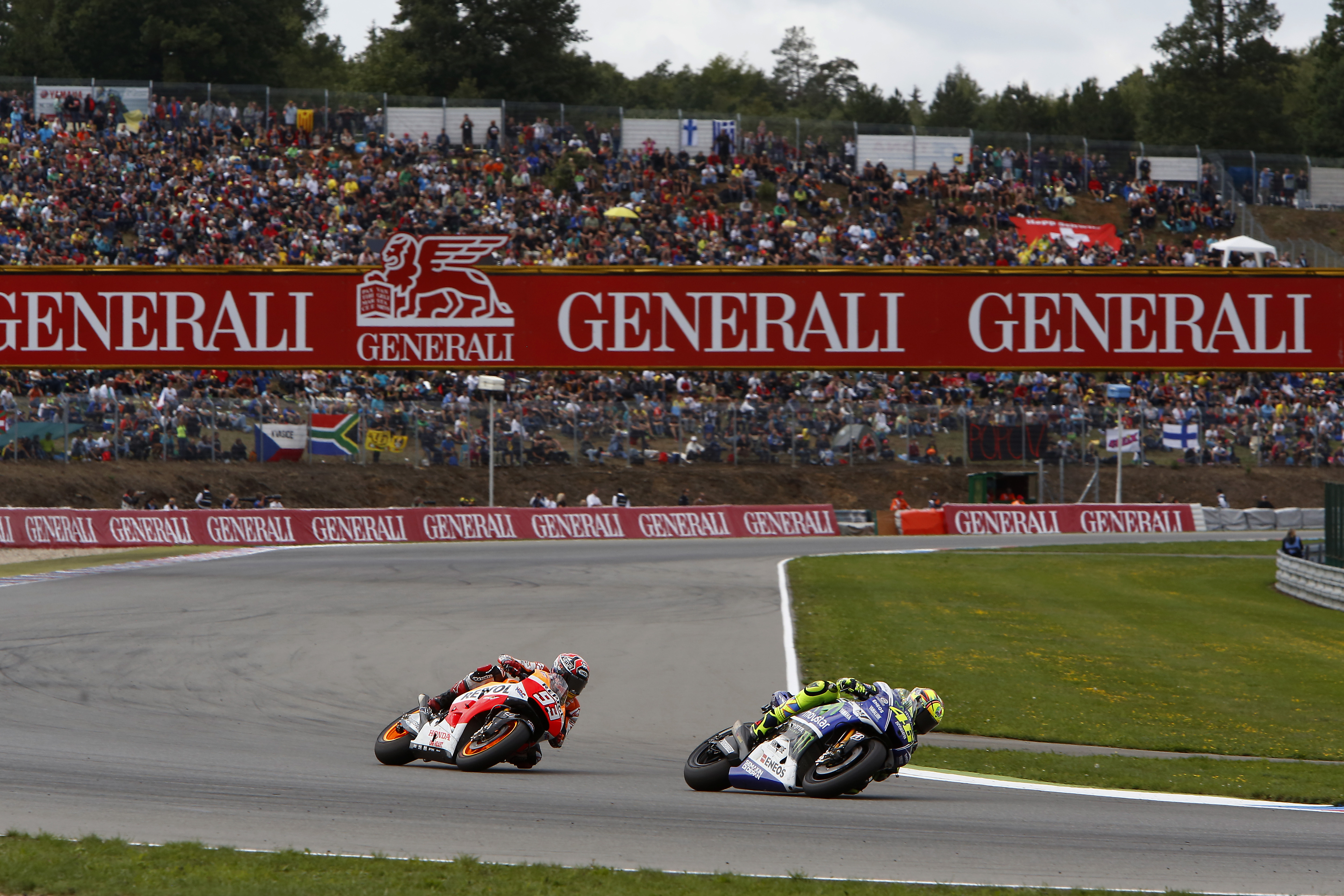
Marc Márquez and Valentino Rossi in Brno, 2014

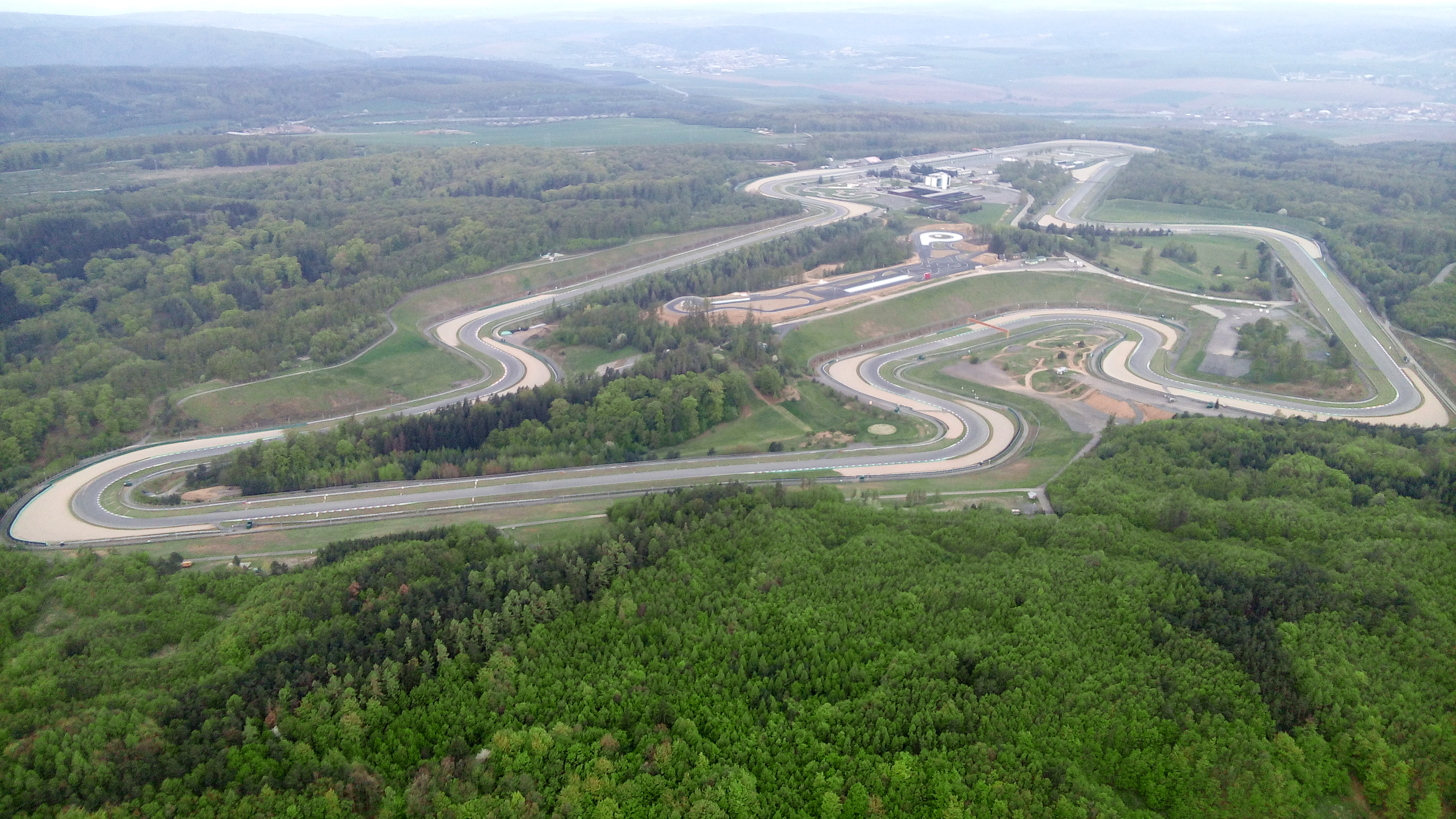
Brno Circuit from air

== See also ==
- Autodrom Most: Other race track in the Czech Republic
