= 1949 Czechoslovakian Grand Prix =

1949 Czechoslovakia Grand Prix
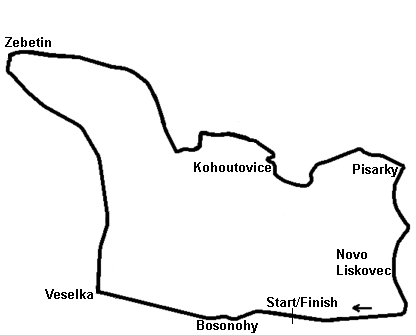

Race details
- Date: 25 September 1949
- Official name: I Velká cena Československa
- Location: Brno, Czechoslovakia
- Course: Road course
- Course length: 17.8 km (11.1 miles)
- Distance: 20 laps, 356.01 km (221.21 miles)

Pole position
Driver	(Thailand) Prince Bira	Maserati 4CLT/48
- Time: Drawn

Fastest lap
Drivers	(Thailand) Prince Bira	Maserati 4CLT/48
	(Switzerland) Emmanuel de Graffenried	Maserati 4CLT/48
- Time: 8:03.0

Podium
First	(United Kingdom) Peter Whitehead	Ferrari 125
Second	(France) Philippe Étancelin	Talbot-Lago T26C
Third	(Italy) Franco Cortese	Ferrari F2

The I Velká cena Československa was a Grand Prix motor race which was held at Masaryk Circuit on 25 September 1949. The race was won by Peter Whitehead driving a Ferrari 125. Czechoslovak driver Václav Uher died in crash during practice. Giuseppe Farina crashed into spectators in the first lap of the race and killed two of them. Tatraplan of Bruno Sojka was in streamlined configuration. This was the last Grand Prix before the rise of the Formula One World Championship.

== Race ==
Pos	No	Driver	Constructor	Laps	Time/Retired	Grid
1	14	(United Kingdom) Peter Whitehead	Ferrari 125	20	2:48:41.0	8
2	3	(France) Philippe Étancelin	Talbot-Lago T26C	20	+35.6	5
3	15	(Italy) Franco Cortese	Ferrari 166 C	20	+ 4:49.4	17
4	2	(France) Pierre Levegh	Talbot-Lago T26C	19	+ 1 Lap	13
5	8	(France) Henri Louveau	Maserati 4CL	19	+ 1 Lap	23
6	1	(Belgium) Johnny Claes	Talbot-Lago T26C	19	+ 1 Lap	12
7	6	(Italy) Piero Carini	Maserati A6GCS	18	+ 2 Laps	14
8	4	(France) Louis Rosier	Talbot-Lago T26C	18	+ 2 Laps	11
9	22	(Czechoslovakia) Bruno Sojka	Tatra 602	18	+ 2 Laps	18
10	26	(Czechoslovakia) Jaroslav Vlček	Magda II-Fiat	17	+ 3 Laps	20
11	27	(Czechoslovakia) František Dobrý	Frazer Nash-Bristol	17	+ 3 Laps	19
Ret	9	(Switzerland) Emmanuel de Graffenried	Maserati 4CLT/48	13	Engine	3
Ret	11	(United Kingdom) David Murray	Maserati 4CLT/48	13	Engine	16
Ret	17	(France) Maurice Trintignant	Simca-Gordini T15	9	Accident	9
Ret	7	(Monaco) Louis Chiron	Maserati 4CLT/48	8	Gearbox	4
Ret	24	(Czechoslovakia) Antonín Komár	Cisitalia D46-Fiat	6	Differential	21
Ret	18	(France) Robert Manzon	Simca-Gordini T15	4	Valve	6
Ret	10	(Thailand) B. Bira	Maserati 4CLT/48	3	Accident	1
Ret	19	(Czechoslovakia) Zdeněk Trejbal	Simca-Gordini T15	2	Engine	10
Ret	23	(Czechoslovakia) Vladimír Formánek	Cisitalia D46-Fiat	1	Engine	22
Ret	12	(United Kingdom) Reg Parnell	Maserati 4CLT/48	1	Accident	7
Ret	5	(Italy) Giuseppe Farina	Maserati 4CLT/48	1	Accident	2
DNS	41	(France) Aldo Gordini	Simca-Gordini T15	0	Did not start	15
DNS	25	(Czechoslovakia) Václav Uher	Maserati 6CM	-	Fatal practice accident	-
DNS	28	(Czechoslovakia) Karel Vlašín	Mono JK-Lancia	-	Collision with truck in practice	-
DNA	16	(United States) Luigi Chinetti	Ferrari 125	-	Did not arrive	-
DNA	20	(France) Marc Versini	Delage D6-3LS	-	Did not arrive	-
DNA	21	(Czechoslovakia) Jiří Pohl	MG K3	-	Did not arrive	-

Grand Prix Race
1949 Grand Prix season
Previous race: 1937 Czechoslovakian Grand Prix	Czechoslovakian Grand Prix	Next race: 1950 Czechoslovakian Grand Prix
