= 2017 BOSS GP Series =

Motorsport season

The 2017 BOSS GP season was the 23rd season of the BOSS GP series. The championship began on 21 April at Hockenheim and finished on 1 October at Imola.

== Teams and Drivers ==
Team	Chassis	Engine	No.	Driver	Rounds
Open Class
Top Speed	Toro Rosso STR1	Cosworth TJ2005 3.0 L V10	1	(Austria) Ingo Gerstl	1, 3, 5–7
GP Racing	Panoz DP01	Judd GV 4.2 L V10	3	(Austria) Peter Milavec	1
Penn Elcom Racing	Benetton B197	Judd GV 4.2 L V10	7	(United States) Phil Stratford	1, 4, 7
Mansell Motorsport	Dallara GP2/08 Evo	Judd GV 4.0 L V10	11	(Netherlands) Rinus van Kalmthout	2–3, 7
Mansell Motorsport	Benetton B197	Judd GV 4.2 L V10	12	(Netherlands) Marijn van Kalmthout	2
Team Griffith's	AGS JH23	Cosworth DFR 3.5 L V10	14	(France) Patrick D'Aubreby	3
H&A Racing	Arrows A22	Asiatech 001 3.0 L V10	21	(Austria) Bernd Herndlhofer	1, 6
FXtreme Racing Team	Super Aguri SA06	Cosworth TJ2005 3.0 L V10	26	(Germany) Wolfgang Jaksch	1, 3, 5–6
Team Ascari	Jaguar R5	Cosworth CR-6 3.0 L V10	66	(Netherlands) Klaas Zwart	1, 4–5
Formula Class
Speed Center - Castrol	Dallara GP2/08	Mecachrome V8108 4.0 L V8	101	(Switzerland) Peter Göllner	2–3, 5–6
Speed Center - Castrol	Dallara GP2/08	Mecachrome V8108 4.0 L V8	555	(Switzerland) Christian Eicke	1–3, 5–6
H&A Racing	Dallara GP2/05	Mecachrome V8108 4.0 L V8	105	(Germany) Wolfgang Jordan	3–5
H&A Racing	Dallara GP2/05	Mecachrome V8108 4.0 L V8	222	(Czech Republic) Veronika Cicha	3, 5–6
FXtreme Racing Team	Dallara GP2/08	Mecachrome V8108 4.0 L V8	222	(Czech Republic) Veronika Cicha	1
Easy Formula	Dallara T08	Renault VQ35DE 3.5 L V6	111	(France) 'Peter'	1–2, 5, 7
PS Racing	Lola B05/52	Gibson ZG348 3.4 L V8	115	(India) Mahaveer Raghunathan	All
PS Racing	Lola B05/52	Gibson ZG348 3.4 L V8	116	(Switzerland) Nicolas Matile	7
Team Griffith's	Dallara GP2/05	Mecachrome V8108 4.0 L V8	127	(France) Bruno Navarrete	3
Team Griffith's	Dallara GP2/05	Mecachrome V8108 4.0 L V8	150	(France) David Moretti	3
Zig-Zag	Dallara GP2/08	Mecachrome V8108 4.0 L V8	129	(Monaco) Marc Faggionato	2, 5
De Boer Manx	Dallara GP2/08	Mecachrome V8108 4.0 L V8	136	(Netherlands) Henk de Boer	2–4, 6
De Boer Manx	Dallara GP2/08	Mecachrome V8108 4.0 L V8	139	(Netherlands) René Kouwenberg	7
Fiedler Racing	Dallara GP2/05	Mecachrome V8108 4.0 L V8	321	(Germany) Andreas Fiedler	1, 6
MM International Motorsport	Dallara GP2/11	Mecachrome V8108 4.0 L V8	323	(Italy) Armando Mangini	1
MM International Motorsport	Lola B02/50	Zytek KV 3.0 L V8	323	(Italy) Armando Mangini	2
MM International Motorsport	Dallara GP2/05	Mecachrome V8108 4.0 L V8	323	(Italy) Armando Mangini	3–7
MM International Motorsport	Dallara GP2/05	Mecachrome V8108 4.0 L V8	999	(Italy) Salvatore de Plano	1–2
MM International Motorsport	Dallara GP2/11	Mecachrome V8108 4.0 L V8	999	(Italy) Salvatore de Plano	3–7
Becker Motorsport	Dallara SN01	AER P57 3.4 L V6	411	(Germany) Karl-Heinz Becker	2–7
Jenzer Motorsport	Dallara SN01	AER P57 3.4 L V6	430	(Switzerland) Martin Kindler	3, 7
Team Ledermair Motorsport	Dallara GP2/08	Mecachrome V8108 4.0 L V8	444	(Austria) Johann Ledermair	1–3, 5–7
Inter Europol Competition	Dallara GP2/05	Mecachrome V8108 4.0 L V8	505	(Germany) Walter Steding	1, 4–7
Top Speed	Dallara GP2/08	Mecachrome V8108 4.0 L V8	888	(Germany) Florian Schnitzenbaumer	1–3, 6–7

== Calendar ==
Round		Circuit	Date	Pole position	Fastest lap	Winning driver	Winning team	Formula Class Winner
1	R1	(Germany) Hockenheimring, Hockenheim	22 April	(Austria) Ingo Gerstl	(Germany) Andreas Fiedler	(Austria) Ingo Gerstl	(Austria) Top Speed	(Germany) Andreas Fiedler
1	R2	(Germany) Hockenheimring, Hockenheim	23 April		(Austria) Ingo Gerstl	(Austria) Ingo Gerstl	(Austria) Top Speed	(Austria) Johann Ledermair
2	R3	(Netherlands) Circuit Park Zandvoort, Zandvoort	20 May	(Netherlands) Rinus van Kalmthout	(Austria) Johann Ledermair	(Austria) Johann Ledermair	(Austria) Team Ledermair Motorsport	(Austria) Johann Ledermair
2	R4	(Netherlands) Circuit Park Zandvoort, Zandvoort	21 May		(Austria) Johann Ledermair	(Austria) Johann Ledermair	(Austria) Team Ledermair Motorsport	(Austria) Johann Ledermair
3	R5	(France) Circuit Paul Ricard, Le Castellet	10 June	(Austria) Ingo Gerstl	(Austria) Ingo Gerstl	(Austria) Ingo Gerstl	(Austria) Top Speed	(Austria) Johann Ledermair
3	R6	(France) Circuit Paul Ricard, Le Castellet	11 June		(Austria) Ingo Gerstl	(Austria) Ingo Gerstl	(Austria) Top Speed	(Austria) Johann Ledermair
4	R7	(Belgium) Circuit Zolder, Heusden-Zolder	15 July	(Netherlands) Klaas Zwart	(Netherlands) Klaas Zwart	(India) Mahaveer Raghunathan	(Italy) PS Racing	(India) Mahaveer Raghunathan
4	R8	(Belgium) Circuit Zolder, Heusden-Zolder	16 July		(Netherlands) Klaas Zwart	(United States) Phil Stratford	(United States) Penn Elcom Racing	(Italy) Salvatore de Plano
5	R9	(Netherlands) TT Circuit Assen, Assen	5 August	(Austria) Ingo Gerstl	(Austria) Johann Ledermair	(Austria) Johann Ledermair	(Austria) Ledermair Motorsport	(Austria) Johann Ledermair
5	R10	(Netherlands) TT Circuit Assen, Assen	6 August		(Austria) Ingo Gerstl	(Austria) Ingo Gerstl	(Austria) Top Speed	(Austria) Johann Ledermair
6	R11	(Czech Republic) Masaryk Circuit, Brno	9 September	(Austria) Ingo Gerstl	(Austria) Ingo Gerstl	(Austria) Ingo Gerstl	(Austria) Top Speed	(Austria) Johann Ledermair
6	R12	(Czech Republic) Masaryk Circuit, Brno	10 September		(Austria) Ingo Gerstl	(Austria) Ingo Gerstl	(Austria) Top Speed	(Austria) Johann Ledermair
7	R13	(Italy) Autodromo Enzo e Dino Ferrari, Imola	30 September	(Austria) Ingo Gerstl	(Austria) Ingo Gerstl	(Austria) Ingo Gerstl	(Austria) Top Speed	(India) Mahaveer Raghunathan
7	R14	(Italy) Autodromo Enzo e Dino Ferrari, Imola	1 October		(Netherlands) Rinus van Kalmthout	(Netherlands) Rinus van Kalmthout	(United Kingdom) Mansell Motorsport	(India) Mahaveer Raghunathan

== Championship standings ==
- Points for both championships were awarded as follows:

Race
Position	1st	2nd	3rd	4th	5th	6th	7th	8th	9th	10th	11th	12th	13th	14th	15th	16th	17th
All Races	25	22	20	18	16	14	12	10	9	8	7	6	5	4	3	2	1

=== Drivers Standings ===
Pos	Driver	HOC (Germany)		ZAN (Netherlands)		LEC (France)		ZOL (Belgium)		ASS (Netherlands)		BRN (Czech Republic)		IMO (Italy)		Points
Open Class
1	(Austria) Ingo Gerstl	1	1			1	1			DNS	1	1	1	1	DNS	200
2	(Netherlands) Rinus van Kalmthout			2	Ret	2	2							2	1	116
3	(United States) Phil Stratford	4	3					Ret	1					5	3	111
4	(Germany) Wolfgang Jaksch	DNS	5			7	4			5	9	Ret	DNS			107
5	(Netherlands) Klaas Zwart	Ret	DNS					4†	Ret	DNS	DNS					25
6	(Austria) Bernd Herndlhofer	DNS	DNS									2	DNS			22
7	(Netherlands) Marijn van Kalmthout			11	Ret											22
8	(France) Patrick D'Aubreby					15	Ret									18
	(Austria) Peter Milavec	DNS	DNS													
Formula Class
1	(India) Mahaveer Raghunathan	5	6	3	2	5	6	1	3	2	4	5	11	3	2	263
2	(Austria) Johann Ledermair	3	2	1	1	3	3			1	2	3	2	DNS	DNS	247
3	(Italy) Salvatore de Plano	7	7	4	3	8	5	2	2	4	3	4	3	4	Ret	243
4	(Italy) Armando Mangini	DNS	DNS	DNS	DNS	10	10	3	4	6	7	6	5	6	6	168
5	(Germany) Florian Schnitzenbaumer	6	4	8	5	4	Ret					Ret	4	Ret	4	132
6	(Germany) Karl-Heinz Becker			9	10	Ret	DNS	5	5	10	Ret	Ret	7	10	7	105
7	(Switzerland) Christian Eicke	DNS	9	10	8	12	11			11	11	8	9			93
8	(Germany) Walter Steding	DNS	DNS					6	WD	7	6	7	8	7	DSQ	74
9	(Monaco) Marc Faggionato			5	4					3	5					74
10	(Netherlands) Henk de Boer			6	6	11	9	Ret	WD			9	DNS			66
11	(Switzerland) Peter Göllner			7	7	Ret	Ret			9	8	Ret	6			64
12	(Switzerland) Martin Kindler					13	12							9	5	51
13	(Germany) Wolfgang Jordan					9	8	Ret	Ret	13	12					46
14	(Czech Republic) Veronika Cicha	DNS	10			16	Ret			8	Ret	Ret	10			39
15	(France) David Moretti					6	7									36
16	(Netherlands) René Kouwenberg													8	8	30
17	(France) 'Peter'	DNS	DSQ	Ret	9					12	10			Ret	DNS	26
18	(Switzerland) Nicolas Matile													11	9	22
19	(Germany) Andreas Fiedler	2^{1}	8									Ret	Ret			16
20	(France) Bruno Navarrete					14	13									15

^{1} Andreas Fielder lost the points earned for winning the Formula Class in the first Hockenheim race for using incorrect tires. He was however still credited with the win.
