= 1937 Masaryk Grand Prix =

Race details
- Date: 26 September 1937
- Official name: VII Masarykuv Okruh
- Location: Masaryk Circuit, Brno
- Course: Permanent racing facility
- Course length: 29.140 km (18.107 miles)
- Distance: 15 laps, 437.1 km (271.6 miles)

Pole position
| Driver | (Italy) Tazio Nuvolari | Alfa Romeo |
- Grid positions set by ballot

Fastest lap
| Driver | (Germany) Rudolf Caracciola | Mercedes-Benz |
- Time: 11:59.3

Podium
| First | (Germany) Rudolf Caracciola | Mercedes-Benz |
| Second | (Germany) Manfred von Brauchitsch | Mercedes-Benz |
| Third | (Germany) Hermann Paul Müller; (Germany) Bernd Rosemeyer | Auto Union |

The 1937 Masaryk Grand Prix was a 750 kg Formula race held on 26 September 1937 at the Masaryk Circuit.

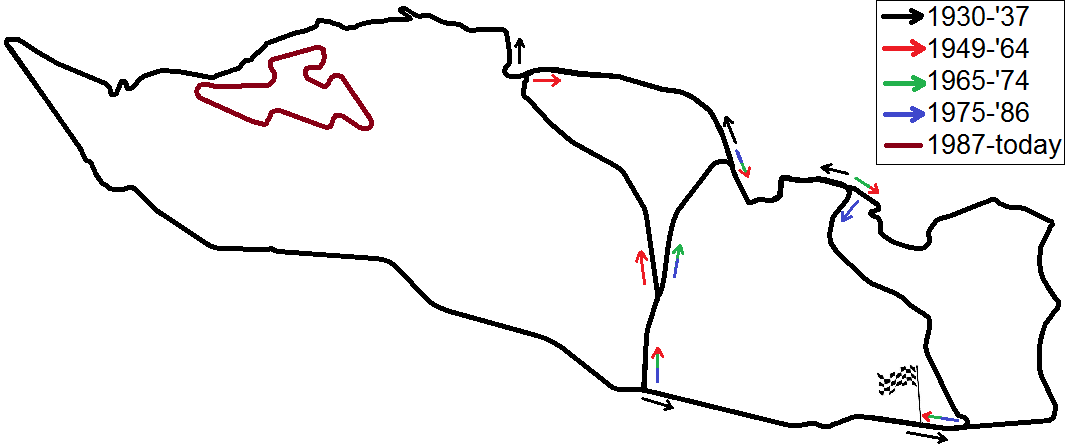
All layouts of the Masaryk Circuit (Brno Circuit) between 1930 and today combined

== Race report ==
Rudolf Hasse and Achille Varzi did not race due to illness. Rosemeyer took the Auto Union into an early lead and von Brauchitsch couldn't match his skill on the gravel surface as he pulled away from the field. On lap five Lang lost control of his Mercedes and left the road and ploughed into some bystanders, killing two and injuring twelve. Unable to catch Rosemeyer von Brauchitsch let Caracciola past and the latter began catching the young Auto Union driver. In the end though it was unnecessary to pass him, Rosemeyer's brakes gave out and his race was over...or maybe not.

Müller had been in second place, but couldn't keep the Mercedes' behind and both Seaman and von Brauchitsch caught and passed him and he dropped to fourth. Back in the pits Rosemeyer took over Müller's car and immediately set about catching the now cruising Mercedes' drivers. Seaman was 48s ahead at the beginning of the final 29 km lap, Rosemeyer finished the lap 37s ahead of him! Von Brauchitsch was only another 5s ahead when they took the flag and Rosemeyer had an incredible 3rd place whilst Caracciola had the win.

== Classification ==
| Pos | No | Driver | Team | Laps | Time/Retired | Grid | Points |
|---|---|---|---|---|---|---|---|
| 1 | 2 | (Germany) Rudolf Caracciola | Mercedes-Benz | 15 | 3:09:25.3 | 8 | |
| 2 | 4 | (Germany) Manfred von Brauchitsch | Mercedes-Benz | 15 | + 36.4 | 5 | |
| 3 | 12 | (Germany) Hermann Paul Müller/Bernd Rosemeyer | Auto Union | 15 | + 41.1 | 6 | |
| 4 | 6 | (United Kingdom) Richard Seaman | Mercedes-Benz | 15 | + 1'18.5 | 7 | |
| 5 | 18 | (Italy) Tazio Nuvolari | Alfa Romeo | 14 | + 1 lap | 1 | |
| 6 | 20 | (Italy) Antonio Brivio | Alfa Romeo | 14 | + 1 lap | 4 | |
| 7 | – | (Hungary) László Hartmann | Maserati | 13 | + 2 laps | 9 | |
| 8 | – | (Hungary) Erno Festetics | Maserati | 12 | + 3 laps | 10 | |
| DNF | – | (Germany) Paul Pietsch | Maserati | – | Crash | 12 | |
| DNF | – | (Italy) Luigi Soffietti | Maserati | – | – | 13 | |
| DNF | 10 | (Germany) Bernd Rosemeyer | Auto Union | 8 | Brakes | 3 | |
| DNF | 8 | (Germany) Hermann Lang | Mercedes-Benz | 5 | Crash | 2 | |
| DNF | 28 | (Italy) Renato Balestrero | Alfa Romeo | – | – | 11 | |

Grand Prix Race
1937 Grand Prix season
| Previous race: 1935 Masaryk Grand Prix | Czechoslovakian Grand Prix | Next race: 1949 Czechoslovakian Grand Prix |
