= Otakar Bittmann =

Czech medical doctor and resistance activist

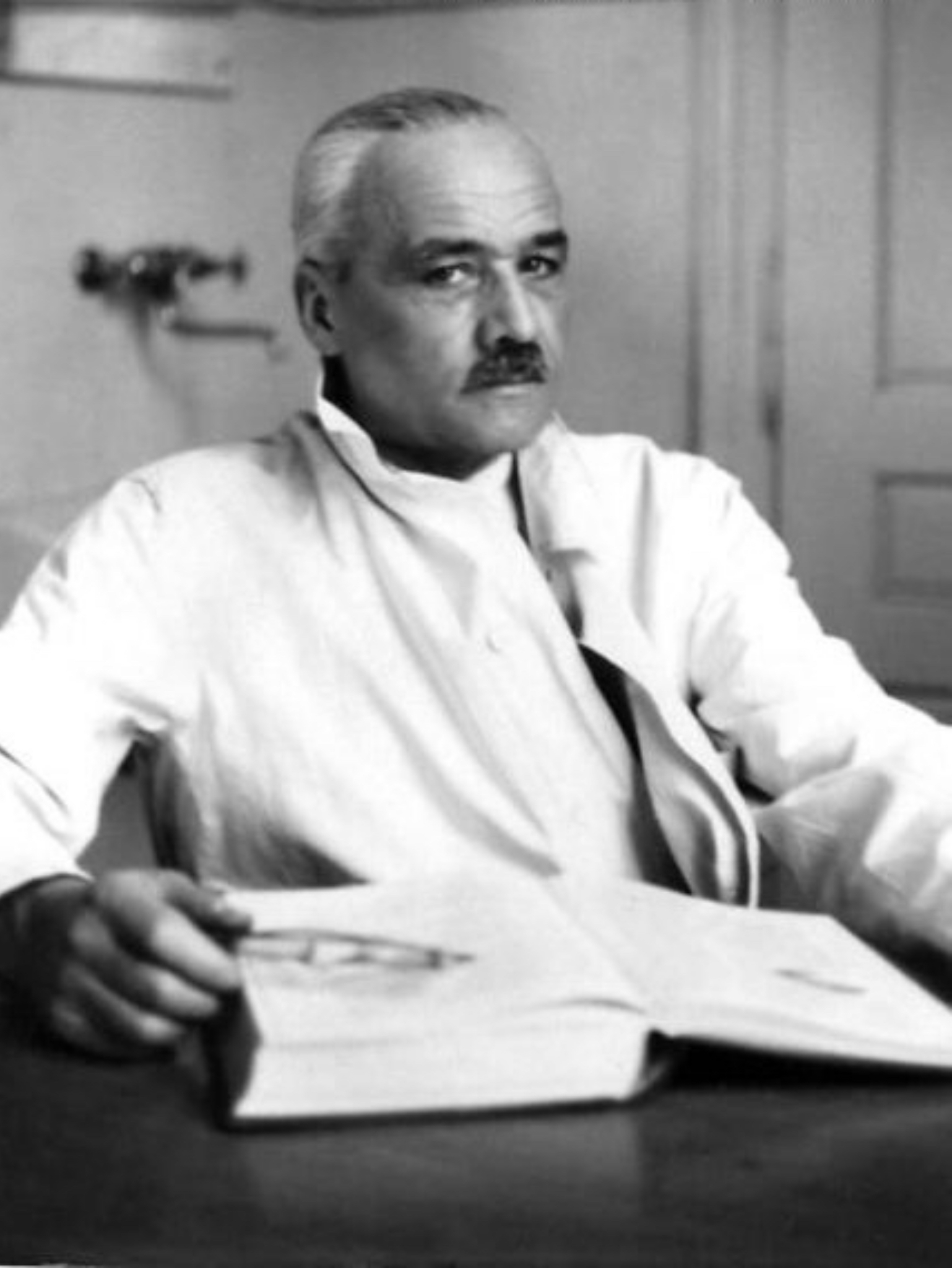
- Bittmann in 1936
- Born: 27 May 1891; Prague, Bohemia, Austria-Hungary
- Died: 13 September 1945 (aged 54); Olomouc, Czechoslovakia
- Citizenship: Czechoslovak
- Education: Medical doctor, gynaecologist-obstetrician, researcher
- Occupations: Medical doctor, professor, racing driver, resistance member

Otakar Bittmann (27 May 1891 – 13 September 1945) was a Czech gynaecologist-obstetrician, resistance fighter, professor at Masaryk University in Brno, and racing driver. A member of the resistance during the German occupation, he used his position at the hospital to shield Jewish women from Nazi persecution. Arrested without charge by the new communist authorities in July 1945, he died two months later of a heart attack. In 1948 he was posthumously honoured by General Ludvík Svoboda, then Minister of Defence, in recognition of his role in the resistance.

== Early life ==
Otakar Bittmann was born on 27 May 1891 in Prague. Baptised on 7 June 1891 in the Catholic church of Kostelec u Křížků, he was the eldest son of Václav Bittmann, an accountant from a farming family who nurtured ambitions of social advancement for his son through education.

Bittmann attended secondary school in Benešov. After completing his baccalaureate in 1910, he enrolled at the Faculty of Medicine of Charles-Ferdinand University in Prague, earning his medical degree in 1915, in the midst of the First World War.

== Early career ==
Bittmann was mobilised as a military physician with the 24th Infantry Regiment of the Austro-Hungarian territorial army. He served first on the Serbian front, then on the Russian front, where he practised emergency surgery in field hospitals.

In 1917, medical leave allowed him to join — of his own accord — the 2nd Gynaecological Clinic in Vienna, headed by Ernst Wertheim.

At the end of the war, Bittmann joined the surgical clinic of Otakar Kukula in Prague, where he published his first scientific work stemming from that practice.

Confronted during the war with the deaths of many soldiers he could not save, and conversely with the births of children he helped bring into the world in combat zones, Bittmann said he was marked for life by this constant tension between death and life.

On 8 May 1918, while serving as chief medical officer of the 24th Rifle Regiment, he married Viktorie Honsová, widow of Sub-Lieutenant Gustav Greif (45th Infantry Regiment), who had died in Bosnia in 1913. The wedding took place at St Nicholas Church in Prague-Vršovice.

== Career ==
After the war, between 1918 and 1921, Bittmann worked at the clinic of Professor Rubeska in Prague, one of the founders of modern obstetrics and gynaecology in Czechoslovakia. He served there as an assistant between 1919 and 1921.

The Bittmanns left Prague to settle in Brno, where Bittmann seized the opportunity offered by the founding of a new Czech university, established in January 1919 as Masaryk University on the initiative of Ostrčil. As Ostrčil's first assistant at the head of the obstetric-gynaecological clinic, he took an active part in setting it up, organising it, and running it, demonstrating genuine managerial ability.

His son Otakar was born in 1920, followed by his daughter Dagmar in 1922. That same year, Bittmann submitted a habilitation thesis entitled Příspěvek k diagnose ektopických gravidit ("A Contribution to the Diagnosis of Ectopic Pregnancies"). He was appointed associate professor of obstetrics and gynaecology the following year.

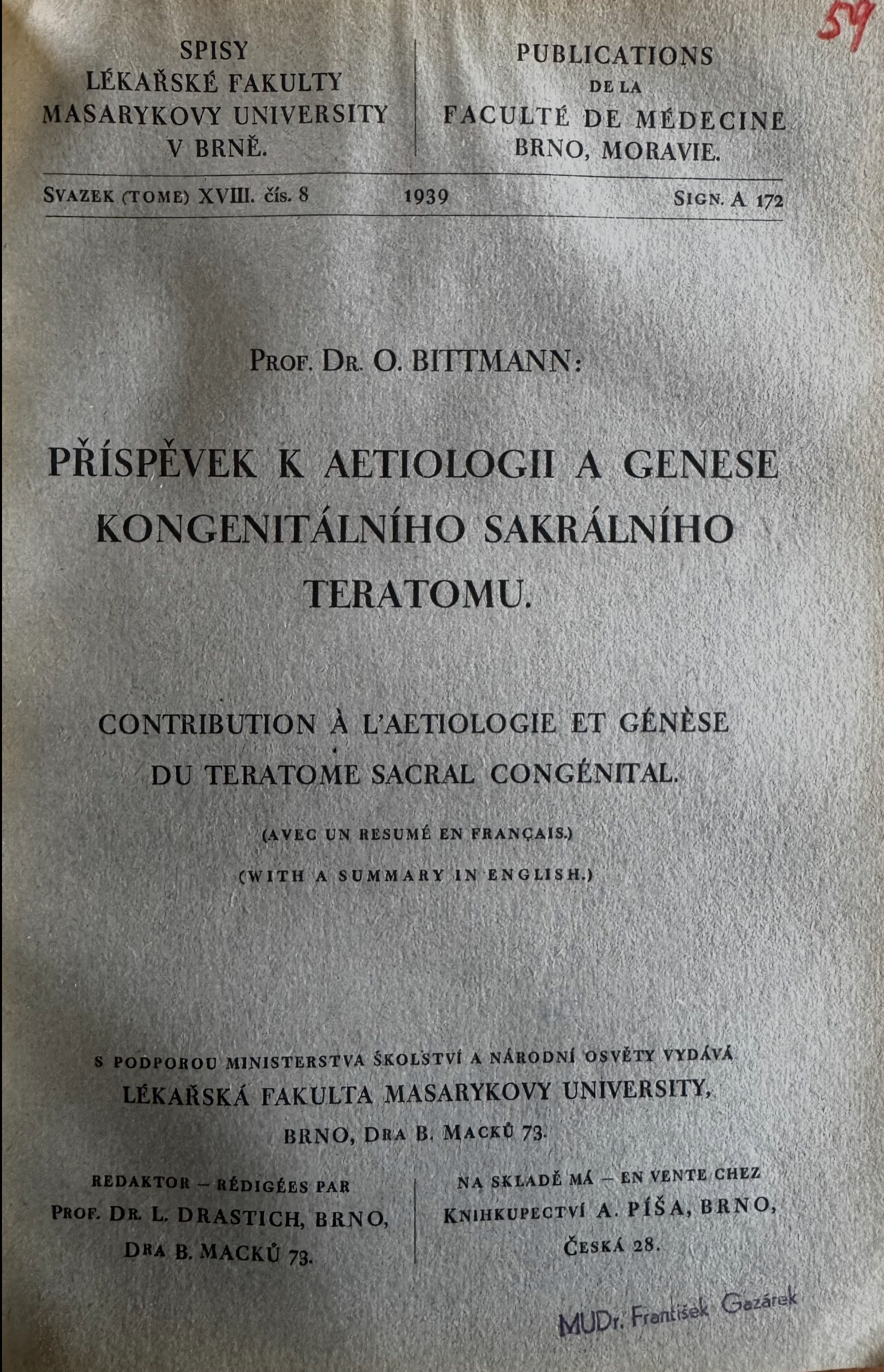
Publication by Bittmann on teratomas

In 1924 he furthered his training at clinics in Italy, Germany, and Austria, then returned to Brno to continue his work at Masaryk University. He combined academic and clinical activity, notably founding a clinic on Žlutý kopec hill in 1926.

His surgical expertise was rooted in his wartime military practice. His scientific work, particularly on teratomas, earned him recognition beyond national borders and is referenced in the Biographical Dictionary of the Czech Lands.

== Motor racing ==
In the late 1920s, Bittmann took up motor racing. In 1928 he made his competitive debut at the Soběšice hillclimb, where he won the sports car category over 2 litres driving an Austro-Daimler, and finished second in the racing car category under 1.5 litres.

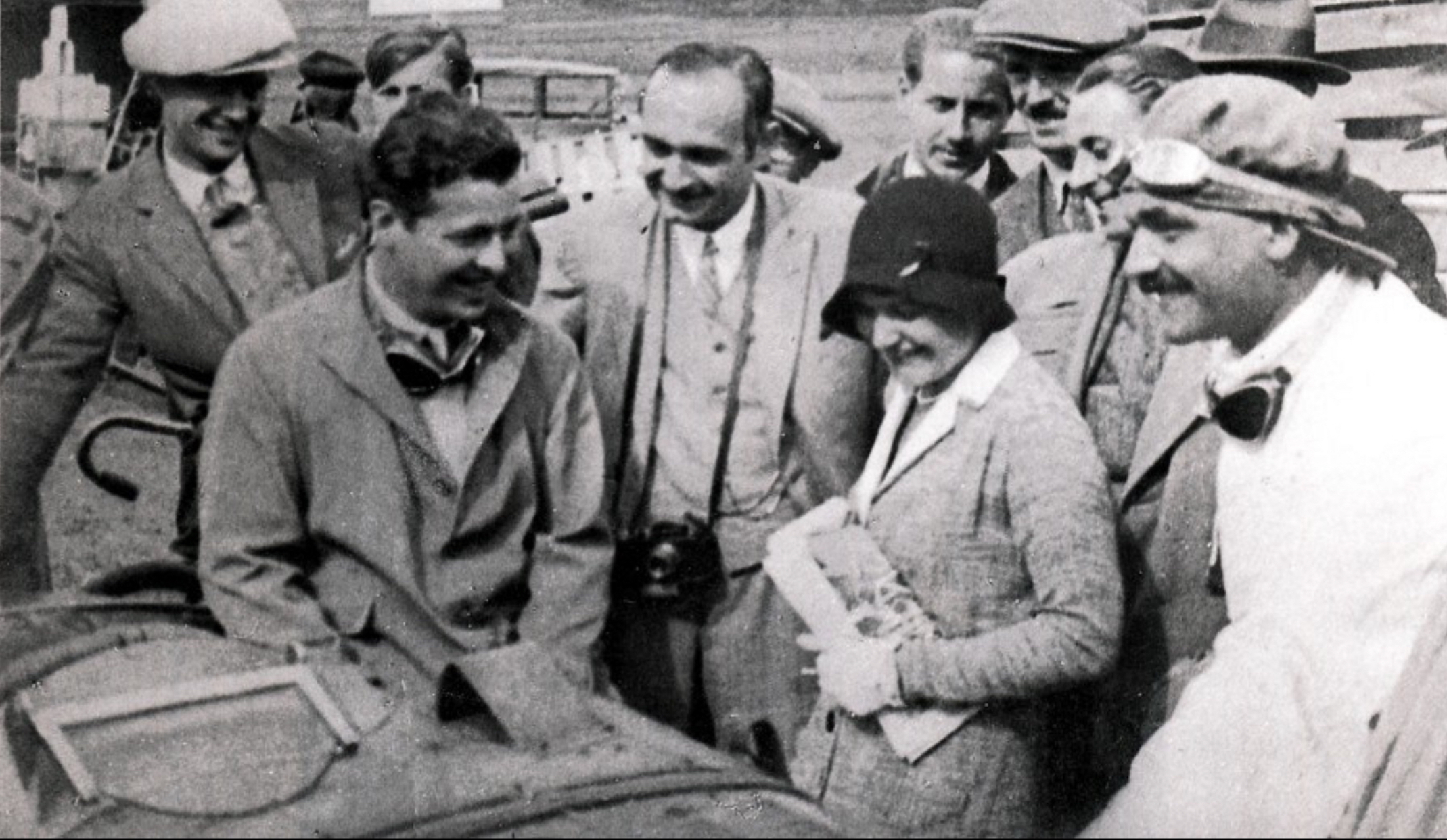
Otakar Bittmann (right) at a race in 1928

That same year, he entered the German Grand Prix at the Nürburgring, but withdrew following the fatal accident of his compatriot Čeněk Junek. In 1929, Bittmann took part in the Targa Florio in Sicily, a race renowned for its difficulty. He finished in 12th place despite gruelling conditions.

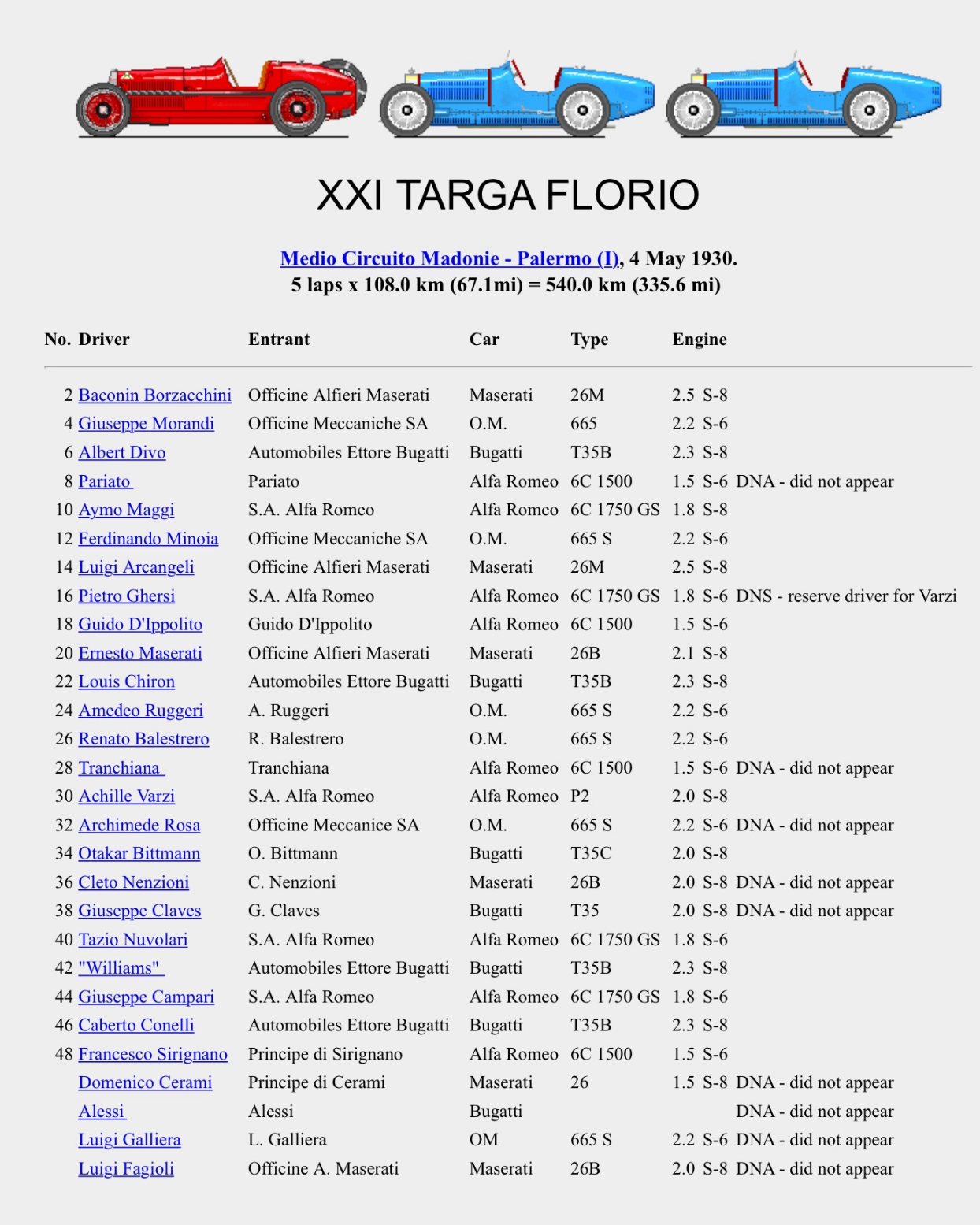
Bittmann alongside Louis Chiron at the Targa Florio

In 1930 he competed in the Targa Florio again, finishing the race despite rolling his car twice along the way. In that edition he raced alongside legendary drivers such as Louis Chiron, who finished second, Achille Varzi, the race winner, and Tazio Nuvolari, who placed fifth. That same year, Bittmann was one of the founders of the Masaryk Circuit in Brno. He took part in the first race held on the circuit on 28 September 1930. Unfortunately, on the tenth lap his Bugatti caught fire after a pit stop, forcing him to retire.

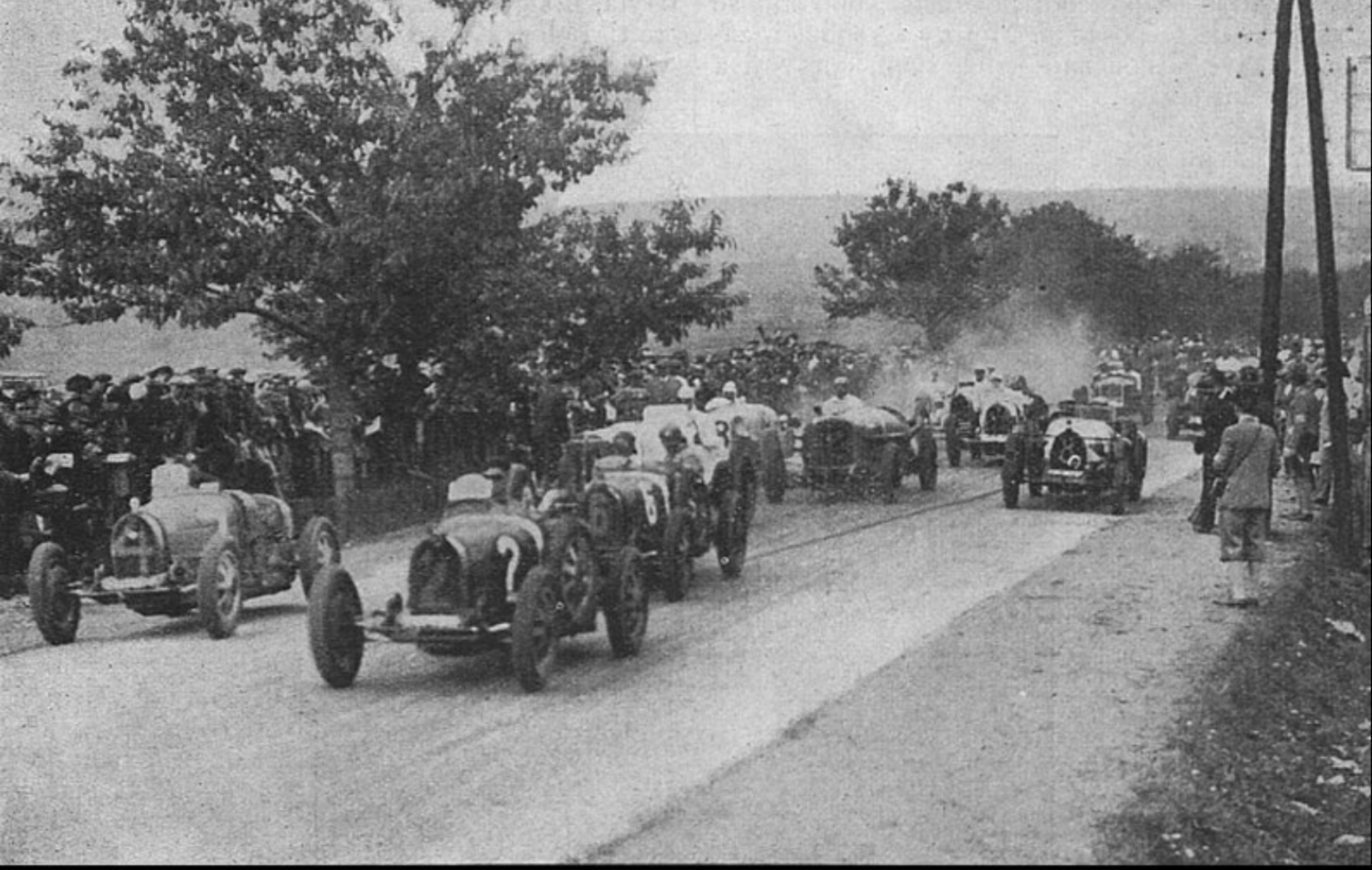
Bittmann on the Masaryk Circuit in 1930

After this incident, Bittmann ended his racing career. He continued nonetheless to support motorsport, notably by sponsoring a prize in memory of Čeněk Junek at subsequent editions of the Czechoslovak Grand Prix.

== Resistance ==
The German occupation confronted Bittmann with new challenges. He was sought out by the wives of Nazi dignitaries, including Johanna Morell, wife of Hitler's personal physician, Theodor Morell. After treating Johanna for severe bleeding, his reputation grew, which allowed him to use his standing to help resistance members and Jewish patients.

Lieutenant-Colonel Alois Petráš testified that in September 1944, Bittmann facilitated communication with his wife, who had been arrested by the Gestapo, and passed on crucial information to him. He also provided medical assistance to Petráš's son Miloš, who was being intensively sought by the authorities, and offered to treat him at his secret hideout.

Working with partisan groups, Bittmann helped protect Jewish patients. Oldřich Šípek reported that Bittmann would admit them to the hospital whenever necessary, using pre-filled admission forms. He also protected young women born in 1924 from forced labour in the Reich.

A notable example is that of Růžena (Rosa) Hrbková, née Aschkenesová, whose mother and sisters had been murdered in concentration camps. After receiving a summons to report to the Hagibor assembly point in Prague, she did not comply, citing responsibility for her three children. Two weeks later, a new summons included her children as well. Bittmann then issued her a certificate of hospitalisation, dated 22 December 1944, attesting to her medical condition. On 5 March 1945, Rosa received a summons to appear at Gestapo headquarters in Olomouc. Bittmann immediately admitted her to his ward, and a note in German was added to the summons stating that she was in hospital for uterine bleeding.

The testimony of Leo Hrbek, her husband, recounts that the Gestapo from Prague came to the hospital, but Bittmann firmly refused to hand over his patients, insisting they were unfit to be moved. His sister Lucy, then eleven years old, witnessed the event and recalled Bittmann's determination to protect his patients.

On 22 March 1945, less than three weeks before liberation, the lawyer JUDr. Leopold Pospíšil, a colleague of Bittmann, wrote in his diary that the Jews would be left in peace, after receiving a reassuring telegram from the Gestapo.

== Arrest and death ==
Bittmann survived the war but was broken by his detention after liberation. A letter sent to the Regional Police Institutes Directorate in Olomouc records his arrest, which took place on 24 July 1945, and the subsequent legal proceedings. Notably, Vladimír Vašek was appointed on the very day of Bittmann's arrest by the Regional National Committee as chief physician of the Olomouc maternity ward, replacing Bittmann. The following day, he was named head of department — a sequence that suggests a prepared action.

R. Straková also wrote a letter to Karel Vrba in Přerov about Bittmann's arrest and Vašek's arrival:

Dear colleague, I must tell you some big news at once. Yesterday, at 10 p.m., police officers came to collect the professor by car — an hour later they telephoned to say he was in pre-trial detention and that we needed to make arrangements accordingly. He came back that same evening to collect some necessary things, then had to leave again. Today we already have a new head here, who arrived the same day — Dr Vašek, the new head of department...

The following day, 26 July 1945, senior figures at Olomouc hospital submitted a request to the Regional National Committee to learn the reasons for Bittmann's arrest and to expedite proceedings in the matter. The request went unanswered.

On 3 October 1945, following Bittmann's death, they addressed an appeal to the "distinguished faculty of medicine of Masaryk University" in support of their request, concluding with the following statement:

Professor Bittmann was imprisoned for nearly four weeks without any judicial investigation and died on 13 September of a heart attack on his way to the railway station. The heads of the regional medical institutes therefore request that, now that Professor Bittmann has died, and given that our colleague was never subjected to a judicial investigation during his police detention, we be informed of the reasons for his arrest at the time, as we are convinced that Bittmann was neither a traitor nor a collaborator, and as his colleagues we remain determined to see the accusations that led to his arrest refuted.

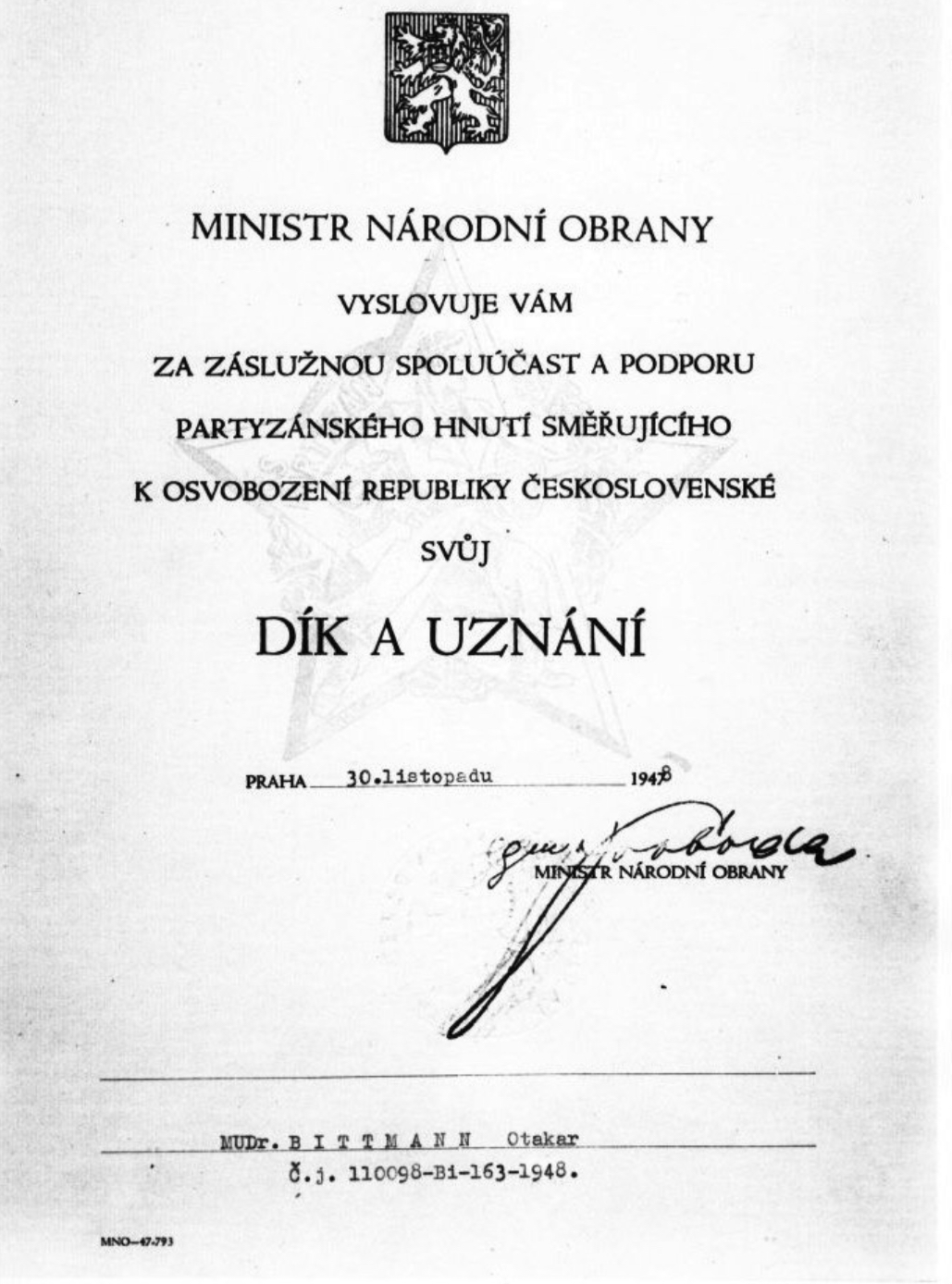
Tribute and gratitude of the nation to Bittmann

They went on to ask their colleagues in Brno to support their call for a full investigation into the matter and for Bittmann's name to be cleared. The document was signed by doctors Vejdovský, Pavlica, Stratil, Rapant, Mores, Pavlík, Šalša, Lédl, and Amerling.

Owing to the harsh conditions of his detention, Bittmann died two months after his release, on 13 September 1945, of a myocardial infarction.

In November 1948, the then Minister of Defence, General Ludvík Svoboda, paid tribute with the gratitude of the nation to Bittmann for his support of the resistance.
