= Yamaha AS1 =

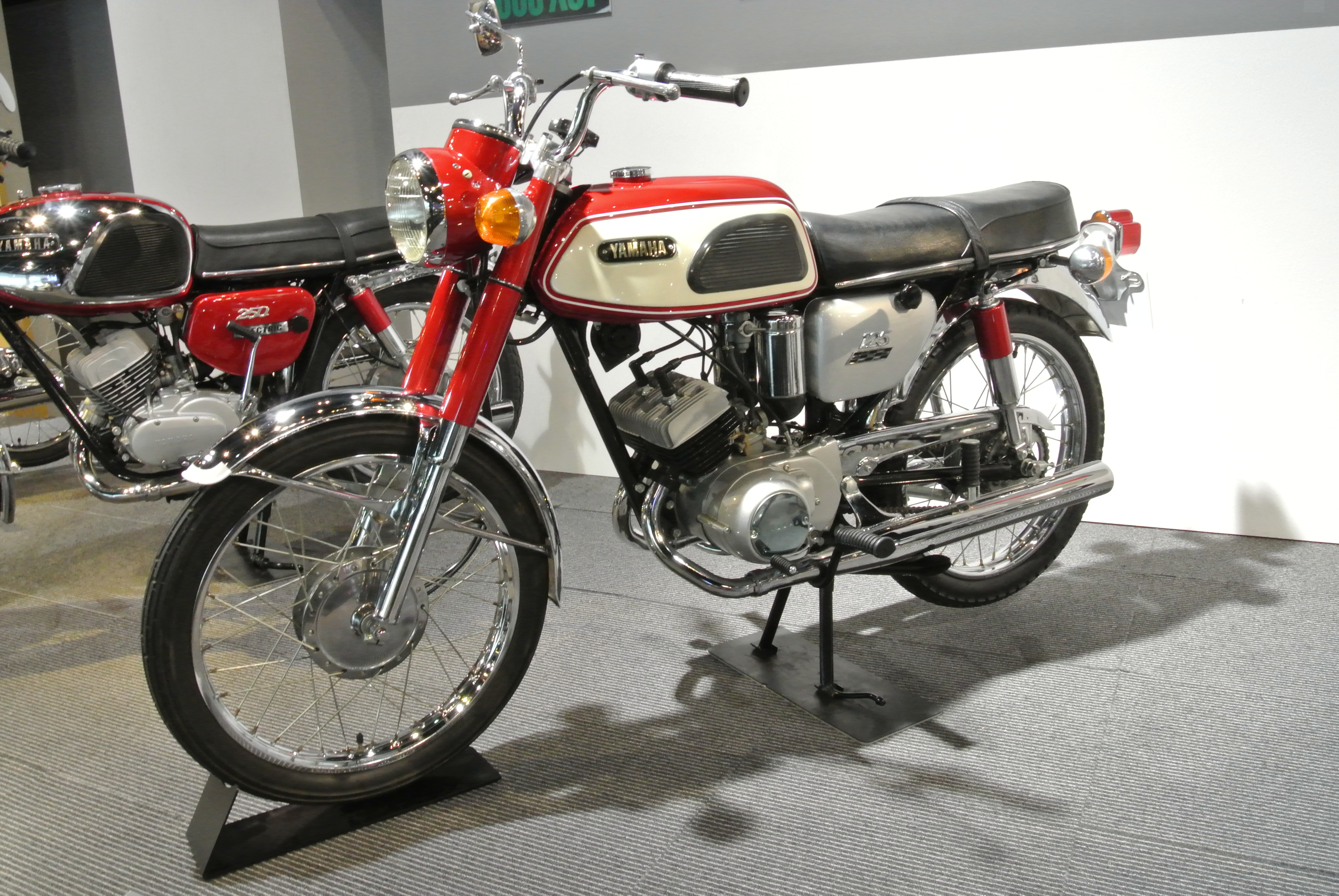
- Manufacturer: Yamaha
- Production: 1967–1970
- Class: Sport touring (road version); 125cc (racing version)
- Engine: 2-stroke, air-cooled, I2
- Top speed: 75 mph (121 km/h)
- Power: 15 hp (11 kW) @ 8500 rpm
- Torque: 9.4 lb⋅ft (13 N⋅m) @ 8000 rpm
- Transmission: 5-speed, chain final drive
- Frame type: Steel tube frame
- Suspension: Telescopic forks (front); swing arm with twin spring/shock absorbers (rear)
- Brakes: Expanding drum brake, single leading shoe (front); Expanding drum brake (rear)
- Wheelbase: 1,072 mm (42.2 in)
- Dimensions: L: 1,854 mm (73.0 in); W: 671 mm (26.4 in); H: 1,011 mm (39.8 in)
- Fuel capacity: 2.5 US gal (9.5 L)

Yamaha AS1 is a 125 cc two-stroke air-cooled motorcycle produced by Yamaha, between 1967 and 1970.
