= Tatra 602 =

The Tatra 602 Tatraplan Sport is a racing car produced by Tatra in 1949.

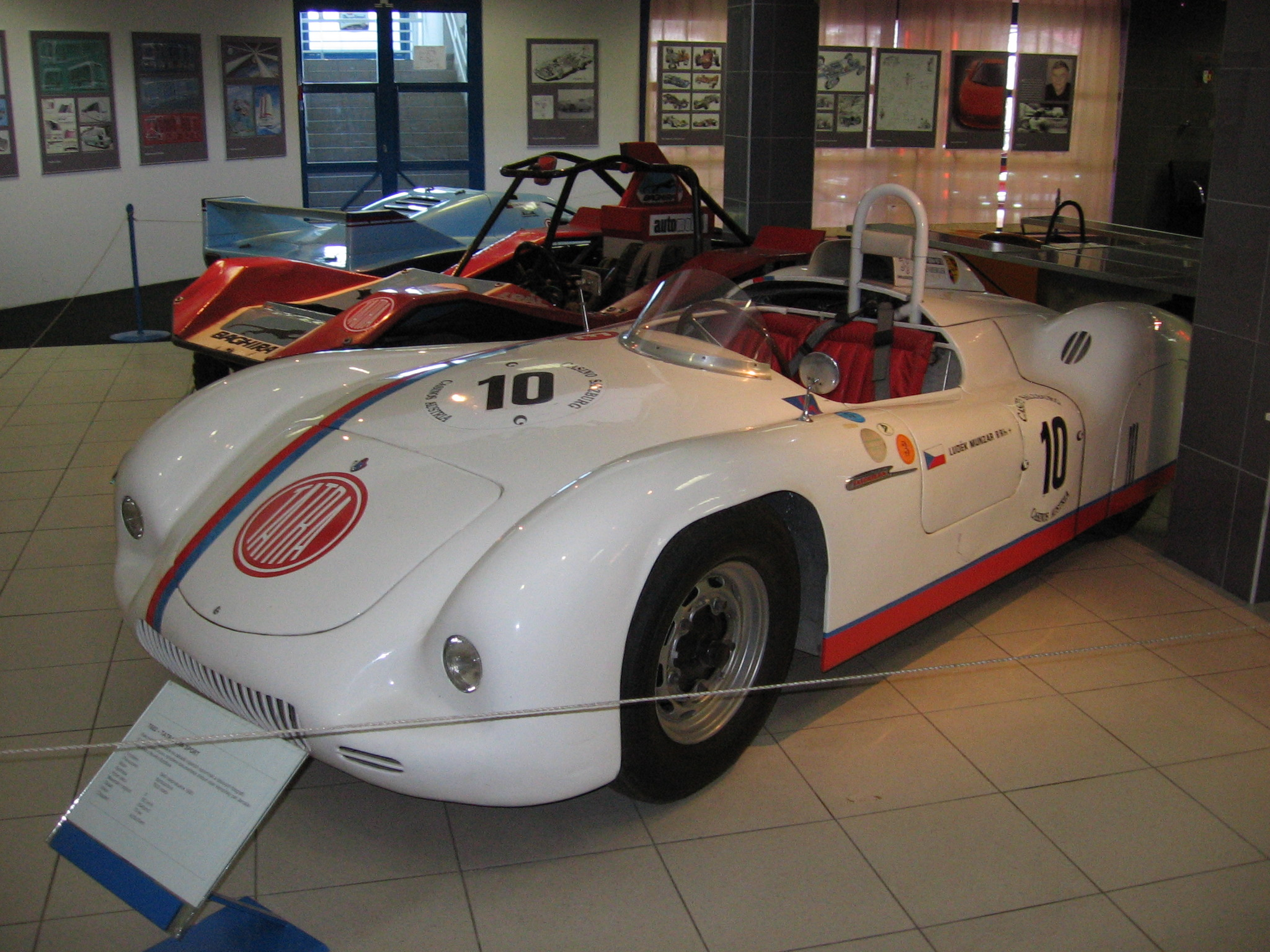
Tatra 602 Tatraplan-sport

== Tatra 602 ==
The Tatra 602 was manufactured by Tatra based on the 600, built in 1949. The T602 Tatraplan-Sport was prepared by the Czech coachbuilder Sodomka. The 602 was a two-door sports car with possibly only two units built. The body is constructed from a lattice structure of steel tubes over which lightweight duralumin bodywork is placed. The car was powered by a mid-engine 1.9L 4-cylinder engine with four carburetors producing around 63 kW (84 hp). Power was sent to the rear wheels through a 3-speed manual transmission.

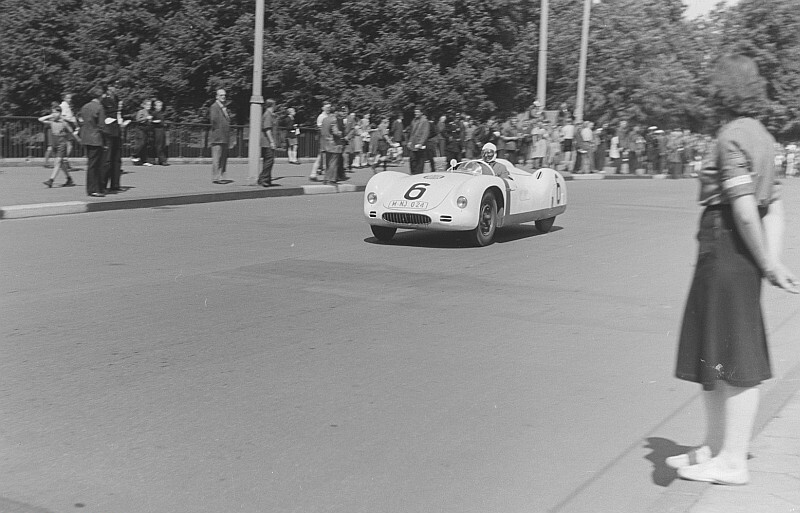
The 602 racing

The Tatra 602 was driven by Bruno Sojka at Brno for the 1949 Czechoslovakia Grand Prix. The 602 proved successful and won many races from 1950 to 1952, including the Ecce Homo hill race in 1950. On September 30, 1951, the 602, with Bruno Sojka at the wheel, crashed while training for the 1951 Ecce Homo hill race, killing Sojka. Although a cause was never determined, eyewitnesses stated that Sojka was hit in the face by a large bird.

Another 602 was built in 1951 and featured a 2.5L air-cooled V8 engine (from the Tatra 603) producing around 99 kW (133 hp) connected to a 4 speed manual transmission. This 602 was destroyed in a 1953 crash while attempting a speed record, but the driver, Josef Chovanec, was thrown clear and survived. The 602 was later restored and competed in historic auto races. Unlike the original car, the 602 now has a sheet metal body. The power comes from T603, 8 cylinder, air cooled engine. The car was exhibited on display of Museum of Sport Cars in Lány, near Prague. The chassis of the first car, with 4 cylinder Tatraplan engine sits in the Tatra Factory Museum in Kopřivnice.
