= Lucchini SR1 =

Sports prototype race car

Lucchini SR1-98
- Category: SR1

Technical specifications
- Chassis: Carbon fiber and aluminum honeycomb monocoque chassis
- Suspension: Unequal length wishbones, pushrod actuated coil springs over shock absorbers, inboard rocker arms, anti-roll bars
- Length: 4,500 mm (180 in)
- Width: 1,900 mm (75 in)
- Engine: Ford-Cosworth DFV 3.6 L (219.7 cu in) 90° DOHC V8 naturally-aspirated mid-engined
- Transmission: Hewland NMT 6-speed sequential manual
- Power: ~ 500 hp (370 kW)
- Weight: 720 kg (1,590 lb)

Competition history
- Debut: 1998 International Sports Racing Series Donington

The Lucchini SR1-98 is a series of sports prototype race cars, designed, developed, and built by Italian manufacturer Lucchini Engineering, for sports car racing, conforming to the FIA's SR1 class, and produced in 1998.
