= Brno 2 Hours 30 Minutes =

- Venue: Brno Circuit
- First race: 1988; 38 years ago
- Last race: 2002; 24 years ago
- Duration: 2 hours 30 minutes
- Most wins (driver): no repeat winners
- Most wins (team): JMB Giesse Ferrari (2)
- Most wins (manufacturer): Ferrari (2); Dome (2)

The Brno 2 Hours 30 Minutes was a sports car endurance race held at the Brno Circuit in Brno, Czech Republic. The race was first held in 1988 as a round of the World Sportscar Championship. It was revived in 1997 for the International Sports Racing Series, and continued until 2002 under the FIA Sportscar Championship. It has since been absorbed into the 24H Series, which in 2015 organised the Hankook 12 Hours Epilog of Brno, and in 2016 the Hankook 24 Hours Epilog of Brno. This was the first ever 24 hours endurance race in the Czech Republic.

== Results ==
Year	Date	Overall winner(s)	Entrant	Car	Distance/Duration	Race title	Series	Report
1988	10 July	(West Germany) Jochen Mass (France) Jean-Louis Schlesser	(Switzerland) Team Sauber Mercedes	Sauber-Mercedes C9/88	360 km (220 mi)	Grand Prix ČSSR	World Sportscar Championship	report
1989–1996: Not held
1997	14 September	(Italy) Arturo Merzario	(Italy) Symbol Team	Centenari M1-Alfa Romeo	20 minutes	Masaryk Grand Prix	International Sports Racing Series	report
1998	17 May	(France) Emmanuel Collard (Italy) Vincenzo Sospiri	(France) JB Giesse Team Ferrari	Ferrari 333 SP	2 hours, 30 minutes	ISRS Brno	International Sports Racing Series	report
1999	1 August	(France) Christophe Tinseau (France) Jean-Marc Gounon	(France) DAMS	Lola B98/10-Judd	2 hours, 30 minutes	SportsRacing World Cup Brno	Sports Racing World Cup	report
2000	6 August	(France) David Terrien (Italy) Christian Pescatori	(France) JMB Giesse Ferrari	Ferrari 333 SP	2 hours, 30 minutes	SportsRacing World Cup Brno	Sports Racing World Cup	report
2001	1 July	(Denmark) John Nielsen (Japan) Hiroki Katoh	(Denmark) Den Blå Avis	Dome S101-Judd	2 hours, 30 minutes	FIA Sportscar Championship Brno	FIA Sportscar Championship	report
2002	18 May	(Netherlands) Val Hillebrand (Netherlands) Jan Lammers	(Netherlands) Racing for Holland	Dome S101-Judd	2 hours, 30 minutes	LG Super Racing Weekend Brno	FIA Sportscar Championship	report
