= 2026 Supercars Endurance Series =

Motorsport season in Portugal and Spain

2026 Supercars Endurance Series season
Previous: 2025	Next: 2027

The 2026 Supercars Endurance Series season is the sixth under the current name and the eighth overall. A new feature of the season is the introduction of a subcategory within the GT4 class, aimed at driver pairings consisting of one Pro and one Bronze driver.

== Calendar ==
A calendar with 6 rounds was announced on 5 December 2025.
IbS = Iberian Supercars
ScE = Supercars España
CPV = Campeonato de Portugal de Velocidade

Round	Circuit	Date	IbS	ScE	CPV	Supporting Program
1	(Portugal) Autódromo Internacional do Algarve	15–17 May	✅	✅	✅	Algarve Iberian Racing Festival; Campeonato de Portugal de Velocidade de Clássicos; Campeonato de Portugal de Velocidade 1300; Campeonato de Portugal de Velocidade Super Legends; Campeonato de Portugal de Velocidade de Legends
2	(Spain) Circuito del Jarama	5–7 June		✅		Jarama Classic; Iberian Historic Endurance; Carrera Los 80's
3	(Portugal) Circuito Internacional de Vila Real	10–12 July			✅	55° Circuito Internacional de Vila Real; TCR World Tour; Campeonato de Portugal de Velocidade de Clássicos; Campeonato de Portugal de Velocidade 1300; Campeonato de Portugal de Velocidade Super Legends; Campeonato de Portugal de Velocidade de Legends
4	(Spain) Circuito Ricardo Tormo	25–27 September	✅	✅		Valencia Iberian Racing Festival; Carrera Los 80's GTC Endurance Challenge; TCR European Endurance
5	(Spain) Circuito de Jerez	6–8 November	✅	✅	✅	Jerez Iberian Racing Festival; Iberian Historic Endurance
6	(Portugal) Circuito do Estoril	4–6 December	✅		✅	Estoril Endurance Festival; Iberian Historic Endurance; Carrera Los 80's
