= 2025 Supercars Endurance Series =

Motorsport event in Portugal and Spain

2025 Supercars Endurance Series season
Previous: 2024	Next: 2026

The 2025 SuperCars Endurance Series season is the fifth under the current name and the seventh overall. A new feature of the season is the introduction of a subcategory within the GT4 class, aimed at driver pairings consisting of one Pro and one Bronze driver.

== Teams and drivers ==
=== GT4 ===
Team	Car	No.	Drivers		Rounds
Pro
(Slovenia) Lema Racing	Mercedes-AMG GT4 (C190)	3	(Norway) Olav Vaa	(Norway) Andreas Vaa	1
(Portugal) Speedy Motorsport	Toyota GR Supra GT4 EVO2 (J29/DB)	4	(Portugal) César Machado	(Portugal) Rafael Lobato	1, 3
(Portugal) Speedy Motorsport	Toyota GR Supra GT4 EVO2 (J29/DB)	4	(Portugal) César Machado	(Spain) Adrián Ferrer	4-6
(Portugal) Speedy Motorsport	Toyota GR Supra GT4 EVO2 (J29/DB)	5	(Portugal) José Carlos Pires	(Portugal) Tomás Guedes	1-2, 4-6
(Portugal) Speedy Motorsport	Toyota GR Supra GT4 EVO2 (J29/DB)	5	(Portugal) José Carlos Pires	(Portugal) Pedro Salvador	3
(Portugal) Speedy Motorsport	Porsche 718 Cayman GT4 RS Clubsport (982)	6	(Portugal) João Aguiar-Branco	(Portugal) Bernardo Pinheiro	1-2
(Portugal) Speedy Motorsport	Porsche 718 Cayman GT4 RS Clubsport (982)	6	(Portugal) João Aguiar-Branco	(Portugal) Luís Tavares	4-6
(Spain) NM Racing Team	Mercedes-AMG GT4 Evo 2025 (C190)	10	(Switzerland) Max Huber	(Uruguay) Tomás Granzella	1-2, 4-6
Toyota GR Caetano Portugal	Toyota GR Supra GT4 EVO2 (J29/DB)	26	(Portugal) Francisco Mora	(Portugal) Francisco Abreu	All
(Portugal) Racar Motorsport	Aston Martin V8 Vantage AMR GT4 (AM6 *2019-2023*)	77	(France) Mathieu Martins	(Brazil) Roberto Faria	1-4
(Portugal) Racar Motorsport	Aston Martin V8 Vantage AMR GT4 (AM6 *2019-2023*)	77	(France) Mathieu Martins	(Portugal) Henrique V. Oliveira	5-6
(Portugal) Racar Motorsport	Aston Martin V8 Vantage AMR GT4 (AM6 *2019-2023*)	78	(Romania) Luca Savu	(Portugal) Henrique V. Oliveira	1, 3-4
(Spain) BMW Promotion Motorsport	BMW M4 GT4 EVO (G82)	81	(Spain) José M. de los Milagros	(Spain) Nerea Martí	1-2, 4-6
(Germany) CV Performance x JP Motorsport	Mercedes-AMG GT4 (C190)	85	(Sweden) Jonathan Engström	(Germany) Patrick Steinmetz	1
(Germany) CV Performance x JP Motorsport	Mercedes-AMG GT4 (C190)	85	(Sweden) Jonathan Engström	(Denmark) Louis Leveau	2, 4
(Germany) CV Performance x JP Motorsport	Mercedes-AMG GT4 (C190)	85	(Sweden) Jonathan Engström	(Germany) Jan-Niklas Stieler (NP)	5
(United Kingdom) Tockwith Motorsports	Mercedes-AMG GT4 (C190)	129	(United Kingdom) Aubrey Hall (NP)	(United Kingdom) Jemma Moore (NP)	1
Pro-Bronze
(Portugal) Araújo Competiçao	Aston Martin V8 Vantage AMR GT4 (AM6 *2024+*)	007	(Portugal) Bruno Pereira	(Portugal) Gonçalo Araújo	1, 3-4, 6
(Portugal) Batina Racing	Toyota GR Supra GT4 EVO2 (J29/DB)	16	(Portugal) Orlando Batina	(Portugal) Sérgio Azevedo	1, 3-6
(Portugal) Batina Racing	Toyota GR Supra GT4 EVO2 (J29/DB)	16	(Portugal) Orlando Batina	(Portugal) Miguel Lobo	2
(Spain) McLaren SMC Motorsport	McLaren Artura GT4	23	(Portugal) José Cautela	(Portugal) Lourenço Monteiro	1, 4-6
(Spain) NM Racing Team	Mercedes-AMG GT4 Evo 2025 (C190)	36	(Spain) Guillermo Aso	(Romania) Filip Vava	1-2, 4-6
(Portugal) Gianfranco Motorsport	Toyota GR Supra GT4 EVO2 (J29/DB)	44	(Portugal) Alexandre Areia	(Portugal) Nuno Afonso	Todas
(Slovenia) Lema Racing	Mercedes-AMG GT4 (C190)	119	(Portugal) Bruno Pires	(Slovenia) Mark Kastelic	1, 4-6
(Portugal) Veloso Motorsport	Porsche 718 Cayman GT4 RS Clubsport (982)	888	(Portugal) Patrick Cunha	(Portugal) Jorge Rodrigues	1, 5
(Portugal) Veloso Motorsport	Porsche 718 Cayman GT4 RS Clubsport (982)	888	(Portugal) Patrick Cunha	(Portugal) Bruno Pires	3
(Portugal) Veloso Motorsport	Porsche 718 Cayman GT4 RS Clubsport (982)	888	(Portugal) Patrick Cunha	(Portugal) Miguel Cristovão	4
(Portugal) Veloso Motorsport	Porsche 718 Cayman GT4 RS Clubsport (982)	888	(Portugal) Patrick Cunha	(Germany) Hendrik Still	6
Bronze
(Slovenia) Lema Racing	Mercedes-AMG GT4 (C190)	3	(Slovenia) Kyam Potez		4-5
(Portugal) GT Race Marbella by Speedy Motorsport (Portugal) Nokotech Racing by Speedy	Toyota GR Supra GT4 EVO2 (J29/DB)	8	(Lithuania) Andrius Zemaitis		1-2, 5
(Portugal) GT Race Marbella by Speedy Motorsport (Portugal) Nokotech Racing by Speedy	Toyota GR Supra GT4 EVO2 (J29/DB)	8	(Lithuania) Andrius Zemaitis	(Switzerland) Karel Staut	4
(Portugal) GT Race Marbella by Speedy Motorsport (Portugal) Nokotech Racing by Speedy	Toyota GR Supra GT4 EVO2 (J29/DB)	8	(Lithuania) Andrius Zemaitis	(United States) Hudson Schwartz	6
(Spain) McLaren SMC Motorsport	McLaren Artura GT4	11	(Spain) Álvaro Lobera	(Spain) Gonzalo de Andrés	1, 4-6
(Spain) GT Corse	BMW M4 GT4 Evo	24	(Spain) Manuel Bertolín (NP)		4
(Portugal) Veloso Motorsport	Porsche 718 Cayman GT4 RS Clubsport (982)	38	(Portugal) Paulo Macedo	(Portugal) Luís Calheiros	1, 3-6
(Spain) Autoworks Motorsport	BMW M4 GT4 EVO 2021 (F82)	40	(Spain) Borja Hormigos (NP)	(Spain) Héctor Hernández (NP)	4-6
(Portugal) Gianfranco Motorsport - N Team	Toyota GR Supra GT4 EVO2 (J29/DB)	58	(Portugal) Miguel Nabais	(Portugal) André Nabais	1, 3-6
(Portugal) Araújo Competiçao	Aston Martin V8 Vantage AMR GT4 (AM6 *2024+*)	79 (28)	(Portugal) Vasco Oliveira	(Portugal) Francisco Carvalho	Todas
(Spain) NM Racing Team	Mercedes-AMG GT4 Evo 2025 (C190)	97	(Portugal) Ricardo Costa	(United Kingdom) Ian Loggie	1
(Spain) NM Racing Team	Mercedes-AMG GT4 Evo 2025 (C190)	97	(Portugal) Ricardo Costa	(Colombia) Andrés Prieto	2, 4-6
(Spain) NM Racing Team	Mercedes-AMG GT4 Evo 2025 (C190)	97	(Portugal) Ricardo Costa	(United Kingdom) Keith Gatehouse	3
Am
(Spain) Promotion Motorsport	BMW M4 GT4 EVO (G82)	19	(Andorra) JM. Smörg	(Spain) Javier Macias	1-2, 4-6
(Spain) PCR Sport	Mercedes AMG GT4	30	(Spain) Josep Parera	(Spain) Vicente Dasí	4-5
(Portugal) Araújo Competiçao	Aston Martin V8 Vantage AMR GT4 (AM6 *2019-2023*)	150	(Portugal) Álvaro Ramos	(Portugal) Alexandre Martins	1
(Portugal) Racar Motorsport	Aston Martin V8 Vantage AMR GT4 (AM6 *2019-2023*)	707	(Portugal) Filipe Videira	(Portugal) António Lopes	Todas
(Portugal) Gianfranco Motorsport	Aston Martin V8 Vantage AMR GT4 (AM6 *2019-2023*)	777	(Portugal) Rúben Vaquinhas	(Portugal) Pedro Bastos Rezende	1, 3-6

=== GTC ===
Team	Car	No.	Drivers		Rounds
GTX
(Portugal) Speedy Motorsport	Porsche 718 Cayman GT4 Clubsport (982)	2	(Portugal) Pompeu Simöes	(Portugal) Duarte Camelo	1, 3-6
(Slovenia) Lema Racing	Porsche Cayman GT4 Clubsport	15	(Spain) Miguel Gaspar	(Spain) Álvaro Fontes	4
(Slovenia) Lema Racing	Porsche Cayman GT4 Clubsport	15	(Spain) Miguel Gaspar		6
(France) Team CDRS	Ligier JS2R	9	(France) Stéphane Codet	(France) Pascal Trieux	6
(France) Team CDRS	Ligier JS2R	25	(France) Olivier López	(France) Christian Philippon	6
(France) Team CDRS	Ginetta G55	27	(France) Franck Labescat	(France) Emmanuel Gachiteguy	6
(France) Team CDRS	Ligier JS2R	29	(France) David Chiche	(France) Pierre-Alexis Lacorte	6
(France) Team CDRS	Ligier JS2R	43	(France) William Cavailhes	(France) Thomas Cavailhes	6
(Spain) McLaren SMC Motorsport	McLaren 570S GT4	22	(Spain) Alba Vázquez	(Spain) Alfonso Colomina	1-2, 4-5
(Spain) Autoworks Motorsport	BMW M4 GT4 EVO 2021 (F82)	40	(Spain) Borja Hormigos	(Spain) Héctor Hernández	1-2
(Portugal) Monteiros Competições	BMW M4 GT4 EVO 2021 (F82)	47	(Portugal) Henrique M. Oliveira	(Portugal) Ruben Silva	1-3
(Portugal) Monteiros Competições	BMW M4 GT4 EVO 2021 (F82)	47	(Portugal) Henrique M. Oliveira		4
(Portugal) Monteiros Competições	BMW M4 GT4 EVO 2021 (F82)	47	(Portugal) Henrique M. Oliveira	(United Kingdom) Chloe Grant	5-6
(Spain) McLaren SMC Motorsport	McLaren 570S GT4	70	(Spain) Alex Wendt		4, 6
(Spain) McLaren SMC Motorsport	McLaren 570S GT4	70	(Spain) Alex Wendt	(Spain) Jaime Sanchis	5
(United Kingdom) Tockwith Motorsports	Ginetta G55 GT4	125	(United Kingdom) Simon Moore	(Portugal) António Almeida	1
(United Kingdom) Tockwith Motorsports	Ginetta G55 GT4	125	(United Kingdom) Simon Moore	(United Kingdom) Thomas Roche	2-4
(United Kingdom) Tockwith Motorsports	Ginetta G55 GT4	125	(Portugal) António Almeida	(United Kingdom) Thomas Roche	5-6
(United Kingdom) Tockwith Motorsports	Ginetta G55 GT4	126	(United Kingdom) Steve Kirton	(United Kingdom) Jonathan Elsworth	1-2, 4-6
(United Kingdom) Tockwith Motorsports	Ginetta G55 GT4	128	(United Kingdom) Gracie Mitchell	(Italy) Luca Staccini	All
(Spain) Chefo Sport by Petrogold	Ligier JS2 R	111	(Spain) Máximo Varela	(Spain) Aleix Nogué	5
(Spain) Chefo Sport by Petrogold	Ligier JS2 R	133	(Spain) Ángel Santos	(Spain) Alejandro Iribas	1-2, 4-5
(Spain) Chefo Sport by Petrogold	Ligier JS2 R	133	(Spain) Ángel Santos	(Portugal) Gabriel Caçoilo	6
(Spain) Chefo Sport by Petrogold	Ligier JS2 R	164	(Portugal) Gabriel Caçoilo	(Spain) Pere Marques	4
(Spain) Chefo Sport by Petrogold	Ligier JS2 R	164	(Portugal) Gabriel Caçoilo	(Spain) Himar Acosta	5
(Belgium) HyRacing	Porsche Cayman CS	169	(Belgium) Olivier Muytjens	(France) Brice Pineau	4
(Portugal) NGT Motorsport	Aston Martin V8 Vantage GT4	700	(Portugal) Miguel Ferreira	(Portugal) Fernando Soares	1, 5-6
(Portugal) NGT Motorsport	Aston Martin V8 Vantage GT4	700	(Portugal) Miguel Ferreira		2
GT Cup
(Spain) Lan GP Racing	Porsche 911 GT3 Cup	12	(Spain) Ángel Lanchares		4
(Spain) Lan GP Racing	Porsche 911 GT3 Cup	12	(Spain) Ángel Lanchares	(Spain) Ramiro García-Pumarino	2
(Spain) Lan GP Racing	Porsche 911 GT3 Cup	12		(Spain) Ramiro García-Pumarino	5
(Portugal) Art of Speed	Porsche 911 GT3 Cup (991.I)	14	(Portugal) João Castanheira		1
(Portugal) Art of Speed	Porsche 911 GT3 Cup 3.8 (997.II)	307	(Portugal) Frederico Castro		1
(Portugal) AF&V Motorsport	Porsche 911 GT3 Cup	17	(Portugal) André Fernandes		5
(Portugal) Monteiros Competições	Porsche 911 GT3 Cup (991.I)	33	(Portugal) Rui Mirita		All
(Portugal) Monteiros Competições	Porsche 911 GT3 Cup 3.8 (997.II)	73	(Portugal) Vítor Costa		All
(Portugal) Veloso Motorsport	Porsche 911 GT3 Cup 3.8 (997.II)	66	(Portugal) João Posser		1, 5-6
(United Kingdom) Tockwith Motorsport	Porsche 911 GT3 Cup (991.I)	69	(United Kingdom) Marcus Fothergill	(Monaco) Dave Bennet	1, 4-6
(United Kingdom) Tockwith Motorsport	Porsche 911 GT3 Cup (991.I)	69	(United Kingdom) Marcus Fothergill		2
(Portugal) Protech Motorsport	Ferrari F430 Challenge (F131)	430	(Portugal) Pedro Paiva Raposo	(United Kingdom) Adam Fawsitt	All

=== Touring cars ===
Team	Car	No.	Drivers		Rounds
TCR
(Spain) RX Pro Racing	Hyundai i30 N TCR (PD *2017-2021*)	55	(Spain) Alexander Villanueva		2
(Portugal) JT59 Racing Team	Hyundai Elantra N TCR (CN7 *2021-2023*)	59	(Portugal) Daniel Teixeira		1, 3, 5-6
(Portugal) J.Santos Competiçao	Peugeot 308 TCR	99	(Netherlands) Michel Fernandes		3
TC
(Portugal) Art of Speed	SEAT León Supercopa MK2	18	(Portugal) João Castanheira	(Portugal) Frederico Formiga	6
(Portugal) Monteiros Competições	Ginetta G40	101	(Portugal) Martim Romão	(Portugal) João Faria	1
(Portugal) Monteiros Competições	Ginetta G40	101	(Portugal) Rodrigo Vilaça	(Portugal) Diogo Castro	2
(Portugal) Monteiros Competições	Ginetta G40	101	(Portugal) Tomás Martins	(Portugal) Tomás Gomes	5
(Portugal) Monteiros Competições	Ginetta G40	101	(Portugal) Tomás Martins	(Portugal) Rodrigo Vilaça	6
(Portugal) Monteiros Competições	Ginetta G40	102	(Portugal) Tomás Martins	(Portugal) Rodrigo Vilaça	1
(Portugal) Monteiros Competições	Ginetta G40	102	(Portugal) Martim Romão	(Portugal) Tomás Gomes	2
(Portugal) Monteiros Competições	Ginetta G40	102	(Portugal) João Faria	(Portugal) Diogo Castro	5
(Portugal) Monteiros Competições	Ginetta G40	102	(Portugal) Martim Romão	(Portugal) João Faria	6
(Portugal) Monteiros Competições	Ginetta G40	103	(Portugal) Diogo Castro	(Portugal) Tomás Gomes	1, 6
(Portugal) Monteiros Competições	Ginetta G40	103	(Portugal) João Faria	(Portugal) Tomás Martins	2

== Calendar ==
A calendar with 6 rounds was announced, with 4 of them counting for each championship.
IbS = Iberian Supercars
ScE = Supercars España
CPV = Campeonato de Portugal de Velocidade

Round	Circuit	Date	IbS	ScE	CPV	Supporting Program
1	(Portugal) Autódromo Internacional do Algarve	5–6 April	✅	✅	✅	Algarve Iberian Racing Festival; Group 1 Pre-1982 Portugal; Single Seater Series; Iberian Historic Endurance
2	(Spain) Circuito del Jarama	30 May–1 June		✅		Jarama Classic; Caterham Motorsport Iberia; Carrera Los 80's Iberian Historic Endurance
3	(Portugal) Circuito de Vila Real	4–5 July			✅	54° Circuito Internacional de Vila Real; TCR World Tour; Campeonato de Portugal de Velocidade de Clássicos; Campeonato de Portugal de Velocidade de Legends; Type R Legacy Cup
4	(Spain) Circuito Ricardo Tormo	13–14 September	✅	✅		Valencia Iberian Racing Festival; Group 1 Pre-1982 Portugal; Iberian Historic Endurance; Single Seater Series; Carrera Los 80's
5	(Spain) Circuito de Jerez	1–2 November	✅	✅	✅	Jerez Iberian Racing Festival; Porsche Sprint Challenge Ibérica; Caterham Motorsport Iberia; Copa Racer Confortauto
6	(Portugal) Autódromo do Estoril	29–30 November	✅		✅	Estoril Endurance Festival; Group 1 Pre-1982 Portugal; Iberian Historic Endurance; Carrera Los 80's Single Seater Series

== Standings ==
Points system

Position	1st	2nd	3rd	4th	5th	6th	7th	8th	9th	10th	Rest	PP	VR
Points	25	20	17	14	12	10	8	6	4	2	1	1	1

- Although points are awarded, drivers who participate in less than 50% of the rounds do not count towards the final championship standings nor are eligible for prizes.
- For the final points tally, all results are considered except the worst result of the first three rounds.

=== Iberian Supercars ===
GT4

Pos	Pilotos		Cat.	ALG (Portugal)		CRT (Spain)		JER (Spain)		EST (Portugal)		Retención	Pts
1	(France) Mathieu Martins		PRO	2	2	10	3	3	3	4	4	(124 - 2)	122
2	(Portugal) César Machado		PRO	1	9	9	2	2	2	2	6	(123 - 4)	119
3	(Portugal) Francisco Mora	(Portugal) Francisco Abreu	PRO	10	1	5	Ret	1	20	Ret	1		98
4	(Portugal) José Carlos Pires	(Portugal) Tomás Guedes	PRO	5	4	13	4	6	1	3	9	(97 - 1)	96
5	(Spain) Adrián Ferrer		PRO			9	2	2	2	2	6		94
6	(Portugal) Henrique V. Oliveira		PRO	6	8	6	Ret	3	3	4	5		91
7	(Portugal) Alexandre Areia	(Portugal) Nuno Afonso	PR-BR	4	5	1	10	Ret	7	17	2		84
8	(Portugal) José Cautela	(Portugal) Lourenço Monteiro	PR-BR	Ret	13	7	15	4	4	6	3		66
8	(Portugal) Bruno Pires	(Slovenia) Mark Kastelic	PR-BR	9	3	3	7	12	6	11	7	(66 - 1)	65
10	(Spain) Guillermo Aso	(Romania) Filip Vava	PR-BR	3	7	4	6	8	9	7	22†	(71 - 6)	65
11	(Portugal) Patrick Cunha		PR-BR	Ret	11	23	8	10	13	1	5		49
12	(Portugal) João Aguiar-Branco		PRO	8	10	20	Ret	5	5	5	19†		46
13	(Portugal) Orlando Batina	(Portugal) Sérgio Azevedo	PR-BR	7	6	8	5	14	10	Ret	18	(42 - 1)	41
14	(Portugal) Luís Tavares		PRO			20	Ret	5	5	5	19†		38
15	(Spain) José M. de los Milagros	(Spain) Nerea Martí	PRO	17	16	11	1	11	8	Ret	21	(38 - 1)	37
16	(Lithuania) Andrius Zemaitis		BR	23	22	2	18	21	15	10	12	(30 - 1)	29
17	(Spain) Álvaro Lobera	(Spain) Gonzalo de Andrés	BR	11	Ret	Ret	11	7	18	8	11		18
18	(Switzerland) Max Huber	(Uruguay) Tomás Granzella	PRO	16	19	12	9	9	12	Ret	8	(15 - 1)	14
19	(Portugal) Vasco Oliveira	(Portugal) Francisco Carvalho	BR	15	14	21	32	19	23†	9	17	(11 - 1)	10
20	(Portugal) Ricardo Costa		BR	14	20	17	13	17	11	13	10	(10 - 1)	9
21	(Colombia) Andrés Prieto		BR			17	13	17	11	13	10		8
22	(Portugal) Rúben Vaquinhas	(Portugal) Pedro Bastos Rezende	AM	18	21	19	23	20	19	16	15	(8 - 1)	7
23	(Andorra) Smörg	(Spain) Javier Macias	AM	19	23	36	24	22	Ret	18	20		7
24	(Portugal) Paulo Macedo	(Portugal) Luís Calheiros	PRO	Ret	DNS	14	21	16	14	15	13		6
25	(Portugal) Miguel Nabais	(Portugal) André Nabais	BR	20	17	16	16	Ret	DNS	12	14		6
26	(Portugal) Bruno Pereira	(Portugal) Gonçalo Araújo	PR-BR	12	18	31†	Ret			DNS	DNS		3
Drivers not eligible to score points for having competed in less than half of the championship
	(Brazil) Roberto Faria		PRO	2	2	10	3					(59)	
	(Germany) Hendrik Still		PRO							1	5	(38)	
	(Portugal) Rafael Lobato		PRO	1	9							(29)	
	(Romania) Luca Savu		PRO	6	8	6	Ret					(26)	
	(Switzerland) Karel Staut		PRO			2	18					(23)	
	(Portugal) Miguel Cristóvão		PR-BR			23	8	10	13			(10)	
	(Portugal) Bernardo Pinheiro		PRO	8	10							(8)	
	(Sweden) Jonathan Engström		PRO	13	12	18	14	18	16			(4)	
	(Portugal) Filipe Videira	(Portugal) António Lopes	AM	24	24	Ret	33					(4)	
	(Slovenia) Kyam Potez		BR			Ret	12	13	22†			(3)	
	(Spain) Vicente Dasí	(Spain) Josep Parera	AM			Ret	22	23	21			(3)	
	(Germany) Patrick Steinmetz		PRO	13	12							(2)	
	(Denmark) Louis Leveau		PRO			18	14					(2)	
	(United Kingdom) Ian Loggie		BR	14	20							(2)	
	(Norway) Olav Vaa	(Norway) Andreas Vaa	PRO	21	15							(2)	
	(Portugal) Jorge Rodrigues		PR-BR	Ret	11							(1)	
	(Portugal) Álvaro Ramos	(Portugal) Alexandre Martins	AM	Ret	Ret								
Pilotos no aptos para puntuar ni bloquear
	(Spain) Manuel Bertolín		BR			15	17						
	(Spain) Borja Hormigos	(Spain) Héctor Hernández	BR			28	19	15	17	14	16		
	(Germany) Jan-Niklas Stieler		PRO					18	16				
	(United Kingdom) Aubrey Hall	(United Kingdom) Jemma Moore	PRO	22	DNS								
Pos	Pilotos		Cat.	ALG (Portugal)		CRT (Spain)		JER (Spain)		EST (Portugal)		Retención	Pts

GTC

Pos	Pilotos		Cat.	ALG (Portugal)		CRT (Spain)		JER (Spain)		EST (Portugal)		Retención	Pts
1	(Portugal) Rui Miritta		CUP	1	3	25	25	8	2	2	2	(166 - 8)	158
2	(Portugal) Pompeu Simöes	(Portugal) Duarte Camelo	GTX	11	2	27	20	6	1	3	12	(122 - 1)	121
3	(Spain) Ángel Santos		GTX	DNS	8	24	38†	2	6	4	5		96
4	(Portugal) Henrique M. Oliveira		GTX	10	6	26	37†	4	4	9	3	(88 - 1)	87
5	(United Kingdom) Gracie Mitchell	(Italy) Luca Staccini	GTX	8	4	37	DNS	7	3	5	4		82
6	(United Kingdom) Marcus Fothergill	(Mauritius) Dave Bennet	CUP	3	7	Ret	27	5	Ret				71
7	(Portugal) António Almeida		GTX	9	11	22	29	17	5	6	Ret	(66 - 1)	65
8	(Spain) Alejandro Iribas		GTX	DNS	8	24	38†	2	6				64
9	(Spain) Alba Vázquez	(Spain) Alfonso Colomina	GTX	2	5	Ret	26	10	7				63
10	(United Kingdom) Thomas Roche		GTX			22	29	17	5	6	Ret		60
11	(Portugal) Gabriel Caçoilo		GTX			Ret	36	3	Ret	4	5		55
12	(Spain) Alex Wendt		GTX			29	28	11	9	8	9		42
13	(United Kingdom) Steve Kirton	(United Kingdom) Jonathan Elsworth	GTX	4	10	32	30	18	11	10	NC	(38 - 1)	37
14	(Portugal) Pedro Paiva Raposo	(United Kingdom) Adam Fawsitt	CUP	5	12	33	Ret	13	10	17	13		22
15	(Portugal) Fernando Soares	(Portugal) Miguel Ferreira	GTX	6	Ret			DNS	DNS	13	11		13
16	(Portugal) Vítor Costa		CUP	13	15	34	31	12	Ret	Ret	14		12
17	(Portugal) João Posser		CUP	18†	DNS			WD	WD	Ret	Ret		1
Drivers not eligible to score points for having competed in less than half of the championship
	(United Kingdom) Chloe Grant		GTX					4	4	9	3	(57)	
	(Spain) Himar Acosta		GTX					3	Ret			(22)	
	(Portugal) Ruben Silva		GTX	10	6							(15)	
	(France) Pascal Trieux	(France) Stéphane Codet	GTX							14	6	(13)	
	(Spain) Máximo Varela	(Spain) Aleix Nogués	GTX					9	8			(12)	
	(France) David Chiche	(France) Pierre-Alexis Lacorte	GTX							12	7	(11)	
	(France) William Cavailles	(France) Thomas Cavailles	GTX							11	8	(10)	
	(Spain) Ángel Lanchares		CUP			30	35					(10)	
	(Spain) Borja Hormigos	(Spain) Héctor Hernández	GTX	7	Ret							(8)	
	(Portugal) João Castanheira		CUP	12	9							(7)	
	(Spain) Jaime Sanchis		GTX					11	9			(6)	
	(United Kingdom) Simon Moore		GTX	9	11							(6)	
	(Belgium) Olivier Muytjens	(France) Brice Pineau	GTX			35	34					(5)	
	(Portugal) André Fernandes		CUP					Ret	15†			(3)	
	(France) Olivier López	(France) Christian Philippon	GTX							15	15	(2)	
	(France) Emmanuel Gachiteguy	(France) Franck Labescat	GTX							16	16	(2)	
	(Spain) Pere Marques		GTX			Ret	36					(1)	
	(Portugal) Frederico Castro		CUP	Ret	DNS								
	(Spain) Miguel Gaspar		GTX			Ret	DNS			Ret	DNS		
	(Spain) Álvaro Fontes		GTX			Ret	DNS						
	(Spain) Ramiro García-Pumarino		CUP					WD	WD				
Pos	Pilotos		Cat.	ALG (Portugal)		CRT (Spain)		JER (Spain)		EST (Portugal)		Retención	Pts

Turismos

Pos	Pilotos		Cat.	ALG (Portugal)		CRT (Spain)	JER (Spain)		EST (Portugal)		Retención	Pts
1	(Portugal) Daniel Teixeira		TCR	17	1		1	Ret	1	1		124
2	(Portugal) João Faria		TC	16	14		14	12	19	18		120
3	(Portugal) Martim Romão		TC	16	14		16	13	19	18		113
4	(Portugal) Tomás Martins		TC	15	13		15	14	NC	19		92
5	(Portugal) Rodrigo Vilaça		TC	15	13		16	13	NC	19		91
6	(Portugal) Diogo Castro		TC	14	16		14	12	WD	WD		85
7	(Portugal) Tomás Gomes		TC	14	16		15	14	WD	WD		74
Drivers not eligible to score points for having competed in less than half of the championship
	(Portugal) João Castanheira	(Portugal) Frederico Formiga	TC						18	17		

=== Remaining rounds ===
(Spain) Jarama – Supercars Espana

Drivers		Class	JAR (Spain)		Pts Rd
GT4
(Spain) José M. de los Milagros	(Spain) Nerea Martí	PRO	1	2	47
(Brazil) Roberto Faria	(France) Mathieu Martins	PRO	2	1	45
(Portugal) Francisco Mora	(Portugal) Francisco Abreu	PRO	7	3	27
(Switzerland) Max Huber	(Uruguay) Tomás Granzella	PRO	4	6	24
(Spain) Guillermo Aso	(Romania) Filip Vava	PR-BR	8	4	20
(Portugal) Orlando Batina	(Portugal) Miguel Lobo	PR-BR	5	7	20
(Portugal) José Carlos Pires	(Portugal) Tomás Guedes	PRO	3	26†	18
(Portugal) Alexandre Areia	(Portugal) Nuno Afonso	PR-BR	21	5	13
(Portugal) Bernardo Pinheiro	(Portugal) João Aguiar-Branco	PRO	6	Ret	10
(Portugal) Ricardo Costa	(Colombia) Andrés Prieto	BR	9	9	8
(Sweden) Jonathan Engström	(Denmark) Louis Leveau	PRO	15	8	7
(Portugal) Vasco Oliveira	(Portugal) Francisco Carvalho	BR	17	10	3
(Lithuania) Andrius Zemaitis		BR	14	12	3
(Andorra) Smörg	(Spain) Javier Macias	AM	16	13	2
(Portugal) Filipe Videira	(Portugal) António Lopes	AM	22	20	2
GTC
(Spain) Ángel Santos		GTX	10	11	51
(Spain) Héctor Hernández		GTX	13	15	32
(Spain) Alba Vázquez	(Spain) Alfonso Colomina	GTX	13	16	31
(United Kingdom) Simon Moore	(United Kingdom) Aubrey Hall	GTX	20	14	28
(Portugal) Rui Miritta		CUP	24	19	13
Touring cars
(Portugal) João Faria	(Portugal) Tomás Martins	TC	27	22	53

(Portugal) Vila Real – CPV

Drivers		Class	VIL (Portugal)		Pts Rd
GT4
(Brazil) Roberto Faria	(France) Mathieu Martins	PRO	3	2	37
Touring cars
(Portugal) Daniel Teixeira		TCR	TBC	TBC	54
