= Supercars Endurance Series =

Motorsport event in Portugal and Spain

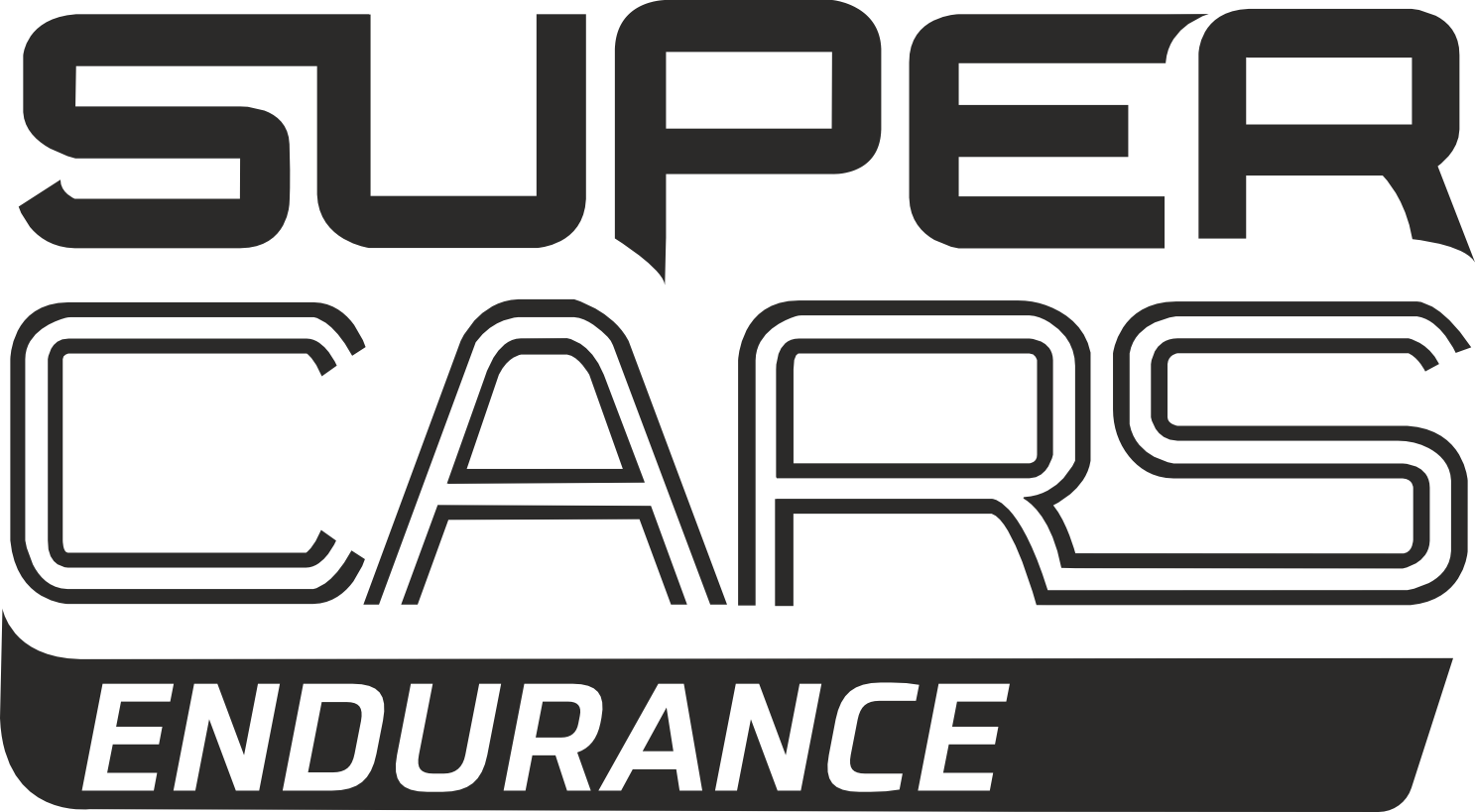
- Category: GT4; GTC; Touring cars
- Country: Spain; Portugal
- Inaugural season: 2020
- Drivers' champion: GT4: (France) Mathieu Martins (ISC + SCE); (Portugal) César Machado (CPV); GTC: (Portugal) Rui Miritta; TC: (Portugal) Daniel Teixeira
- Teams' champion: (Portugal) Speedy Motorsport
- Official website: www.gt4south.com

The Supercars Endurance Series, formerly known as the GT4 South European Series, is a collection of three endurance racing competitions focused mainly on GT4 and Touring cars, held at circuits in Portugal and Spain.

== History ==
The championship began in 2019 under the name GT4 South European Series. It was created and organized by the Portuguese promoter Race Ready, with support from the Stéphane Ratel Organisation (SRO). The season started on 20 April at Nogaro and concluded on 24 November at the Autódromo do Estoril, consisting of five point-scoring weekends with two races each, as well as one non-championship race: the Vila Real International Cup.

In 2020, the championship was affected by the COVID-19 pandemic. Only two rounds were held in December and January of the following year, but each round featured three races. Divisions were eliminated, and a single overall champion was crowned.

In 2021, the championship was restructured and renamed Supercars Endurance, opening the series to TCR cars as well. This format continued in 2022. In 2023, a separate overall GT4 championship was created, and other types of touring cars besides TCR were also accepted. The 2023 calendar consisted of four races, two in Portugal and two in Spain. Three of these races were held in conjunction with the Portuguese Speed Championship.

For 2024, a calendar of six events was announced, with four of them counting towards each of the following championships: the Iberian Supercars as the Iberian championship, the Portuguese Speed Championship as the national Portuguese championship, and Supercars Spain (Jarama RACE 2024) as the Spanish trophy.

For 2025, the championship featured a total of six rounds across three classes: Iberian SuperCars, the Portuguese CPV (Campeonato de Portugal de Velocidade), and SuperCars España.

== Logos ==
During the 2026 season, three championships are contested within the Supercars Endurance Series: the Iberian Supercars, the Campeonato de Portugal de Velocidade (CPV), and Supercars España. The logos of the championships are shown below.

Logos of the championships

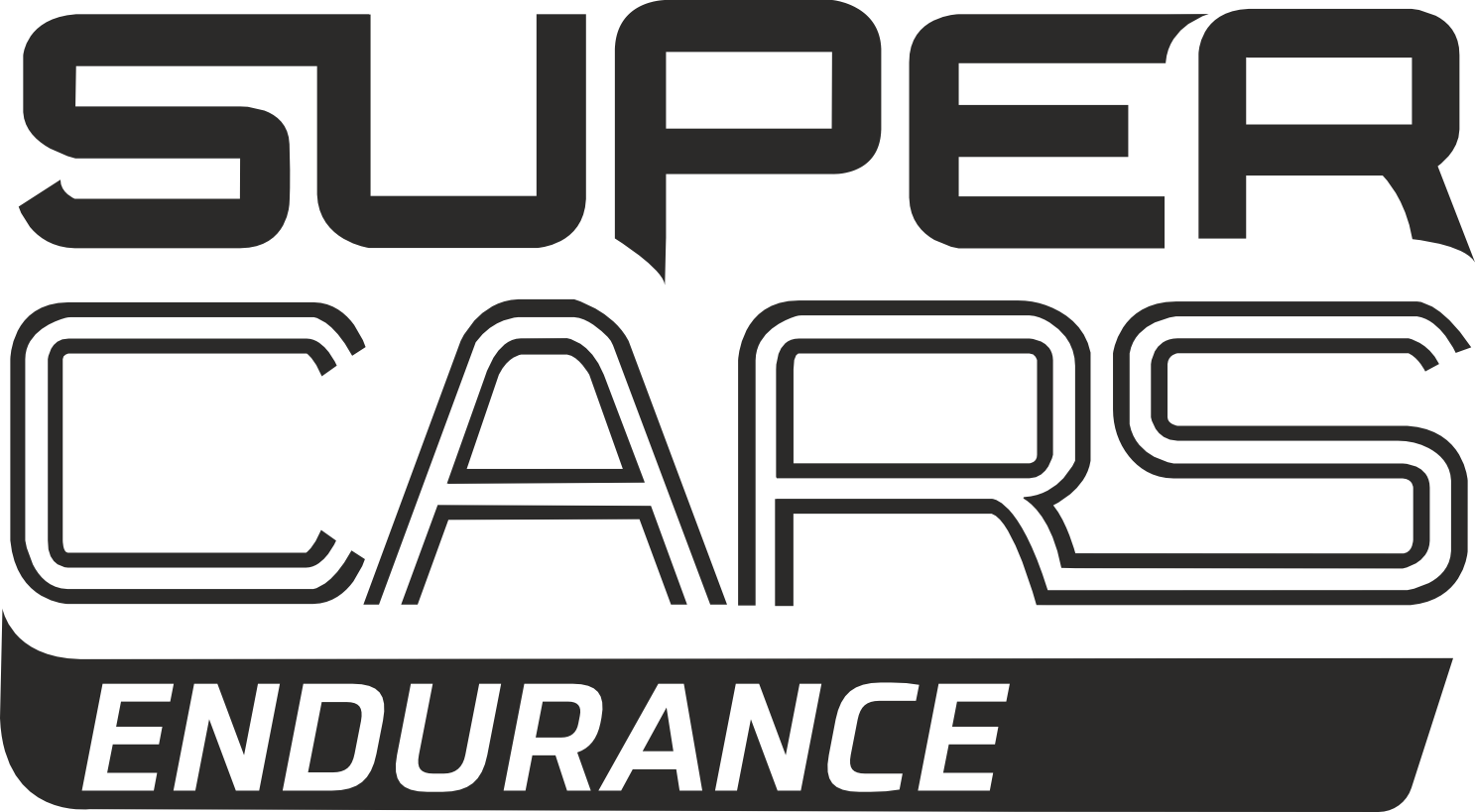
The logo of the Supercars Endurance Series

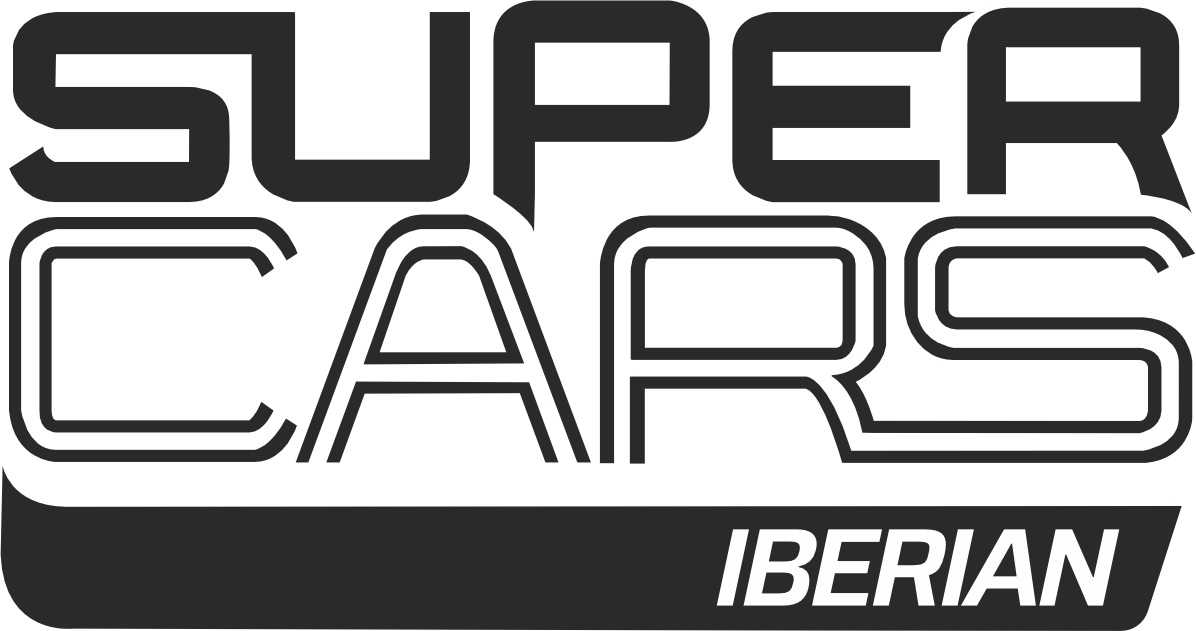
The logo of the Iberian Supercars

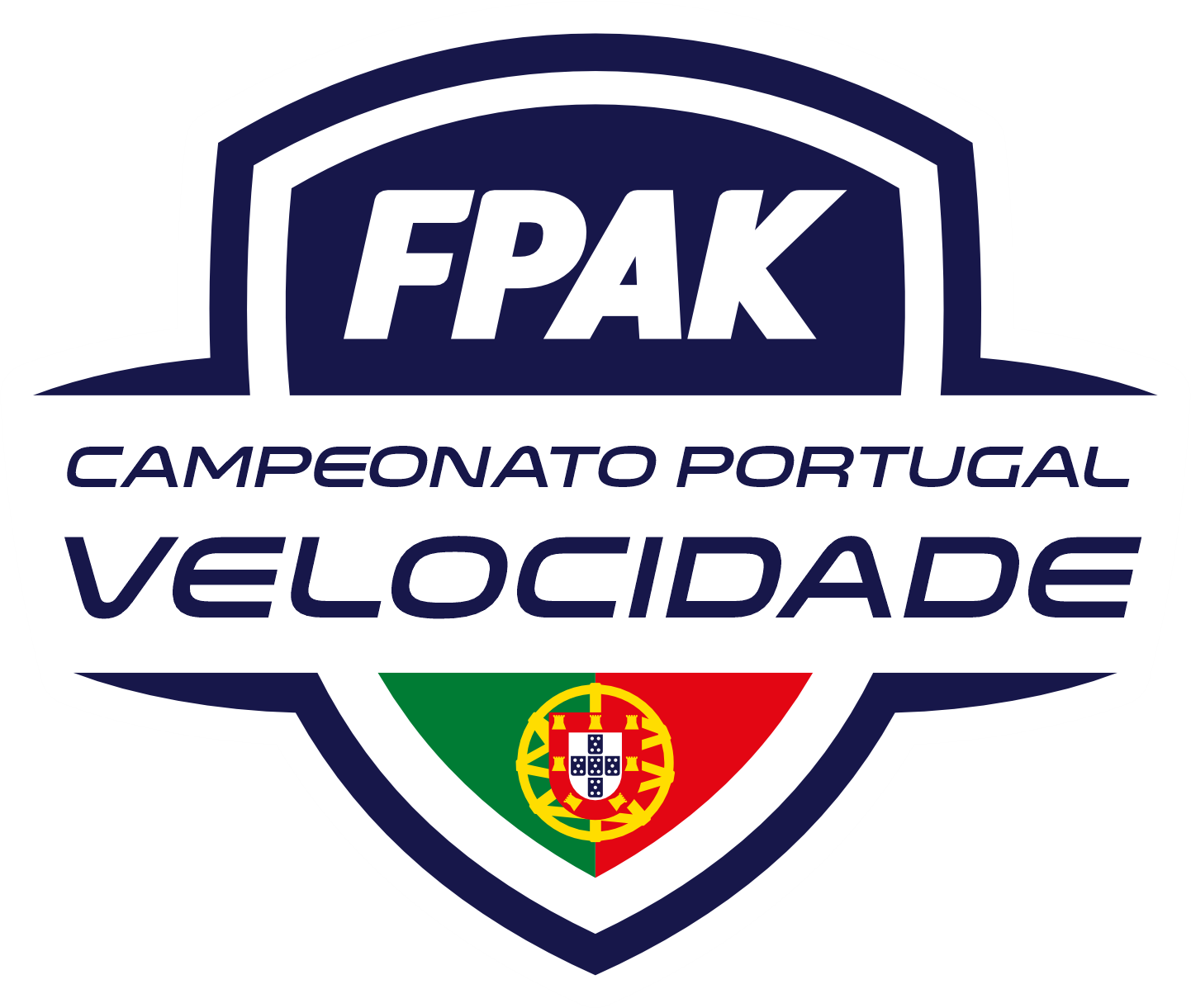
The logo of the Campeonato de Portugal de Velocidade (CPV)

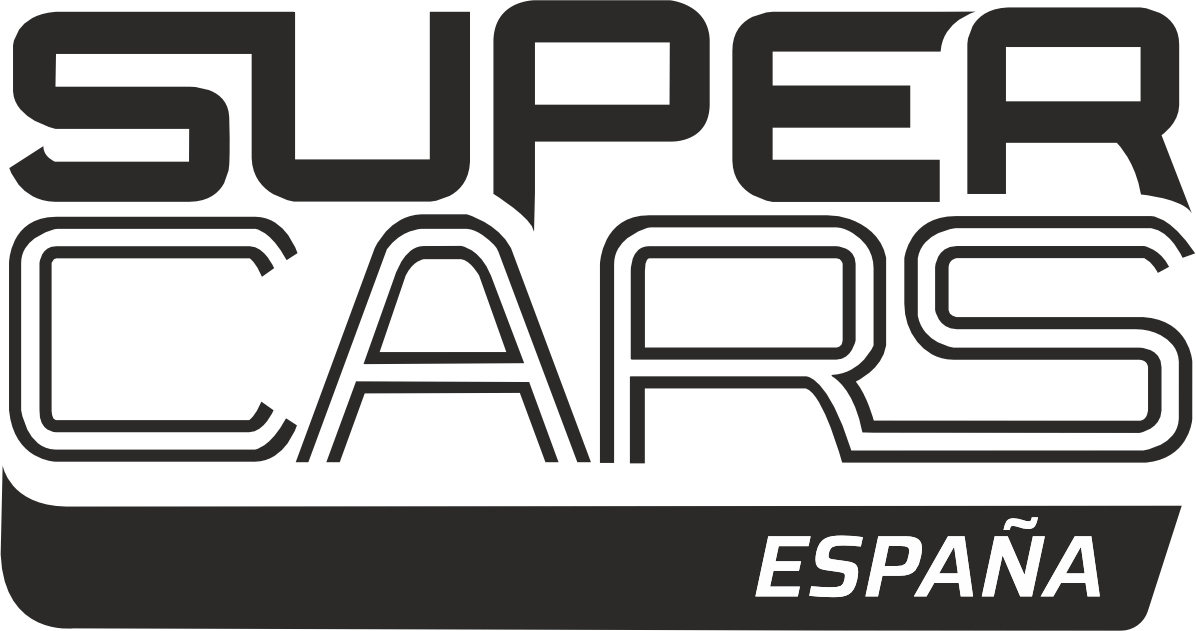
The logo of Supercars España

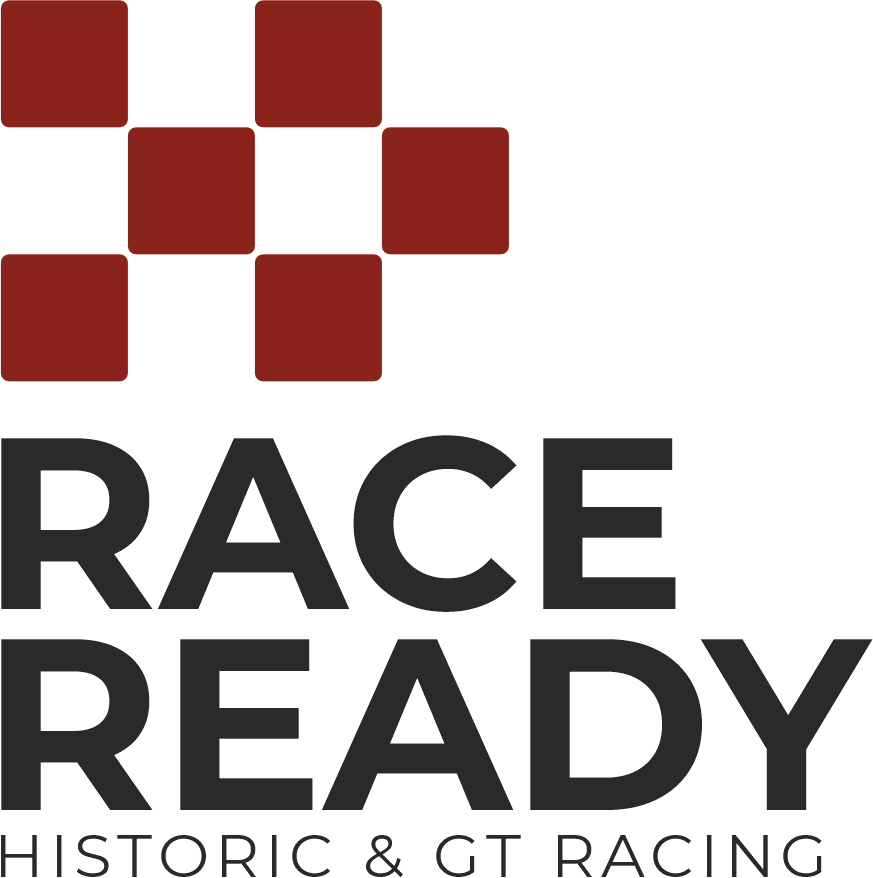
The logo of Race Ready Historic & GT Racing, the organizers of the Supercars Endurance Series

== Live streaming ==
All races of the 2025 season were broadcast live on DAZN Spain & Portugal for free with Spanish commentary. In addition, there was an English live stream on the YouTube channels of Alpha Live and the organizer Race Ready. Motorsport Television Deutschland also streamed the races on their YouTube channel with German commentary. The Italian outlet Parc Ferme TV broadcast the races with Italian commentary.

Where the races of the 2026 season will be streamed is still unclear.

== 2024 format ==
Each race weekend follows the format:

- Optional free/private practice sessions of 40 or 60 minutes maximum.
- Two 15-minute qualifying sessions (Driver 1 participates in Q1, Driver 2 participates in Q2).
- Two 45-minute races, with a mandatory pit stop for the driver change between minutes 20 and 30 of the race (Driver 1 starts Race 1, Driver 2 starts Race 2).
- Handicap system based on extra pit stop time, applied to the top 3 finishers of the previous race (10, 5, and 3 seconds).

The three championships are divided into the following divisions and trophies:

- GT4: GT4 Pro, GT4 Bronze and GT4 Am
- GTC: GTX and GT Cup
- Touring Cars: TCR and TC

Scoring system:

Position	1st	2nd	3rd	4th	5th	6th	7th	8th	9th	10th	Remaining	Pole Position	Fastest Lap
Points	25	20	17	14	12	10	8	6	4	2	1	1	1

- The worst result of the first six races is discarded.

== Champions ==
GT4 South European Series
Year	GT4 Pro-Am	GT4 Am	GTC		Teams
2019	(Portugal) Francisco Abreu (Portugal) Miguel Cristóvão	(Portugal) Francisco Carvalho	(United Kingdom) Edward Moore (United Kingdom) Marmaduke Hall		(Portugal) Veloso Motorsport
2020	(United Kingdom) Stephen (France) Romain Monti	(Spain) Andrius Zemaitis	(United Kingdom) Jemma Moore (United Kingdom) Aubrey Hall		Not awarded
Supercars Endurance
	GT4 Pro	GT4 Bronze	GTC	TCR	Teams
2021	(United Kingdom) Marmaduke Hall	(Spain) Andrius Zemaitis	(United Kingdom) Jemma Moore	(Portugal) Gustavo Moura	(Portugal) P&B Racing
2022	(Portugal) Manuel Giao (Finland) Elias Niskanen	(Portugal) Manuel Cristovao (Portugal) Francisco Carvalho	(Portugal) Bruno Pires	(Portugal) Daniel Teixeira	(Spain) SMC Motorsport
GT4 & Touring Cars
2023	(Portugal) José Carlos Pires (Portugal) Francisco Abreu		(Portugal) Álvaro Ramos (Portugal) Fernando Soares	(Portugal) Daniel Teixeira	(Slovenia) Lema Racing
2024	(Portugal) César Machado (Spain) Jan Durán		(Portugal) Rui Miritta	(Portugal) Daniel Teixeira	(Portugal) Speedy Motorsport (ISC + CPV) (Spain) NM Racing Team (SJR)
2025	(France) Mathieu Martins (ISC + SCE) (Portugal) César Machado (CPV)		(Portugal) Rui Miritta	(Portugal) Daniel Teixeira	(Portugal) Speedy Motorsport

=== GT4 ===
Year		GT4 Pro	GT4 Pro-Bronze	GT4 Bronze	GT4 Am
2023	(Portugal) José Carlos Pires (Portugal) Francisco Abreu		(Portugal) Patrick Cunha (Portugal) Jorge Rodrigues		
2024	Iberian	(Portugal) César Machado (Spain) Jan Durán	(Portugal) Patrick Cunha (Portugal) Jorge Rodrigues	(United States) Keith Gatehouse (United Arab Emirates) Igor Sorokin	
2024	CPV	(Portugal) César Machado (Spain) Jan Durán	(Portugal) Patrick Cunha (Portugal) Jorge Rodrigues	(Portugal) André Nabais (Portugal) Miguel Nabais	
2024	Jarama	(Portugal) César Machado (Spain) Jan Durán	(Spain) Nil Montserrat (Spain) Alberto de Martín	(United States) Keith Gatehouse (United Arab Emirates) Igor Sorokin	
2025	Iberian	(Portugal) César Machado	(Portugal) Alexandre Areia (Portugal) Nuno Afonso	(Spain) Gonzalo de Andrés (Spain) Álvaro Lobera	(Portugal) Ruben Vaquinhas (Portugal) Pedro Bastos R.
2025	CPV	(Portugal) César Machado	(Portugal) Bruno Pires	(Portugal) Ricardo Costa	(Portugal) Ruben Vaquinhas (Portugal) Pedro Bastos R.
2025	España	(France) Mathieu Martins	(Spain) Guillermo Aso (Romania) Filip Vava	(Portugal) Ricardo Costa	(Portugal) Ruben Vaquinhas (Portugal) Pedro Bastos R.

=== GTC ===
Year		GTX	GTCup
2023	(Portugal) Álvaro Ramos (Portugal) Fernando Soares	(United Kingdom) Marcus Fothergill (United Kingdom) Dave Benett	
2024	Iberian	(United Kingdom) Simon Moore (Portugal) Tomás Pinto Abreu	(Portugal) Rui Miritta
2024	CPV	(Lithuania) Andrius Zemaitis	(Portugal) Rui Miritta
2024	Jarama	(United Kingdom) Simon Moore (Portugal) Tomás Pinto Abreu	(Portugal) Rui Miritta
2025	Iberian	(Portugal) Duarte Camelo (Portugal) Pompeu Simões	(Portugal) Rui Miritta
2025	CPV	(Portugal) Duarte Camelo (Portugal) Pompeu Simões	(Portugal) Rui Miritta
2025	España	(Spain) Ángel Santos (Spain) Alejandro Iribas	(Portugal) Rui Miritta

=== Touring cars ===
Year		TCR	TC
2023	(Portugal) Daniel Teixeira	(Spain) Borja Hormigos (Spain) Héctor Hernández	
2024	Iberian	(Portugal) Daniel Teixeira	(Portugal) João Oliveira
2024	CPV	(Portugal) Daniel Teixeira	(Portugal) João Oliveira
2024	Jarama	(Portugal) Daniel Teixeira	(Portugal) João Oliveira
2025	Iberian	(Portugal) Daniel Teixeira	(Portugal) João Faria
2025	CPV	(Portugal) Daniel Teixeira	(Portugal) João Faria
2025	España	(Portugal) Daniel Teixeira	(Portugal) João Faria
