= GT4 South =

GT4 South may refer to:

- GT4 South European Series, an Iberian regional sportscar series founded in 2019
- FFSA GT - GT4 France, a regional sportscar racing series promoted by the FFSA and organised by the SRO which added a competition for the GT4 category in 2017
- GT4 European Series Southern Cup, a regional sportscar racing series, created in 2017 by the Stephane Ratel Organisation as a sister series to GT4 European Series Northern Cup. This was then adopted by the FFSA in 2018, and the SRO series reverted to a single pan-Europe GT4 European Series
