= Parpública =

Parpública, officially Participações Públicas (SGPS) S.A., is a state holding company that can be characterized as a National Wealth Fund of the Portuguese Republic. The company is based in Lisbon, Portugal. Among its major assets are TAP Portugal, ANA - Aeroportos de Portugal, Águas de Portugal, Imprensa Nacional Casa da Moeda, Companhia das Lezírias and the Estoril Circuit. It has been described as Portugal's Public-private partnership unit.
