= Fernanda Pires da Silva =

Portuguese businesswoman (1926–2020)

Fernanda Ferreira Pires da Silva GOM GCM ComMAI (27 August 1926 – 11 January 2020) was a Portuguese businesswoman. She was President of Grupo Grão-Pará, a conglomerate focusing on construction, real estate, tourism, hotel management, and marble.

== Biography ==
Da Silva was born in Lisbon, Portugal.

On 16 November 1972, she was made Commander of the Industrial Class; on 20 February 1989, she was made Grand Officer of the Order of Merit; and on March 11, 2000, she was raised to the Grand Cross of the same Order.

By her first husband Abel de Moura Pinheiro, she was the mother of the businessman Abel Saturnino da Silva de Moura Pinheiro (25 April 1946), who married Maria João de Lacerda de Barros Caetano de Moura Pinheiro (2 May 1957), and has children. By her second husband Alberto Teotónio Pereira (6 July 1893 – 23 June 1957), she was the mother of João Paulo Teotónio Pereira (29 July 1948 – 14 September 2001), who married Ana Margarida Buzaglo Zagury Teotónio Pereira (October 4, 1951), and has children.

In recognition of her family's contribution to the building of the Autódromo do Estoril for Portuguese motor sport, the circuit was renamed in her honour. She died in Rio de Janeiro, aged 93.
