= 2019 GT4 South European Series =

The 2019 GT4 South European Series was the first season of the GT4 South European Series, a sports car championship created and organised by Iberian-based promoter Race Ready and supported by the Stéphane Ratel Organisation (SRO). The season began on 20 April in Nogaro and ended on 24 November at Circuito do Estoril.

== Calendar ==
The competition will consist in 5 weekends with 2 races each, and a non championship race, the Vila Real International Cup.

Round	Circuit	Date	Supporting
1	Circuit Paul Armagnac, Nogaro, France	20–22 April	Coupes de Pâques
2	Circuito del Jarama, San Sebastián de los Reyes, Spain	15–16 June	Jarama Classic
	Circuito de Vila Real, Vila Real, Portugal	5–7 July	Vila Real International Cup (non championship race)
3	Circuit de Barcelona-Catalunya, Montmeló, Spain	30 August–1 September	24H Barcelona
4	Algarve International Circuit, Portimão, Portugal	25–27 October	ELMS
5	Circuito do Estoril, Estoril, Portugal	23–24 November	Estoril Racing Festival

== Entry list ==
Team	Car	No.	Drivers	Class	Rounds
(Spain) E2P	Ginetta G50 GT4	7	(Spain) Javier Escobar	GTC	2
(Spain) E2P	Ginetta G50 GT4	8	(Greece) Kosta Kanaroglou	GTC	2
(France) Team Speed Car	Alpine A110 GT4	8	(France) Robert Consani	PA	1
(France) Team Speed Car	Alpine A110 GT4	8	(France) Benjamin Lariche	PA	1
(Spain) Deyscom Sport	Ginetta G55 GT4	9	(Spain) Alex Arbesu	Am	2
(France) Saintéloc Racing	Audi R8 LMS GT4	14	(France) Eric Debard	PA	1
(France) Saintéloc Racing	Audi R8 LMS GT4	14	(France) Simon Gachet	PA	1
(France) Saintéloc Racing	Audi R8 LMS GT4	21	(France) Anthony Beltoise	PA	1
(France) Saintéloc Racing	Audi R8 LMS GT4	21	(France) Olivier Esteves	PA	1
(France) Saintéloc Racing	Audi R8 LMS GT4	42	(France) Grégory Guilvert	PA	1
(France) Saintéloc Racing	Audi R8 LMS GT4	42	(France) Fabien Michal	PA	1
(United Kingdom) Tockwith Motorsport	Ginetta G50 GT4	15	(United Kingdom) Marmaduke Hall	GTC	2
(United Kingdom) Tockwith Motorsport	Ginetta G50 GT4	15	(United Kingdom) Edward Moore	GTC	2
(United Kingdom) Tockwith Motorsport	Ginetta G50 GT4	115	(United Kingdom) Marmaduke Hall	GTC	1
(United Kingdom) Tockwith Motorsport	Ginetta G50 GT4	115	(United Kingdom) Edward Moore	GTC	1
(France) ABM Grand Prix	Ginetta G55 GT4	23	(France) Pierre-André Nicolas	PA	1
(France) ABM Grand Prix	Ginetta G55 GT4	23	(France) Christophe Vernet	PA	1
(France) ABM Grand Prix	Ginetta G55 GT4	23	(Portugal) César Machado	PA	2
(France) ABM Grand Prix	Ginetta G55 GT4	23	(Portugal) Mariano Pires	PA	2
(Spain) Plemar Sport	Ginetta G50 GT4	77	(Spain) Lorenzo López	GTC	2
(Spain) Plemar Sport	Ginetta G50 GT4	77	(Spain) Juan Reina Martin	GTC	2
(Portugal) Veloso Motorsport	Mercedes-AMG GT4	88	(Portugal) Francisco Abreu	PA	2
(Portugal) Veloso Motorsport	Mercedes-AMG GT4	88	(Portugal) Miguel Cristovão	PA	2
(Portugal) Veloso Motorsport	Mercedes-AMG GT4	188	(Portugal) Francisco Abreu	PA	1
(Portugal) Veloso Motorsport	Mercedes-AMG GT4	188	(Portugal) Miguel Cristovão	PA	1
(Poland) Team Virage	Aston Martin Vantage AMR GT4	94	(Austria) Jon Aizpurua	PA	2
(Poland) Team Virage	Aston Martin Vantage AMR GT4	94	(United States) Nicholas Silva	PA	2
(Poland) Team Virage	Aston Martin Vantage AMR GT4	95	(United Kingdom) C.O. Jones	Am	2
(Poland) Team Virage	Aston Martin Vantage AMR GT4	95	(Portugal) Peter Peters	Am	2
(Spain) 2TYM Racing	KTM X-Bow Super Light	110	(Spain) José Martinez Bueno	GTC	2
(Spain) 2TYM Racing	KTM X-Bow Super Light	110	(Spain) Miguel Fernandez Yuste	GTC	2
(Spain) NM Racing Team	Ginetta G55 GT4	215	(Spain) Jorge Cabezas	Am	2
(Spain) NM Racing Team	Ginetta G55 GT4	215	(Spain) Alberto de Marín	Am	2
(France) Mirage Racing	Alpine A110 GT4	616	(France) Axel Van Straaten	Am	1
(France) Mirage Racing	Alpine A110 GT4	616	(France) Rémi Van Straaten	Am	1
(France) Mirage Racing	Alpine A110 GT4	919	(France) Vincent Beltoise	PA	1
(France) Mirage Racing	Alpine A110 GT4	919	(France) Benoit Lison	PA	1
Entry Lists:

Icon	Class
PA	Pro-Am Class
Am	Am Class
GTC	GT Cup

== Race results ==
Bold indicates overall winner.

Round		Circuit	Pole position	Pro-Am winners	Am winners	GTC winners	Info
1	R1	(France) Nogaro	(France) No. 42 Saintéloc Racing	**(France) No. 42 Saintéloc Racing**	(France) No. 616 Mirage Racing	(United Kingdom) No. 15 Tockwith Motorsport	
1	R1	(France) Nogaro	(France) Grégory Guilvert (France) Fabien Michal	**(France) Grégory Guilvert** **(France) Fabien Michal**	(France) Axel Van Straaten (France) Rémi Van Straaten	(United Kingdom) Marmaduke Hall (United Kingdom) Edward Moore	
1	R2	(France) Nogaro	(France) No. 42 Saintéloc Racing	**(France) No. 42 Saintéloc Racing**	(France) No. 616 Mirage Racing	(United Kingdom) No. 115 Tockwith Motorsport	
1	R2	(France) Nogaro	(France) Grégory Guilvert (France) Fabien Michal	**(France) Grégory Guilvert** **(France) Fabien Michal**	(France) Axel Van Straaten (France) Rémi Van Straaten	(United Kingdom) Marmaduke Hall (United Kingdom) Edward Moore	
2	R1	(Spain) Jarama	(France) No. 23 ABM Grand Prix	**(France) No. 23 ABM Grand Prix**	(Spain) No. 215 NM Racing Team	(United Kingdom) No. 15 Tockwith Motorsport	
2	R1	(Spain) Jarama	(Portugal) César Machado (Portugal) Mariano Pires	**(Portugal) César Machado** **(Portugal) Mariano Pires**	(Spain) Jorge Cabezas (Spain) Alberto de Marín	(United Kingdom) Marmaduke Hall (United Kingdom) Edward Moore	
2	R2	(Spain) Jarama	(Poland) No. 94 Team Virage	**(Portugal) No. 88 Veloso Motorsport**	(Spain) No. 215 NM Racing Team	(Spain) No. 7 E2P	
2	R2	(Spain) Jarama	(Austria) Jon Aizpurua (United States) Nicholas Silva	**(Portugal) Francisco Abreu** **(Portugal) Miguel Cristovão**	(Spain) Jorge Cabezas (Spain) Alberto de Marín	(Spain) Javier Escobar (Spain) Amadeo Lladós	
N/C		(Portugal) Vila Real	**(France)** No. 8 Team Speed Car	**(Portugal) No. 88 Veloso Motorsport**	(Spain) No. 9 Deyscom Sport	(United Kingdom) No. 15 Tockwith Motorsport	
N/C		(Portugal) Vila Real	**(France)** Robert Consani **(France)** Benjamin Lariche	**(Portugal) Francisco Abreu** **(Portugal) Miguel Cristovão**	(Spain) Alex Arbesu (Spain) Efrén Vázquez	(United Kingdom) Marmaduke Hall (United Kingdom) Edward Moore	
3	R1	(Spain) Barcelona-Catalunya	**(Portugal) No. 88 Veloso Motorsport**	**(Portugal) No. 88 Veloso Motorsport**	(Austria) No. 71 KTM X-Bow GT4	(United Kingdom) No. 111 Tockwith Motorsport	
3	R1	(Spain) Barcelona-Catalunya	**(Portugal) Francisco Abreu** **(Portugal) Miguel Cristovão**	**(Portugal) Francisco Abreu** **(Portugal) Miguel Cristovão**	**(Portugal)** Gabriela Correia **(Portugal)** Francisco Carvalho	(United Kingdom) Jemma Moore (United Kingdom) Aubrey Hall	
3	R2	(Spain) Barcelona-Catalunya	**(Portugal)** No. 500 Ocean Racing Technology	**(Portugal) No. 88 Veloso Motorsport**	(Spain) No. 333 2TYM Racing	(United Kingdom) No. 15 Tockwith Motorsport	
3	R2	(Spain) Barcelona-Catalunya	**(Italy)** Fabio Onidi (United Kingdom) Jolyon Palmer	**(Portugal) Francisco Abreu** **(Portugal) Miguel Cristovão**	(Spain) Iván Maestro (Spain) Eduard López	(United Kingdom) Marmaduke Hall (United Kingdom) Edward Moore	
4	R1	(Portugal) Portimão	(France) No. 23 ABM Grand Prix	**(Portugal) No. 88 Veloso Motorsport**	(Spain) No. 16 NM Racing Team	(United Kingdom) No. 15 Tockwith Motorsport	
4	R1	(Portugal) Portimão	(Portugal) César Machado (Portugal) Mariano Pires	**(Portugal) Francisco Abreu** **(Portugal) Miguel Cristovão**	(United Kingdom) Stephen Pattrick (United Kingdom) Andy Meyrick	(United Kingdom) Marmaduke Hall (United Kingdom) Edward Moore	
4	R2	(Portugal) Portimão	**(Portugal)** No. 555 Ocean Racing Technology	**(Spain) No. 3 Plemar Sport**	(Spain) No. 16 NM Racing Team	(United Kingdom) No. 15 Tockwith Motorsport	
4	R2	(Portugal) Portimão	(Portugal) Ricardo Teixeira (Mexico) Esteban Gutiérrez	**(Portugal) Patrick Gião** **(Finland) Elias Niskanen**	(United Kingdom) Stephen Pattrick (United Kingdom) Andy Meyrick	(United Kingdom) Marmaduke Hall (United Kingdom) Edward Moore	
5	R1	(Portugal) Estoril	**(Portugal) No. 88 Veloso Motorsport**	**(Portugal) No. 88 Veloso Motorsport**	(United States) No. 43 RealTime Racing	(United Kingdom) Marmaduke Hall (United Kingdom) Edward Moore	
5	R1	(Portugal) Estoril	**(Portugal) Francisco Abreu** **(Portugal) Miguel Cristovão**	**(Portugal) Francisco Abreu** **(Portugal) Miguel Cristovão**	(United States) Dane Cameron (United States) Mike Hedlund	(United Kingdom) No. 15 Tockwith Motorsport	
5	R2	(Portugal) Estoril	**(Portugal) No. 88 Veloso Motorsport**	**(Portugal) No. 88 Veloso Motorsport**	(United States) No. 4 Squadra Corse	(United Kingdom) Marmaduke Hall (United Kingdom) Edward Moore	
5	R2	(Portugal) Estoril	**(Portugal) Francisco Abreu** **(Portugal) Miguel Cristovão**	**(Portugal) Francisco Abreu** **(Portugal) Miguel Cristovão**	(Mexico) Martin Fuentes (Netherlands) Renger van der Zande	(United Kingdom) No. 15 Tockwith Motorsport	

== Championship standings ==
Scoring system

Championship points were awarded for the first ten positions in each race. Entries were required to complete 75% of the winning car's race distance in order to be classified and earn points. Individual drivers were required to participate for a minimum of 25 minutes in order to earn championship points in any race.

Position	1st	2nd	3rd	4th	5th	6th	7th	8th	9th	10th
Points	25	18	15	12	10	8	6	4	2	1

=== Drivers' championship ===
Pos.	Driver	Team	NOG (France)	JAR (Spain)	VIL (Portugal)	BAR (Spain)	POR (Portugal)	EST (Portugal)	Points
Pro-Am Cup
Am Cup
GTC
Pos.	Driver	Team	NOG (France)	JAR (Spain)	VIL (Portugal)	BAR (Spain)	POR (Portugal)	EST (Portugal)	Points

Key
Colour	Result
Gold	Race winner
Silver	2nd place
Bronze	3rd place
Green	Points finish
Blue	Non-points finish
Blue	Non-classified finish (NC)
Purple	Did not finish (Ret)
Black	Disqualified (DSQ)
Black	Excluded (EX)
White	Did not start (DNS)
White	Race cancelled (C)
White	Withdrew (WD)
Blank	Did not participate

**Bold** – Pole

== See also ==
- 2019 GT4 European Series
