= Circuito do Estoril =

Motorsport track in Portugal

Autódromo Fernanda Pires da Silva Estoril Circuit
- Grand Prix Circuit (2000–present)
- Location: Alcabideche, Cascais, Portugal
- Coordinates: 38°45′3″N 9°23′39″W
- Capacity: 45,000
- FIA Grade: 2 (Grand Prix)
- Owner: Parpública (February 2007–present)
- Opened: 17 June 1972; 54 years ago
- Former names: Autódromo do Estoril
- Major events: Current: World SBK (1988, 1993, 2020–2022, 2024–present); FIM Moto3 Junior World Championship (2017–present); Former: Formula One; Portuguese Grand Prix (1984–1996); Grand Prix motorcycle racing Portuguese motorcycle Grand Prix (2000–2012); Porsche Cup Brasil (2011–2012, 2014, 2019, 2024–2025); FIM EWC (1987, 2000, 2020–2021); International GT Open (2006, 2008, 2015–2018, 2022); European Le Mans Series; 4 Hours of Estoril (2001, 2011, 2014–2016); DTM (2004); FIA WTCR Race of Portugal (2008, 2021); FIA GT (2000–2003)
- Website: http://www.circuito-estoril.pt/

Grand Prix Circuit (2000–present)
- Length: 4.182 km (2.599 mi)
- Turns: 14
- Race lap record: 1:26.711 ( (Spain) Andy Soucek, Panoz DP09, 2008, Superleague Formula)

Tanque Circuit (2018–present)
- Length: 4.163 km (2.587 mi)
- Turns: 11
- Race lap record: 1:35.895 ( (Portugal) Francisco Mora, Porsche 911 (991 II) GT3 Cup, 2023, Carrera Cup)

Grand Prix Circuit (1994–1999)
- Length: 4.360 km (2.709 mi)
- Turns: 13
- Race lap record: 1:22.446 ( (United Kingdom) David Coulthard, Williams FW16B, 1994, F1)

Superbike Circuit (1993)
- Length: 4.520 km (2.809 mi)
- Turns: 14
- Race lap record: 1:52.186 ( (United Kingdom) Carl Fogarty, Ducati 888 SBK, 1993, World SBK)

Grand Prix Circuit (1972–1993)
- Length: 4.349 km (2.702 mi)
- Turns: 11
- Race lap record: 1:14.859 ( (United Kingdom) Damon Hill, Williams FW15C, 1993, F1)

Perimeter Circuit (1972–1999)
- Length: 2.942 km (1.828 mi)
- Turns: 8
- Race lap record: 0:58.450 ( (Australia) David Walker, GRD S73, 1973, Group 5)

The Circuito do Estoril or Autódromo do Estoril (Estoril Circuit), officially known as Autódromo Fernanda Pires da Silva, is a motorsport race track on the Portuguese Riviera, outside of Lisbon, owned by state-run holding management company Parpública. Its length is 4.182 km (2.599 mi). It was the home of the Formula One Portuguese Grand Prix from 1984 to 1996.

== History ==
Estoril, a vacation-destination beach town located 32 km (20 mi) west of the Portuguese capital city of Lisbon has had motor racing dating back to the 1930s, with a 2.8 km (1.7 mi) street circuit used in 1937 for a local race. The current Estoril circuit was built and completed in 1972 on a rocky plateau near the village of Alcabideche, 9 km (5.6 mi) from Estoril, the town lending its name to the circuit. The course has two hairpin turns, noticeable elevation changes, and a long 0.986 km (0.613 mi) start/finish straight. Its original perimeter was 4.349 km (2.702 mi), and the maximum gradient is nearly 7%. Monsanto Park, another street circuit in Lisbon hosted a variety of motor racing events in the 1950s, including the 1959 Portuguese Grand Prix, an event it shared briefly with the Boavista street circuit in Porto.

Its first years saw many national races, as well as an occasional Formula 2 race. However, the course soon fell into disrepair due to the owning company having been taken over by the state between 1975 and 1978, and a significant redevelopment effort was needed before international motorsport returned in 1984. In the 1980s, the Rally de Portugal also had a special stage at the circuit.

Estoril became a popular event on the F1 calendar, the setting for many well-known moments including Niki Lauda winning the 1984 championship, his third and final, from McLaren teammate Alain Prost by just half a point by finishing second to Prost at the 1984 Portuguese Grand Prix; three-time world champion Ayrton Senna's first F1 win in 1985; Nigel Mansell's notorious black flag incident and subsequent collision with Senna in 1989; Riccardo Patrese being launched airborne in a near-backward flip after colliding with Gerhard Berger on the main straight in 1992; and Jacques Villeneuve overtaking Michael Schumacher around the outside of the final turn in 1996.

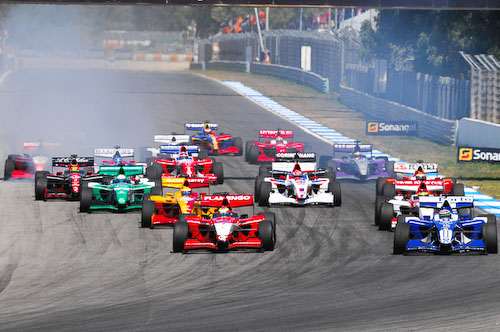
Start of the second race of SuperLeague in Autódromo do Estoril

Throughout the years, Estoril has had numerous problems with safety, failing safety inspections on more than one occasion. After the death of Ayrton Senna at the 1994 San Marino Grand Prix, a chicane was added which increased the circuit length to 4.360 km (2.709 mi). Estoril sometimes has strong winds. Many teams were fond of using Estoril for winter testing.

Estoril was dropped from the F1 calendar for the 1997 season, though it continued to play host to top-level single-seater, sports car and touring car events, including the FIA GT Championship, the DTM and the World Series by Renault. A new redesign of the parabolica turn which saw its length reduced to 4.182 km (2.599 mi) was implemented in 2000 in order to obtain FIM homologation.

On 3 September 2000, the Autódromo do Estoril held its first Portuguese motorcycle Grand Prix, an event held annually. On 23 October 2005, the circuit hosted the third round of the first ever A1 Grand Prix racing season, with both races in the event being won by the French team. The track hosted Superleague Formula series events in 2008 and 2009.

In 2020, due to rescheduling of major international sport series due to COVID-19 pandemic, Estoril hosted the final race of 2020 Superbike World Championship (after hosting the series in 1988 and 1993) and the final race of 2019–20 FIM Endurance World Championship (after hosting the series in 1987 and 2000).

== Layout history ==
Circuito do Estoril layout history
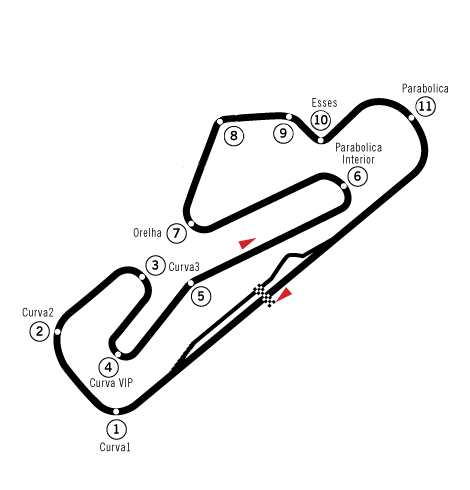
Grand Prix Circuit (1972–1993)

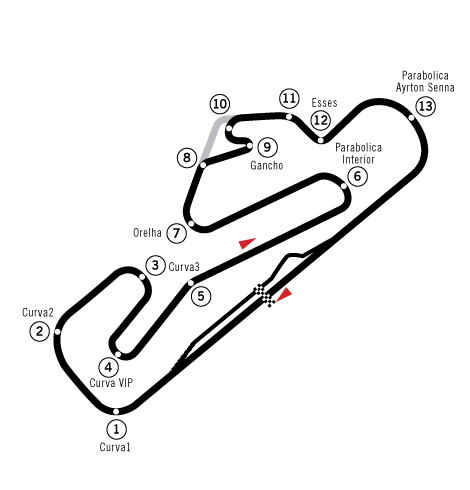
Grand Prix Circuit (1994–1999)

Grand Prix Circuit (2000–present)

== Lap records ==
As of October 2026, the fastest official race lap records at the Circuito do Estoril are listed as:

| Category | Time | Driver | Vehicle | Event |
Grand Prix Circuit (2000–present): 4.182 km (2.599 mi)
| Superleague Formula | 1:26.711 | Andy Soucek | Panoz DP09 | 2008 Estoril Superleague Formula round |
| Formula Renault 3.5 | 1:26.925 | Ben Hanley | Dallara T05 | 2007 Estoril Formula Renault 3.5 Series round |
| Formula Nissan | 1:28.542 | Heikki Kovalainen | Dallara SN01 | 2004 Estoril Formula Nissan round |
| Euroformula Open | 1:29.425 | Filip Ugran | Dallara 320 | 2022 Estoril Euroformula Open round |
| Auto GP | 1:29.638 | Antônio Pizzonia | Lola B05/52 | 2014 Estoril Auto GP round |
| LMP1 | 1:30.702 | Neel Jani | Lola B10/60 | 2011 6 Hours of Estoril |
| A1GP | 1:31.106 | Alexandre Prémat | Lola A1GP | 2005 Estoril A1GP round |
| LMP900 | 1:31.341 | Stefan Johansson | Audi R8 | 2001 1000km of Estoril |
| LMP2 | 1:32.611 | Tom Kimber-Smith | Zytek Z11SN | 2011 6 Hours of Estoril |
| International Formula Master | 1:32.719 | Fabio Leimer | Tatuus N.T07 | 2008 Estoril Formula Master round |
| LMP3 | 1:32.958 | Klaus Bachler | Ligier JS P3 | 2018 4 Hours of Estoril |
| Formula 3 | 1:34.067 | Éric Salignon | Dallara F303 | 2004 Estoril F3 Euro Series round |
| Formula One | 1:34.420 | Yutaka Toriba | Williams FW07C | 2025 Estoril Classics |
| World SBK | 1:34.525 | Nicolò Bulega | Ducati Panigale V4 R | 2026 Estoril World SBK round |
| Formula Regional | 1:35.166 | Mari Boya | Tatuus F3 T-318-EC3 | 2023 Estoril Eurocup-3 round |
| GT3 | 1:35.393 | Axcil Jefferies | Ferrari 488 GT3 Evo | 2022 Estoril International GT Open round |
| DTM | 1:35.528 | Gary Paffett | AMG-Mercedes C-Klasse 2004 | 2004 Estoril DTM round |
| MotoGP | 1:36.909 | Jorge Lorenzo | Yamaha YZR-M1 | 2012 Portuguese motorcycle Grand Prix |
| LMPC | 1:37.447 | Nicolas Marroc | Oreca FLM09 | 2011 6 Hours of Estoril |
| LMP675 | 1:37.630 | Mirko Savoldi | Lucchini SR2001 | 2002 FIA Sportscar Championship Estoril |
| GT1 (GTS) | 1:37.708 | Fabrizio Gollin | Ferrari 550-GTS Maranello | 2003 FIA GT Estoril 500km |
| Formula Renault 2.0 | 1:37.730 | Daniel Ricciardo | Tatuus FR2000 | 2008 Estoril Formula Renault 2.0 West European Cup round |
| FIM Moto2 | 1:38.366 | Unai Orradre | Kalex Moto2 | 2024 2nd Estoril FIM Moto2 round |
| Lamborghini Super Trofeo | 1:38.546 | Seweryn Mazur | Lamborghini Huracán Super Trofeo Evo2 | 2025 Estoril GT Winter Series round |
| Formula Chrysler | 1:38.680 | Ricardo van der Ende | Reynard 2KF | 2001 Estoril Formula Chrysler Euroseries round |
| Formula 4 | 1:38.968 | Pedro Clerot | Tatuus F4-T421 | 2023 Estoril F4 Spain round |
| Porsche Carrera Cup | 1:38.986 | Ariel Levi | Porsche 911 (992 I) GT3 Cup | 2024 Estoril Porsche Sprint Challenge Southern Europe round |
| World SSP | 1:39.093 | Valentin Debise | ZXMOTO 820RR | 2026 Estoril World SSP round |
| FIM EWC | 1:39.155 | Sylvain Guintoli | Suzuki GSX-R1000 | 2021 12 Hours of Estoril |
| Ferrari Challenge | 1:39.149 | Thomas Fleming | Ferrari 488 Challenge Evo | 2023 Estoril Ferrari Challenge Europe round |
| Renault Sport Trophy | 1:39.258 | Steijn Schothorst | Renault Sport R.S. 01 | 2016 Estoril Renault Sport Trophy round |
| LM GTE | 1:39.370 | Michele Rugolo | Ferrari 458 Italia GT2 | 2014 4 Hours of Estoril |
| GT4 | 1:40.470 | César Machado | Toyota GR Supra GT4 | 2024 2nd Estoril Campeonato de Portugal de Velocidade round |
| 250cc | 1:40.521 | Álvaro Bautista | Aprilia RSA 250 | 2007 Portuguese motorcycle Grand Prix |
| 500cc | 1:40.683 | Loris Capirossi | Honda NSR500 | 2001 Portuguese motorcycle Grand Prix |
| Moto2 | 1:40.921 | Pol Espargaró | Kalex Moto2 | 2012 Portuguese motorcycle Grand Prix |
| N-GT | 1:42.413 | Andrea Bertolini | Ferrari 360 Modena GT | 2003 FIA GT Estoril 500km |
| TCR Touring Car | 1:42.562 | Daniel Teixeira | Hyundai Elantra N TCR | 2024 2nd Estoril Campeonato de Portugal de Velocidade round |
| FIM Moto3 | 1:43.167 | Brian Uriarte | KTM RC250GP | 2025 Estoril FIM JuniorGP round |
| Eurocup Mégane Trophy | 1:44.396 | Dimitri Enjalbert | Renault Mégane Renault Sport | 2008 Estoril Eurocup Mégane Trophy round |
| GT | 1:44.816 | Terry Rymer | Porsche 911 (996) GT3-R | 2001 1000km of Estoril |
| Super Touring | 1:44.850 | Yvan Muller | Alfa Romeo 156 D2 | 2001 Estoril ESTC round |
| Sportbike | 1:44.962 | Roberto Fernandez | Kawasaki Ninja ZX-6R 636 | 2026 Estoril Spanish Sportbike round |
| 125cc | 1:45.027 | Gabor Talmacsi | Aprilia RSA 125 | 2007 Portuguese motorcycle Grand Prix |
| Moto3 | 1:47.354 | Sandro Cortese | KTM RC250GP | 2012 Portuguese motorcycle Grand Prix |
| Super 2000 | 1:48.280 | Nicola Larini | Alfa Romeo 156 GTA | 2003 Estoril ETCC round |
| SEAT León Supercopa | 1:48.524 | Mikel Azcona | SEAT León Cup Racer | 2016 Estoril SEAT León Eurocup round |
| Supersport 300 | 1:49.791 | José Manuel Osuna Saez | Kawasaki Ninja 400 | 2025 Estoril Supersport 300 round |
| World WCR | 1:49.872 | Ana Carrasco | Yamaha YZF-R7 | 2024 Estoril World WCR round |
Tanque Circuit (2018–present): 4.163 km (2.587 mi)
| Porsche Carrera Cup | 1:35.895 | Francisco Mora | Porsche 911 (991 II) GT3 Cup | 2023 Estoril Porsche Sprint Challenge Iberica round |
| GT4 | 1:40.307 | Elias Niskanen | Mercedes-AMG GT4 | 2023 Estoril SuperCars Endurance Series round |
| TCR Touring Car | 1:43.732 | António Coimbra | Hyundai Elantra N TCR | 2023 Estoril SuperCars Endurance Series round |
Grand Prix Circuit (1994–1999): 4.360 km (2.709 mi)
| Formula One | 1:22.446 | David Coulthard | Williams FW16B | 1994 Portuguese Grand Prix |
| F3000 | 1:31.193 | Emmanuel Clérico | Reynard 94D | 1994 Estoril F3000 round |
| Formula Renault 2.0 | 1:41.751 | Gianmaria Bruni | Tatuus RC99 | 1999 Estoril Eurocup Formula Renault round |
| Class 1 Touring Cars | 1:42.650 | Nicola Larini | Alfa Romeo 155 V6 TI | 1995 Estoril DTM round |
Superbike Circuit (1993): 4.520 km (2.809 mi)
| World SBK | 1:52.186 | Carl Fogarty | Ducati 888 SBK | 1993 Estoril World SBK round |
Grand Prix Circuit (1972–1993): 4.349 km (2.702 mi)
| Formula One | 1:14.859 | Damon Hill | Williams FW15C | 1993 Portuguese Grand Prix |
| F3000 | 1:30.305 | Mike Thackwell | Ralt RB20 | 1985 Estoril F3000 round |
| Formula Two | 1:34.160 | Derek Daly | Chevron B40 | 1977 Estoril European F2 round |
| Group 6 | 1:37.730 | Vittorio Brambilla | Alfa Romeo 33SC12 | 1977 Prémio International da Costa do Sol |
| Group A | 1:40.120 | Gianfranco Brancatelli | Volvo 240 Turbo | 1985 Estoril ETCC round |
| World SBK | 1:48.330 | Raymond Roche | Ducati 851 | 1988 Estoril World SBK round |
| Group 5 | 1:49.970 | Carlos Santos | GRD S73 | 1975 Grande Prémio do Estoril |
| Group 2 | 1:51.300 | Dieter Quester | BMW 3.0 CSL | 1977 Estoril ETCC round |
Perimeter Circuit (1972–1999): 2.942 km (1.828 mi)
| Group 5 | 0:58.450 | David Walker | GRD S73 | 1973 Grande Prémio do A.C.P. |
| Formula 3 | 1:02.040 | Michel Leclère | Alpine A364 | 1972 Estoril French F3 round |
| Group 4 | 1:05.640 | Clemens Schickentanz | Porsche Carrera RSR | 1973 Estoril European GT Championship round |

== Events ==
Current

- January: GT Winter Series, GT4 Winter Series, Formula Winter Series, Porsche Sprint Challenge Southern Europe
- June: FIM Moto3 Junior World Championship, FIM Moto2 European Championship, Campeonato de España de Superbike, Moto4 European Cup
- September: Classic Endurance Racing Estoril Classics
- October: Superbike World Championship, Supersport World Championship, Yamaha R3 bLU cRU FIM World Cup
- December: Supercars Endurance Series Estoril Endurance Festival, Campeonato Portugal de Velocidade

Future

- Sportbike World Championship (2027)

Former

- 24H Series
  - 12 Hours of Estoril (2023)
- A1 Grand Prix (2005)
- Auto GP (2004, 2014)
- Deutsche Tourenwagen Masters (2004)
- EFDA Nations Cup (1992–1993)
- Eurocup Formula Renault 2.0 (1999, 2001, 2005, 2007–2008, 2016)
- Eurocup Mégane Trophy (2005, 2007–2008)
- Eurocup-3 (2023)
- Euroformula Open Championship (2001–2007, 2015–2018, 2022)
- European Formula Two Championship (1975–1977)
- European Le Mans Series
  - 4 Hours of Estoril (2011, 2014–2016)
- European Touring Car Championship (1977–1978, 1985–1988, 2001–2003)
- European Touring Car Cup (2006)
- European Truck Racing Cup (2003)
- F4 Spanish Championship (2017, 2023)
- Ferrari Challenge Europe (2023)
- FIA GT Championship (2000–2003)
- FIA Sportscar Championship
  - FIA Sportscar Championship Estoril (2002–2003)
- FIM Endurance World Championship
  - 12 Hours of Estoril (1987, 2000, 2020–2021)
- FIM Women's Circuit Racing World Championship (2024)
- Formula Chrysler Euroseries (2001)
- Formula 3 Euro Series (2004)
- Formula One
  - Portuguese Grand Prix (1984–1996)
- Formula Renault 2.0 West European Cup (1987, 1999, 2001, 2008)
- Formula Renault 3.5 Series (2005, 2007–2008)
- French Formula Three Championship (1972)
- Grand Prix motorcycle racing
  - Portuguese motorcycle Grand Prix (2000–2012)
- GT3 Le Mans Cup (2016)
- IMSA European Le Mans Series
  - Estoril 1000km (2001)
- International Formula 3000 (1985, 1994–1996)
- International GT Open (2006, 2008, 2015–2018, 2022)
- International Touring Car Championship (1995–1996)
- Italian Formula Renault Championship (2001)
- Porsche Cup Brasil (2011–2012, 2014, 2019, 2024–2025)
- Porsche Supercup (1994, 1996)
- Prototype Winter Series (2024–2025)
- Red Bull MotoGP Rookies Cup (2007–2008, 2011–2012)
- Renault Sport Trophy (2016)
- SEAT León Eurocup (2008, 2015–2016)
- Sidecar World Championship (2019, 2021–2025)
- Stock Car Brasil (1982)
- Superleague Formula
  - Superleague Formula round Portugal (2008–2009)
- Supersport 300 World Championship (2020, 2022, 2025)
- TCR International Series (2016)
- TCR Spain Touring Car Championship (2017, 2023–2024)
- Ultimate Cup Series (2019, 2021, 2023)
- V de V Series (2007–2018)
- World Series by Nissan (2001, 2004)
- World Touring Car Championship
  - FIA WTCC Race of Portugal (2008)
- World Touring Car Cup
  - FIA WTCR Race of Portugal (2021)

== Major event winners ==
=== Motorcycling - Portuguese Grand Prix ===
| Year | Track | Moto3 | | Moto2 | | MotoGP | | Report |
| Year | Track | Rider | Manufacturer | Rider | Manufacturer | Rider | Manufacturer | Report |
|---|---|---|---|---|---|---|---|---|
| 2012 | Estoril | (Germany) Sandro Cortese | KTM | (Spain) Marc Márquez | Suter | (Australia) Casey Stoner | Honda | Report |
| Year | Track | 125 cc | | Moto2 | | MotoGP | | Report |
| Year | Track | Rider | Manufacturer | Rider | Manufacturer | Rider | Manufacturer | Report |
| 2011 | Estoril | (Spain) Nicolás Terol | Aprilia | (Germany) Stefan Bradl | Kalex | (Spain) Dani Pedrosa | Honda | Report |
| 2010 | Estoril | (Spain) Marc Márquez | Derbi | (Germany) Stefan Bradl | Suter | (Spain) Jorge Lorenzo | Yamaha | Report |
| Year | Track | 125 cc | | 250 cc | | MotoGP | | Report |
| Year | Track | Rider | Manufacturer | Rider | Manufacturer | Rider | Manufacturer | Report |
| 2009 | Estoril | (Spain) Pol Espargaró | Derbi | (Italy) Marco Simoncelli | Gilera | (Spain) Jorge Lorenzo | Yamaha | Report |
| 2008 | Estoril | (Italy) Simone Corsi | Aprilia | (Spain) Álvaro Bautista | Aprilia | (Spain) Jorge Lorenzo | Yamaha | Report |
| 2007 | Estoril | (Spain) Héctor Faubel | Aprilia | (Spain) Álvaro Bautista | Aprilia | (Italy) Valentino Rossi | Yamaha | Report |
| 2006 | Estoril | (Spain) Álvaro Bautista | Aprilia | (Italy) Andrea Dovizioso | Honda | (Spain) Toni Elías | Honda | Report |
| 2005 | Estoril | (Finland) Mika Kallio | KTM | (Australia) Casey Stoner | Aprilia | (Brazil) Alex Barros | Honda | Report |
| 2004 | Estoril | (Spain) Héctor Barberá | Aprilia | (Spain) Toni Elías | Honda | (Italy) Valentino Rossi | Yamaha | Report |
| 2003 | Estoril | (Spain) Pablo Nieto | Aprilia | (Spain) Toni Elías | Aprilia | (Italy) Valentino Rossi | Honda | Report |
| 2002 | Estoril | (France) Arnaud Vincent | Aprilia | (Spain) Fonsi Nieto | Aprilia | (Italy) Valentino Rossi | Honda | Report |
| Year | Track | 125 cc | | 250 cc | | 500 cc | | Report |
| Year | Track | Rider | Manufacturer | Rider | Manufacturer | Rider | Manufacturer | Report |
| 2001 | Estoril | (San Marino) Manuel Poggiali | Gilera | (Japan) Daijiro Kato | Honda | (Italy) Valentino Rossi | Honda | Report |
| 2000 | Estoril | (Spain) Emilio Alzamora | Honda | (Japan) Daijiro Kato | Honda | (Australia) Garry McCoy | Yamaha | Report |
